= 24th Submarine Division =

- Active: October 1985 – present
- Allegiance: Soviet Union (1985–1991); Russian Federation (1991–present)
- Branch: Russian navy
- Role: Naval warfare
- Part of: Northern Fleet
- Garrison/HQ: Gadzhiyevo
- Mottos: Честь, традиции, долг (Honor, Tradition, Duty)

The 24th Submarine Division (Russian: 24-я дивизия АПЛ СФ) is a unit of the Northern Fleet of the Russian Navy. The Russian name consists of Дивизия (diviziya - division) АПЛ (APL as an abbreviation of Атомная подводная лодка - Atomic Submarine) СФ (SF as an abbreviation of Severni flot - Northern Fleet) and the division number 24 together.

== History ==
With the Soviet Union launching submarines equipped with cruise missiles, the Soviet Navy, formed new formations to operate them.

The formation of the 24th Division was ordered by the Chief of Staff of the Navy from 11 May 1985 and implemented in the same year largely. Established 30 October 1985. Submarines were taken from existing formations and assigned to the newly formed division. First commander of the newly created division was Captain First Rank Vladimir Mikhaylovich Monastyrshin.

== Commanders ==
- Jul 1985-Oct 1987 VADM Vladimir Mikhaylovich Monastyrshin
- Oct 1987-Dec 1989 VADM Nikolay Ivanovich Mazin
- Dec 1989-Jun 1992 RADM Boris Sergeyevich Bogdanov
- Sep 1992-Jun 1996 RADM Sergey Anatolyevich Bliznyuk
- Jun 1996-Sep 1998 RADM Aleksandr Nikolayevich Bukin
- Sep 1998-Aug 2000 RADM Aleksey Vitalyevich Burilichev
- Aug 2000-Mar 2003 RADM Vladimir Ivanovich Korolyov
- xxx 2003 RADM Igor Vladimirovich Fyodorov
- 2005—2008 RADM Anatoly Nikolayevich Minakov
- 2009—2010 Captain 1st Rank Viktor Nikolayevich Kochemazov
- 2010—2016 RADM Konstantin Petrovich Kabantsov

== Boats ==
- Akula-class submarine I-class SSN Pantera (K-317)
- Akula I-class SSN Volk (K-461)
- Akula I-class SSN Leopard (K-328)
- Akula I-class SSN Tigr (K-154)
- Akula II-class SSN Vepr (K-157)
- Akula II-class SSN Gepard (K-335)
