= Russian submarine Volk =

Akula-class submarine of the Russian Navy

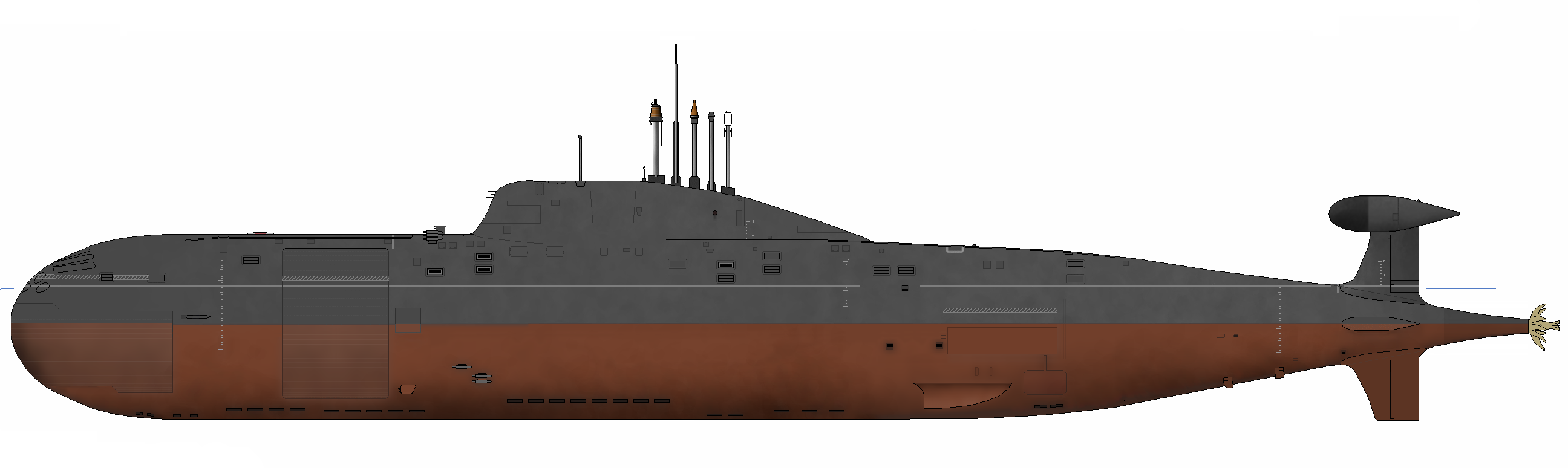
- Akula-class submarine

History

Russia
- Name: K-461
- Builder: Sevmash, Severodvinsk
- Yard number: 831
- Laid down: 14 November 1987
- Launched: 11 June 1991
- Commissioned: 29 December 1991
- Renamed: Volk; (Волк)
- Namesake: Volk
- Home port: Gadzhiyevo
- Identification: Pennant number: 867
- Status: Active

General characteristics
- Class & type: Akula-class submarine
- Displacement: 8,010–14,470 long tons (8,140–14,700 t) surfaced; 12,570 long tons (12,770 t) submerged
- Length: 110.3 m (361 ft 11 in) maximum
- Beam: 13.6 m (44 ft 7 in)
- Draught: 9.7 m (31 ft 10 in)
- Propulsion: one 190 MW OK-650B/OK-650M pressurized water nuclear reactor (HEU <= 45%); 1 OK-7 steam turbine 43,000 hp (32 MW); 2 OK-2 Turbogenerators producing 2 MW; 1 seven-bladed propeller; 2 OK-300 retractable electric propulsors for low-speed and quiet maneuvering at 5 knots (9.3 km/h; 5.8 mph)
- Speed: 10 knots (19 km/h; 12 mph) surfaced; 28–35 knots (52–65 km/h; 32–40 mph) submerged
- Endurance: 100 days
- Test depth: 480 m (1,570 ft)
- Complement: 73
- Sensors & processing systems: MGK-500 or 540 active/passive suite; Flank arrays; Pelamida towed array sonar; MG-70 mine detection sonar
- Electronic warfare & decoys: Bukhta ESM/ECM; MG-74 Korund noise simulation decoys (fired from external tubes); MT-70 Sonar intercept receiver; Nikhrom-M IFF
- Armament: 4 × 533 mm torpedo tubes (28 torpedoes) and 4 × 650 mm torpedo tubes (12 torpedoes).; 1–3 × Igla-M surface-to-air missile launcher fired from sail (surface use only); Granat cruise missiles, now Kalibr
- Notes: Chiblis Surface Search radar; Medvyeditsa-945 Navigation system; Molniya-M Satellite communications; MGK-80 Underwater communications; Tsunami, Kiparis, Anis, Sintez and Kora Communications antennas; Paravan Towed VLF Antenna; Vspletsk Combat direction system

The K-461 Volk (Russian: Волк, lit. 'wolf') is an Akula-class submarine of the Russian Navy.

== Design ==
Project 971 has a double-hull design. The robust body is made of high-quality alloy steel with σт = 1 GPa (10,000 kgf / cm^{2}). To simplify the installation of equipment, the boat was designed using zonal blocks, which made it possible to transfer a significant amount of work from the cramped conditions of the sub's compartments directly to the workshop. After completion of the installation, the zonal unit is "rolled" into the hull of the boat and connected to the main cables and pipelines of the ship's systems. A two-stage damping system is used: all mechanisms are placed on damped foundations, in addition, each zone unit is isolated from the body by rubber-cord pneumatic shock absorbers. In addition to reducing the overall noise level of nuclear submarines, such a scheme can reduce the impact of underwater explosions on equipment and crew. The boat has a developed vertical tail unit with a streamlined boule, in which the towed antenna is located. Also on the submarine are two reclining thrusters and retractable bow horizontal rudders with flaps. A feature of the project is the smoothly mated connection of the tail unit to the hull. This is done to reduce noise-generating hydrodynamic eddies.

Power supply is carried out by a nuclear power plant. The lead boat, K-284 Akula, is equipped with an OK-650M.01 pressurized water-cooled nuclear reactor. On later orders, the AEU has minor improvements. Some sources report that subsequent boats are equipped with OK-9VM reactors. The thermal power of the reactor is 190 MW, the shaft power is 50,000 liters. with. Two auxiliary electric motors in the hinged outboard columns have a capacity of 410 hp. with., there is one diesel generator ASDG-1000.

== Construction and career ==
The submarine was laid down on 22 February 1989 at Sevmash, Severodvinsk. Launched on 14 April 1989 and commissioned on 29 December 1989.

On 27 January 1992, the Naval Flag was solemnly raised, the date of 27 January was approved as the annual holiday of the crew.

On 29 January 1992, consecrated according to the Orthodox rite as a cleric of the St. Elias Cathedral in the mountains. Arkhangelsk by Archpriest Vladimir.

From 31 January 1992 to 2 February 1992, completed the transition to a permanent base in b. Yagelnaya GB. Pollock.

On 11 February 1992, included in the 24th Submarine Division of the 3rd Flpl SF.

On 3 June 1992, he was reclassified as a nuclear-powered submarine.

On 16 August 1993, during the commissioning of the power plant, due to erroneous actions of the personnel, the safety automatic devices of the steam generators were triggered.

From November 1993 to January 1994, she completed the tasks of the 1st combat service.

From 5 December 1995 to 20 February 1996 completed the tasks of the 2nd combat service with the crew of K-317 Pantera under the command of Captain 1st Rank S.V. Spravtsev in the Mediterranean Sea, during which she provided long-range anti-submarine escort of an aircraft carrier multipurpose group led by the aircraft carrier Admiral of the Fleet of the Soviet Union Kuznetsov. At the same time, long-term tracking of several NATO submarines, including the American Los Angeles-class nuclear submarine, was carried out.

On 10 September 1998, on board the K-157 Vepr under the control of the crew of the K-461 Volk an emergency occurred. When the boat was in Gadzhievo, 19-year-old sailor Alexander Kuzminykh, in a state of mental breakdown, armed with an AKS74U machine gun, shot 8 colleagues and locked himself in the torpedo compartment, threatening to detonate the ammunition. At the same time, he supplied gas from the LOH system to the adjacent compartment. Ultimately, during the negotiations, due to the impossibility of voluntary surrender, the sailor was eliminated by FSB specialists.

Between May 2005 and December 2006, she underwent a medium repair at Sevmash shipyard.

Since 14 August 2014, the submarine is undergoing medium repair and deep modernization at the Zvezdochka Ship Repair Center. Her overhaul and modernization are expected to be finished in 2028.

== In fiction ==
- Volk features prominently in both 2018 Aquaman and Hunter Killer films.
- Volk is featured along with USS Alabama (SSBN-731) in the 1995 Crimsom Tide film.
