= Russian submarine Kuzbass =

Akula-class submarine of the Russian Navy

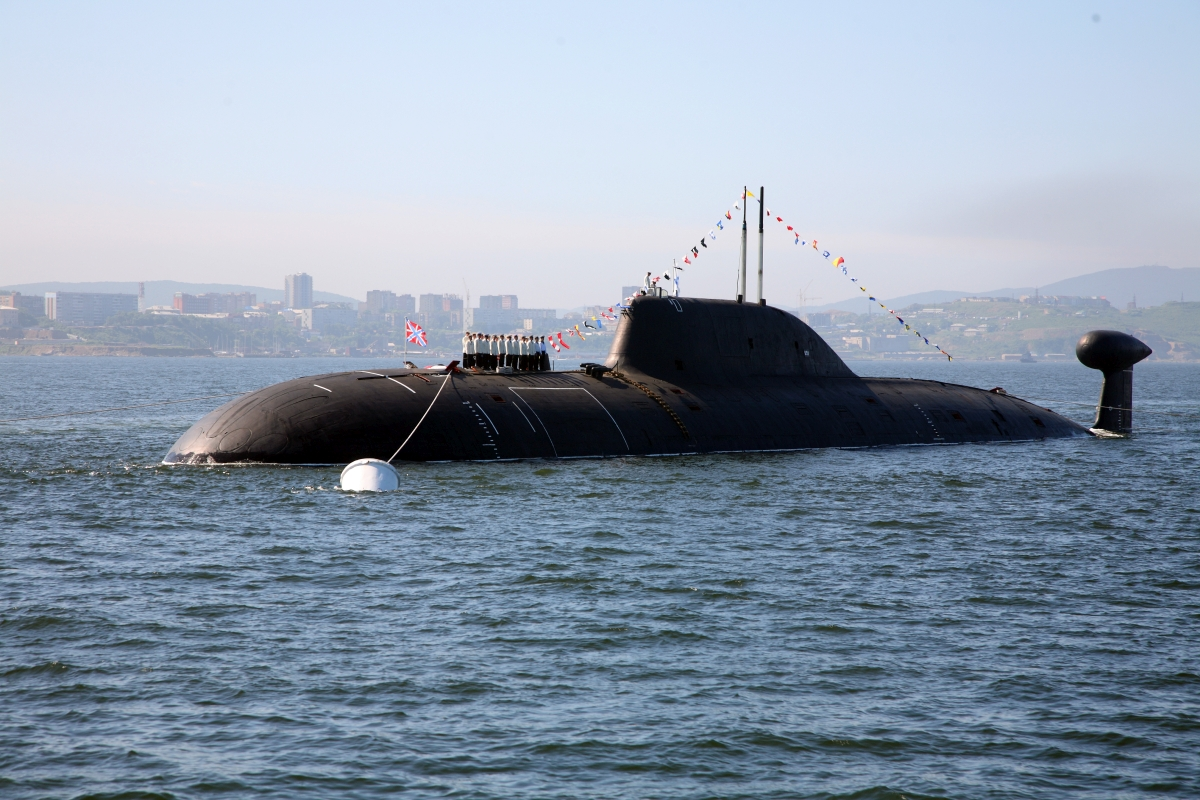
- Kuzbass

History

Russia
- Name: K-419
- Builder: Amur Shipyard, Komsomolsk-on-Amur
- Yard number: 516
- Laid down: 28 July 1991
- Launched: 18 May 1992
- Commissioned: 31 December 1992
- Renamed: Kuzbass; (Кузбасс)
- Namesake: Kuzbass
- Home port: Vilyuchinsk
- Identification: Pennant number: 951
- Status: Active

General characteristics
- Class & type: Akula-class submarine
- Displacement: 8,010–14,470 long tons (8,140–14,700 t) surfaced; 12,570 long tons (12,770 t) submerged
- Length: 110.3 m (361 ft 11 in) maximum
- Beam: 13.6 m (44 ft 7 in)
- Draught: 9.7 m (31 ft 10 in)
- Propulsion: one 190 MW OK-650B/OK-650M pressurized water nuclear reactor (HEU <= 45%); 1 OK-7 steam turbine 43,000 hp (32 MW); 2 OK-2 Turbogenerators producing 2 MW; 1 seven-bladed propeller; 2 OK-300 retractable electric propulsors for low-speed and quiet maneuvering at 5 knots (9.3 km/h; 5.8 mph)
- Speed: 10 knots (19 km/h; 12 mph) surfaced; 28–35 knots (52–65 km/h; 32–40 mph) submerged
- Endurance: 100 days
- Test depth: 480 m (1,570 ft)
- Complement: 73
- Sensors & processing systems: MGK-500 or 540 active/passive suite; Flank arrays; Pelamida towed array sonar; MG-70 mine detection sonar
- Electronic warfare & decoys: Bukhta ESM/ECM; MG-74 Korund noise simulation decoys (fired from external tubes); MT-70 Sonar intercept receiver; Nikhrom-M IFF
- Armament: 4 × 533 mm torpedo tubes (28 torpedoes) and 4 × 650 mm torpedo tubes (12 torpedoes).; 1–3 × Igla-M surface-to-air missile launcher fired from sail (surface use only); Granat cruise missiles, now Kalibr
- Notes: Chiblis Surface Search radar; Medvyeditsa-945 Navigation system; Molniya-M Satellite communications; MGK-80 Underwater communications; Tsunami, Kiparis, Anis, Sintez and Kora Communications antennas; Paravan Towed VLF Antenna; Vspletsk Combat direction system

K-419 Kuzbass is an Akula-class submarine in the Russian Navy.

== Design ==
Project 971 has a double-hull design. The robust body is made of high-quality alloy steel with σт = 1 GPa (10,000 kgf / cm^{2}). To simplify the installation of equipment, the boat was designed using zonal blocks, which made it possible to transfer a significant amount of work from the cramped conditions of the sub's compartments directly to the workshop. After completion of the installation, the zonal unit is “rolled” into the hull of the boat and connected to the main cables and pipelines of the ship's systems. A two-stage damping system is used: all mechanisms are placed on damped foundations, in addition, each zone unit is isolated from the body by rubber-cord pneumatic shock absorbers. In addition to reducing the overall noise level of nuclear submarines, such a scheme can reduce the impact of underwater explosions on equipment and crew. The boat has a developed vertical tail unit with a streamlined boule, in which the towed antenna is located. Also on the submarine are two reclining thrusters and retractable bow horizontal rudders with flaps. A feature of the project is the smoothly mated connection of the tail unit to the hull. This is done to reduce noise-generating hydrodynamic eddies.

Power supply is carried out by a nuclear power plant. The lead boat, K-284 Akula, is equipped with an OK-650M.01 pressurized water-cooled nuclear reactor. On later orders, the AEU has minor improvements. Some sources report that subsequent boats are equipped with OK-9VM reactors. The thermal power of the reactor is 190 MW, the shaft power is 50,000 liters. with. Two auxiliary electric motors in the hinged outboard columns have a capacity of 410 hp. with., there is one diesel generator ASDG-1000.

== Construction and career ==
The submarine was laid down on 28 July 1991 at Amur Shipyard, Komsomolsk-on-Amur. Launched on 18 May 1992 and commissioned on 31 December 1992.

On 10 July 1993, a boat under the command of Captain 1st Rank A.A. Appolonov with a marching headquarters on board, arrived at a permanent base in Krasheninnikov Bay in Kamchatka. On August 11, the first practical shooting was performed with the PLAC with excellent marks. On 13 April 1993 the boat was named Morzh.

From October to December 1995, the tasks of the first combat service off the western shores of the United States were completed in a tough anti-submarine warfare system by the US PLC.

From May to July 1996, the tasks of the second combat service were completed.

From July to August 1997, the tasks of the third combat service were completed.

On 27 February 1998, by order of the Navy General Committee of 29 January 1998, he was rename Kuzbass, after which the combat patrol missions were successfully completed.

On 1 May 1998, after the 45th DPL was disbanded, Kuzbass was transferred to the 10th DPL of the 2nd FLPL. On 1 September 1998, he was transferred to the 16th OpEskPL KTOF.

In 2001, the boat was repaired at the Federal State Unitary Enterprise "SVRTs" in the Seldevaya Bay.

On 1 June 2003, Kuzbass was transferred to the 16th ESCPL KTOF, then until 2005 it was used to practice combat training tasks by the 78th crew, the 622nd crew and the crew of the Guards K-295 Samara.

In 2007, Kuzbass took part in providing sea trials for the K-152 Nerpa.

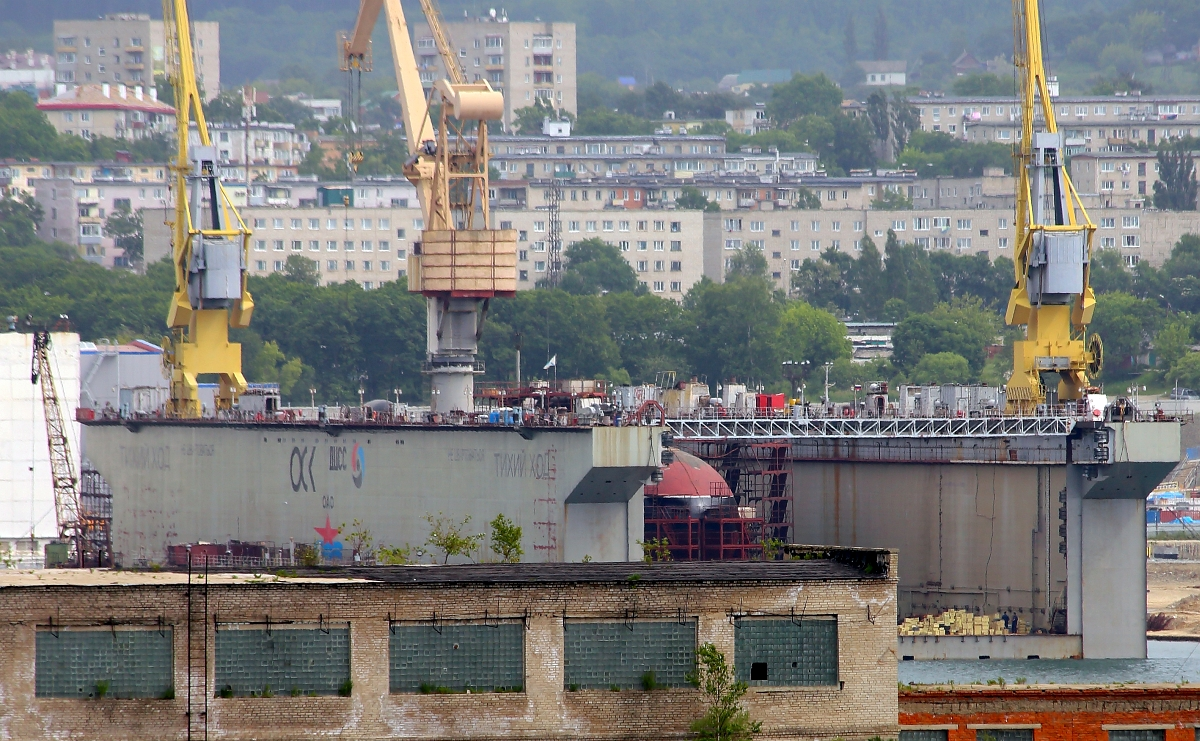
Kuzbass being dry docked on 27 June 2015

In July 2008, the boat took part in the KTOF Naval Parade in the Amur Bay dedicated to the Day of the Navy. From September to December, emergency repairs took place in the city of Bolshoy Kamen.

Since 2009, the nuclear submarine has been undergoing repairs at the Zvezda shipyard in Bolshoy Kamen, which was scheduled to be completed by the end of 2013. In January 2010, preparations began for loading nuclear fuel. Repairs and modernization lasted until December 2015. On 18 December, the Russian Prime Minister Dmitry Medvedev and the Governor of the Primorsky Territory Vladimir Miklushevsky were shown a modernized boat. On 22 December 2015, the boat was ready for a checkout to the sea with the subsequent transfer to the main basing point until the end of March 2016. On 19 March 2016, the submarine was handed over to the Navy after a lengthy repair.

At the beginning of September 2017, the boat successfully carried out a complex of torpedo firing from a submerged position at the ships of the imaginary enemy, the role of which was played by small anti-submarine ships of the Kamchatka group of the Pacific Fleet.

As of September 2017, he is part of the 10th Submarine Division of the 16th submarine squadron of the Pacific Fleet based at Vilyuchinsk (Krasheninnikov Bay). In 2017, following the results of the championship for the challenge prize of the Commander-in-Chief of the Navy, the boat's crew won the Commander-in-Chief of the Navy prize in the individual championship of the crews of all fleets, and also received first place for performing a torpedo attack.

On 15 July 2022, Kuzbass (along with Omsk and Tomsk) returned from three month deployment.
