= Russian submarine Ak Bars =

Akula-class submarine of the Russian Navy

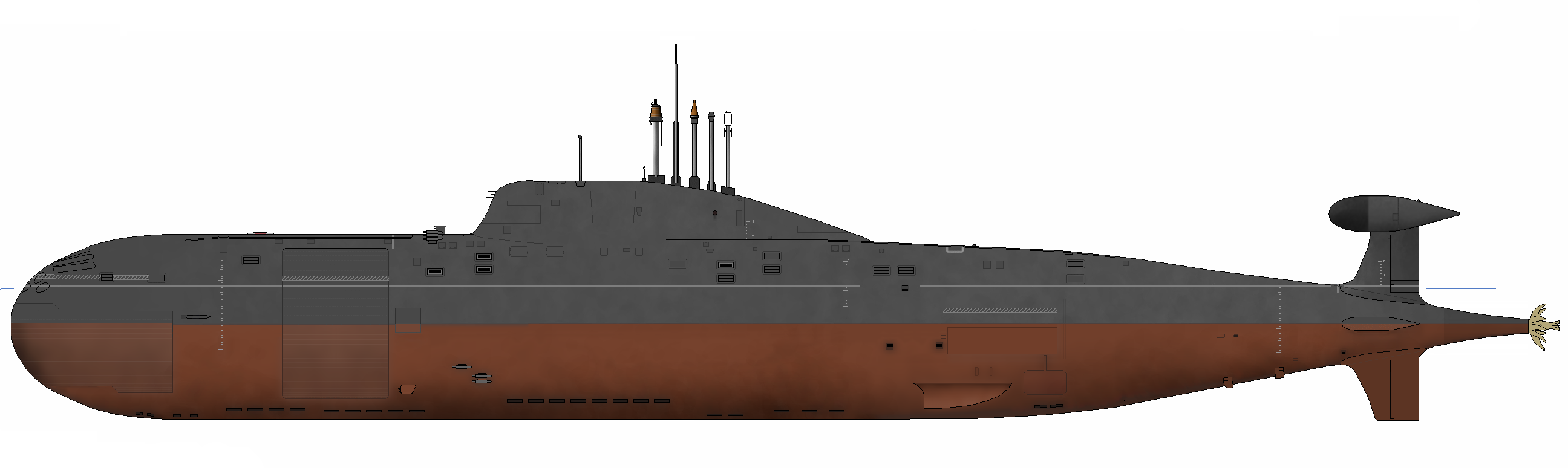
- Akula-class submarine

History

Russia
- Name: K-480
- Builder: Sevmash, Severodvinsk
- Yard number: 821
- Laid down: 22 February 1985
- Launched: 16 April 1988
- Commissioned: 29 December 1988
- Renamed: Ak Bars; (Ак Барс)
- Namesake: Ak Bars
- Decommissioned: 1 October 2002
- Identification: See Pennant numbers
- Fate: Scrapped, 2010

General characteristics
- Class & type: Akula-class submarine
- Displacement: 8,010–14,470 long tons (8,140–14,700 t) surfaced; 12,570 long tons (12,770 t) submerged
- Length: 110.3 m (361 ft 11 in) maximum
- Beam: 13.6 m (44 ft 7 in)
- Draught: 9.7 m (31 ft 10 in)
- Propulsion: one 190 MW OK-650B/OK-650M pressurized water nuclear reactor (HEU <= 45%); 1 OK-7 steam turbine 43,000 hp (32 MW); 2 OK-2 Turbogenerators producing 2 MW; 1 seven-bladed propeller; 2 OK-300 retractable electric propulsors for low-speed and quiet maneuvering at 5 knots (9.3 km/h; 5.8 mph)
- Speed: 10 knots (19 km/h; 12 mph) surfaced; 28–35 knots (52–65 km/h; 32–40 mph) submerged
- Endurance: 100 days
- Test depth: 480 m (1,570 ft)
- Complement: 73
- Sensors & processing systems: MGK-500 or 540 active/passive suite; Flank arrays; Pelamida towed array sonar; MG-70 mine detection sonar
- Electronic warfare & decoys: Bukhta ESM/ECM; MG-74 Korund noise simulation decoys (fired from external tubes); MT-70 Sonar intercept receiver; Nikhrom-M IFF
- Armament: 4 × 533 mm torpedo tubes (28 torpedoes) and 4 × 650 mm torpedo tubes (12 torpedoes).; 1–3 × Igla-M surface-to-air missile launcher fired from sail (surface use only); Granat cruise missiles, now Kalibr
- Notes: Chiblis Surface Search radar; Medvyeditsa-945 Navigation system; Molniya-M Satellite communications; MGK-80 Underwater communications; Tsunami, Kiparis, Anis, Sintez and Kora Communications antennas; Paravan Towed VLF Antenna; Vspletsk Combat direction system

K-480 Ak Bars (Russian: Ак барс, lit. 'white leopard') is an Akula-class submarine in the Russian Navy.

== Design ==
Project 971 has a double-hull design. The robust body is made of high-quality alloy steel with σт = 1 GPa (10,000 kgf / cm²). To simplify the installation of equipment, the boat was designed using zonal blocks, which made it possible to transfer a significant amount of work from the cramped conditions of the sub's compartments directly to the workshop. After completion of the installation, the zonal unit is “rolled” into the hull of the boat and connected to the main cables and pipelines of the ship's systems. A two-stage damping system is used: all mechanisms are placed on damped foundations, in addition, each zone unit is isolated from the body by rubber-cord pneumatic shock absorbers. In addition to reducing the overall noise level of nuclear submarines, such a scheme can reduce the impact of underwater explosions on equipment and crew. The boat has a developed vertical tail unit with a streamlined boule, in which the towed antenna is located. Also on the submarine are two reclining thrusters and retractable bow horizontal rudders with flaps. A feature of the project is the smoothly mated connection of the tail unit to the hull. This is done to reduce noise-generating hydrodynamic eddies.

Power supply is carried out by a nuclear power plant. The lead boat, K-284 Akula, is equipped with an OK-650M.01 pressurized water-cooled nuclear reactor. On later orders, the AEU has minor improvements. Some sources report that subsequent boats are equipped with OK-9VM reactors. The thermal power of the reactor is 190 MW, the shaft power is 50,000 hp. Two auxiliary electric motors in the hinged outboard columns have a capacity of 410 hp, there is one diesel generator ASDG-1000.

== Construction and career ==
The submarine was laid down on 22 February 1985, at Sevmash, Severodvinsk, launched on 16 April 1988, and commissioned on 29 December 1988.

On 29 December 1989, it was assigned to the 24th Submarine Division of the 3rd Submarine Flottila of the Northern Fleet.

On 24 July 1991, it received the name Bars.

In 1996, a patronage agreement was signed with the government of the Republic of Tatarstan.

In 1998, the name of the vessel was officially changed to Ak Bars, in honor of one of the symbols of the republic.

The boat was withdrawn from the Navy on 1 October 2002, after which it was transferred to ARVI for long-term storage in Sayda Bay.

In 2007, it was towed to the Zvyozdochka shipyard to be recycled into scrap metal.

On 1 December 2008, the naval flag was lowered and the submarine was handed over to JSC TsS for disposal.

In April 2009, preparatory work began for the unloading of spent nuclear fuel.

On 19 February 2010, at 2:45 in the afternoon, a fire broke out on the dismantled submarine in the hold of the third compartment during the gas-cutting work. There were no casualties and the spent nuclear fuel was unloaded by that time.

The K-480 structures were used for the construction of the strategic nuclear submarine Vladimir Monomakh.

=== Pennant numbers ===
Date	Pennant number
1991	669
2000	860
