= Russian Submarine Kuguar (K-337) =

Russian ship

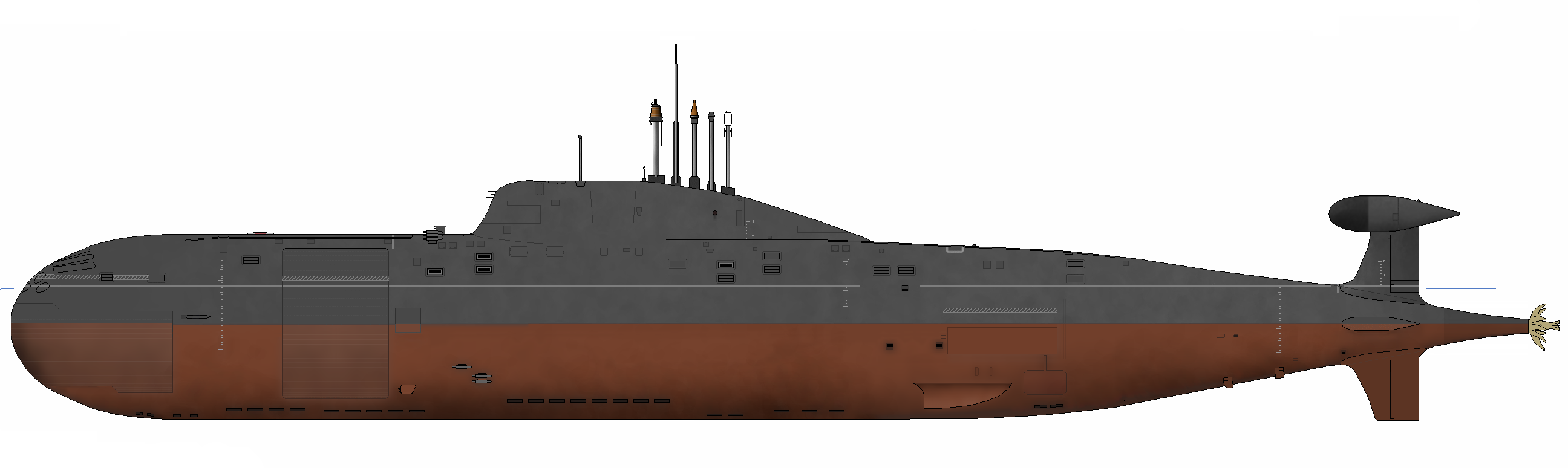
- Sketch of a Project 971U submarine, the same subtype as Kuguar

History

Russia
- Name: Kuguar
- Builder: Sevmash
- Laid down: 18 August 1992
- Fate: Never commissioned; parts scrapped and used for Yury Dolgorukiy

General characteristics
- Class & type: Project 971U Shchuka-B
- Type: Nuclear-powered attack submarine
- Displacement: 8,140 tonnes surfaced; 12,770 tonnes submerged
- Length: 114.3 m (375 ft)
- Beam: 13.6 m (45 ft)
- Draught: 9.7 m (32 ft)
- Propulsion: One 190 MWt OK-650V reactor
- Speed: 24 knots
- Complement: 62
- Armament: 4 × 533 mm torpedo tubes; 28 torpedoes; 4 × 650 mm torpedo tubes; 12 torpedoes; Naval mines; Torpedo tube-launched missiles

K-337 "Kuguar" (Russian: Күгүар, literally meaning "Cougar" or more indirectly, "panther") was a Project 971U (Щука-Б, literally "Pike-B"; NATO Reporting Name: Akula II Class) Russian Nuclear Powered Attack Submarine laid down on the 18th of August 1992 at Sevmash Shipyard, the submarine would never be commissioned, and in the end scrapped for parts that would be used for the Borei Class Submarine (Project 955) Yury Dolgorukiy commissioned in 2013.

== Construction ==
Laid down in Sevemash on the 18th of August 1992, the submarine was one of three Project 971U submarines on which construction was started. The Navy, when it initially ordered the ship, did not give the ship a name or enlist it in its registers, but on the 25th of January 1994, the Russian Navy officially entered the ship into its registers and gave it the name "Kuguar", after the cougar (alternatively referred to as the mountain lion or puma).

Work on the ship continued in the upcoming years, with a crew completely put together on the 1st of August, 1994 and the ship was launched at some point in the 1990s. This crew trained between 1994 and 1996 at the 270th Naval Training Center, after which they were dispatched to the 339th SSBN battalion as the ship was unprepared. Up till 1998, the ship remained dormant and between 1997 and 1998, the crew was assigned in part of the K-335 Gepard, with the entire crew eventually shifted to man that boat as work on the Kuguar eventually stopped in 1998 as funding dried out. Construction was cancelled officially on the 22nd of January, 1998, but the mothballed hulk and parts were not immediately scrapped or reused, possibly being set aside for later commissioning.

== Aftermath ==
In 2003, the parts and reserve were requisitioned for the construction of the Ballistic Missile Submarine K-535 Yury Dolgorukiy, with the bow and stern of the Kuguar and its likewise unfinished sister ship Rys were used to bookend the construction of the Borei Class Submarines, which was laid down in 1998 but only commissioned in 2012, the first SSBN commissioned into the Russian Navy since 1992. The K-157 Vepr is the only Akula II type submarine currently commissioned in the Russian Navy.

== See also ==
See Related

- Akula Class Submarine
- Borei Class Submarine
- K-157 Vepr
- K-535 Yury Dolgorukiy
