= Russian submarine Barnaul =

Akula-class submarine of the Russian Navy

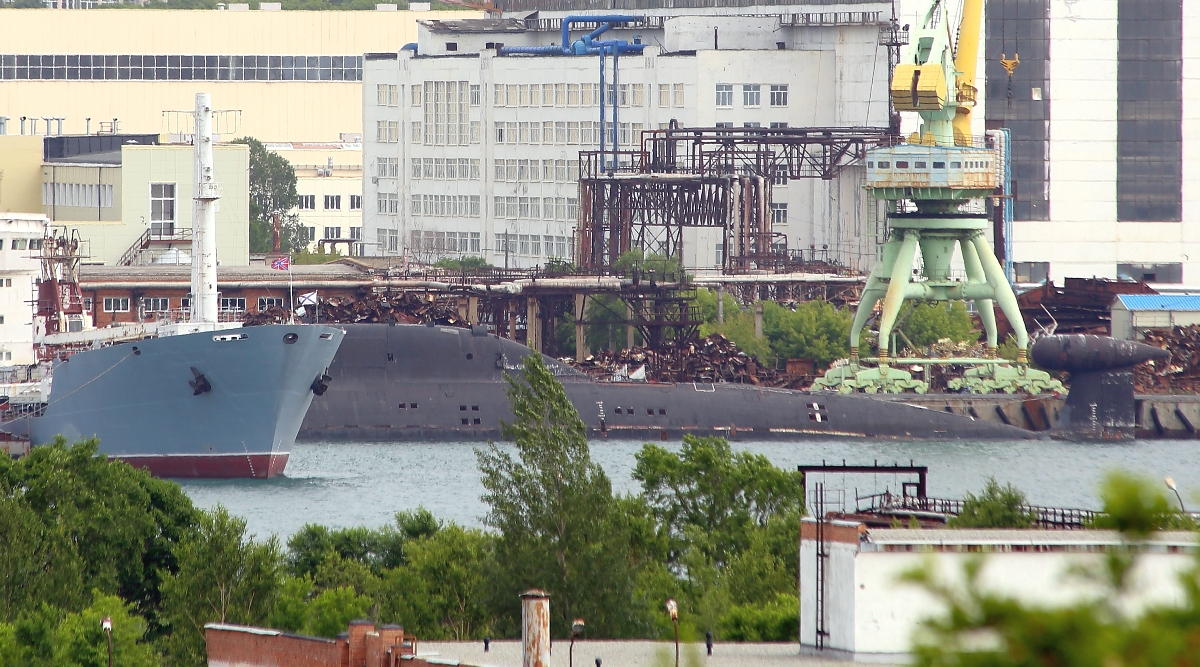
- Barnaul

History

Russia
- Name: K-263
- Builder: Amur Shipyard, Komsomolsk-on-Amur
- Yard number: 502
- Laid down: 9 May 1985
- Launched: 28 May 1986
- Commissioned: 30 December 1987
- Renamed: Barnaul; (Барнаул)
- Namesake: Barnaul
- Decommissioned: 2011
- Identification: Pennant number: 974
- Status: Decommissioned

General characteristics
- Class & type: Akula-class submarine
- Displacement: 8,010–14,470 long tons (8,140–14,700 t) surfaced; 12,570 long tons (12,770 t) submerged
- Length: 110.3 m (361 ft 11 in) maximum
- Beam: 13.6 m (44 ft 7 in)
- Draught: 9.7 m (31 ft 10 in)
- Propulsion: one 190 MW OK-650B/OK-650M pressurized water nuclear reactor (HEU <= 45%); 1 OK-7 steam turbine 43,000 hp (32 MW); 2 OK-2 Turbogenerators producing 2 MW; 1 seven-bladed propeller; 2 OK-300 retractable electric propulsors for low-speed and quiet maneuvering at 5 knots (9.3 km/h; 5.8 mph)
- Speed: 10 knots (19 km/h; 12 mph) surfaced; 28–35 knots (52–65 km/h; 32–40 mph) submerged
- Endurance: 100 days
- Test depth: 480 m (1,570 ft)
- Complement: 73
- Sensors & processing systems: MGK-500 or 540 active/passive suite; Flank arrays; Pelamida towed array sonar; MG-70 mine detection sonar
- Electronic warfare & decoys: Bukhta ESM/ECM; MG-74 Korund noise simulation decoys (fired from external tubes); MT-70 Sonar intercept receiver; Nikhrom-M IFF
- Armament: 4 × 533 mm torpedo tubes (28 torpedoes) and 4 × 650 mm torpedo tubes (12 torpedoes).; 1–3 × Igla-M surface-to-air missile launcher fired from sail (surface use only); Granat cruise missiles, now Kalibr
- Notes: Chiblis surface search radar; Medvyeditsa-945 navigation system; Molniya-M Satellite communications; MGK-80 Underwater communications; Tsunami, Kiparis, Anis, Sintez and Kora communications antennas; Paravan Towed VLF antenna; Vspletsk combat direction system

K-263 Barnaul was an Akula-class submarine of the Russian Navy.

== Design ==
Project 971 has a double-hull design. The robust body is made of high-quality alloy steel with σт = 1 GPa (10,000 kgf / cm^{2}). To simplify the installation of equipment, the boat was designed using zonal blocks, which made it possible to transfer a significant amount of work from the cramped conditions of the sub's compartments directly to the workshop. After completion of the installation, the zonal unit is “rolled” into the hull of the boat and connected to the main cables and pipelines of the ship's systems. A two-stage damping system is used: all mechanisms are placed on damped foundations, in addition, each zone unit is isolated from the body by rubber-cord pneumatic shock absorbers. In addition to reducing the overall noise level of nuclear submarines, such a scheme can reduce the impact of underwater explosions on equipment and crew. The boat has a developed vertical tail unit with a streamlined boule, in which the towed antenna is located. Also on the submarine are two reclining thrusters and retractable bow horizontal rudders with flaps. A feature of the project is the smoothly mated connection of the tail unit to the hull. This is done to reduce noise-generating hydrodynamic eddies.

Power supply is carried out by a nuclear power plant. The lead boat, K-284 Akula, is equipped with an OK-650M.01 pressurized water-cooled nuclear reactor. On later orders, the AEU has minor improvements. Some sources report that subsequent boats are equipped with OK-9VM reactors. The thermal power of the reactor is 190 MW, the shaft power is 50,000 liters. Two auxiliary electric motors in the hinged outboard columns have a capacity of 410 hp. There is one diesel generator ASDG-1000.

== Construction and career ==
The submarine was laid down on 9 May 1985 at Amur Shipyard, Komsomolsk-on-Amur. Launched on 28 May 1986 and commissioned on 30 December 1987.

On 28 April 1992, she was reclassified as a nuclear submarine.

In 1993, she won the prize of the Commander-in-Chief of the Navy for the best mine setting.

On 13 April 1993, he received the name Delfin.

His last voyage took place in September 1997.

In March 1998, she was transferred to the 10th DPL of the 2nd FLPL of the Pacific Fleet.

On 9 February 2002, the boat was given the name Barnaul in connection with the establishment of patronage over it by the administration of the city of Barnaul.

In 2006, he was sent for repairs to the Zvezda Far East Plant in the city of Bolshoy Kamen.

Due to the financing and workload of the plant with other orders, the repair of the boat did not begin until 2013. In the same year, it was decided to dispose of the submarine until 2016. This is largely due to the fact that Barnaul was used as a donor of spare parts for the restoration of other ships of its class.

In 2014, it was announced that the Zvezda Far East shipyard would repair the boat by the end of 2014, but the renovation never started.

In 2018, the first reports appeared that work was planned to dismantle the ship.

The boat was disposed of in PD-41 together with SSV-33 Ural between 2018 and 2019.
