= Russian submarine Akula =

Two submarines operated by Russia have been named Akula

- Russian submarine Akula (1909), a submarine launched in 1909 for the Imperial Russian Navy and served in World War I. The submarine was sunk by a naval mine on 28 November 1915.
- Russian submarine Akula (K-284), the lead boat of the Akula-class submarines that was launched in 1984 and operated with both the Soviet and Russian navies. The ship was decommissioned in 2001
