= Russian submarine Leopard =

Akula-class submarine of the Russian Navy

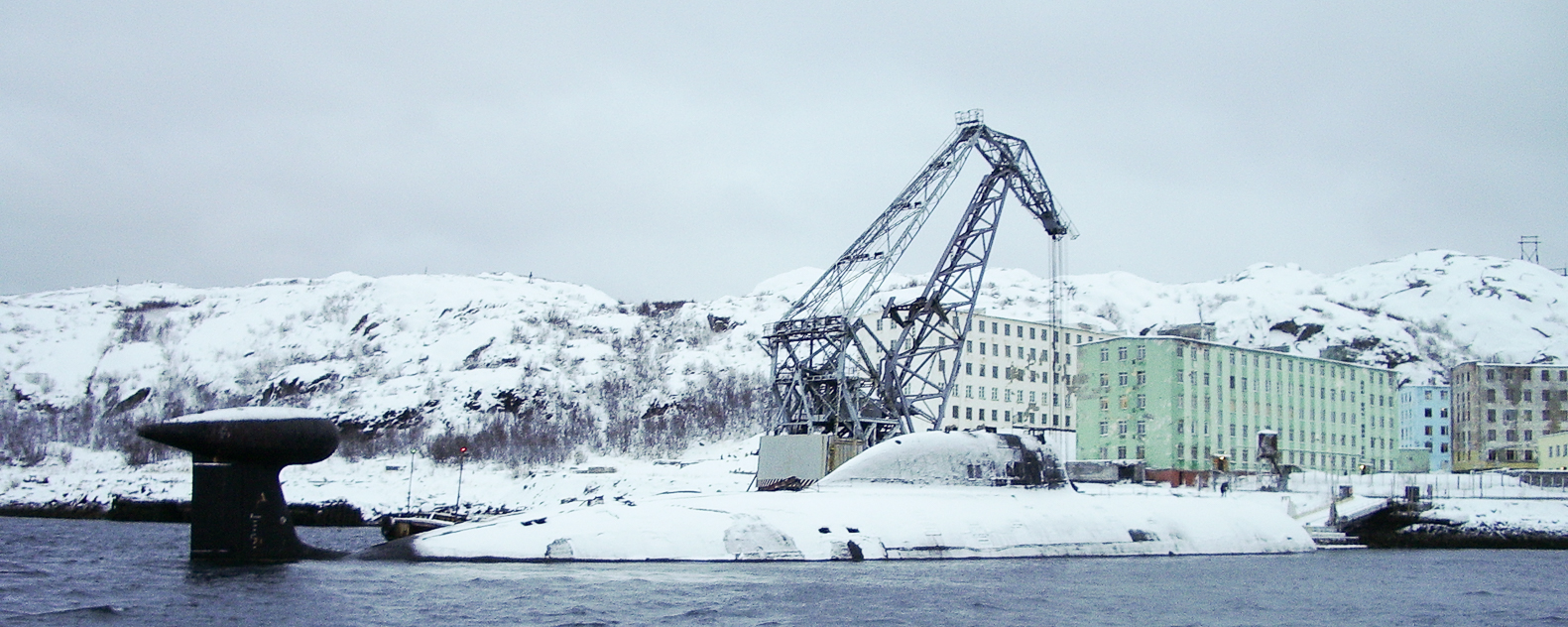
- Leopard

History

Russia
- Name: K-328
- Builder: Sevmash, Severodvinsk
- Yard number: 832
- Laid down: 26 October 1988
- Launched: 28 June 1992
- Commissioned: 30 December 1992
- Renamed: Leopard; (Леопард)
- Namesake: Leopard
- Identification: Pennant number: 872
- Status: Active

General characteristics
- Class & type: Akula-class submarine
- Displacement: 8,010–14,470 long tons (8,140–14,700 t) surfaced; 12,570 long tons (12,770 t) submerged
- Length: 110.3 m (361 ft 11 in) maximum
- Beam: 13.6 m (44 ft 7 in)
- Draught: 9.7 m (31 ft 10 in)
- Propulsion: one 190 MW OK-650B/OK-650M pressurized water nuclear reactor (HEU <= 45%); 1 OK-7 steam turbine 43,000 hp (32 MW); 2 OK-2 Turbogenerators producing 2 MW; 1 seven-bladed propeller; 2 OK-300 retractable electric propulsors for low-speed and quiet maneuvering at 5 knots (9.3 km/h; 5.8 mph)
- Speed: 10 knots (19 km/h; 12 mph) surfaced; 28–35 knots (52–65 km/h; 32–40 mph) submerged
- Endurance: 100 days
- Test depth: 480 m (1,570 ft)
- Complement: 73
- Sensors & processing systems: MGK-500 or 540 active/passive suite; Flank arrays; Pelamida towed array sonar; MG-70 mine detection sonar
- Electronic warfare & decoys: Bukhta ESM/ECM; MG-74 Korund noise simulation decoys (fired from external tubes); MT-70 Sonar intercept receiver; Nikhrom-M IFF
- Armament: 4 × 533 mm torpedo tubes (28 torpedoes) and 4 × 650 mm torpedo tubes (12 torpedoes).; 1–3 × Igla-M surface-to-air missile launcher fired from sail (surface use only); Granat cruise missiles, now Kalibr
- Notes: Chiblis Surface Search radar; Medvyeditsa-945 Navigation system; Molniya-M Satellite communications; MGK-80 Underwater communications; Tsunami, Kiparis, Anis, Sintez and Kora Communications antennas; Paravan Towed VLF Antenna; Vspletsk Combat direction system

K-328 Leopard is an Akula-class submarine in the Russian Navy.

== Design ==
Project 971 has a double-hull design. The robust body is made of high-quality alloy steel with σт = 1 GPa (10,000 kgf / cm^{2}). To simplify the installation of equipment, the boat was designed using zonal blocks, which made it possible to transfer a significant amount of work from the cramped conditions of the sub's compartments directly to the workshop. After completion of the installation, the zonal unit is “rolled” into the hull of the boat and connected to the main cables and pipelines of the ship's systems. A two-stage damping system is used: all mechanisms are placed on damped foundations, in addition, each zone unit is isolated from the body by rubber-cord pneumatic shock absorbers. In addition to reducing the overall noise level of nuclear submarines, such a scheme can reduce the impact of underwater explosions on equipment and crew. The boat has a developed vertical tail unit with a streamlined boule, in which the towed antenna is located. Also on the submarine are two reclining thrusters and retractable bow horizontal rudders with flaps. A feature of the project is the smoothly mated connection of the tail unit to the hull. This is done to reduce noise-generating hydrodynamic eddies.

Power supply is carried out by a nuclear power plant. The lead boat, K-284 Akula, is equipped with an OK-650M.01 pressurized water-cooled nuclear reactor. On later orders, the AEU has minor improvements. Some sources report that subsequent boats are equipped with OK-9VM reactors. The thermal power of the reactor is 190 MW, the shaft power is 50,000 liters. with. Two auxiliary electric motors in the hinged outboard columns have a capacity of 410 hp. with., there is one diesel generator ASDG-1000.

== Construction and career ==
The submarine was laid down on 26 October 1988 at Sevmash, Severodvinsk. Launched on 28 June 1992 and commissioned on 30 December 1992.

From June to September 1994, he performed combat service with the 608th naval crew under the command of A.A. Popov. From 16 April to 4 July 1994, military service in the Atlantic was performed. Onboard was the K-317 crew under the command of S.V. Spravtsev.

From 12 May to 23 July 1999, combat service was performed with a regular crew.

From 12 February to 13 April 2000, combat service with the 608th crew on board, commander S. E. Kavlis.

From October to November 2001 and 2002, two more military services were performed, the commander of both was K. E. Onushkov.

From 2006 to 2007, he underwent a medium repair at Sevmash.

Since the end of June 2011, he has been at the Zvyozdochka CS under repair and refurbishment according to Project 971M, which is scheduled to be completed in 2021, the ship will have to meet the requirements of the 4th generation nuclear submarine.

On 25 December 2020, he was launched after repairs and modernization, is being completed and is being prepared for tests that will take at least six months.

At one point projected to re-enter service during 2021, but now projected as likely to begin post-refit sea trials in 2022.

On 2 March 2023, it was reported that Leopard had been expected to return to service with the Northern Fleet in December 2023.

On 8 June 2026, it was reported that Leopard went to sea for the first time after 15 years of maintenance. She was expected to be fully operational by the end of 2026.
