= Russian submarine Samara =

Akula-class submarine of the Russian Navy

History

Russia
- Name: K-295
- Builder: Amur Shipyard, Komsomolsk-on-Amur
- Yard number: 517
- Laid down: 7 November 1993
- Launched: 5 August 1994
- Commissioned: 17 July 1995
- Renamed: Samara; (Самара)
- Namesake: Samara
- Identification: See Pennant numbers
- Status: Active

General characteristics
- Class & type: Akula II-class submarine
- Displacement: 8,320–8,340 long tons (8,450–8,470 t) surfaced; 13,260–13,580 long tons (13,470–13,800 t) submerged
- Length: 113.3 m (371 ft 9 in) maximum
- Beam: 13.6 m (44 ft 7 in)
- Draught: 9.7 m (31 ft 10 in)
- Propulsion: one 190 MW OK-650B/OK-650M pressurized water nuclear reactor (HEU<= 45%); 1 OK-7 steam turbine 43,000 hp (32 MW); 2 OK-2 Turbogenerators producing 2 MW; 1 seven-bladed propeller; 2 OK-300 retractable electric propulsors for low-speed and quiet maneuvering at 5 knots (9.3 km/h; 5.8 mph)
- Speed: 10 knots (19 km/h; 12 mph) surfaced; 28–35 knots (52–65 km/h; 32–40 mph) submerged
- Endurance: 100 days
- Test depth: 520 m (1,710 ft)
- Complement: 62 (31 officers)
- Sensors & processing systems: MGK-500 or 540 active/passive suite; Flank arrays; Pelamida towed array sonar; MG-70 mine detection sonar
- Electronic warfare & decoys: Bukhta ESM/ECM; MG-74 Korund noise simulation decoys (fired from external tubes); MT-70 Sonar intercept receiver; Nikhrom-M IFF
- Armament: 4 × 533 mm torpedo tubes (28 torpedoes) and 4 × 650 mm torpedo tubes (12 torpedoes).; 1–3 × Igla-M surface-to-air missile launcher fired from sail (surface use only); Granat cruise missiles, now Kalibr
- Notes: Chiblis Surface Search radar; Medvyeditsa-945 Navigation system; Molniya-M Satellite communications; MGK-80 Underwater communications; Tsunami, Kiparis, Anis, Sintez and Kora Communications antennas; Paravan Towed VLF Antenna; Vspletsk Combat direction system

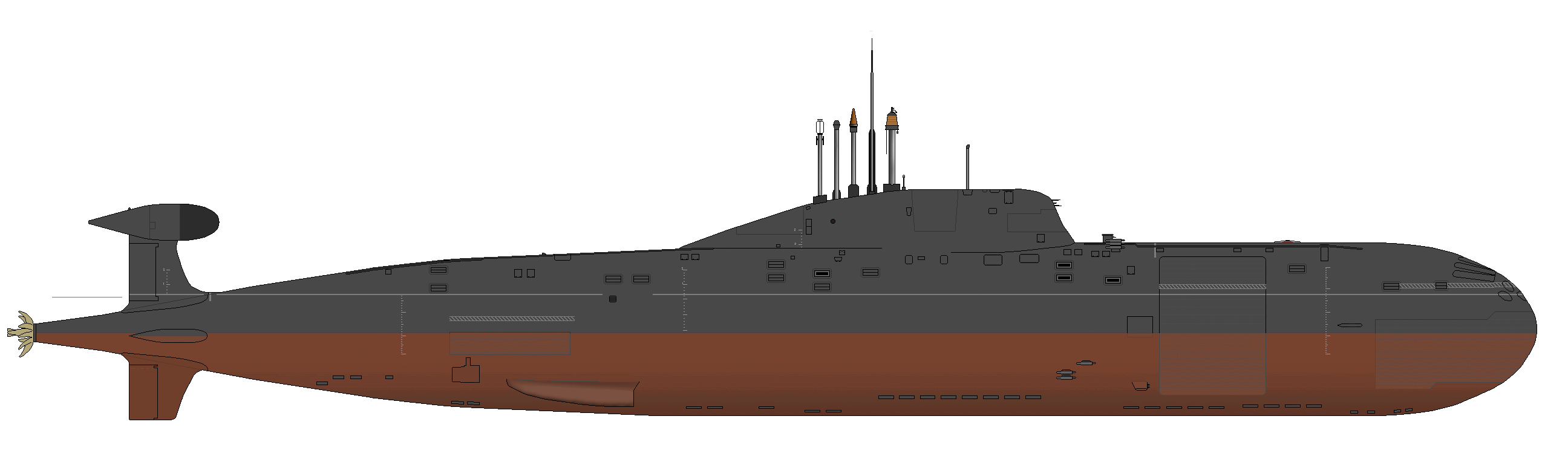
Akula Class Submarine (K-295)

K-295 Samara is an Akula-class submarine in the Russian Navy.

== Design ==
Project 971 has a double-hull design. The robust body is made of high-quality alloy steel with σт = 1 GPa (10,000 kgf / cm^{2}). To simplify the installation of equipment, the boat was designed using zonal blocks, which made it possible to transfer a significant amount of work from the cramped conditions of the sub's compartments directly to the workshop. After completion of the installation, the zonal unit is "rolled" into the hull of the boat and connected to the main cables and pipelines of the ship's systems. A two-stage damping system is used: all mechanisms are placed on damped foundations, in addition, each zone unit is isolated from the body by rubber-cord pneumatic shock absorbers. In addition to reducing the overall noise level of nuclear submarines, such a scheme can reduce the impact of underwater explosions on equipment and crew. The boat has a developed vertical tail unit with a streamlined boule, in which the towed antenna is located. Also on the submarine are two reclining thrusters and retractable bow horizontal rudders with flaps. A feature of the project is the smoothly mated connection of the tail unit to the hull. This is done to reduce noise-generating hydrodynamic eddies.

Power supply is carried out by a nuclear power plant. The lead boat, Akula, is equipped with an OK-650M.01 pressurized water-cooled nuclear reactor. On later orders, the AEU was given minor improvements. Some sources report that subsequent boats are equipped with OK-9VM reactors. The thermal power of the reactor is 190 MW, the shaft power is 50,000 liters. with. Two auxiliary electric motors in the hinged outboard columns have a capacity of 410 hp and there is one diesel generator ASDG-1000.

== Construction and career ==
The submarine was laid down on 7 November 1993 at Amur Shipyard, Komsomolsk-on-Amur. Launched on 5 August 1994 and commissioned on 17 July 1995. On 29 December 1995, the boat was included in the Pacific Fleet. It became a part of the 45th Submarine Division of the 2nd Submarine Flotilla based on the Krasheninnikov Bay (Vilyuchinsk). On the same day it received the name Drakon.

On 4 December 1997, the name of the boat was transferred from the Project 627A K-133, which was decommissioned from the fleet. In 1998, the submarine was listed in the 10th Submarine Division of the 2nd Submarine Flotilla of the Pacific Fleet with the former base. On 20 August 1999, the submarine received the name Samara.

Samara underwent refit in 2010 and in July, the boat participated in the parade of ships in the Amur Bay on the roadstead of Vladivostok in honor of the Navy Day.

As of 8 October 2013, the submarine was ordered for medium repair and deep modernization at the Severodvinsk JSC Zvyozdochka Ship Repair Center, where it is due to arrive between July and August 2014. The transfer to Severodvinsk will be carried out via the Northern Sea Route. As of 21 August 2014, the boat, together with K-391 Bratsk of Project 971, was being prepared for transportation to Severodvinsk for modernization at the Zvezdochka Ship Repair Center. On 26 September 2014, Samara and Bratsk were delivered to Severodvinsk along the Northern Sea Route from Kamchatka by the Dutch dock Transshelf for deep modernization. The renovation may result in her return to service in the mid-to-latter 2020s.

=== Pennant numbers ===
Date	Pennant number
1995	170
2000	970
