= Gepard =

Gepard, meaning "cheetah" in a number of languages, may refer to:

- Flakpanzer Gepard, a German self-propelled anti-aircraft gun
- Flakpanzer 38(t), German self-propelled anti-aircraft gun used in World War II
- Gepárd anti-materiel rifle, a family of Hungarian heavy sniper rifles
- Gepard (submachine gun), Russian small arm
- Gepard-class frigate, a class of frigates built in Russia
- Gepard-class fast attack craft, a class of patrol vessels built for the German Navy
- Gepard (K-335), a Russian Navy Akula III-class submarine
- Gepard, a playable character in Honkai: Star Rail
