= Russian submarine Pantera =

Akula-class submarine of the Russian Navy

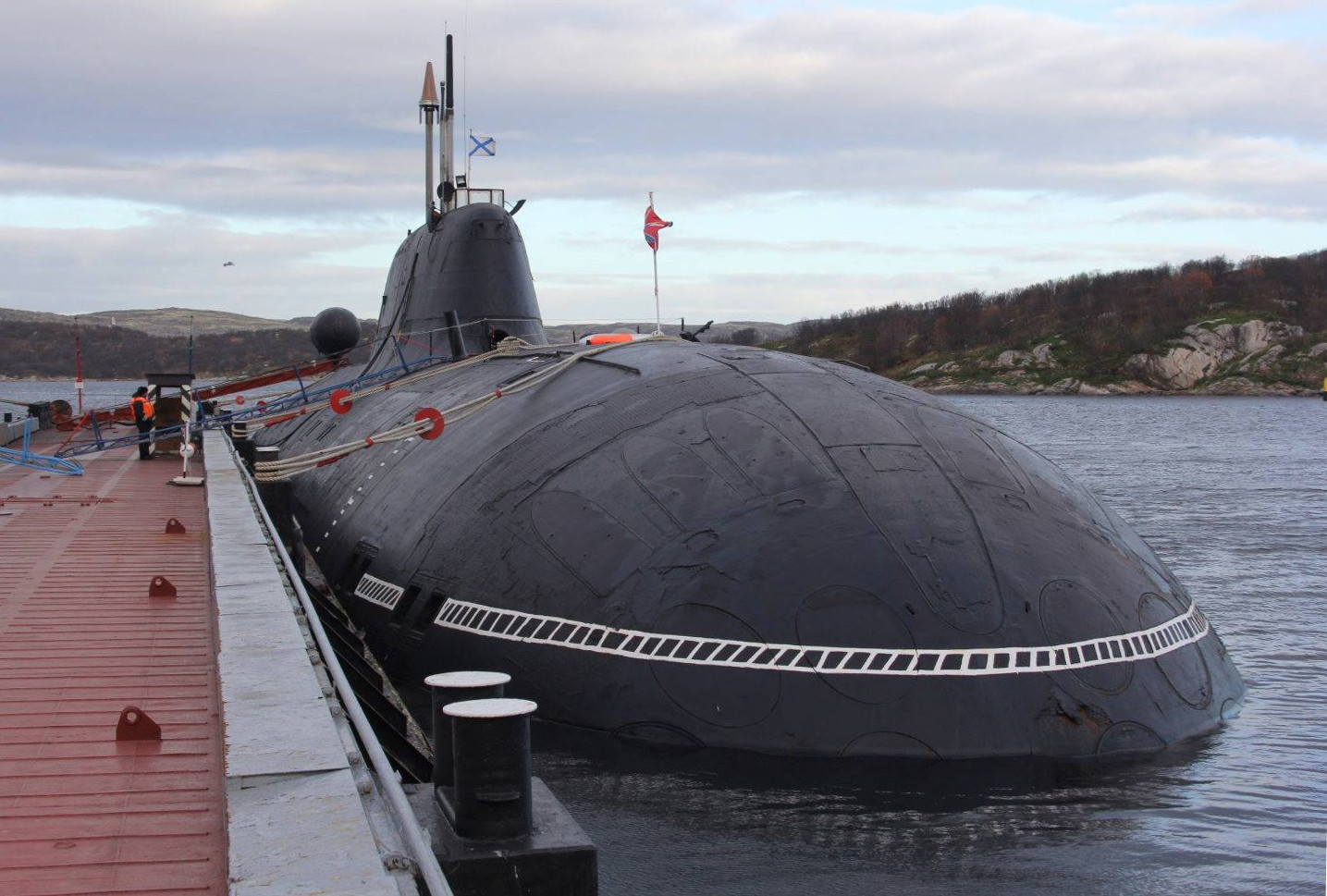
- Pantera

History

Russia
- Name: K-317
- Builder: Sevmash, Severodvinsk
- Yard number: 822
- Laid down: 6 November 1986
- Launched: 21 May 1990
- Commissioned: 27 December 1990
- Renamed: Pantera
- Namesake: Panthera
- Home port: Gadzhiyevo
- Identification: See Pennant numbers
- Status: Active

General characteristics
- Class & type: Akula-class submarine
- Displacement: 8,010–14,470 long tons (8,140–14,700 t) surfaced; 12,570 long tons (12,770 t) submerged
- Length: 110.3 m (361 ft 11 in) maximum
- Beam: 13.6 m (44 ft 7 in)
- Draught: 9.7 m (31 ft 10 in)
- Propulsion: one 190 MW OK-650B/OK-650M pressurized water nuclear reactor (HEU <= 45%); 1 OK-7 steam turbine 43,000 hp (32 MW); 2 OK-2 Turbogenerators producing 2 MW; 1 seven-bladed propeller; 2 OK-300 retractable electric propulsors for low-speed and quiet maneuvering at 5 knots (9.3 km/h; 5.8 mph)
- Speed: 10 knots (19 km/h; 12 mph) surfaced; 28–35 knots (52–65 km/h; 32–40 mph) submerged
- Endurance: 100 days
- Test depth: 480 m (1,570 ft)
- Complement: 73
- Sensors & processing systems: MGK-500 or 540 active/passive suite; Flank arrays; Pelamida towed array sonar; MG-70 mine detection sonar
- Electronic warfare & decoys: Bukhta ESM/ECM; MG-74 Korund noise simulation decoys (fired from external tubes); MT-70 Sonar intercept receiver; Nikhrom-M IFF
- Armament: 4 × 533 mm torpedo tubes (28 torpedoes) and 4 × 650 mm torpedo tubes (12 torpedoes).; 1–3 × Igla-M surface-to-air missile launcher fired from sail (surface use only); Granat cruise missiles
- Notes: Chiblis Surface Search radar; Medvyeditsa-945 Navigation system; Molniya-M Satellite communications; MGK-80 Underwater communications; Tsunami, Kiparis, Anis, Sintez and Kora Communications antennas; Paravan Towed VLF Antenna; Vspletsk Combat direction system

K-317 Pantera (Russian: Пантера, lit. 'panther') is an Akula-class submarine in the Russian Navy.

== Design ==
Project 971 has a double-hull design. The robust body is made of high-quality alloy steel with σт = 1 GPa (10,000 kgf / cm²). To simplify the installation of equipment, the boat was designed using zonal blocks, which made it possible to transfer a significant amount of work from the cramped conditions of the sub's compartments directly to the workshop. After completion of the installation, the zonal unit is “rolled” into the hull of the boat and connected to the main cables and pipelines of the ship's systems. A two-stage damping system is used: all mechanisms are placed on damped foundations, in addition, each zone unit is isolated from the body by rubber-cord pneumatic shock absorbers. In addition to reducing the overall noise level of nuclear submarines, such a scheme can reduce the impact of underwater explosions on equipment and crew. The boat has a developed vertical tail unit with a streamlined boule, in which the towed antenna is located. Also on the submarine are two reclining thrusters and retractable bow horizontal rudders with flaps. A feature of the project is the smoothly mated connection of the tail unit to the hull. This is done to reduce noise-generating hydrodynamic eddies.

Power supply is carried out by a nuclear power plant. The lead boat, K-284 Akula, is equipped with an OK-650M.01 pressurized water-cooled nuclear reactor. On later orders, the AEU has minor improvements. Some sources report that subsequent boats are equipped with OK-9VM reactors. The thermal power of the reactor is 190 MW, the shaft power is 50,000 liters. with. Two auxiliary electric motors in the hinged outboard columns have a capacity of 410 hp. with., there is one diesel generator ASDG-1000.

== Construction and career ==
The submarine was laid down on 6 November 1986 at Sevmash, Severodvinsk. Launched on 21 May 1990 and commissioned on 27 December 1990.

Initially, the boat carried only tactical numbers, but on 10 October 1990, the Commander-in-Chief of the USSR Navy V.N. which opened in 1919, gave the name Pantera.

In 1993, under the leadership of Captain I Rank Vasily Mikhalchuk, the crew of the boat won the prize of the Commander-in-Chief of the Navy and took first place in the Navy in anti-submarine training.

In 1996, during a military campaign, as a result of an accident in the refrigeration system, freon began to flow into the compartments, the crew was able to eliminate the malfunction on their own without surfacing.

In January 1999, the commander of the submarine, Captain 1st Rank Sergei Spravtsev was awarded the title of Hero of Russia.

Until the end of the 1990s, he made 2 military campaigns and performed a search operation.

The submarine needed to replace the battery, the GAK needed to be repaired.

On 2 November 2006, during the welding work in the third compartment, a fire broke out. Two firefighters were poisoned by combustion products.

His overhaul and modernization were completed in 2007. During the repair, the hydroacoustic complex, communication and control equipment were modernized.

On 28 January 2008, after the completion of the repair, he was accepted into the combat composition of the Navy. he became a part of the 24th submarine of the 12th Eskpl of the Northern Fleet (Gadzhiyevo) based in the Yagelnaya Bay of the Sayda Bay. As of 2022, she was reported as possibly in reserve.

=== Pennant numbers ===
Date	Pennant number
1991	039
2000	878
