= K157 =

K157 or K-157 may refer to:

- K-157 (Kansas highway), a state highway in Kansas
- Russian submarine Vepr (K-157), a Russian submarine
