= Russian submarine Gepard =

Akula-class submarine of the Russian Navy

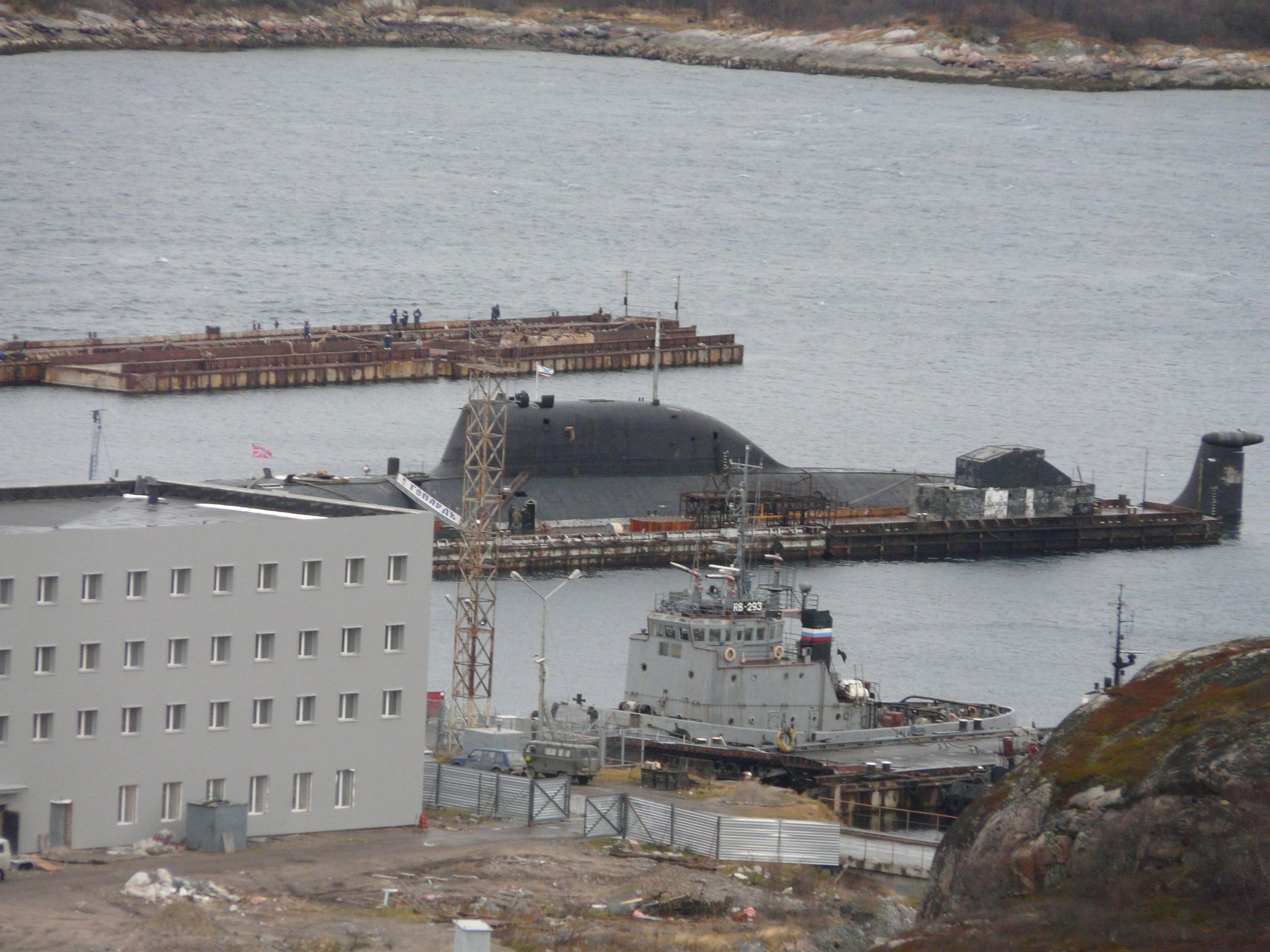
- Gepard moored in Gadzhiyevo

History

Russia
- Name: K-335
- Builder: Sevmash, Severodvinsk
- Yard number: 835
- Laid down: 23 September 1991
- Launched: 17 September 1999
- Commissioned: 5 December 2001
- Renamed: Gepard; (Гепард)
- Namesake: Gepard
- Identification: Pennant number: 895
- Fate: Active

General characteristics
- Class & type: Akula III-class submarine
- Displacement: 8,320–8,340 long tons (8,450–8,470 t) surfaced; 13,260–13,580 long tons (13,470–13,800 t) submerged
- Length: 113.3 m (371 ft 9 in) maximum
- Beam: 13.6 m (44 ft 7 in)
- Draught: 9.7 m (31 ft 10 in)
- Propulsion: one 190 MW OK-650B/OK-650M pressurized water nuclear reactor; 1 OK-7 steam turbine 43,000 hp (32 MW); 2 OK-2 Turbogenerators producing 2 MW; 1 seven-bladed propeller; 2 OK-300 retractable electric propulsors for low-speed and quiet maneuvering at 5 knots (9.3 km/h; 5.8 mph)
- Speed: 10 knots (19 km/h; 12 mph) surfaced; 28–35 knots (52–65 km/h; 32–40 mph) submerged
- Endurance: 100 days
- Test depth: 520 m (1,710 ft)
- Complement: 62 (31 officers)
- Sensors & processing systems: MGK-500 or 540 active/passive suite; Flank arrays; Pelamida towed array sonar; MG-70 mine detection sonar
- Electronic warfare & decoys: Bukhta ESM/ECM; MG-74 Korund noise simulation decoys (fired from external tubes); MT-70 Sonar intercept receiver; Nikhrom-M IFF
- Armament: 4 × 533 mm torpedo tubes (28 torpedoes) and 4 × 650 mm torpedo tubes (12 torpedoes).; 1–3 × Igla-M surface-to-air missile launcher fired from sail (surface use only); Granat cruise missiles, now Kalibr
- Notes: Chiblis Surface Search radar; Medvyeditsa-945 Navigation system; Molniya-M Satellite communications; MGK-80 Underwater communications; Tsunami, Kiparis, Anis, Sintez and Kora Communications antennas; Paravan Towed VLF Antenna; Vspletsk Combat direction system

The K-335 Gepard (Russian: Гепард, lit. 'cheetah') is an Akula-class submarine in the Russian Navy.

== Design ==
Project 971 has a double-hull design. The robust body is made of high-quality alloy steel with σт = 1 GPa (10,000 kgf / cm^{2}). To simplify the installation of equipment, the boat was designed using zonal blocks, which made it possible to transfer a significant amount of work from the cramped conditions of the sub's compartments directly to the workshop. After completion of the installation, the zonal unit is “rolled” into the hull of the boat and connected to the main cables and pipelines of the ship's systems. A two-stage damping system is used: all mechanisms are placed on damped foundations, in addition, each zone unit is isolated from the body by rubber-cord pneumatic shock absorbers. In addition to reducing the overall noise level of nuclear submarines, such a scheme can reduce the impact of underwater explosions on equipment and crew. The boat has a developed vertical tail unit with a streamlined boule, in which the towed antenna is located. Also on the submarine are two reclining thrusters and retractable bow horizontal rudders with flaps. A feature of the project is the smoothly mated connection of the tail unit to the hull. This is done to reduce noise-generating hydrodynamic eddies.

Power supply is carried out by a nuclear power plant. The lead boat, K-284 Akula, is equipped with an OK-650M.01 pressurized water-cooled nuclear reactor. On later orders, the AEU has minor improvements. Some sources report that subsequent boats are equipped with OK-9VM reactors. The thermal power of the reactor is 190 MW, the shaft power is 50,000 liters. with. Two auxiliary electric motors in the hinged outboard columns have a capacity of 410 hp. with., there is one diesel generator ASDG-1000.

== Construction and career ==
The building of Russian nuclear submarines significantly slowed in the 2000s, so over the entire decade, К-335 Gepard was the only new nuclear submarine for ten years.

The submarine was laid down on 23 September 1991 at Sevmash, Severodvinsk. Launched on 17 September 1999 and commissioned on 5 December 2001 into the Northern Fleet. On 22 February 1993, he was renamed Gepard.

In mid-January 2012, information about a fire on a boat appeared in the press. The Ministry of Defense of the Russian Federation officially denied information about the fire, and stated that a small fire occurred on the submarine from a broken portable lamp, which was quickly extinguished by the LOCH system, there were no injuries, no damage, the service on the boat was in normal mode. The fire occurred during the maintenance of the boat at the 10th shipyard, an alcohol lamp was dropped by a plant worker, the fire extinguishing system worked twice.

On the night of 11 February 2012, the torpedo compartment commander, senior lieutenant Maxim Galkin, was found hanged on the Gepard nuclear submarine. A pre-investigation check is underway under article 110 of the Criminal Code of the Russian Federation and ruled it as a suicide.

In March 2014, the shipboard crew of the cruising nuclear submarine Gepard was awarded the Challenge Cup of the Commander of the Northern Fleet (SF) based on the results of the professional skill competition.

In November 2015, the Gepard nuclear submarine returned to service after the restoration of technical readiness at the Nerpa shipyard. The nuclear-powered ship joined the composition of the warships of the submarine forces of the Northern Fleet.

In 2020, the former commander of Gepard, Dmitry Maslov was awarded the title Hero of Russia.

On 18 June 2021, in the Barents Sea, as part of a planned tactical exercise at the Northern Fleet's combat training grounds, the nuclear-powered cruising submarine Gepard performed a torpedo attack by a detachment of imaginary enemy ships with salvo firing with practical (training) ammunition. The combat exercise was recognized as successful. After completing the attack, the submariners practiced a maneuver of evasion and evasion from a retaliatory strike.
