= K154 =

K154 or K-154 may refer to:

- K-154 (Kansas highway), a former state highway in Kansas
- Russian submarine Tigr (K-154), a Russian submarine
