= Russian submarine Vepr =

Russian Akula-class submarine

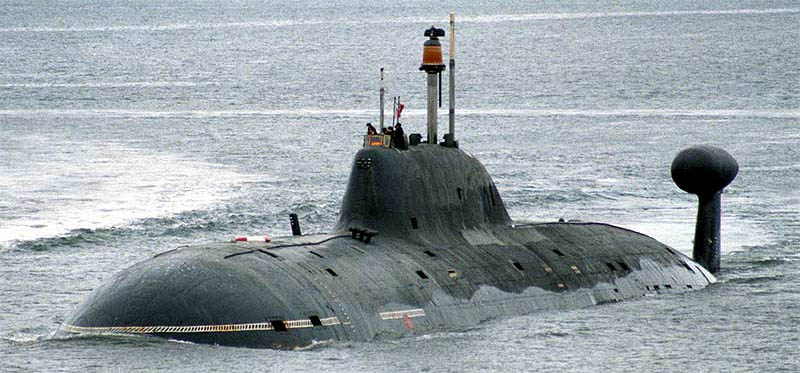
- K-157 Vepr in 2008

History
- Name: Vepr
- Builder: Sevmash
- Laid down: 16 June 1990
- Launched: 10 December 1994
- Christened: 6 April 1993
- Completed: 29 June 1995
- Commissioned: 25 November 1995
- Home port: Gadzhievo
- Status: in active service

General characteristics
- Class & type: nuclear-powered attack submarine
- Type: Project 971U Shchuka-B (Akula-II)
- Displacement: 8,140 tonnes surfaced, 12,770 tonnes submerged
- Length: 114.3 meters
- Beam: 13.6 meters
- Draught: 9.7 meters
- Propulsion: one 190MWt OK-650V reactor
- Speed: 24 knots
- Complement: 62 sailors
- Armament: 4 × 533 mm torpedo tubes (28 torpedoes), naval mines and 4 × 650 mm torpedo tubes (12 torpedoes), also torpedo tube launched missiles

Vepr (K-157) (Russian: Вепрь, literally means "wild boar") is a Project 971 Shchuka-B (also known by the NATO reporting name Akula-II) class nuclear-powered attack submarine of the Russian Navy. Her keel was laid down on 16 June 1990 by Sevmash. She was launched on 10 December 1994, commissioned on 25 November 1995, and homeported in Gadzhievo. Vepr is armed with four 533 mm torpedo tubes which can use Type 53 torpedoes, RPK-6 or the RPK-2 missiles - older type and Kalibr type armament, naval mines, and four 650 mm torpedo tubes which can use Type 65 torpedoes, or the RPK-7 missile. The submarine is of a unique design within the Akula-class (identified as a Project 971A variant) featuring a "3- to 4-meter hull extension (“plug”) inserted aft of the sail to house more advanced quieting systems and machinery rafting".

== Operational history ==
=== 1998 incident ===
Shortly before midnight, 10 September 1998, Vepr was in port at Severomorsk with the crew of its sistership K-461 Volk aboard. Alexander Kuzminykh (Russian: Александр Кузьминых), a 19-year-old seaman who was being detained on punishment charges, broke out of his quarters, killed his guard by stabbing him with a chisel, then seized his AKS-74U assault rifle and fatally shot five more sailors. He then took two hostages, whom he later killed.

He barricaded himself in the torpedo room, and for 20 hours repeatedly threatened to set a fire to detonate the torpedoes. While Vepr had no nuclear weapons and her reactor was shut down, the detonation of her torpedoes while she was tied up at the dock would have ruptured her reactor, creating what the regional director of the Federal Security Service (FSB), Vladimir Prikhodko described as "a nuclear catastrophe ... a second Chernobyl."

Attempts to persuade him to surrender failed. Kuzminykh's mother was flown to the naval base but was unable to persuade her son to give himself up. The situation remained a standoff until early on the morning of 12 September, when a special anti-terrorist commando unit of the Russian Federal Security Service (FSB) stormed the torpedo room. Early reports indicated that he had been killed by the FSB, but later reports indicated that he committed suicide. FSB officers stated that "there was no way to preserve Alexander Kuzminykh's life."

Kuzminykh was found fit when he was conscripted at a Saint Petersburg enlistment office, even though he had suffered from a mental disorder and had been inhaling intoxicants. When Kuzminykh volunteered for the submarine service, he passed additional medical and psychiatric tests with high marks. It was later declared that he suffered from a mental illness that was not detected in the draft. In the aftermath of the incident Russia made efforts to improve recruitment and monitoring of military personnel deployed on nuclear-powered vessels. Only professional, non-conscript sailors could serve on them.

== Refurbishment ==
The submarine was the first of the Akula classes (Project 971 and 971U) to be refurbished. All of them will be equipped to carry the Kalibr type missiles. Vepr rejoined the Northern Fleet in March 2020. It is expected to remain in service for another 25–30 years. In July 2022, the submarine was monitored on the surface in Danish waters of the Baltic Sea by NATO naval forces as she transited from the Northern Fleet to the Baltic in company with the Yasen-class submarine Severodvinsk. The submarine was encountered days later near German waters by a garbagve collecting ship of the environmentalist One Earth – One Ocean organisation.
