= Akula-class submarine =

Russian class of nuclear attack submarines

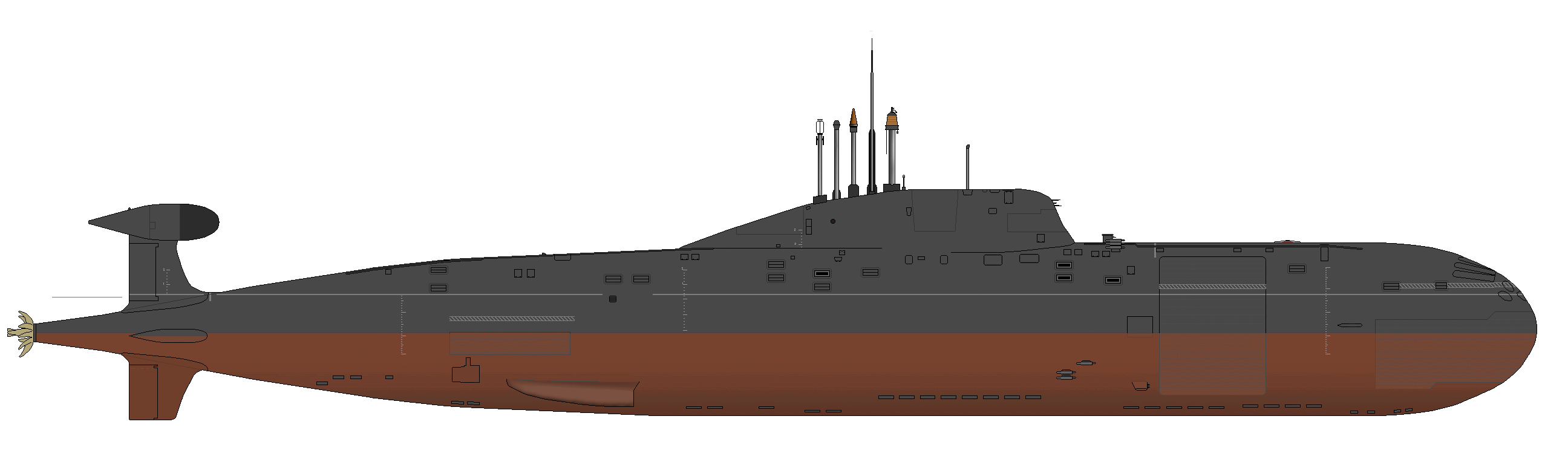
- Akula-class SSN profile

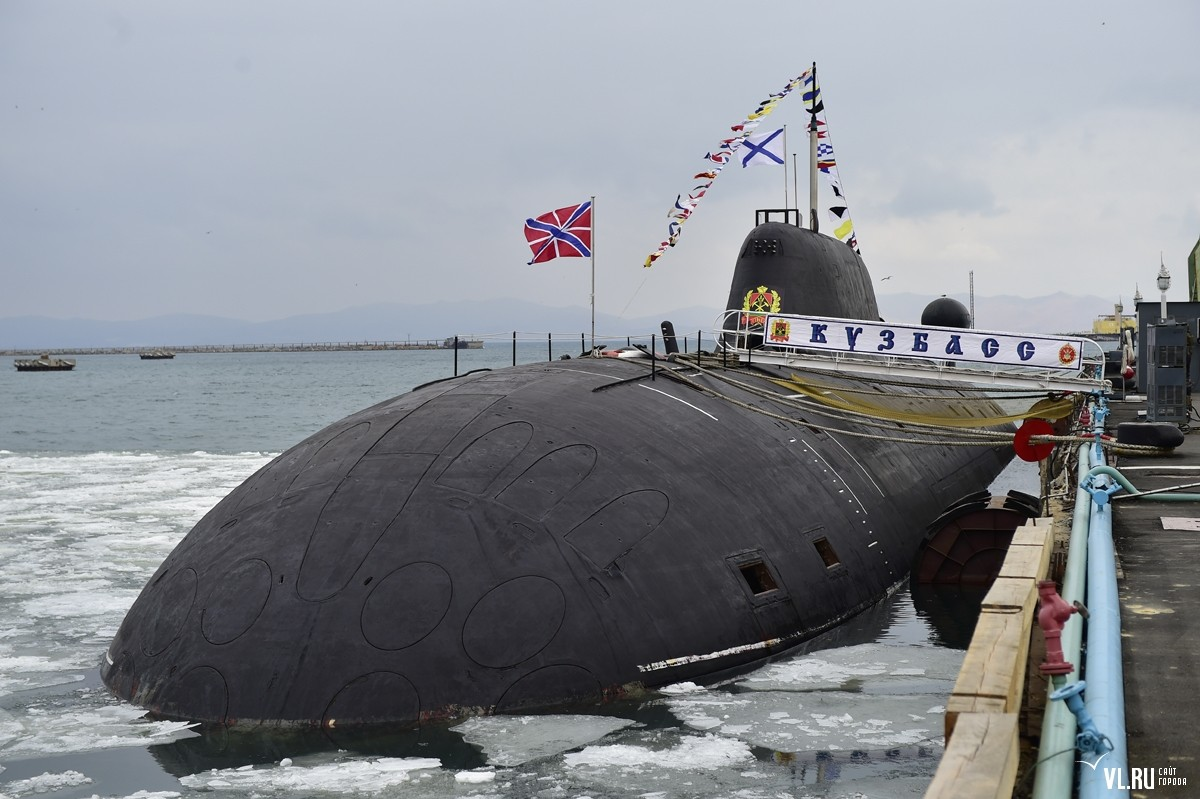

Class overview
- Name: Akula class
- Builders: Komsomolsk-on-Amur; Severodvinsk
- Operators: Soviet Navy; Russian Navy; Indian Navy
- Preceded by: Victor class, Sierra class
- Succeeded by: Yasen class
- Cost: est. $1.55 billion (1995 dollars)
- Built: 1983–1999
- In commission: 1984–present
- Planned: 20
- Completed: 15
- Canceled: 4 (1 Iribis suspended 42% complete since 1996)
- Active: 4 (4 active +6 on modernization in Russia)
- Retired: 5 in total.

General characteristics
- Type: Nuclear attack submarine
- Displacement: surfaced: 8,140 tons Akula I and Akula I Improved; 8,450–8,470 tons Akula II and III; submerged: 12,770 tons Akula I and Akula I Improved; 13,400–13,800 tons Akula II and III
- Length: 110.3 m (362 ft) for Akula I and Akula I Improved; 113.3 m (372 ft) for Akula II and Akula III
- Beam: 15.4 m (51 ft) for Akula I and Akula I Improved; 13.6 m (45 ft) for Akula II and Akula III
- Draught: 9.7 m (32 ft)
- Propulsion: one 190 MW OK-650B/OK-650M pressurized water nuclear reactor (HEU <= 45%); 1 OK-7 steam turbine 43,000 hp (32 MW); 2 OK-2 Turbo generators producing 2 MW; 1 seven-bladed propeller; 2 OK-300 retractable electric propulsors for low-speed and quiet maneuvering at 5 knots (9.3 km/h; 5.8 mph)
- Speed: 10 knots (19 km/h; 12 mph) surfaced; 28–35 knots (52–65 km/h; 32–40 mph) submerged
- Endurance: 100 days
- Test depth: 480 m (1,570 ft) test depth for Akula I and Akula I Improved; 520 m (1,710 ft) for Akula II and III; 600 m (2,000 ft) maximum operating depth
- Complement: 73 for Akula I & Improved, 62 (31 officers) for Akula II & III
- Sensors & processing systems: MGK-540 active/passive suite; Flank arrays; Pelamida towed array sonar; MG-70 mine detection sonar
- Electronic warfare & decoys: Bukhta ESM/ECM; MG-74 Korund noise simulation decoys (fired from external tubes); MT-70 Sonar intercept receiver; Nikhrom-M IFF
- Armament: 4 × 533 mm torpedo tubes (28 torpedoes) and 4 × 650 mm torpedo tubes (12 torpedoes). (K-152 Nerpa has 8 × 533 mm torpedo tubes) 40 torpedoes total; 1–3 × Igla-M surface-to-air missile launcher fired from sail (surface use only); Granat cruise missiles, now Kalibr
- Notes: Chiblis Surface Search radar; Medvyeditsa-945 Navigation system; Molniya-M Satellite communications; MGK-80 Underwater communications; Tsunami, Kiparis, Anis, Sintez and Kora Communications antennas; Paravan Towed VLF Antenna; Vspletsk Combat direction system

The Akula class, Soviet designation Project 971 Shchuka-B (Russian: Щука-Б, lit. 'Pike-B', NATO reporting name Akula) is a series of fourth generation nuclear-powered attack submarines (SSNs) first deployed by the Soviet Navy in 1986. There are four sub-classes or flights of Shchuka-B, consisting of the original seven Project 971 boats (codenamed Akula I), commissioned between 1984 and 1990; six Project 971Is (Improved Akulas), commissioned between 1991 and 2009; one Project 971U (Akula II), commissioned in 1995; and one Project 971M (Akula III), commissioned in 2001. The Russians call all of the submarines Shchuka-B, regardless of modifications.

Some confusion may exist as the name Akula (Russian: Акула, meaning 'shark' in Russian) was used by the Soviets for a different class of submarines, the Project 941, which is known in the West as the Typhoon class. The Project 971 was named Shchuka-B by the Soviets but given the designation Akula by the West after the name of the lead ship, K-284.

According to defense analyst Norman Polmar, the launch of the first submarine in 1985, "shook everyone [in the West] up", as Western intelligence agencies had not expected the Soviet Union to produce such a boat for another ten years.

== Design ==
Descriptions of the Akula-class SSN

The Akula incorporates a double hull system composed of an inner pressure hull and an outer "light" hull. This allows more freedom in the design of the exterior hull shape, resulting in a submarine with more reserve buoyancy than its western analogs.

The distinctive "bulb" or "can" located on top of the Akula's rudder houses its towed sonar array when retracted. Most Akulas have the wake detection system (Russian: Система обнаружения кильватерного следа) (SOKS) hydrodynamic sensors, which detect changes in temperature and salinity. They are located on the leading edge of the sail, on the outer hull casing in front of the sail and on the bottom of the hull forward of the sail.

Akulas (excluding Nerpa) are armed with four 533 mm torpedo tubes which can use Type 53 torpedoes or the RPK-2, RPK-6 missile, and four 650 mm torpedo tubes which can use Type 65 torpedoes or the RPK-7 missile. These torpedo tubes are arranged in two rows of four tubes each. The external tubes are mounted outside the pressure hull in one row, above the torpedo tubes, and can only be reloaded in port or with the assistance of a submarine tender. The 650 mm tubes can be fitted with liners to use the 533 mm weaponry. The submarine is also able to use its torpedo tubes to deploy naval mines.

== Versions ==
=== Project 971 (Akula I) ===
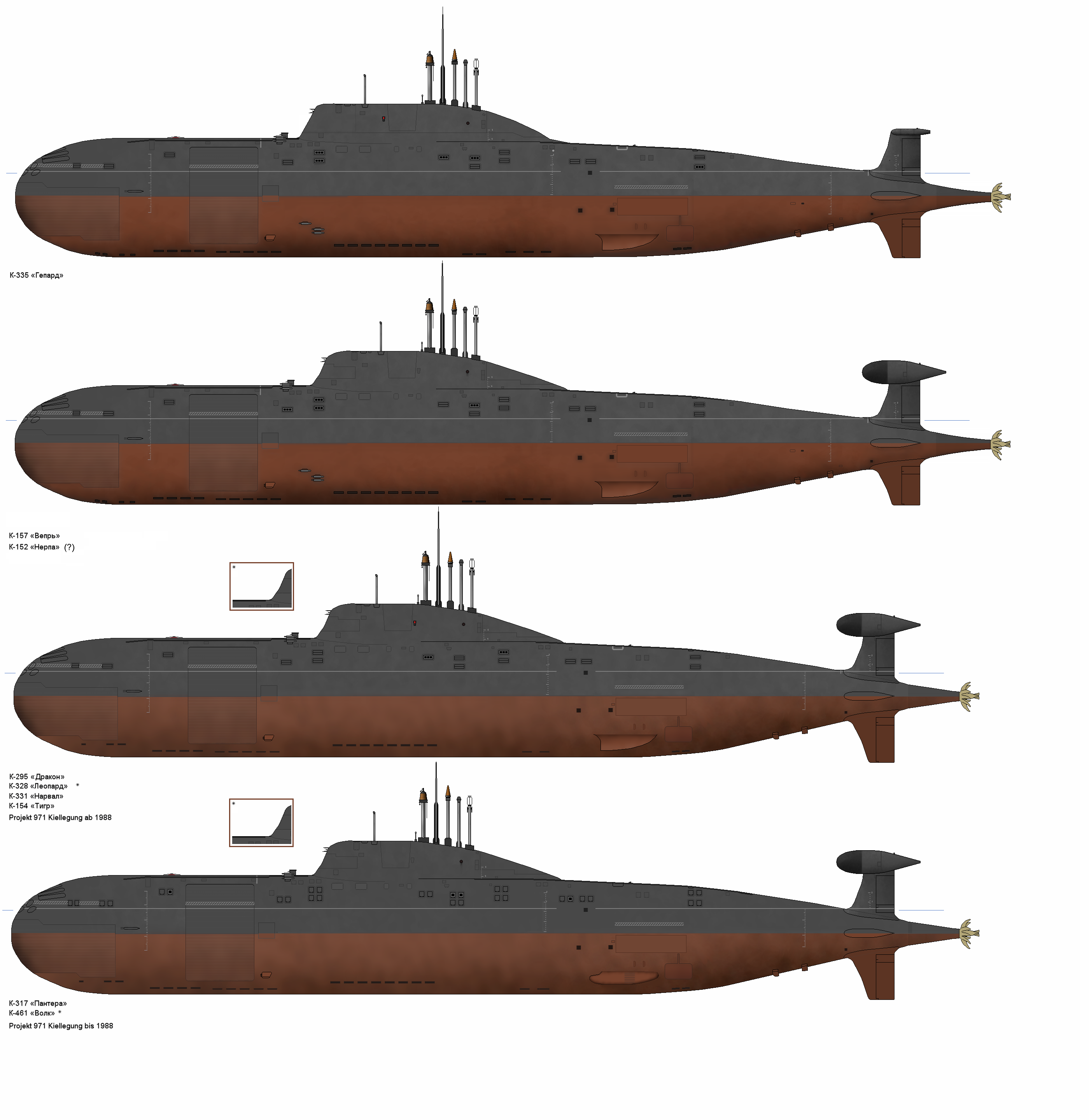
The four known versions of the Akula class

Of the seven original Akulas, only three are known to still be in service. These boats are equipped with MGK-540 Skat-3 sonar system (NATO reporting name Shark Gill). The lead boat of the class, K-284 Akula, was decommissioned in 2001, apparently to help save money in the cash-strapped Russian Navy. K-322 Kashalot and K-480 Bars [currently Ak Bars] are in reserve. K-480 Bars was put into reserve in 1998, and was being dismantled in February 2010. Pantera returned to service in January 2008 after a comprehensive overhaul. All were retrofitted with the SOKS hydrodynamic sensors. All submarines before K-391 Bratsk have reactor coolant scoops that are similar to the ones of the Typhoon class SSBNs, long and tubular. Bratsk and subsequent submarines have reactor coolant scoops similar to the short ones on the Oscar IIs (the Typhoon, Akula and Oscar classes use the similar OK-650 reactor).

=== Project 971 and 971I (Improved Akula I) ===
The six Akulas of this class are all thought to be in service. They are quieter than the original Akulas. Sources also disagree as to whether construction of this class has been suspended, or if there are a further two units planned.

Improved Akula I Hulls: K-328 Leopard, K-461 Volk, K-154 Tigr, K-419 Kuzbass, K-295 Samara and K-152 Nerpa. These submarines are much quieter than early Akula-class submarines and all have the SOKS hydrodynamic sensors except Leopard.

=== Project 971U (Akula II) ===
K-157 Vepr is the only completed Akula II (see the table below). The Akula II is 3 metres (9.8 ft) longer and displaces about 700 tons (submerged displacement) more than the Akula I. The added space was used for additional quieting measures. K-157 Vepr became the first Russian submarine that was quieter than the latest U.S. attack submarines of that time, which was the improved Los Angeles class (SSN 751 and later). Two of these submarines were used to build the Borei-class SSBNs.

=== Project 971M (Akula III) ===
The K-335 Gepard is the 14th submarine of the class and the only completed Akula III (see the table below) built for the Russian Navy. It was the first submarine commissioned in the Russian Navy since the Kursk disaster, as a result, its commissioning ceremony was an important morale boost for the Russian Navy with President Vladimir Putin in attendance. There is no NATO classification for the Akula III. It is longer and has a larger displacement compared to the Akula II, also it has an enlarged sail and a different towed-array dispenser on the vertical fin. Again, more noise reduction methods were employed. The Gepard was the most advanced Russian submarine before the submarines of the Severodvinsk and Borei class were commissioned.

The Soviet advances in sound quieting were of considerable concern to the West, for acoustics was long considered the most significant advantage in U.S. submarine technology compared to the Soviets.

In 1983–1984 the Japanese firm Toshiba sold sophisticated, nine axis milling equipment to the Soviets along with the computer control systems, which were developed by Norwegian firm Kongsberg Vaapenfabrik. U.S. Navy officials and Congressmen announced that this technology enabled the Soviet submarine builders to produce more accurate and quieter propellers. This is known as the Toshiba–Kongsberg scandal.

Due to the breakup of the Soviet Union in 1991, production of all Akulas slowed.

The 1999–2000 edition of Jane's Fighting Ships incorrectly listed the first Akula III as Viper (the actual name is "Vepr", "wild boar" in Russian), commissioned on 25 November 1995. Gepard (Cheetah), was launched in 1999 and was commissioned 5 December 2001.

== Operational history ==
=== Soviet and Russian Service ===
Between December 1995 and February 1996, submarine Volk was deployed to the Mediterranean along the Russian aircraft carrier Admiral Kuznetsov, where she monitored activities of several NATO submarines under Captain 1st rank S. V. Spravtsev.

Between April and June 1996, Tigr was deployed in the Atlantic, where she detected a U.S. Ohio class SSBN and tracked it on its combat patrol. On 23 July 1996, its commander, Captain 1st rank Alexey Burilichev, received a Hero of the Russian Federation award.

In August 2009, the news media reported that two Akula-class submarines operated off the East Coast of the United States, with one of the submarines being identified as a Project 971 Shchuka-B type. U.S. military sources noted that this was the first known Russian submarine deployment to the western Atlantic since the end of the Cold War, raising concerns within U.S. military and intelligence communities. U.S. Northern Command confirmed that this 2009 Akula-class submarine deployment did occur. One of the boats was likely Gepard that finished a relatively lengthy combat patrol between June and September that year under the command of the Captain 1st rank Alexey Vyacheslavovich Dmitrov, who on 15 February 2012 was awarded a title Hero of the Russian Federation for courage shown at work. The other submarine could have been Tigr under the command of Captain E. A. Petrov, given that she performed a combat patrol sometime between March and November 2009. It is unlikely that other submarines of the project 971 could have been present in the Atlantic that year. Pantera was in Severemorsk during summer, while Vepr, Leopard and Volk did not report any kind of activity in that year (1-3 submarines of the project are usually active with the Northern Fleet at any given moment).

In August 2012, the news media reported that another Akula-class submarine operated in the Gulf of Mexico purportedly undetected for over a month, sparking controversy within U.S. military and political circles, with U.S. Senator John Cornyn of the Senate Armed Services Committee demanding details of this deployment from Admiral Jonathan W. Greenert, the Chief of Naval Operations. Most likely, this was Tigr, as its commander Captain 1st rank Pavel Bulgakov received the Order of Courage on the Defender of the Fatherland Day on 22 February 2013.

=== Indian Service ===
India leased the K-152 Nerpa (Commissioned into the Indian Navy as INS Chakra) in 2009 and she has been deployed on multiple voyages. In 2019, after the Balakot Airstrikes carried out by the Indian Airforce on terrorist camps, the Chakra and the Scorpene class submarine INS Kalvari were deployed to hunt the Agosta class submarine PNS Saad after she was put to sea.

== Units ==
#	Name	Project	Builders	Laid down	Launched	Commissioned	Fleet	Status
K-284	Akula	971	Amur Shipyard	11 November 1983	27 June 1984	30 December 1984	Pacific Fleet	Decommissioned in 2001.
K-480	Ak Bars	971	Sevmash	22 February 1985	16 April 1988	29 December 1988	Northern Fleet	Decommissioned in 2002, scrapping began in 2010 but the hull section was used in the construction of ballistic missile submarine Vladimir Monomakh.
K-263	Barnaul	971	Amur Shipyard	9 May 1985	28 May 1986	30 December 1987	Pacific Fleet	Decommissioned in 2011
K-322	Kashalot	971	Amur Shipyard	5 September 1986	18 July 1987	30 December 1988	Pacific Fleet	Decommissioned on 9 October 2019.
K-317	Pantera	971	Sevmash	6 November 1986	21 May 1990	27 December 1990	Northern Fleet	Active, overhaul and modernization completed in 2007.
K-461	Volk	971	Sevmash	14 November 1987	11 June 1991	29 December 1991	Northern Fleet	Overhaul and modernization to finish in 2028.
K-391	Bratsk	971	Amur Shipyard	23 February 1988	14 April 1989	29 December 1989	Pacific Fleet	Decommissioned 2022, awaiting scrapping.
K-328	Leopard	971	Sevmash	26 October 1988	28 June 1992	30 December 1992	Northern Fleet	On sea trials as of 2026 following refit and upgrade
K-154	Tigr	971	Sevmash	10 September 1989	26 June 1993	29 December 1993	Northern Fleet	Overhaul to finish in 2022.
K-331	Magadan	971	Amur Shipyard	28 December 1989	23 June 1990	23 December 1990	Pacific Fleet	In overhaul from July 2019 to 2022.
K-157	Vepr	971U	Sevmash	13 July 1990	10 December 1994	25 November 1995	Northern Fleet	Active, overhaul and modernization completed in 2020.
K-xxx		971M	Amur Shipyard	1990				Not completed.
K-419	Kuzbass	971	Amur Shipyard	28 July 1991	18 May 1992	31 December 1992	Pacific Fleet	Active, overhaul and modernization completed in 2015.
K-335	Gepard	971M	Sevmash	23 September 1991	17 September 1999	5 December 2001	Northern Fleet	Active, overhaul and modernization completed in 2015.
K-xxx		971M	Amur Shipyard	1991				Not completed.
K-337	Kuguar	971U	Sevmash	18 August 1992				Not completed, the hull section was used in the construction of the Yury Dolgorukiy SSBN.
K-333	Rys	971U	Sevmash	31 August 1993				Not completed, the hull section was used in the construction of the Alexander Nevsky SSBN.
K-295	Samara	971	Amur Shipyard	7 November 1993	5 August 1994	17 July 1995	Pacific Fleet	Modernization to finish in 2023.
K-152	Nerpa (ex-Chakra)	971I	Amur Shipyard	1993	26 July 2006	28 December 2009		Active, has been leased to India from 2012 until 2022, returned already in 2021. Proposed to decommission in 2023.
K-519	Iribis	971I	Amur Shipyard	1994				Construction halted at 42% in 1996, may be completed and leased to India.

== Nerpa 2008 accident ==
On 27 October 2008, it was reported that K-152 Nerpa of the Russian Pacific Fleet had begun her sea trials in the Sea of Japan before handover under a lease agreement to the Indian Navy. On 8 November 2008, while conducting one of these trials, an accidental activation of the halon-based fire-extinguishing system took place in the fore section of the vessel. Within seconds the halon gas had displaced all breathable air from the compartment. As a result, 20 people (17 civilians and 3 seamen) were killed by asphyxiation. Dozens of others suffered freon-related injuries and were evacuated to an unknown port in Primorsky Krai. This was the worst accident in the Russian navy since the loss of the submarine K-141 Kursk in 2000. The submarine itself did not sustain any serious damage and there was no release of radiation.

== Lease to India ==
=== Chakra II ===
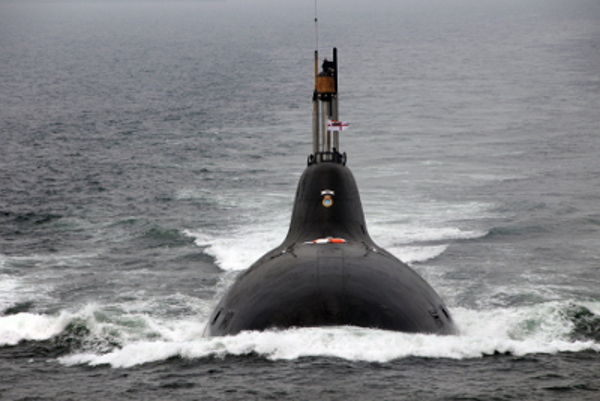
Chakra in the open sea, flying the Indian Naval Ensign

Three hundred Indian Navy personnel were trained in Russia for the operation of the Akula II submarine Nerpa. India has finalised a deal with Russia, in which at the end of the lease of these submarines, it has an option to buy them. The submarine is named INS Chakra as was the previous India-leased Soviet Charlie-I SSGN. Chakra was officially commissioned into the Indian Navy on 4 April 2012.

Whereas the Russian Navy's Akula-II could be equipped with 28 nuclear-capable cruise missiles with a striking range of 3,000 km (1,620 nmi; 1,864 mi), the Indian version is reportedly armed with the 300 km (162 nmi; 186 mi)-range Club-S nuclear-capable missiles. Missiles with ranges greater than 300 km (162 nmi; 186 mi) cannot be exported due to arms control restrictions, since Russia is a signatory to the MTCR treaty.

In June 2021, Nerpa was reported in Singapore with Indian crew aboard and on its way back to Russia, despite one year remaining of the 10-year lease, commenced in April 2012. The stated reason was problems with maintenance of the nuclear reactors. Accordingly, the lease will not be prolonged after 2022, as was initially expected.

=== Chakra III ===
Russia said in December 2014 that it is ready to lease India more nuclear-powered submarines a day after President Vladimir Putin and Prime Minister Narendra Modi pledged to deepen defence ties.

In January 2015, it was reported that India was involved in negotiations involving the leasing of the Kashalot and the Iribis.

On 7 March 2019, India and Russia signed a $3 billion deal for lease of another Akula-class nuclear-powered attack submarine. The submarine, dubbed as Chakra III, should be delivered to the Indian Navy by 2025.

As of November 2024, the deal was delayed until at least 2028 according to multiple sources.

== Gallery ==
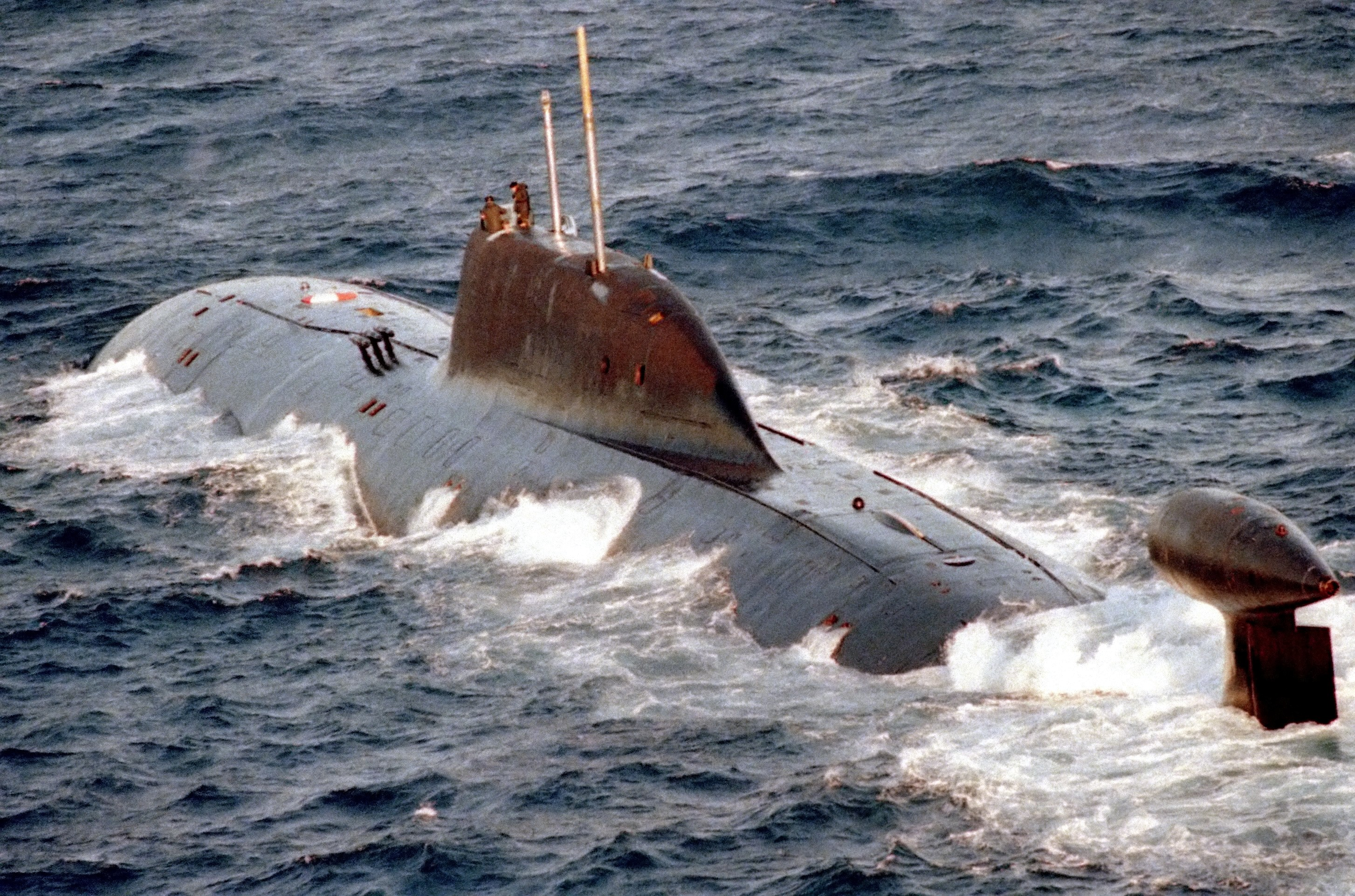
Submarine K-322 Kashalot

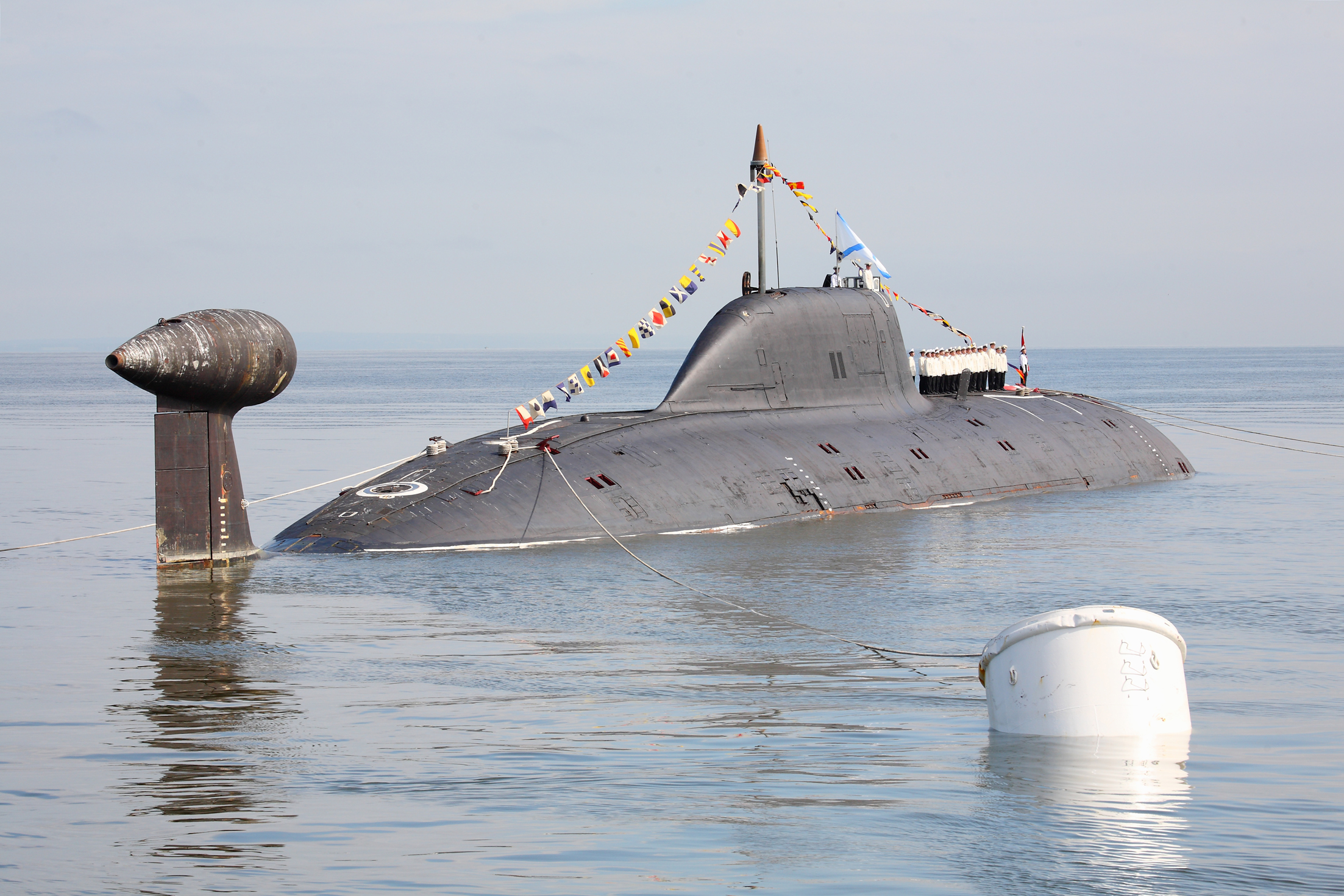
An Akula-class submarine during the Russian Navy Day in 2009

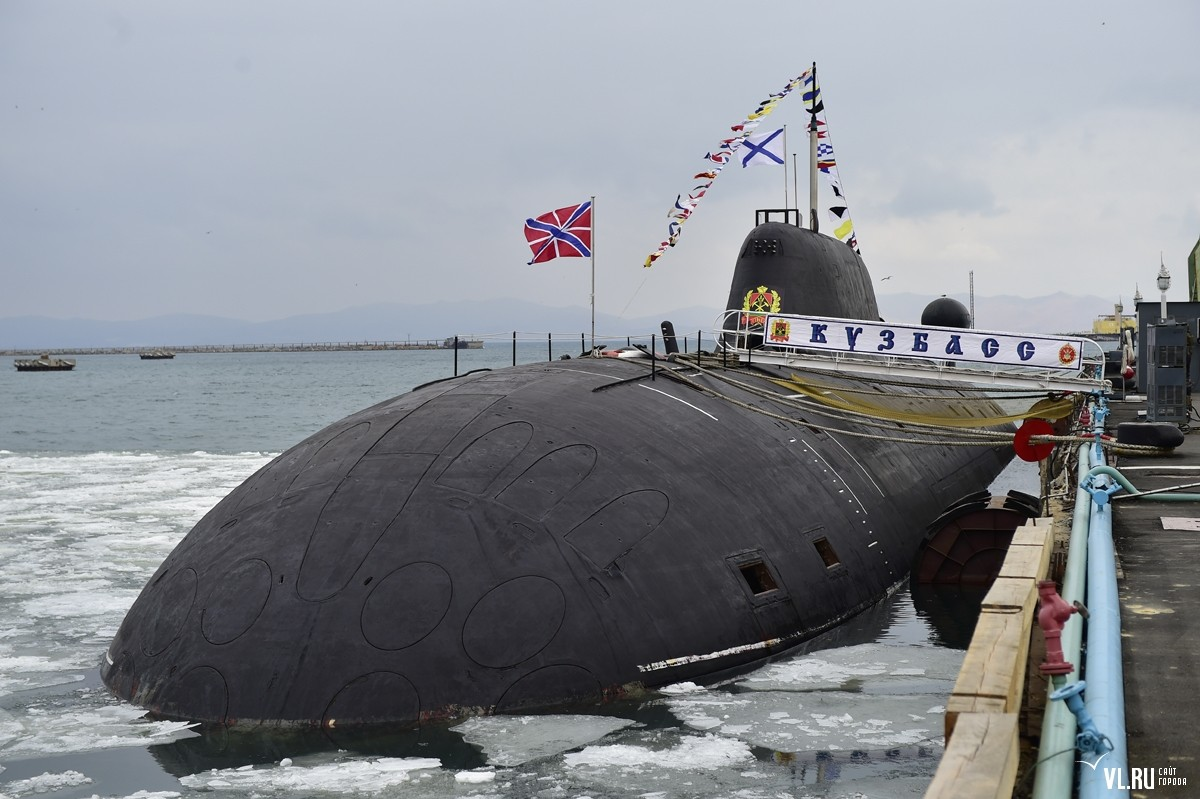
Submarine K-419 Kuzbass

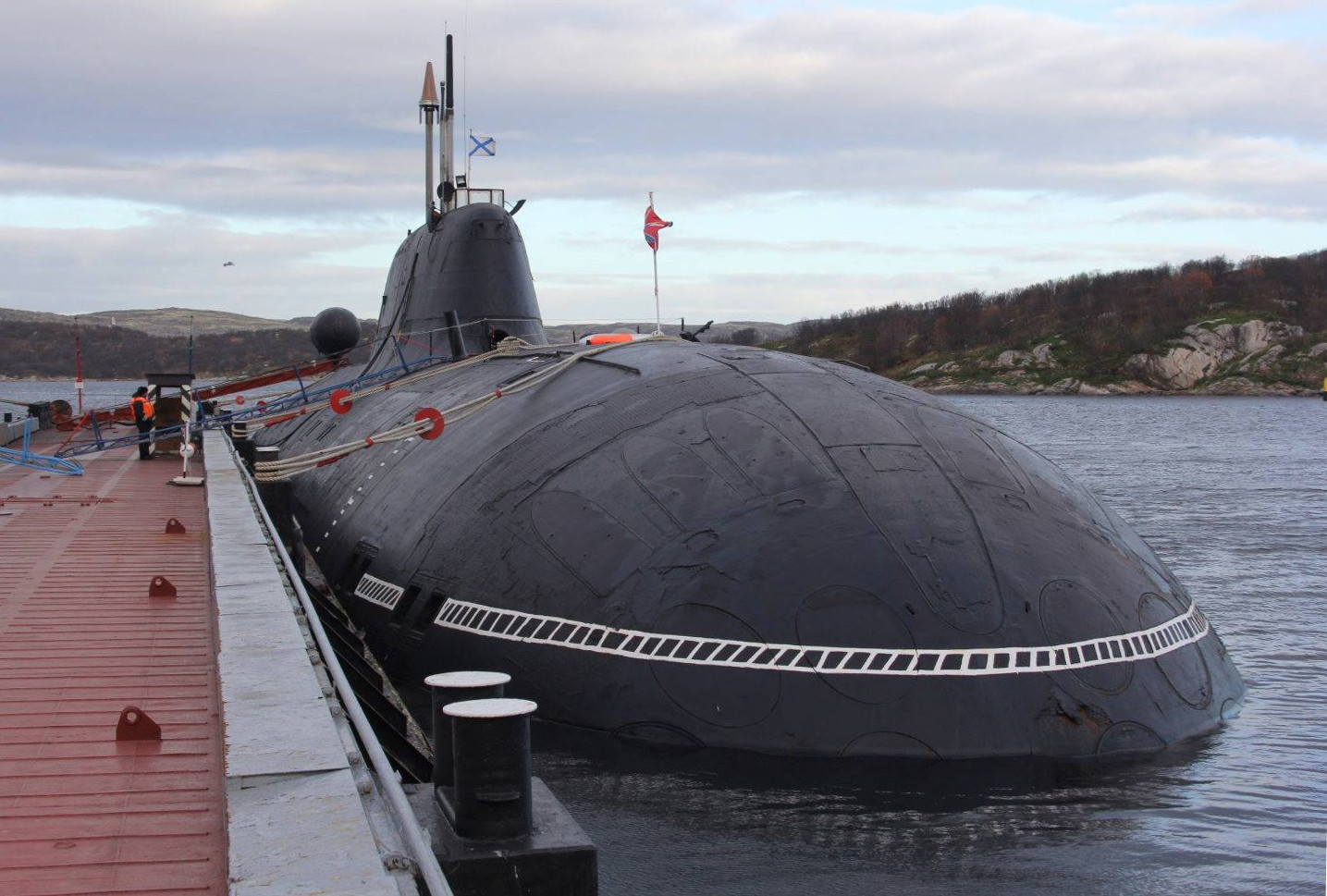
Submarine K-317 Pantera

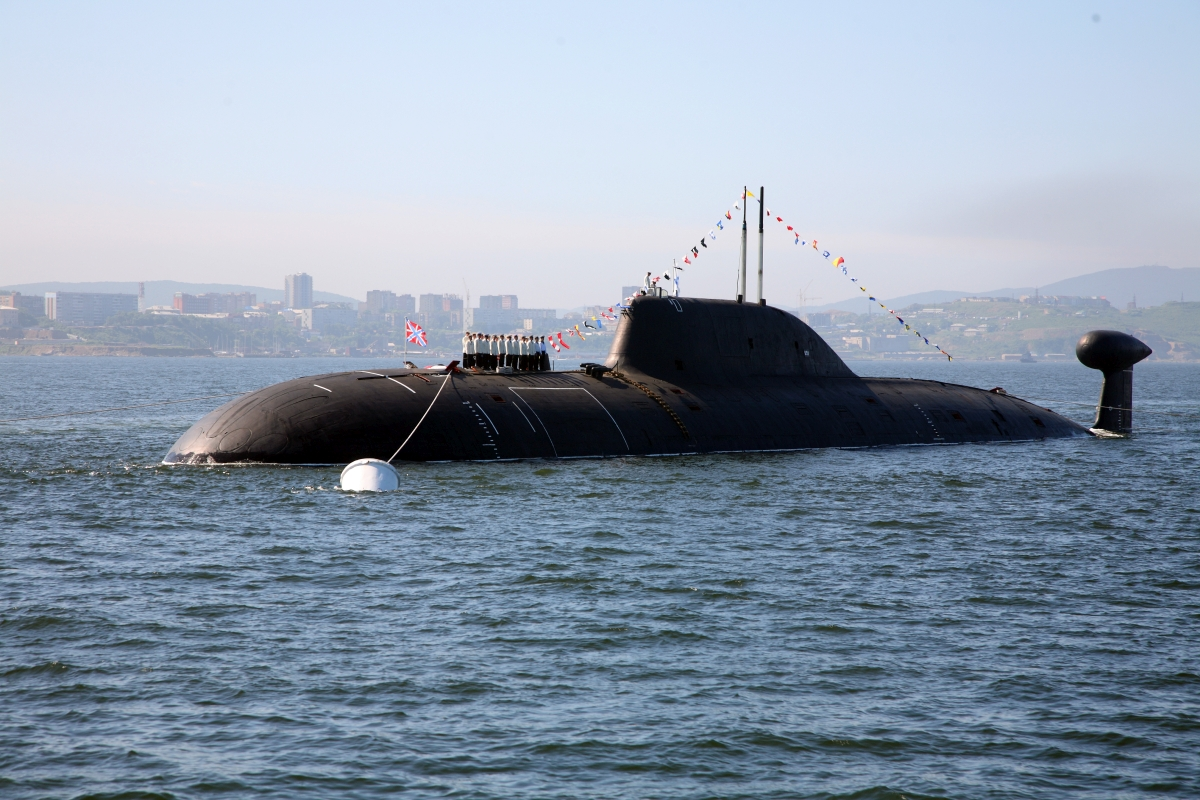
K-419 Kuzbass at the 2008 Navy Day

== See also ==
- List of Soviet and Russian submarine classes
- List of submarine classes in service
- Future of the Russian Navy
- Cruise missile submarine
