= Gadzhiyevo =

Town in Murmansk Oblast, Russia

Gadzhiyevo Гаджиево
- Town
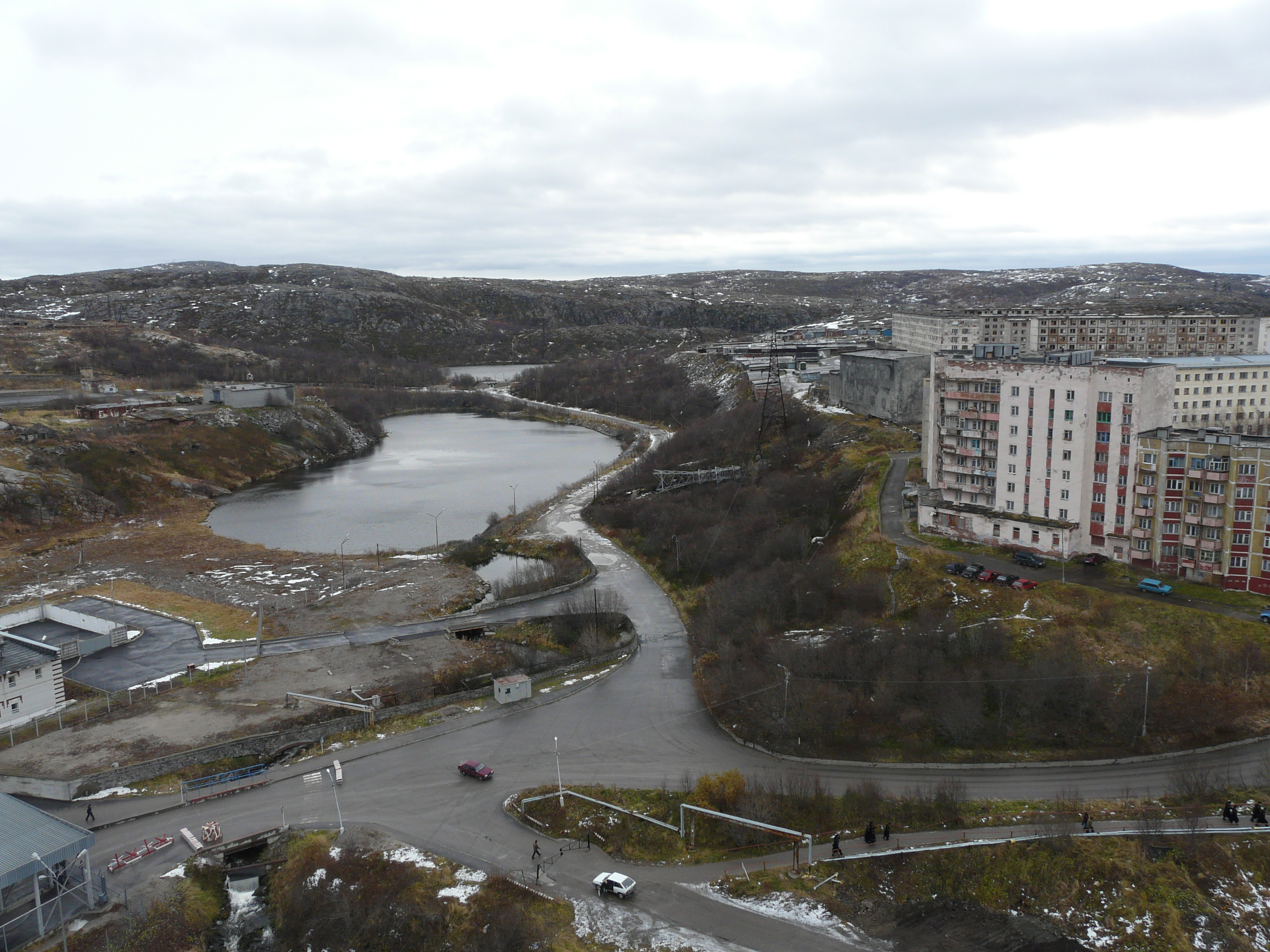
- Lake in Gadzhiyevo

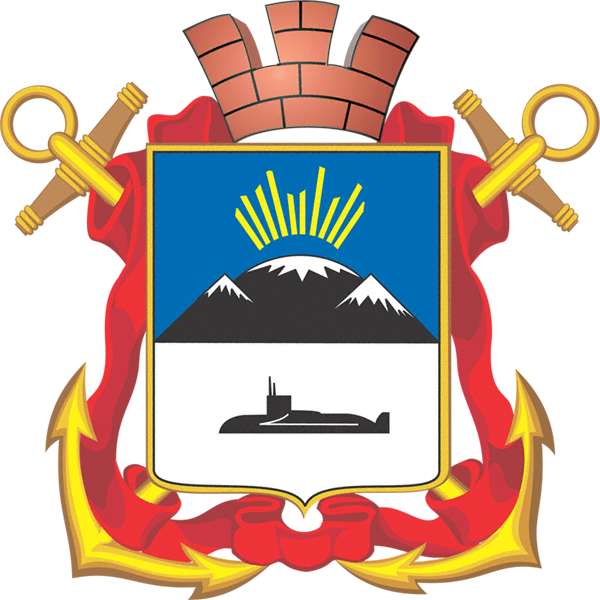
- Coat of arms
- Interactive map of Gadzhiyevo
- Location of Gadzhiyevo Gadzhiyevo (Murmansk Oblast)
- Coordinates: 69°15′1″N 33°18′54″E
- Country: Russia
- Federal subject: Murmansk Oblast
- First mentioned: 1957
- Town status since: 1981
- Elevation: 30 m (98 ft)

Population (2010 Census)
  - Total: 11,068
  - Estimate (2023): 9,088 (−17.9%)

Municipal status
  - Urban okrug: Alexandrovsk Urban Okrug
- Time zone: UTC+3 (MSK)
- Postal codes: 184670, 184671
- Dialing code: +7 81539
- OKTMO ID: 47737000005

Gadzhiyevo (Russian: Гаджи́ево) is a town under the administrative jurisdiction of the closed administrative-territorial formation of Alexandrovsk in Murmansk Oblast, Russia. Population: 11,068 (2010 census); 12,180 (2002 census).

It was previously known as Yagelnaya Guba (until 1967), Gadzhiyevo (until 1981), Murmansk-130 (until 1994), Skalisty (until 1999).

== History ==
First mentioned in 1957, it was known as Yagelnaya Guba (Я́гельная Губа́) until 1967 and as Skalisty (Скали́стый) from 1981 to 1994, although it was often referred to as Murmansk-130 (Му́рманск-130). The name Skalisty was made official in 1994, but in 1999 the town was renamed back to Gadzhiyevo—the name it previously bore from 1967 to 1981. The current name is in honor of Magomet Gadzhiyev, a distinguished World War II submarine Commanding Officer.

Gadzhiyevo was granted town status (as Skalisty) in 1981.

== Administrative and municipal status ==
Within the framework of administrative divisions, Gadzhiyevo is subordinated to the closed administrative-territorial formation of Alexandrovsk—an administrative unit with the status equal to that of the districts. Within the framework of municipal divisions, the town of Gadzhiyevo is a part of Alexandrovsk Urban Okrug.
