= Russian submarine Akula (K-284) =

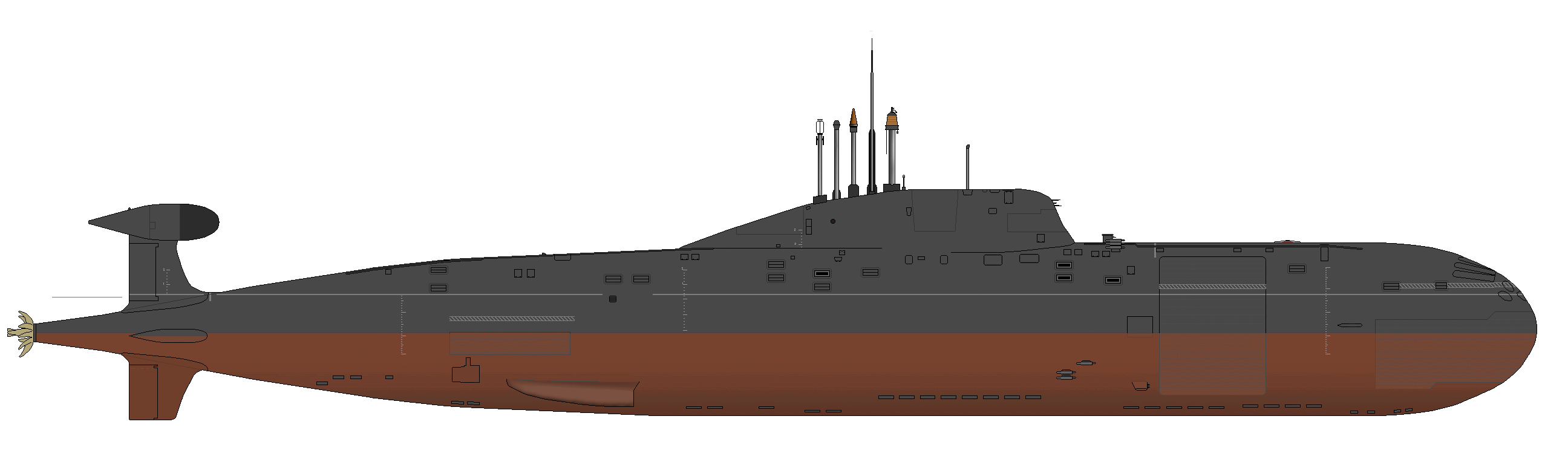

History

Russia
- Name: Akula
- Namesake: Russian word for shark
- Builder: Amur Shipbuilding Plant
- Laid down: 6 November 1983
- Launched: 16 June 1984
- Commissioned: 30 December 1984
- Decommissioned: 2001

General characteristics
- Class & type: Project 971U Schuka-B ("Akula-II") nuclear attack submarine
- Displacement: 8,140 t (8,010 long tons) surfaced; 12,770 t (12,570 long tons) submerged
- Length: 114.3 m (375 ft 0 in)
- Beam: 13.6 m (44 ft 7 in)
- Draught: 9.7 m (31 ft 10 in)
- Propulsion: 1 × 190 MWt OK-650 V reactor (HEU = 45%)
- Speed: 24 knots (44 km/h; 28 mph)
- Complement: 73 officers and ratings

K-284 Akula was the lead ship of the Soviet Navy's Project 971U "Shchuka-B" (NATO reporting name "Akula") nuclear-powered attack submarines. The ship was laid down on 6 November 1983 and was commissioned in the Pacific Fleet on 30 December 1984. The submarine was 12-15 dB quieter than the previous generation of Soviet submarines. K-284 served in the Soviet fleet until the collapse of the Soviet Union in 1991 and then continued to serve in the Russian Navy. The submarine was decommissioned in 2001.
