= Propulsor =

Mechanical device to propel a vessel

A propulsor is a mechanical device that gives propulsion. The word is commonly used in the marine vernacular, and implies a mechanical assembly that is more complicated than a propeller. The Kort nozzle, pump-jet and rim-driven thruster are examples.

An example propulsor is shown in the accompanying picture. It has a shroud which cuts down on blade-tip cavitation and radiated noise. It also has a rotor element and a stator. The stator concentrates the thrust in axial direction and reduces energy wasted in the tangential flow (therefore eliminating torque on the hull). The number of blades in the rotor and stator will typically be two different prime numbers to avoid standing waves. The blades in the rotor or the stator may be angled to further reduce noise. The physical design and layout is very much similar to a single-stage axial-flow compressor.

== Other propulsors ==
=== Voith Schneider ===
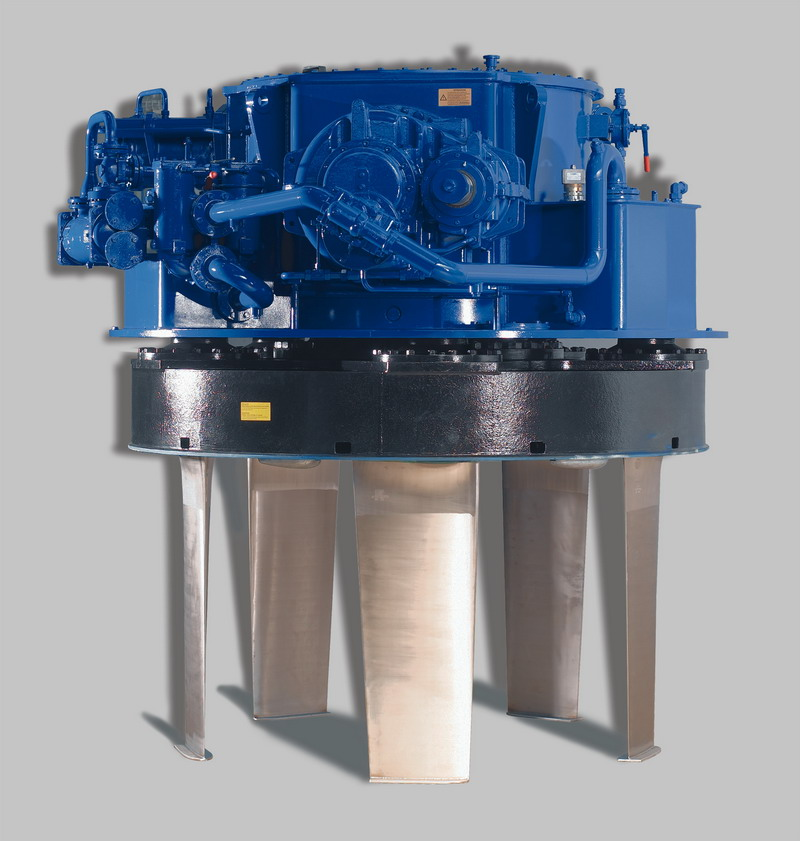
Voith‐Schneider propeller

The Voith Schneider Propeller, also known as a cycloidal drive, is a specialized marine propulsion system. It is highly maneuverable, being able to change the direction of its thrust almost instantaneously. It is widely used on tugs and ferries.

From a circular plate, rotating around a vertical axis, a circular array of vertical blades (in the shape of hydrofoils) protrude out of the bottom of the ship. Each blade can rotate itself around a vertical axis. The internal gear changes the angle of attack of the blades in sync with the rotation of the plate, so that each blade can provide thrust in any direction, very similar to the collective pitch control and cyclic in a helicopter.

=== Azimuth thruster ===
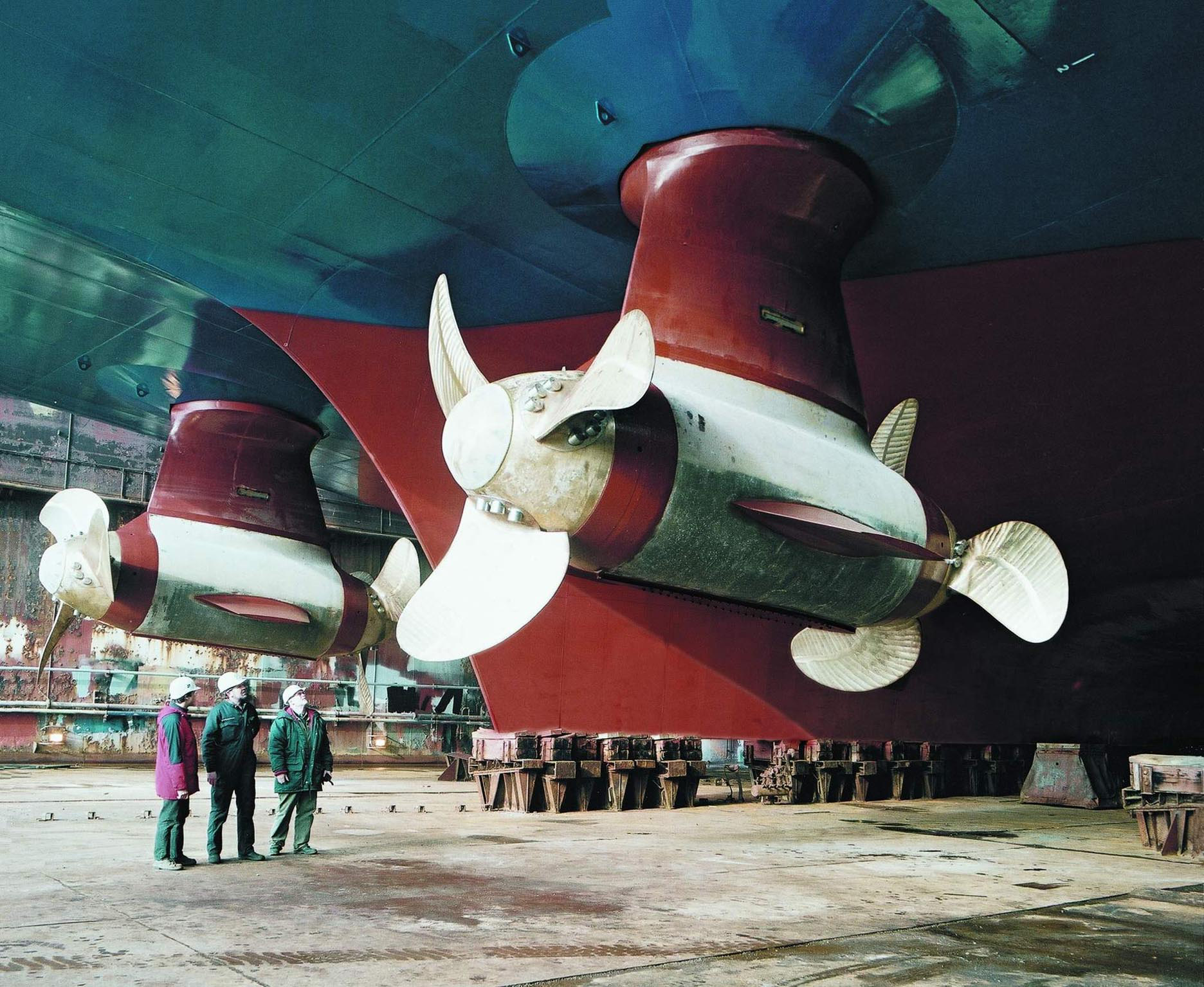
Siemens Schottel azimuth thrusters

An azimuth thruster is a configuration of ship propellers placed in pods that can be rotated on the horizontal plane, making a rudder unnecessary. These give ships better maneuverability than a fixed propeller and rudder system.

=== Magnetohydrodynamic drive ===
A magnetohydrodynamic drive or MHD propulsor is a method for propelling seagoing vessels using only electric and magnetic fields with no moving parts, using magnetohydrodynamics. The working principle involves electrification of the propellant (gas or water) which can then be directed by a magnetic field, pushing the vehicle in the opposite direction. Although some working prototypes exist, MHD drives remain impractical and exist mostly in the world of science fiction. A magnetohydrodynamic drive was featured in the 1990 film The Hunt for Red October, differing from the pump jet propulsion system featured in the Tom Clancy novel The Hunt for Red October upon which the movie was based.

== See also ==
- Z-drive
- L-drive
- Voith-Schneider
- Axial fan design
- Axial-flow compressor
