= OK-650 reactor =

Nuclear fission reactor

The OK-650 reactor is the nuclear fission reactor used for powering the Soviet Navy's Project 685 Плавник/Plavnik (Mike), Project 971 Щука-Б/Shchuka-B (Akula), and the Project 945 Барракуда/Barrakuda, Кондор/Kondor, and Марс/Mars (Sierra) submarines, and in pairs to power the Project 941 Акула/Akula (Typhoon) and Project 949 Гранит/Granit and Антей/Antei (Oscar) third generation submarines. In the Russian Navy, the OK-650 powers the Borei-class SSBNs, and the fourth-generation Yasen-class attack/cruise missile submarines.

This pressurized water reactor (PWR) uses 20-45% enriched uranium-235 fuel to produce 190 MW of thermal power. Developed during the 1970s, these reactors were designed with the aim of minimizing accidents and malfunctions. Monitoring subsystems, designed for rapid detection of leaks, were included, along with newer-generation emergency cooling systems for the main reactor core. It was developed by OKBM Afrikantov.

== Versions ==
Version	Uranium enrichment (%)	Power (MW)	Vessel type (number of reactors)
OK-650 (OK-650A)	21-45	190 (180)	Sierra-class submarine (1)
OK-650B	21-45	190	Oscar-class submarine (2), Akula-class submarine (1)
OK-650B-3	21-45	190	K-278 Komsomolets (1)
OK-650VV	21-45	190	Typhoon-class submarine (2)
OK-650V	21-45	190	Oscar II-class submarine (2), Borei-class submarine (1) Yasen-class submarine (1)
OK-650KPM	21-45	200	Yasen-M class submarine (1)
