= Admiral Gorshkov-class frigate =

Stealth ships of the Russian navy

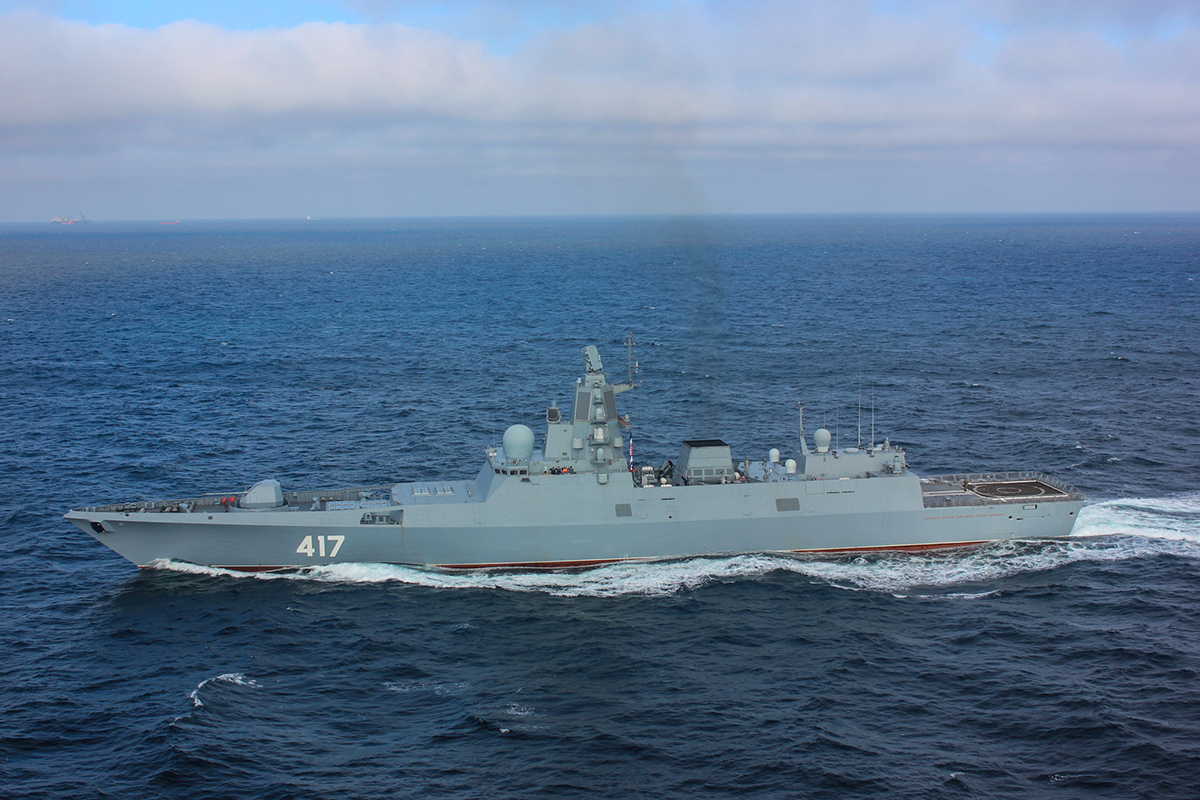
- Russian frigate Admiral Gorshkov port beam

Class overview
- Name: Project 22350
- Builders: Severnaya Verf, Saint Petersburg
- Operators: Russian Navy
- Preceded by: Neustrashimy class; Krivak class
- Subclasses: Project 22350M
- Cost: Approximately US$250 million per unit
- Built: 2006–present
- In commission: 2018–present
- Planned: 10
- Building: 6
- Completed: 3
- Active: 3

General characteristics
- Type: Guided missile frigate
- Displacement: Standard: 4,550 tons; Full: 5,400 tons
- Length: 135 m (442 ft 11 in)
- Beam: 16 m (52 ft 6 in)
- Draught: 4.5 m (14 ft 9 in)
- Propulsion: 2 shaft CODAG; 2 10D49 cruise diesel engines 5,200 shp (3,900 kW); 2 M90FR boost gas turbines 27,500 shp (20,500 kW); Total: 65,400 shp (48,800 kW)
- Speed: 29.5 knots (54.6 km/h; 33.9 mph)
- Range: 4,850 nmi (8,980 km; 5,580 mi) at 14 kn (26 km/h; 16 mph)
- Endurance: 30 days
- Complement: 210
- Sensors & processing systems: Air search radars: 5P-27 Furke-4 main radar for detection, tracking and targeting of air and surface targets, 5P-20K "Poliment" 4 faced active phased array search, tracking and guidance/management radar; Surface search radar: 34K1 "Monolit" surface search, AShM and auxiliary artillery targeting radar; Artillery Fire Control Radar: 5P-10 Puma; Sonar: Zarya-M sonar, Vinyetka towed array sonar; Navigation: 3 × Pal-N radars; Other: 2 × target illuminators aft superstructure for Palash CIWS; Communications: Vigstar Centaurus-NM; Electro-Optical Systems: 2 × MTK-201M and 2 × 5P-520; Combat system: Sigma-22350
- Electronic warfare & decoys: EW Suite: Prosvet-M; Countermeasures: 2 × PU KT-308; 8 × PU KT-216; 2 × 5P-42 Filin
- Armament: 3S-14 UKSK family Vertical launching system (VLS) cells for cruise missiles (anti-ship, land-attack and ASW) as follows: Project 22350: 16 (2 × 8) 3S-14 VLS for Kalibr, Oniks, Zircon anti-ship cruise missiles or Otvet anti-submarine missiles, (Admiral Gorshkov, Admiral Kasatonov, Admiral Golovko and Admiral Isakov); Upgraded Project 22350: 32 (4 × 8) 3S14M VLS for Kalibr, Oniks, Tsircon or Otvet anti-submarine missiles (Admiral Amelko, Admiral Chichagov, Admiral Yumashev and Admiral Spiridonov); 32 (4 × 8) Redut VLS based surface-to-air missile system (navalised S-350 missile system) for multiple types of S-350 family missiles: Long and medium-range SAM: 9M96, 9M96M, 9M96D/9M96DM(M2); Short-range SAM: Quad-packed (four missiles per cell) 9M100 surface-to-air missiles; 1 × 130 mm Amethyst/Arsenal A-192M naval gun; 2 × Palash CIWS each with twin Gryazev-Shipunov GSh-6-30 6 barrel 30 mm rotary cannons.; 2 × 4 330 mm torpedo tubes for Paket-NK anti-torpedo/anti-submarine torpedoes; 2 × 14.5 mm MTPU pedestal machine guns
- Aircraft carried: 1 × Ka-27 series helicopter including the Ka-27PL ASW helicopter
- Aviation facilities: Helipad and hangar for one helicopter

The Admiral Gorshkov class, also known as the Project 22350, is a class of frigates of the Russian Navy. The ships are being built by the Severnaya Verf in Saint Petersburg at a cost of $250 million per ship. The class was designed by the Severnoye Design Bureau and incorporates use of stealth technology. As of early 2026, ten vessels have been ordered, and are expected to be delivered by 2029. Three ships have been commissioned, with the following two being fitted out. The lead ship of the class, Admiral Gorshkov, was commissioned on 28 July 2018.

== History ==
The design of the ship, developed by Severnoye PKB (Northern Design Bureau) FSUE in Saint Petersburg, was approved by Naval Command in July 2003. The plan is to fully replace the older Neustrashimy and Krivak class in four Russian fleets.

The lead ship, Admiral Gorshkov or its full name – Admiral of the Fleet of the Soviet Union Gorshkov, was laid down on 1 February 2006 in Severnaya Verf shipyard in Saint Petersburg. In late October 2008 the Russian deputy prime minister, Sergei Ivanov, said the timely construction of combat ships is a priority task for Russia's shipbuilding industry, and announced that the first ship in the class would be ready by 2011. The completion date of the lead ship was initially slated for 2009, but this was later pushed back, as was the commissioning date.

On 24 June 2009, during the "МВМС-IMDS 2009" International Naval Expo, the Commander in Chief of the Russian Navy, Admiral Vladimir Vysotsky, announced that the production of a second Admiral Gorshkov-class frigate would begin at Severnaya Verf by the end of the year. In November 2009 the Severnaya Verf shipyard announced that it would start the construction of the second ship of the class on 26 November named Admiral Kasatonov. The ship was laid down in a ceremony attended by representatives of the Russian Navy, the Saint Petersburg administration, and Admiral Igor Kasatonov - the son of the ship's namesake, Vladimir Kasatonov. In December 2014, one engine from Admiral Kasatonov was transferred to Admiral Gorshkov.

The Russian Navy set a requirement for 20–30 such ships. In 2011, the Severnaya Verf shipyard announced having received orders for six units. According to the Russian Navy's deputy commander for armament Vice Admiral Viktor Bursuk, the Russian Navy needs no less than 15 such frigates in basic and upgraded versions.

The first frigate was floated out of the launch dock on 29 October 2010. The ship was only 40 percent complete and then began to be fitted out. At that point, main mechanical equipment and systems providing safe launching had been installed, including a combined diesel and gas (CODAG) turbine powerplant, gear assemblies, drive shafts and screws, and electric power supply facilities. Further work was performed at the shipyard's fitting quay.

In August 2012, the shipyard received loans worth RUB 16.23 billion (US$510 million) from the state-owned Sberbank to facilitate the frigate construction project.

The first two ships of the class have gas turbines from Zorya-Mashproekt in Ukraine. Following the annexation of Crimea by the Russian Federation, Ukrainian industry refused to supply Russia with military technology. As a result, NPO Saturn has been commissioned to design indigenous engines. Initial forecasts expected these new engines to be available in 2017–18, allowing ships to be commissioned from 2020; however, after intervention by the Russian government, the plan was brought forward. In November 2020 it was announced that United Engine Corporation had initiated delivery of the DGTA M55R diesel-gas power plant which would be installed on frigates of the class beginning with Admiral Isakov.

The first frigate in the class, Admiral Gorshkov, was commissioned on 28 July 2018.

State testing of the Russian shipborne Poliment-Redut 150 km (93 mi) range air defence missile system with a phased array radar for the frigates of 22350 series has been completed, Commander-in-Chief of the Russian Navy Admiral Vladimir Korolyov announced in February 2019. That month, Admiral Gorshkov and Admiral Kasatonov were equipped with a naval version of the new 5P-42 Filin electro-optic countermeasure system. The Filin fires a beam similar to a strobe light that affects enemy combatants' eyesight, making it more difficult for them to aim at night. During testing, volunteers reportedly used rifles and guns to shoot targets that were protected by the system and reported having trouble aiming because they could not see. Additionally, about half of the volunteers said they felt dizzy, nauseated and disoriented. About 20 percent of the volunteers reported experiencing hallucinations.

On 23 April 2019, two modified Project 22350 frigates, Admiral Amelko and Admiral Chichagov, were laid down at Severnaya Verf in Saint Petersburg during a ceremony attended by Russian president Vladimir Putin. It was reported that they were to be fitted with 24 VLS cells for Kalibr, Oniks or Zircon cruise missiles, as opposed to 16 VLS cells installed on the first four frigates of the class. Their delivery to the Russian Navy is scheduled for 2023/24 and 2025, respectively. In 2021 it was reported that the intent was actually to fit 32 3S-14 versatile shipborne VLS cells in Admiral Amelko, Admiral Chichagov and follow-on ships. This remained to be confirmed. In 2020 it was indicated that three ships would be assigned to the Northern Fleet, three to the Pacific Fleet and two to the Black Sea Fleet. A further contract for two additional frigates of the class was announced at the Army-2020 forum increasing the numbers of projected frigates in the Northern and Pacific Fleets to four vessels each.

On 30 December 2021, it was reported that the Amur Shipyard was preparing to sign a contract for the construction of six frigates for the Pacific Fleet, likely of the Admiral Gorshkov class. This would decrease the load on Severnaya Verf, which is currently responsible for the construction of all Admiral Gorshkov-class frigates. However, there has been no official confirmation from either the Ministry of Defence or Amur Shipyard.

On 30 December 2020 it was reported that the second ship of the class, Admiral Kasatonov, had successfully completed acceptance trials of the Otvet anti-submarine missile complex.

In November 2022, General Director of Severnaya Verf Igor Orlov stated that the shipyard planned to lay down five additional Admiral Gorshkov-class frigates.

On 11 December 2023 it was reported that Admiral Kasatonov was upgraded with Zircon hypersonic missiles.

As of early 2026, Severnaya Verf has been tasked with building all 10 of the frigates ordered by the Russian Navy (See § Ships).

=== Project 22350M frigate ===
In March 2019, the Severnoye Design Bureau reported it has completed the outline design of the upgraded Project 22350M frigate and began working on the technical documentation for the ship. The Project 22350M frigates are believed to incorporate increased number of VLS cells for combination of 48 or 64 Kalibr, Oniks and Zircon anti-ship cruise missiles while displacing about 7,000 tons. The ships were expected to be laid down in a new boathouse with two slipways at Severnaya Verf which would be completed in 2022.

On 17 August 2022, the United Shipbuilding Corporation stated that they would submit a design proposal for the Project 22350M "Super Gorshkov" to the Ministry of Defence, with a lead vessel laying already planned but not yet publicly known (as of August 2022).

On 2 February 2023, it was reported that the Ministry of Defence would sign a contract for the construction of six Project 22350 and 22350M frigates at the "Army-2023" military exposition, with the Amur Shipyard being ready to begin construction of frigates in 2024. On 3 February it was reported that Project 22350M frigates and possibly some Project 22350 frigates will have their 3S14 vertical launching systems adapted to fire 40N6E long-range anti-aircraft guided missile which are used by the S-400 missile system and have a range of 400 km.

== Design ==
The Admiral Gorshkov class is the successor to the Neustrashimy and Krivak-class frigates. Unlike their Soviet-era predecessors, the new ships are designed for multiple roles. They are to be capable to execute long-range strikes, conduct anti-submarine warfare and to carry out escort missions.

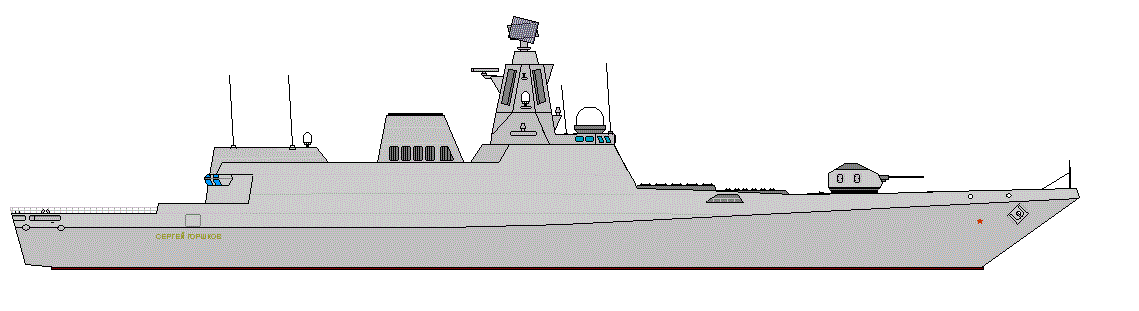
The frigates are designed with a stealthy hull and superstructure to reduce their radar cross-section

The ships also incorporate stealth technology to reduce the radar cross-section.

== Ships ==
Name	Namesake	Builders	Laid down	Launched	Commissioned	Fleet	Status
Admiral Gorshkov	Sergey Georgiyevich Gorshkov	Severnaya Verf, Saint Petersburg	1 February 2006	29 October 2010	28 July 2018	Northern	Active
Admiral Kasatonov	Vladimir Afanasyevich Kasatonov	Severnaya Verf, Saint Petersburg	26 November 2009	12 December 2014	21 July 2020	Northern	Active
Admiral Golovko	Arseniy Grigoriyevich Golovko	Severnaya Verf, Saint Petersburg	1 February 2012	22 May 2020	25 December 2023	Northern	Active
Admiral Isakov	Ivan Stepanovich Isakov	Severnaya Verf, Saint Petersburg	14 November 2013	27 September 2024		Pacific	Fitting out
Admiral Amelko	Nikolai Nikolayevich Amelko	Severnaya Verf, Saint Petersburg	23 April 2019	14 August 2025		Pacific	Fitting out
Admiral Chichagov	Vasily Yakovlevich Chichagov	Severnaya Verf, Saint Petersburg	23 April 2019			Northern	Under construction
Admiral Yumashev	Ivan Stepanovich Yumashev	Severnaya Verf, Saint Petersburg	20 July 2020			Northern	Under construction
Admiral Spiridonov	Emil Nikolayevich Spiridonov	Severnaya Verf, Saint Petersburg	20 July 2020			Northern	Under construction
Admiral Gromov	Feliks Gromov	Severnaya Verf, Saint Petersburg	14 May 2026			Northern	Under construction
Admiral Vysotsky	Vladimir Vysotsky	Severnaya Verf, Saint Petersburg				Pacific	Ordered

== Variants ==
- Project 22350: The original version that has been commissioned.
- Project 22350 upgraded: With 32 UKSK VLS cells (for cruise missiles) instead of 16.
- Project 22356: Export version of Project 22350, first unveiled during the international exhibition Euronaval-2010.
- Project 22350M: First unveiled in 2014, the ship is dubbed "Super Gorshkov" for its enlarged hull with an increased displacement of 8,000 tons, pyramidal mast and 64 VLS cells for Kalibr, Oniks and Tsircon anti-ship cruise missiles, being developed for the Russian Navy. In 2020, it was reported that design work was to be finished in 2022 after which a lead vessel of the upgraded class was projected to be laid down. A year later, the deputy CEO for military shipbuilding of the United Shipbuilding Corporation (USC), Vladimir Korolyov, was reported to have told the TASS news agency that design of the ship would in fact be completed in 2023 with the first ship expected to be laid down in 2024. He said that 12 vessels were planned and that they were to carry up to 64 Kalibr, Onyx and Tsirkon cruise missiles along with the Poliment-Redut air defense missile system, with up to 100 missiles. The ships would also be equipped for anti-submarine warfare. As of 2025, the design reportedly remained under development.

== Gallery ==
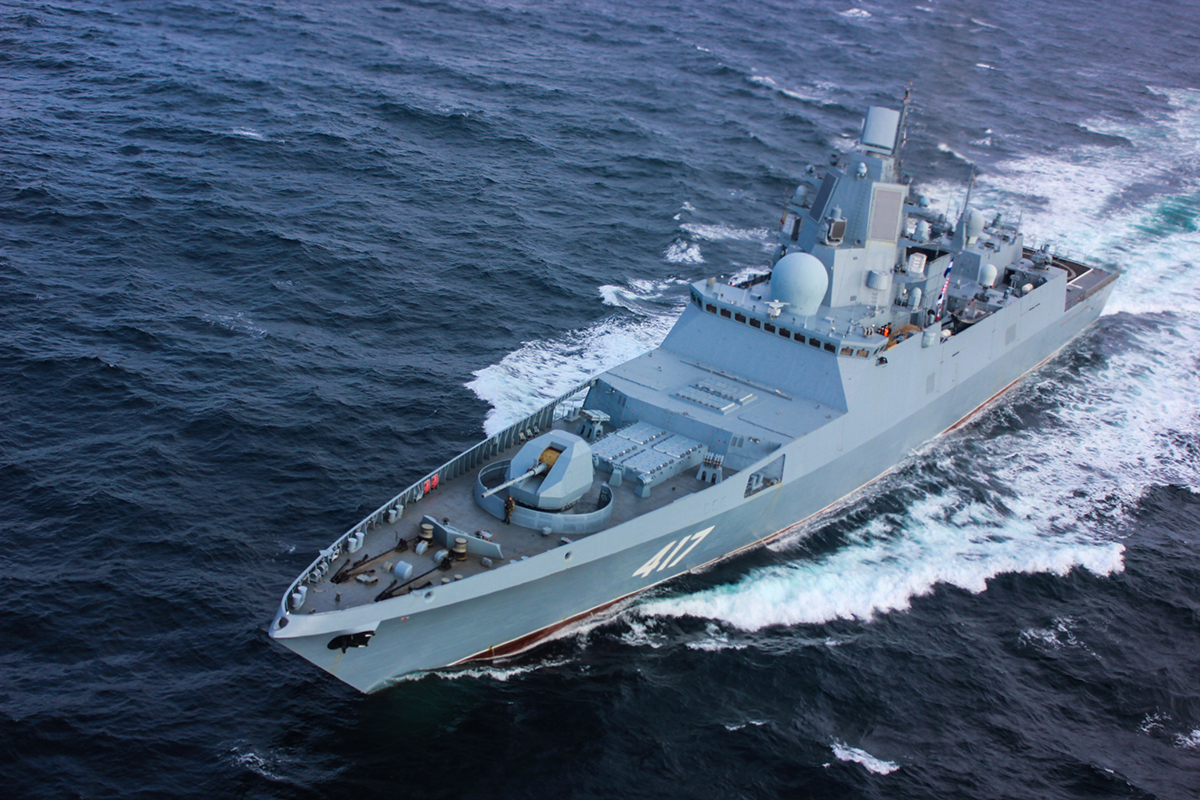
The Admiral Gorshkov port bow view showing its main armaments A-192, Redut anti-air missiles, and 3S14 VLS.

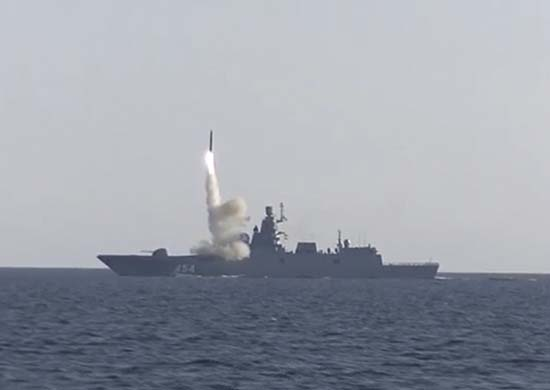
Admiral Gorshkov launches a 3M22 Zircon missile

The Admiral Gorshkov firing its Redut SAMs

== See also ==
- List of frigate classes in service
- List of ships of Russia by project number

=== Equivalent frigates of the same era ===
- De Zeven Provinciën class
- Sachsen class
- FREMM
- Iver Huitfeldt class
- Type 054A
- Shivalik class
- Álvaro de Bazán class
