= Feliks Gromov =

Soviet and Russian admiral (1937–2021)

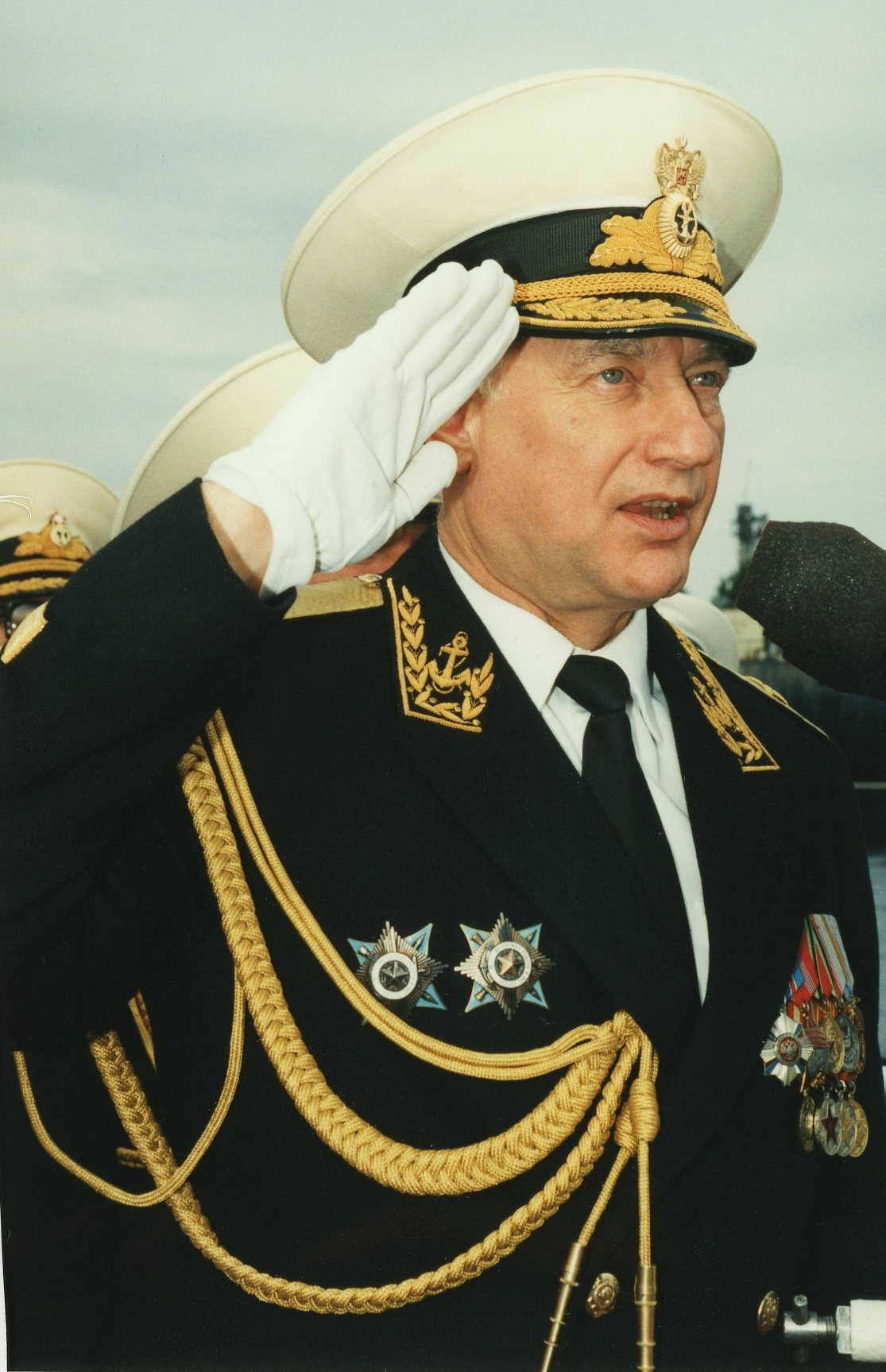
- Born: 29 August 1937; Vladivostok, Russian SFSR, Soviet Union
- Died: 22 January 2021 (aged 83) Moscow, Russia
- Buried: Federal Military Memorial Cemetery
- Allegiance: Soviet Union (to 1991); Russia
- Branch: Soviet Navy; Russian Navy
- Service years: 1955–1997
- Rank: Admiral of the Fleet
- Commands: Commander-in-Chief of the Russian Navy; Northern Fleet; 8th Operational Squadron; Admiral Senyavin; Dmitry Pozharsky
- Awards: Order of Merit for the Fatherland; Order of Military Merit; Order of the October Revolution; Order for Service to the Homeland in the Armed Forces of the USSR, 1st & 2nd class
- Education: Makarov Pacific Higher Naval School; Grechko Naval Academy; Voroshilov General Staff Academy

Admiral of the Fleet Feliks Nikolayevich Gromov (Note: Russian: Феликс Николаевич Громов) (29 August 1937 – 22 January 2021) was a Russian naval officer who served as Commander-in-Chief of the Russian Navy from 1992 to 1997. Gromov was the first head of the Russian Navy after the dissolution of the Soviet Union, when it faced severe budget cuts. He spent much of his career as a destroyer and cruiser officer. His previous commands included the Northern Fleet from 1988 to 1992, a squadron, and two cruisers.

== Biography ==
Gromov was born in Vladivostok on 29 August 1937. He attended the S.O. Makarov Pacific Higher Naval School, located in his home town, which he graduated from in 1959 and commissioned as a Soviet Navy officer.

Gromov began his service in the Pacific Fleet before getting reassigned to the Strategic Missile Forces in 1960. But he preferred the Navy, and was able to return to naval service in May 1961. He then served as an officer on destroyers and cruisers in the Pacific Fleet. Gromov became the senior assistant to the commander of the Sverdlov-class cruiser Admiral Senyavin in 1970, then the commander of the Sverdlov-class Dmitry Pozharsky in 1972, and commander of Admiral Senyavin in 1975. Gromov completed academic courses of the Grechko Naval Academy in 1977 before being assigned as chief of staff of the 4th Training Ship Division at the Leningrad naval base.

Between 1981 and 1983 he became chief of staff and then the commander of the 8th Operational Squadron of the Pacific Fleet. In 1983 Gromov graduated from the Grechko Naval Academy, and in 1984 he was made the chief of staff and first deputy commander of the Northern Fleet. On 19 March 1988 he was made the commander of the Northern Fleet, and in 1991 he graduated from the Voroshilov General Staff Academy by distance learning. Vice Admiral Gromov did what he could to prevent officers and sailors from leaving the fleet during the dissolution of the Soviet Union, and to maintain the combat readiness of the fleet's bases. During his tenure the Northern Fleet also experienced an accident, the loss of the submarine K-278 Komsomolets in the Norwegian Sea in 1989.

In the spring of 1992 he was transferred to Moscow and was later promoted to admiral. Gromov was first designated the deputy commander of the Commonwealth of Independent States navy in January 1992. However, in March 1992, when it became clear the CIS military structure was not going to last, he was given the same role in the Russian Navy. On 12 March he relinquished command of the Northern Fleet to Vice Admiral Oleg Yerofeyev. In August 1992 Gromov was appointed the as Commander-in-Chief of the Russian Navy. His tenure over the next five years is considered the most difficult period in the history of the Russian Navy, and Russia as a whole. He worked to preserve a core of the fleet as it faced large budget cuts in the immediate post-Soviet years. On 13 June 1996, Gromov was promoted to admiral of the fleet by Russian President Boris Yeltsin.

He retired on 7 November 1997 and was succeeded by Admiral Vladimir Kuroyedov. In his retirement, he was a member of the "Admirals' Club" civic organization. From 2008 Gromov was the main inspector-general at the Office of Inspectors General of the Ministry of Defense. He died at his dacha near Moscow on 22 January 2021 and was buried at the Federal Military Memorial Cemetery.

== Awards and decorations ==
Russian and Soviet:

- Order of Merit for the Fatherland
- Order of Military Merit
- Order of the October Revolution
- Order for Service to the Homeland in the Armed Forces of the USSR, 1st & 2nd class

== Notes ==
Military offices
Preceded by Ivan Kapitanets	Commander of the Northern Fleet; 1988–1992	Succeeded by Oleg Yerofeyev
Preceded by Vladimir Chernavin as Commander-in-Chief of the Soviet Navy	Commander-in-Chief of the Russian Navy; 1992–1997	Succeeded by Vladimir Kuroyedov
