= Valery Varfolomeyev =

Russian naval officer

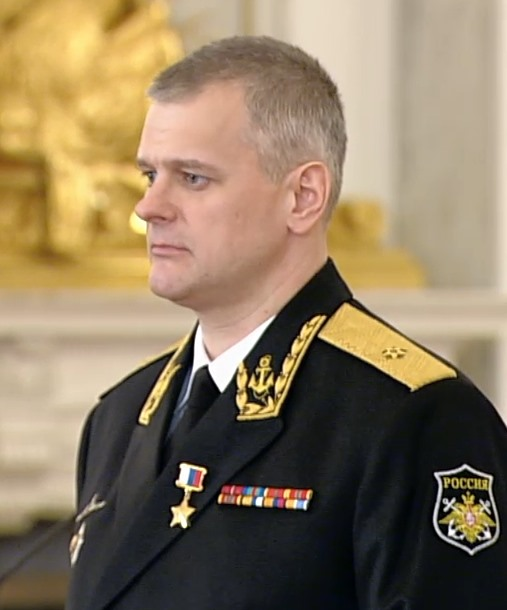
- Native name: Валерий Владимирович Варфоломеев
- Born: 13 August 1971 (age 54); Vladivostok, Primorsky Krai, Russian SFSR, USSR
- Allegiance: Soviet Union; Russia
- Branch: Soviet Navy; Russian Navy
- Service years: 1988–present
- Rank: Rear-Admiral
- Commands: Orel; 11th Submarine Division
- Awards: Hero of the Russian Federation; Medal of the Order "For Merit to the Fatherland" Second Class

Valery Vladimirovich Varfolomeyev (Russian: Валерий Владимирович Варфоломеев; born 13 August 1971) is an officer of the Russian Navy. He currently holds the rank of rear-admiral, and is chief of staff of the Joint Command of Troops and Forces in the North-East of Russia.

Born the son of a naval officer in the port city of Vladivostok, Varfolomeyev attended the Nakhimov Naval School in Leningrad, and after graduation in 1988, joined the navy, enrolling in the Higher Naval School of Submarine Navigation. The dissolution of the Soviet Union occurred in 1991, during the period of his study, and on graduating in 1993 he joined the Russian Navy's Northern Fleet, serving in the torpedo departments of submarines. He gradually rose through the ranks and positions, interspersed with further study at the navy's academic institutions, before taking on his own command, that of the Oscar II-class submarine Orel in 2004.

In 2009 Varfolomeyev became deputy commander of the 11th Submarine Division, and then its commander in 2014. He took part in the Russian military intervention in the Syrian Civil War, and was awarded the title of Hero of the Russian Federation on 8 December 2017 for "courage and heroism in the performance of military duty". He was presented with his award by President Vladimir Putin at a ceremony on 28 December. After completing studies at the Military Academy of the General Staff of the Armed Forces, Varfolomeyev became deputy commander of the Pacific Fleet's submarine forces in 2020.

== Early career ==
Varfolomeyev was born on 13 August 1971 in Vladivostok, Primorsky Krai, then part of the Russian Soviet Federative Socialist Republic, in the Soviet Union. His father was a naval officer, and commander of a strategic nuclear submarine. After graduating school he attended the Nakhimov Naval School between 1985 and 1988, and entered the Soviet Navy in August 1988, attending the Higher Naval School of Submarine Navigation and graduating in 1993. In June that year he joined the 11th Submarine Division of the Northern Fleet, serving aboard the Victor III-class submarine B-502 in the torpedo department. He transferred to the Oscar II-class submarine Smolensk in September 1994, still in the torpedo department, but from January 1997 to October 1997 Varfolomeyev was assistant to the submarine's commander.

Varfolomeyev then took the Higher Special Officer Classes of the Navy, graduating in 1998. In July 1998 he transferred to the Oscar II-class Orel as assistant commander, then as senior assistant to the commander from April 2000. During this period another Oscar II-class submarine, the Kursk, was in service with the Northern Fleet. In August 2000 the Kursk suffered a series of explosions and sank in the Barents Sea, killing the entire crew. For Varfolomeyev, who had sailed aboard her and had friends on her, the loss was "the most bitter episode". Varfolomeyev was present at the rescue attempts, aboard the hospital ship Svir. In May 2004 he became commander of the Orel, a post he held until September 2007.

== Staff posts and honours ==
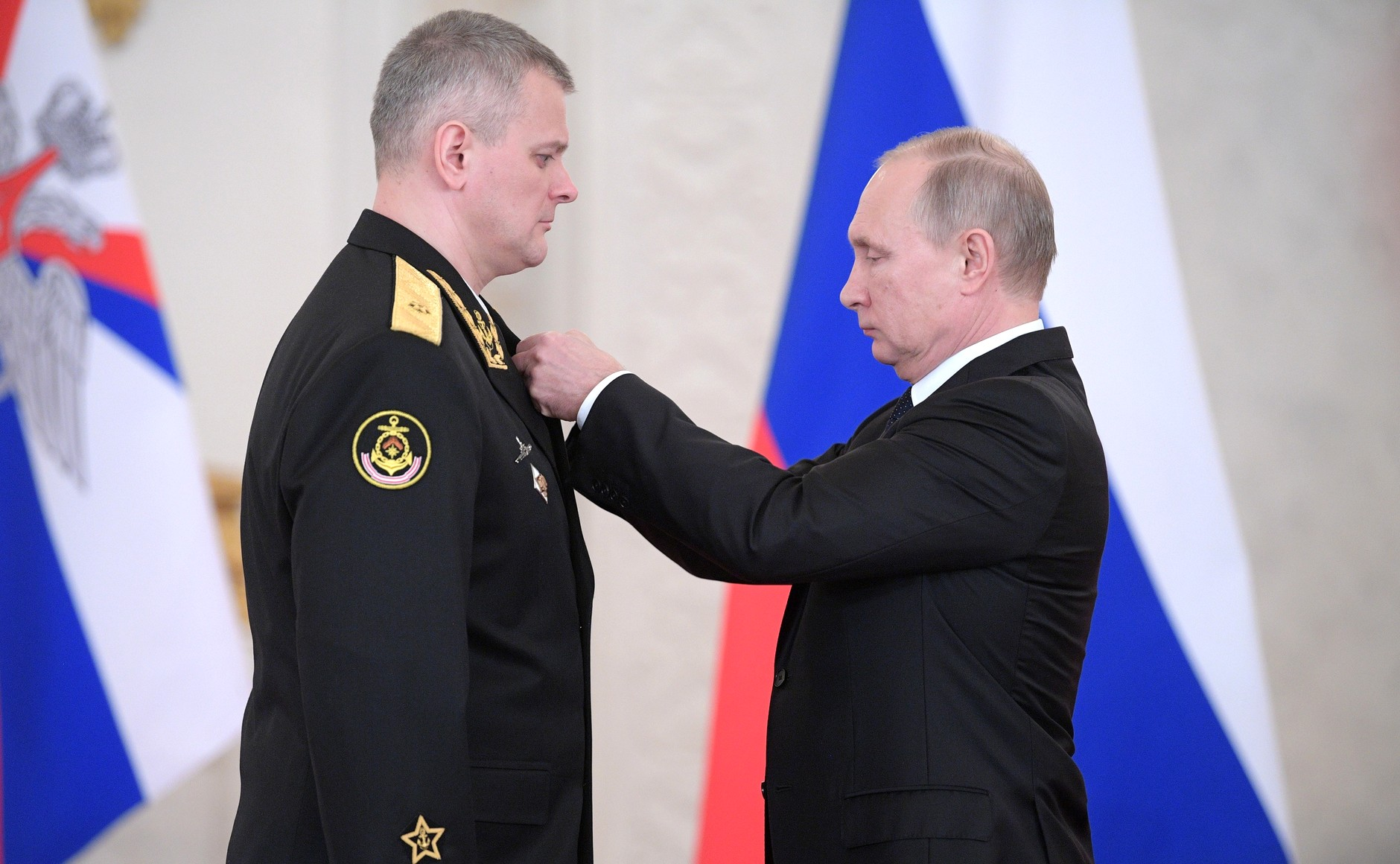
President Vladimir Putin presents Varfolomeyev with the title of Hero of the Russian Federation at a ceremony on 28 December 2017

Varfolomeyev then attended the N. G. Kuznetsov Naval Academy, graduating in 2009. In June that year he became deputy commander of the 11th Submarine Division, and in May 2013 commander of the 339th separate brigade of submarines under construction or repair at the White Sea Naval Base. In November 2014 he was appointed commander of the 11th Submarine Division, based at Zaozyorsk, and concurrently head of the town's garrison. As part of his military service, Varfolomeyev took part in the Russian military intervention in the Syrian Civil War, and was promoted to rear-admiral on 11 December 2015. He was awarded the title of Hero of the Russian Federation on 8 December 2017 for "courage and heroism in the performance of military duty", and was presented with his award by President Vladimir Putin at a ceremony on 28 December in the Saint George Hall at the Grand Kremlin Palace.

In 2017 Varfolomeyev's 11th Submarine Division was recognised as the best submarine formation in the Northern Fleet that year, at a meeting of the fleet's military council led by Admiral Nikolai Yevmenov. In September 2018 Varfolomeyev became a student at the Military Academy of the General Staff of the Armed Forces, in the faculty of national security and state defence. After completing his studies, he took up the post of deputy commander of the Pacific Fleet's submarine forces. In February 2023 he was appointed chief of staff of the Joint Command of Troops and Forces in the North-East of Russia.

== Honours and awards ==
In addition to the title of Hero of the Russian Federation, Varfolomeyev has been awarded various medals, including the Medal of the Order "For Merit to the Fatherland" Second Class. He also received the non-governmental medal "A Century of the Russian Submarine Forces", awarded by the United Russia political party in 2006. On 27 July 2017, as part of the celebrations of the 75 anniversary of the founding of the city of Severodvinsk, Varfolomeyev received an honorary watch from the Governor of Arkhangelsk Oblast Igor Orlov.

== See also ==
- List of Heroes of the Russian Federation
