= 5P-42 Filin =

Russian electro-optic countermeasure system

The 5P-42 Filin (eagle owl) is a Russian electro-optic countermeasure system developed by Roselectronics for the Russian Armed Forces. The system is designed to disrupt the enemy combatants' eyesight at night and prevent them from targeting a protected platform. Besides that, it is also capable of suppressing night vision devices, laser rangefinders, anti-tank missiles, and other electro-optical sight systems. It was first unveiled in December 2018, and its naval version is currently being deployed at the Admiral Gorshkov-class frigates.

== Design ==
The 5P-42 Filin creates a powerful beam of light, similar to the strobe-like effect, preventing enemy soldiers from aiming and targeting protected platforms, especially if they are using guns. During tests, volunteers reported having trouble reaching their targets that were protected by the system when shooting with rifles and guns, because they couldn't see. Additionally, about half of the volunteers said they felt dizzy, nauseous, and disoriented, and about 20 percent of the volunteers reported experiencing hallucinations. The effective range of the system is 500–700 m (0.31–0.43 mi) while its impact angle is 10-15 degrees. The Filin can be also effectively used against various military electronics operating in the optical spectrum such as infrared laser rangefinders, night-vision goggles, or anti-tank missile launchers at a distance of up to 5 km (3.1 mi).

The system is intended to be used in the Navy, Army, and possibly also with law enforcement and the national guard units of Russia.

== Operational history ==
In February 2019, Russian Admiral Gorshkov and Admiral Kasatonov frigates became the first to use the countermeasure, each frigate was fitted with two 5P-42 Filin stations.

== Operators ==
Russia

- Russian Navy
