= K266 =

K266 or K-266 may refer to:

- K-266 (Kansas highway), a state highway in Kansas
- Russian submarine Orel (K-266), a Russian submarine
