= Soviet Navy 8th Operational Squadron =

8th Operational Squadron
- 8-я оперативная эскадра
- Founded: 12 March 1974; 52 years ago
- Disbanded: 1991
- Country: Soviet Union
- Branch: Soviet Navy
- Type: Naval squadron
- Part of: Pacific Fleet
- Nickname: "Indian"

Insignia
- Abbreviation: 8 OpEsk

The 8th "Indian" Operational Squadron of the Soviet Navy (Russian: 8-я «Индийская» оперативная эскадра кораблей ВМФ) was an operational squadron of the ships of the Soviet Navy intended to carry out combat missions in the Indian Ocean and Persian Gulf during the Cold War between the USSR (as part of the Warsaw Pact) and the United States (as part of the NATO). The 8th Operational Squadron's primary adversary in the Indian Ocean and Persian Gulf was the US Navy's 7th Fleet, whose actions were continuously monitored and escorted by the squadron's ships. The 8th Squadron was disbanded by a directive from the Russian Navy General Staff on October 29, 1992.

== History ==
The predecessor of the 8th operational squadron was the 1st mixed operational brigade, created in 1973, and before it, a permanent Soviet naval presence in the Indian Ocean had been maintained since 1971, carried out by ships of the Soviet Navy Pacific Fleet, but did not have a permanent organizational structure (temporary detachments of ships with field headquarters on board were created).

The squadron was formed by the directive of the General Staff of the Navy on March 12, 1974, and was formed from the Pacific Fleet.

The squadron's ships participated in combat minesweeping and salvage operations in Bangladesh (1972–1974), in the Suez Canal mine clearing operation in 1974–1975 (it is noteworthy that the fleets of potential adversaries, the USSR and the United States, simultaneously participated in the canal minesweeping operation), and in the evacuation of Soviet and Cuban specialists using a show of force from Somalia in 1977 in connection with the Ethiopian-Somali War.

Ships of the 8th Operational Squadron provided support to Ethiopian government forces in the fight against Eritrean separatists. Thus, in the autumn of 1977, a Soviet naval infantry force was landed in the port of Massawa, which was blockaded by separatists, and took part in the fighting, and in December 1977–January 1978, the Soviet destroyer Veskiy allegedly provided artillery support to Ethiopian troops in battles with Eritrean separatists in the area of this port; (members of the destroyer's crew denied this).

During the Iran-Iraq War (1980–1988) and the Operation Desert Storm (1991), the squadron's ships provided security for Soviet tankers and dry cargo ships sailing through the Oman and Persian Gulfs.

In 1988, the 8th squadron included more than 20 ships and support vessels; in addition, patrol ships and minesweepers from the Black Sea Fleet, as well as ships from the Northern and Pacific Fleets, were sent to reinforce it.

The 8th Operational Squadron had operational control over the naval logistics support point on Nokra Island in Ethiopia in the Red Sea.

== Literature ==
- Бирилло Н. Н. 8-я оперативная эскадра кораблей Военно-Морского Флота СССР: ВМФ СССР в операционной зоне Индийского океана. Исторические хроники боевой службы 8-й ОПЭСК ВМФ. 1974-1992 гг. — М.: Кучково поле, 2010. — 431 с. — 500 экз. — ISBN 978-5-9950-0098-3.
- Фёдоров В. М. «Жаркие» мили Индийской эскадры. — М.: [б. и.], 2016. — 575 с. — ISBN 978-5-88149-520-6.
- Коряковцев А. А., Ташлыков С. Л. Противостояние ВМФ СССР и ВМС США в Индийском океане в годы «холодной войны». // Военно-исторический журнал. — 2019. — № 7. — С.14—18.
