= Russian submarine Orel =

Russian nuclear-powered cruise missile submarine

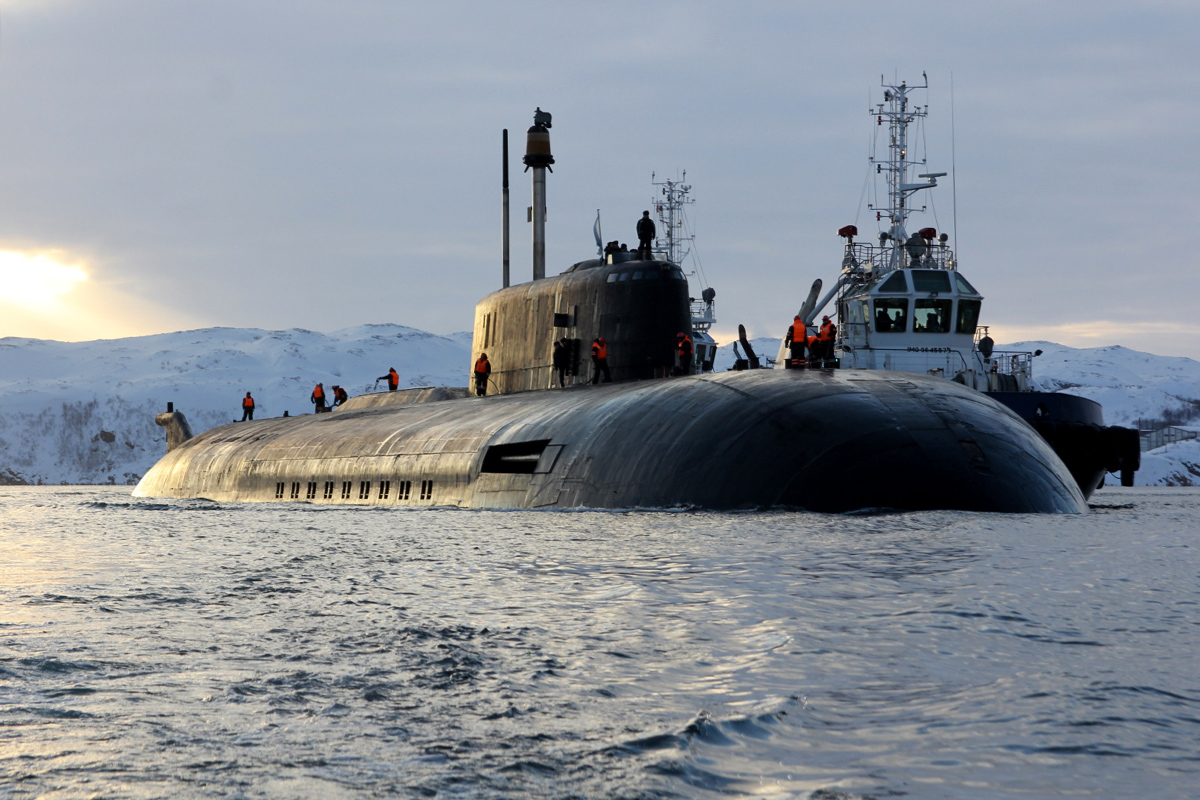
- K-266 arriving to base after repair

History

→ Soviet Union → Russia
- Name: Orel
- Namesake: City of Orel
- Builder: Sevmash (Shipyard 402), Severodvinsk
- Laid down: 19 January 1989
- Launched: 22 May 1992
- Commissioned: 30 December 1992
- Home port: Bolshaya Lopatka, Zaozyorsk
- Status: active

General characteristics
- Class & type: Oscar II Modernized-class submarine
- Displacement: 13,400 t, 16,400 t
- Length: 154.0 m (505 ft 3 in)
- Beam: 18.2 m (59 ft 9 in)
- Draft: 9.0 m (29 ft 6 in)
- Propulsion: 2 nuclear reactors OK-650V (HEU <= 45%), 2 steam turbines, 2/7-bladed propellers
- Speed: 32 knots (59 km/h; 37 mph) submerged, 16 knots (30 km/h; 18 mph) surfaced
- Test depth: 300 to 1,000 m (980 to 3,280 ft) (by various estimates)
- Complement: 44 officers, 68 enlisted
- Armament: since 2017 72 × P-800 (formerly 24 × P-700), 4 × 533 mm and 2 × 650 mm bow torpedo tubes

K-266 Orel is a Project 949AM (Antey modernized) nuclear-powered cruise missile submarine (SSGN) (NATO codename Oscar II). She is one of three Oscar II submarines still serving in the Russian Northern Fleet, all assigned to the 11th Submarine Division, berthed at Guba Bolshaya Lopatka (part of Zapadnaya Litsa, also known as Zaozersk), on the Kola Peninsula northwest of Severomorsk.

== History ==
She was laid down at the Sevmash Shipyard in Severodvinsk on 19 January 1989. From 1991 to 1993 she was known as Severodvinsk, but was renamed Orel on 20 March 1993 or 6 April 1993 and entered service with the Russian Navy that same year. Between May 2004 and September 2007 her commander was Valery Varfolomeyev, an officer who had first joined the submarine as assistant commander in June 1998, and then became senior assistant to the commander from April 2000.

The Russian newspaper Izvestia reported that Orel was to be overhauled in 2013. She had her shaft-line changed to correct problems during construction that left her very easily tracked by sonar. Additionally, her P-700 Granit (NATO codename SS-N-19 Shipwreck) anti-ship submarine launched cruise missiles (SLCM) were replaced by more modern, supersonic, P-800 Oniks (NATO codename SS-N-26) antiship SLCMs. The overhaul was completed and the ship returned to service in 2017.

=== 2015 fire ===
Whilst in dock at the Zvezdochka shipyard on 7 April 2015, it was reported that a fire broke out "in the ninth section of the sub close to the stern". The fire was caused by insulation materials catching fire during welding. It was reported the submarine did not have nuclear weapons or fuel on board at the time.

=== 2017 ===
First modernized unit, Project 949AM.

=== 2021 ===
In July 2021, while returning to Northern Fleet waters from Navy Day commemorations in St. Petersburg, Orel was reported to have "lost power" while transiting on the surface through the Danish straits. She was reported to have been assisted by other Russian vessels accompanying her through the straits. The submarine was later reported to have restored power and continued her transit north submerged.

=== 2025 ===
The submarine remained active as of 2025, participating in exercises that included firing a cruise missile salvo in conjunction with the frigate Admiral Golovko and Russian shore-based missile forces.

=== 2026 ===
Similar exercises, to the ones conducted in 2025, were carried out in 2026.

== See also ==
- List of Russian military accidents
