= Soviet cruiser Dmitry Pozharsky =

Soviet Sverdlov-class cruiser

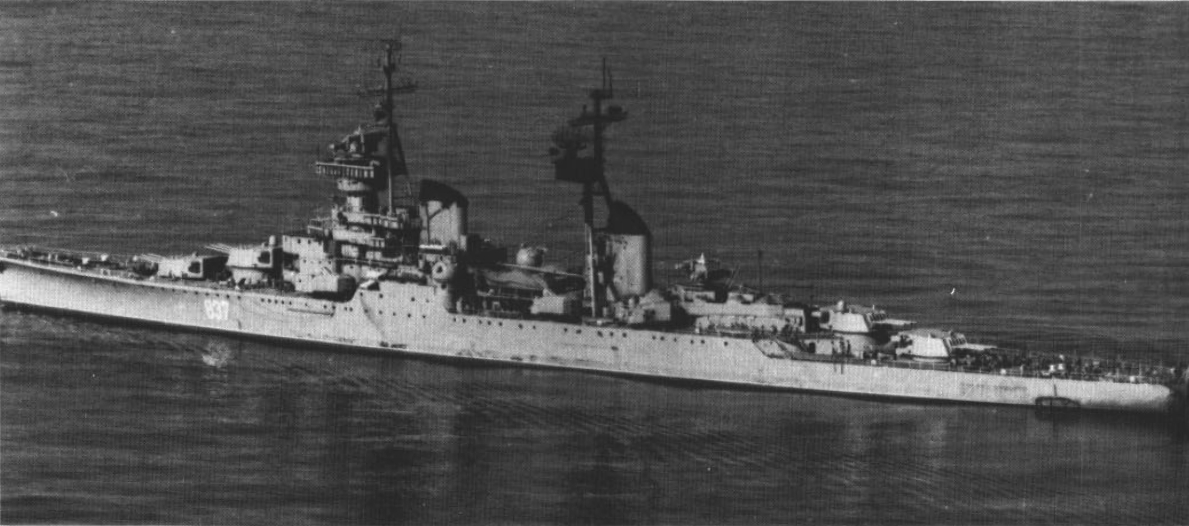
- Dmitry Pozharsky in 1974

History

Soviet Union
- Name: Dmitry Pozharsky; (Дмитрий Пожарский)
- Namesake: Dmitry Pozharsky
- Ordered: 31 August 1951
- Builder: Baltic Shipyard, Leningrad
- Yard number: 445
- Laid down: 28 February 1952
- Launched: 25 June 1953
- Commissioned: 31 December 1954
- Decommissioned: 5 March 1987
- Stricken: 16 September 1987
- Identification: See Pennant numbers
- Fate: Scrapped, 1990

General characteristics
- Class & type: Sverdlov-class cruiser
- Displacement: 13,600 tonnes (13,385 long tons) standard; 16,640 tonnes (16,377 long tons) full load
- Length: 210 m (689 ft 0 in) overall; 205 m (672 ft 7 in) waterline
- Beam: 22 m (72 ft 2 in)
- Draught: 6.9 m (22 ft 8 in)
- Propulsion: 2 × shaft geared steam turbines; 6 × boilers, 110,000 hp (82,000 kW)
- Speed: 32.5 knots (60.2 km/h; 37.4 mph)
- Range: 9,000 nmi (17,000 km; 10,000 mi) at 18 knots (33 km/h; 21 mph)
- Complement: 1,250
- Sensors & processing systems: P-8 air-search radar (from 1957); P-10 air-search radar; P-12 air-search radar (replaced P-8/P-10); P-500 Kliver air/surface-search radar
- Electronic warfare & decoys: Krab-12 ESM radar
- Armament: 4 × triple 15.2 cm (6.0 in)/57 cal B-38 guns in Mk5-bis turrets; 6 × twin 10 cm (3.9 in)/56 cal Model 1934 guns in SM-5-1 mounts; 16 × twin 3.7 cm (1.5 in) AA guns in V-11M mounts; 2 × quintuple 533 mm (21.0 in) torpedo tubes in PTA-53-68-bis mounts
- Armour: Belt: 100 mm (3.9 in); Conning tower: 150 mm (5.9 in); Deck: 50 mm (2.0 in); Turrets: 175 mm (6.9 in) front, 65 mm (2.6 in) sides, 60 mm (2.4 in) rear, 75 mm (3.0 in) roof; Barbettes: 130 mm (5.1 in); Bulkheads: 100–120 mm (3.9–4.7 in)

Dmitry Pozharsky was a Sverdlov-class cruiser of the Soviet Navy.

== Development and design ==
The Sverdlov-class cruisers, Soviet designation Project 68bis, were the last conventional gun cruisers built for the Soviet Navy. They were built in the 1950s and were based on Soviet, German, and Italian designs and concepts developed prior to the Second World War. They were modified to improve their seakeeping capabilities, allowing them to run at high speed in the rough waters of the North Atlantic. The basic hull was more modern and had better armor protection than the vast majority of the post-Second World War gun cruiser designs built and deployed by peer nations. They also carried an extensive suite of modern radar equipment and anti-aircraft artillery. The Soviets originally planned to build 40 ships in the class, which would be supported by the Stalingrad-class battlecruisers and aircraft carriers.

The Sverdlov class displaced 13,600 tons standard and 16,640 tons at full load. They were 210 metres (689 ft 0 in) long overall and 205 metres (672 ft 7 in) long at the waterline. They had a beam of 22 metres (72 ft 2 in) and draught of 6.9 metres (22 ft 8 in) and typically had a complement of 1,250. The hull was a completely welded new design and the ships had a double bottom for over 75% of their length. The ship also had twenty-three watertight bulkheads. The Sverdlovs had six boilers providing steam to two shaft-geared steam turbines generating 118,100 shaft horsepower (88,100 kW). This gave the ships a maximum speed of 32.5 knots (60.2 km/h; 37.4 mph). The cruisers had a range of 9,000 nautical miles (17,000 km; 10,000 mi) at 18 knots (33 km/h; 21 mph).

The Sverdlov-class cruisers' main armament included twelve 152 mm (6 in)/57 cal B-38 guns mounted in four triple Mk5-bis turrets. They also had twelve 100 mm (3.9 in)/56 cal Model 1934 guns in six twin SM-5-1 mounts. For anti-aircraft weaponry, the cruisers had thirty-two 37 mm (1.5 in) anti-aircraft guns in sixteen twin mounts and were also equipped with ten 533 mm (21 in) torpedo tubes in two mountings of five each.

The Sverdlovs had 100 mm (3.9 in) belt armor and had a 50 mm (2.0 in) armored deck. The turrets were shielded by 175 mm (6.9 in) armor and the conning tower, by 150 mm (5.9 in) armor.

The cruisers' ultimate radar suite included one 'Big Net' or 'Top Trough' air search radar, one 'High Sieve' or 'Low Sieve' air search radar, one 'Knife Rest' air search radar and one 'Slim Net' air search radar. For navigational radar they had one 'Don-2' or 'Neptune' model. For fire control purposes the ships were equipped with two 'Sun Visor' radars, two 'Top Bow' 152 mm gun radars and eight 'Egg Cup' gun radars. For electronic countermeasures the ships were equipped with two 'Watch Dog' ECM systems.

== Construction and career ==
The Dmitry Pozharsky was built at the Baltic Shipyard in Leningrad and was launched on 25 June 1953 and commissioned into the Northern Fleet on 31 December 1954.

On 31 January 1955, it entered service the 4th Navy. On 24 February, it was transferred to the Northern Fleet. On 7 September, after crossing the Northern Sea Route from Severomorsk to the Far East, it was transferred to the Pacific Fleet.

On 21–26 June 1956, she visited Shanghai.

In 1964, having on board the cadets, it completed a cruise through the Sea of Japan, the East China Sea, the South China Sea, and the Philippine Sea, and returned to Vladivostok through the Tsugaru Strait.

From March to July 1968, the Dmitry Pozharsky visited Madras, Bombay, Mogadishu, Umm Qasr, Karachi, Bandar Abbas, Aden and lastly Colombo.

From 25 April 1969 to 23 October 1970, the vessel was overhauled at Dalzavod in Vladivostok.

In 1971, a cruise with cadets along the previous 1964 cruise's route was undertaken.

From 10 November 1974 to 10 June 1975, it was on active duty in the Indian Ocean tracking the aircraft carrier USS Constellation, with visits to Madras, Mogadishu, Aden, and Port Louis.

Upon arrival in Port Louis, from February 15 to March 1, 1975 the ship's crew, together with the PM-125, provided assistance to the population, then suffering from the effects of the tropical hurricane Gervaise, for two weeks.

From June to July 1977, the Dmitry Pozharsky undertook a training cruise for first-year cadets named after S.O. Makarova. They went around Japan, through the Korean Strait, then with a call to Sovetskaya Gavan, and back to Vladivostok through the Fourth Kuril Strait and through the La Pérouse Strait.

On 30 January 1979, repairs on the ship began at Dalzavod in Vladivostok. At this point it was relegated to the reserve and removed from active service.

On 5 March 1987, it was disarmed and decommissioned, and struck on 16 September.

In 1990, it was sold to a private firm for breaking in India.

=== Pennant numbers ===
Date	Pennant number
	12
1954	56
1956	55
1957	71
1964	619
1966	636
1967	824
1970	835
1971	633
1972	833
	021
1974	837
	881
1976	823
1976	012
1977	832
1980	027
1987	023

== Gallery ==
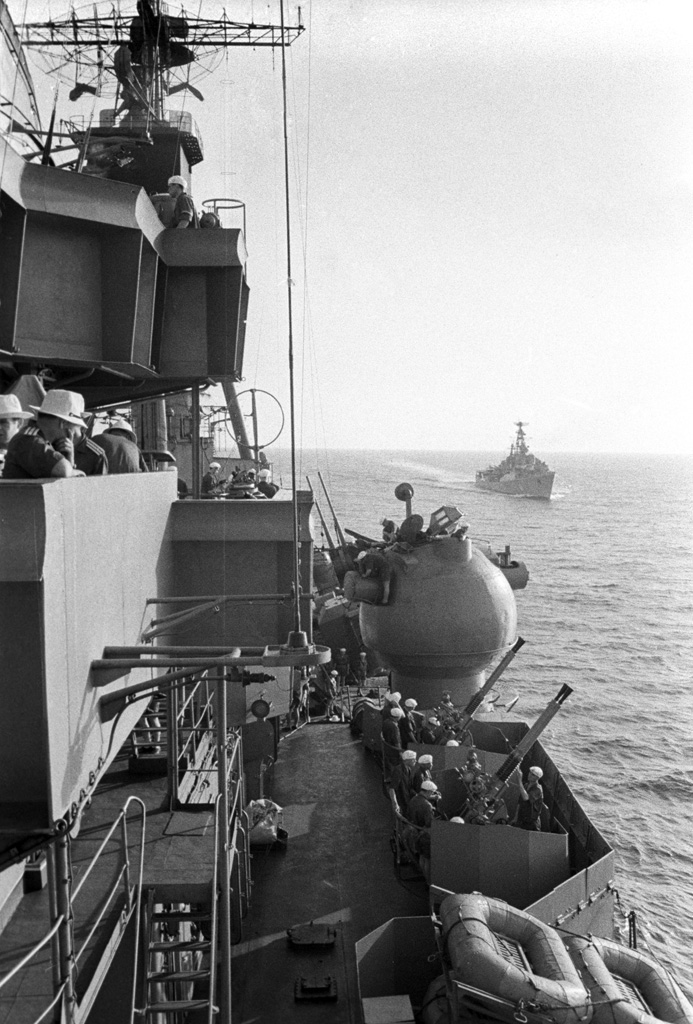
Dmitry Pozharsky on 1 May 1968

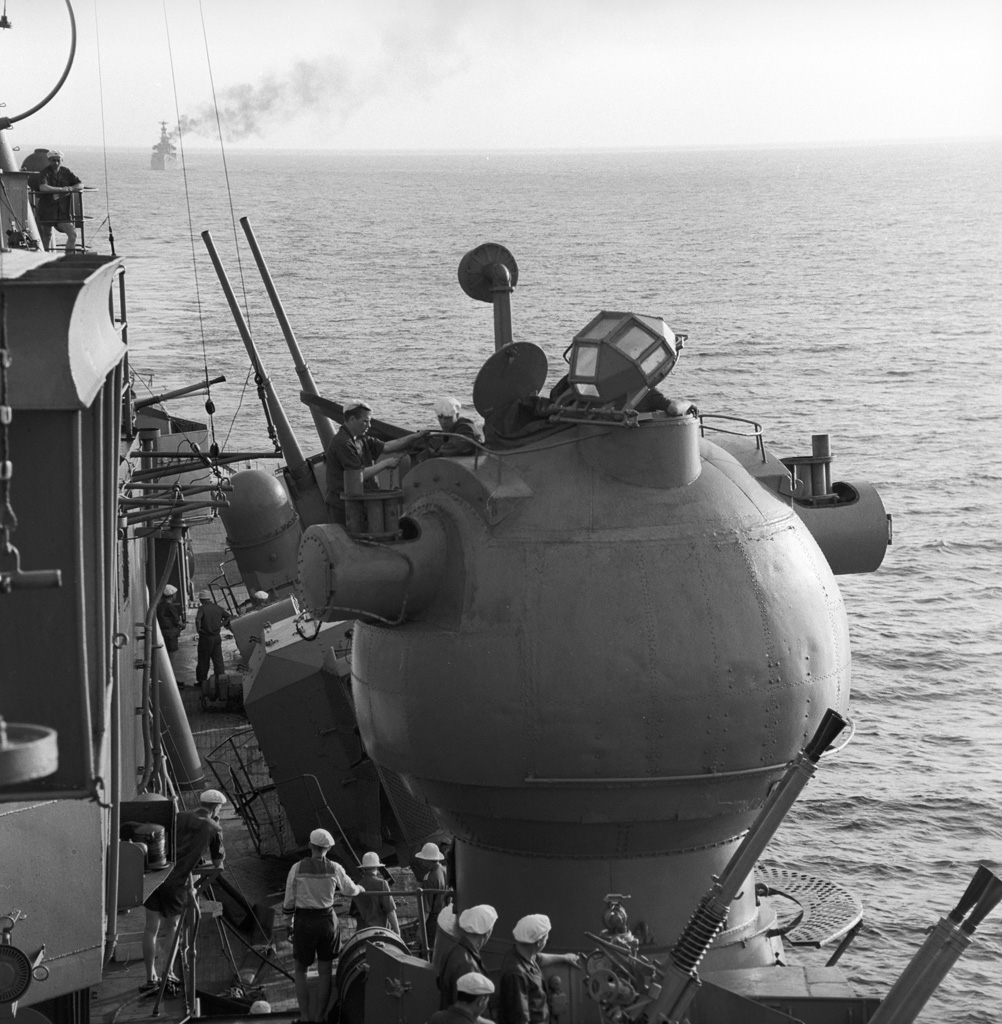

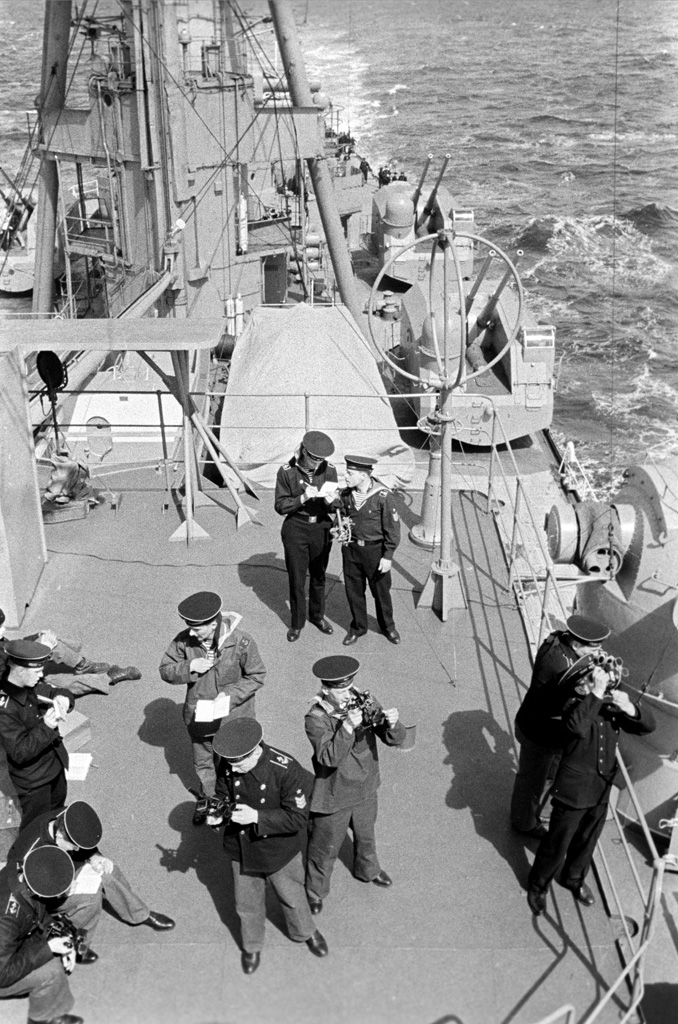

== See also ==
- Cruiser
- Sverdlov-class cruiser
- List of ships of the Soviet Navy
- List of ships of Russia by project number
