= Russian frigate Admiral Golovko =

Sergey Gorshkov-class frigate of the Russian Navy

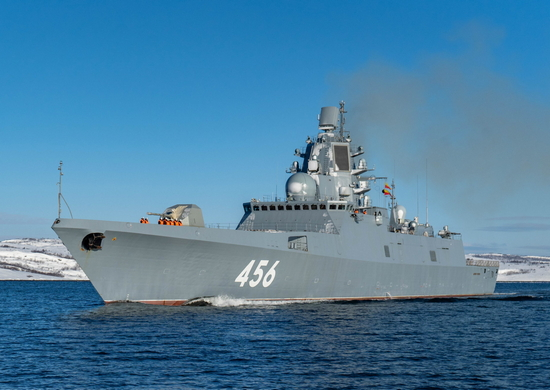
- Admiral Golovko during sea trials, 2023

History

Russia
- Name: Admiral Golovko; (Адмирал Головко)
- Namesake: Arseny Golovko
- Builder: Severnaya Verf, Saint Petersburg
- Laid down: 1 February 2012
- Launched: 22 May 2020
- Commissioned: 25 December 2023
- Identification: Pennant number: 456
- Status: Active

General characteristics
- Class & type: Admiral Gorshkov-class frigate
- Displacement: Standard: 4,500 tons; Full: 5,400 tons
- Length: 135 m (443 ft)
- Beam: 16 m (52 ft)
- Draught: 4.5 m (15 ft)
- Propulsion: 2 shaft CODAG; 2 10D49 cruise diesel engines 5,200 shp (3,900 kW); 2 M90FR boost gas turbines 27,500 shp (20,500 kW); Total: 65,400 shp (48,800 kW)
- Speed: 29.5 knots (54.6 km/h; 33.9 mph)
- Range: 4,850 nmi (8,980 km; 5,580 mi) at 14 kn (26 km/h; 16 mph)
- Endurance: 30 days
- Complement: 210
- Sensors & processing systems: Air search radar(S): Furke-4 5P-27 main radar for Detection, tracking and targeting of air and surface targets; Surface search radar: Monolit 34K1 surface search, AShM and additional artillery targeting radar; Main Artillery radar fire control system: Puma 5P-10; Sonar: Zarya M sonar, Vinyetka towed array sonar; Navigation: 3 × Pal-N radars; Other: 2 × target illuminators aft superstructure for Palash CIWS; Communications: Vigstar Centaurus-NM; Electro-Optical Systems: 2 × MTK-201M and 2 × 5P-520; Combat system: Sigma/Sigma 22350
- Electronic warfare & decoys: EW Suite: Prosvet-M; Countermeasures: 2 × PU KT-308; 8 × PU KT-216; 2 × 5P-42 Filin
- Armament: 1 × 130 mm Amethyst/Arsenal A-192M naval gun; 16 (2 × 8) UKSK VLS cells for Kalibr, Oniks or Zircon anti-ship cruise missiles; 32 (2 × 16) Redut VLS cells for 9M96, 9M96M, 9M96D/9M96DM(M2) and/or quad-packed 9M100 surface-to-air missiles; 2 × Palash CIWS; 2 × 4 330 mm torpedo tubes for Paket-NK anti-torpedo/anti-submarine torpedoes; 2 × 14.5 mm MTPU pedestal machine guns
- Aircraft carried: 1 × Ka-27 series helicopter
- Aviation facilities: Helipad and hangar for one helicopter

Admiral Golovko is an Admiral Gorshkov-class frigate of the Russian Navy. She is the first ship in the class to be equipped with domestic powerplant, rather than imported from Ukraine.

== Design ==
The Admiral Gorshkov class is the successor to the Neustrashimy and Krivak-class frigates. Unlike their Soviet-era predecessors, the new ships are designed for multiple roles. They are to be capable to execute long-range strikes, conduct anti-submarine warfare and to carry out escort missions.

== Construction and career ==
Admiral Golovko was laid down on 1 February 2012, and launched on 22 May 2020 by Severnaya Verf in Saint Petersburg. It was reported that Admiral Golovko would be the first Russian surface ship to be armed with Tsirkon hypersonic missiles, but the Russian frigate Admiral Gorshkov, lead vessel of the class, was the first ship armed with the Tsirkon hypersonic missile.

On 26 November 2022, Admiral Golovko went to the sea for the first time and started factory sea trials. On 23 November 2023, Admiral Golovko successfully completed its sea trials in the Barents Sea. On 25 December, Admiral Golovko was commissioned into the Russian Navy, with Russian President Vladimir Putin being present. She arrived at her homeport of Severomorsk, in the Northern Fleet area of operations, on 11 January 2024.

In 2025, the frigate participated in exercises that included firing a cruise missile salvo in conjunction with the cruise missile submarine Orel and Russian shore-based missile forces. She was again reported active on exercises in 2026. In late 2026, the frigate was reported in the Mediterranean accompanied by the Altay class oiler Yelnya and escorting three sanctioned military cargo vessels: Lady R, Lady D and the Maia-1.
