= Konstantin Kabantsov =

Russian naval officer (born 1968)

Konstantin Petrovich Kabantsov
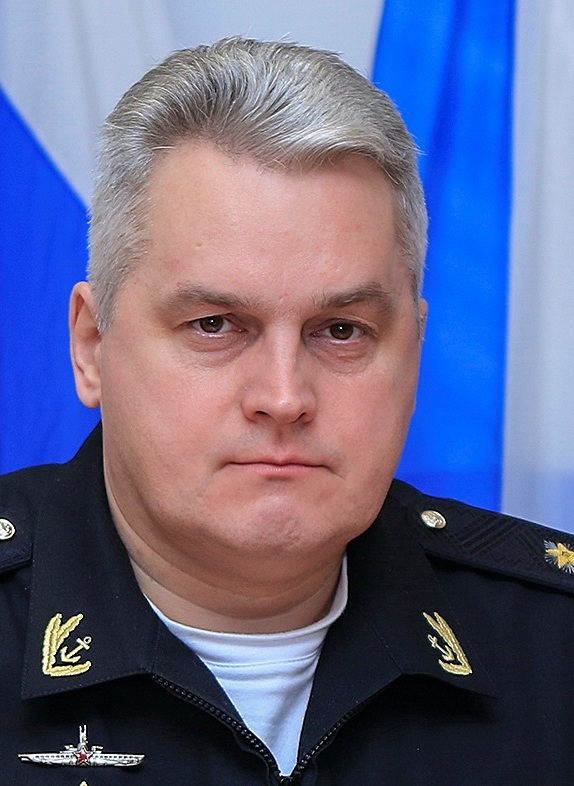
- Born: 12 October 1968 (age 57); Semipalatinsk, Kazakh SSR, USSR
- Allegiance: Soviet Union; Russia
- Branch: Soviet Navy; Russian Navy
- Service years: 1985-present
- Rank: Vice-Admiral
- Commands: Gepard; 24th Submarine Division; White Sea Naval Base; Primorsky Flotilla; Northern Fleet
- Awards: Order of Military Merit; Order of Naval Merit

Konstantin Petrovich Kabantsov (Russian: Константин Петрович Кабанцов; born 12 October 1968) is an officer of the Russian Navy. He currently holds the rank of Vice-Admiral, and has been commander in chief of the Northern Fleet since 2024.

== Biography ==
Kabantsov was born on 12 October 1968 in Semipalatinsk, now Semey, in what was then the Kazakh Soviet Socialist Republic, in the Soviet Union. He entered the Soviet Navy, studying at the M. V. Frunze Higher Naval School in Leningrad and graduating in 1990. He was assigned to the Northern Fleet, where he served aboard nuclear submarines, rising through the positions of combat unit commander, assistant commander, and finally senior assistant commander of a submarine by 2003. In preparation for service at higher ranks, he had completed the Higher Special Officer Classes of the Navy in 1995. In April 2003 he was appointed to command the Akula-class submarine Gepard.

In 2006, Kabantsov was appointed deputy commander of the Northern Fleet's 24th Submarine Division, and after graduating from the Kuznetsov Naval Academy in 2007, he was appointed chief of staff and deputy commander, and then commander of the division in 2016. In March 2009 he was nominated as a candidate for deputy of the Council of Deputies of the closed city of Aleksandrovsk. As part of his posting he served as deputy commander of the Northern Fleet's submarine forces between 2013 and 2016. He then undertook further studies at the Military Academy of the General Staff, graduating in 2018 and being appointed commander of the Northern Fleet's White Sea Naval Base. In 2020, he became commander of the Pacific Fleet's Primorsky Flotilla, before being, on 21 October 2021, appointed chief of staff and first deputy commander of the Northern Fleet. He officially took up his duties on 6 November that year.

Kabantsov was promoted to the rank of vice admiral on 17 February 2023 and on 21 March 2024 became acting commander of the Northern Fleet, following the appointment of its commander, Admiral Aleksandr Moiseyev as Commander-in-Chief of the Russian Navy. Kabantsov was confirmed as commander of the Northern Fleet by Minister of Defence Sergei Shoigu on 2 April.

== Honours and awards ==
Over his career Kabantsov has received the Orders of Military Merit, Naval Merit and various medals.
