= Semyon Lobov =

Semyon Lobov may refer to:

- Semyon Lobov (admiral)
- Semyon Lobov (politician)
