= Vladimir Kasatonov =

Soviet military leader and fleet admiral

Vladimir Afanasyevich Kasatonov
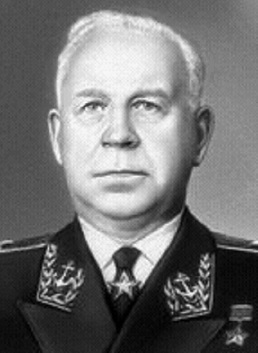
- Born: July 21, 1910; Petergof, Russia
- Died: 9 June 1989 (aged 78) Moscow
- Allegiance: Soviet Union
- Branch: Soviet Navy
- Service years: 1927–1989
- Rank: Fleet Admiral
- Commands: Baltic Fleet, Black Sea Fleet, Northern Fleet
- Conflicts: World War II
- Awards: Hero of the Soviet Union

Vladimir Afanasyevich Kasatonov (Russian: Владимир Афанасьевич Касатонов; 21 July 1910 – 9 June 1989) was a Soviet military leader, fleet admiral, and Hero of the Soviet Union.

Kasatonov finished the M.V. Frunze Higher Naval School in 1931 and served in the Baltic Fleet as a submariner. During the early part of World War II he was Chief of Staff of the Baltic Fleet's submarine division. Later in the war he joined the Naval General Staff, Operations Division.

In 1949 he was Deputy Commander of the Pacific Fleet, in 1953 he was Commander of the Baltic Fleet and in 1955 he became Commander of the Black Sea Fleet. In 1962 he became Commander of the Northern Fleet. In 1964 he became Deputy Commander-in-Chief of the Soviet Navy.

In 1974 Kasatonov became a member of the Chief Inspectorate of the Ministry of Defense and served in the Supreme Soviet. He died in Moscow and is buried in the Novodevichy Cemetery.

Vladimir Kasatonov's son, Igor Vladimirovich Kasatonov followed in his father's footsteps, holding virtually all of his father's positions. He retired as 1st Deputy Commander-in-Chief of the Russian Navy. His grandson Vladimir Lvovich Kasatonov serves as Deputy Commander-in-Chief of Russian Navy since 2019.

The Russian frigate Admiral Kasatonov is named after him.

== Honours and awards ==
- Hero of the Soviet Union (25 November 1966)
- Order of Lenin, three times (1953, 20 July 1960 and 25 November 1966)
- Order of the Red Banner, twice (1947 and 1972)
- Order of the October Revolution (18 July 1980)
- Order of Nakhimov, 2nd class (8 July 1945)
- Order of the Patriotic War, 1st class, twice (1946 and 11 March 1985)
- Order of the Red Banner of Labour, twice (1963 and 20 July 1970)
- Order of the Red Star, twice (1943 and 3 November 1944)
- Order "For Service to the Homeland in the Armed Forces of the USSR", 3rd class
- Order of the Red Banner of Mongolia
- campaign and jubilee medals
