= Viktor Bursuk =

Russian naval officer

Viktor Iosifovich Bursuk
- Born: 9 April 1958 (age 68); Stalino, Ukrainian SSR, USSR
- Allegiance: Soviet Union; Russia
- Branch: Soviet Navy; Russian Navy
- Service years: 1975–2019
- Rank: Vice-Admiral
- Awards: Order of Military Merit; Order of Naval Merit; Medal "For Battle Merit"; Medal "For Impeccable Service" Second and Third classes State Prize of the Russian Federation

Viktor Iosifovich Bursuk (Russian: Виктор Иосифович Бурсук; born 9 April 1958) is a retired officer of the Russian Navy. He currently holds the rank of vice-admiral, and was a deputy commander-in-chief of the navy.
