= Russian frigate Admiral Kasatonov =

Admiral Gorshkov-class frigate

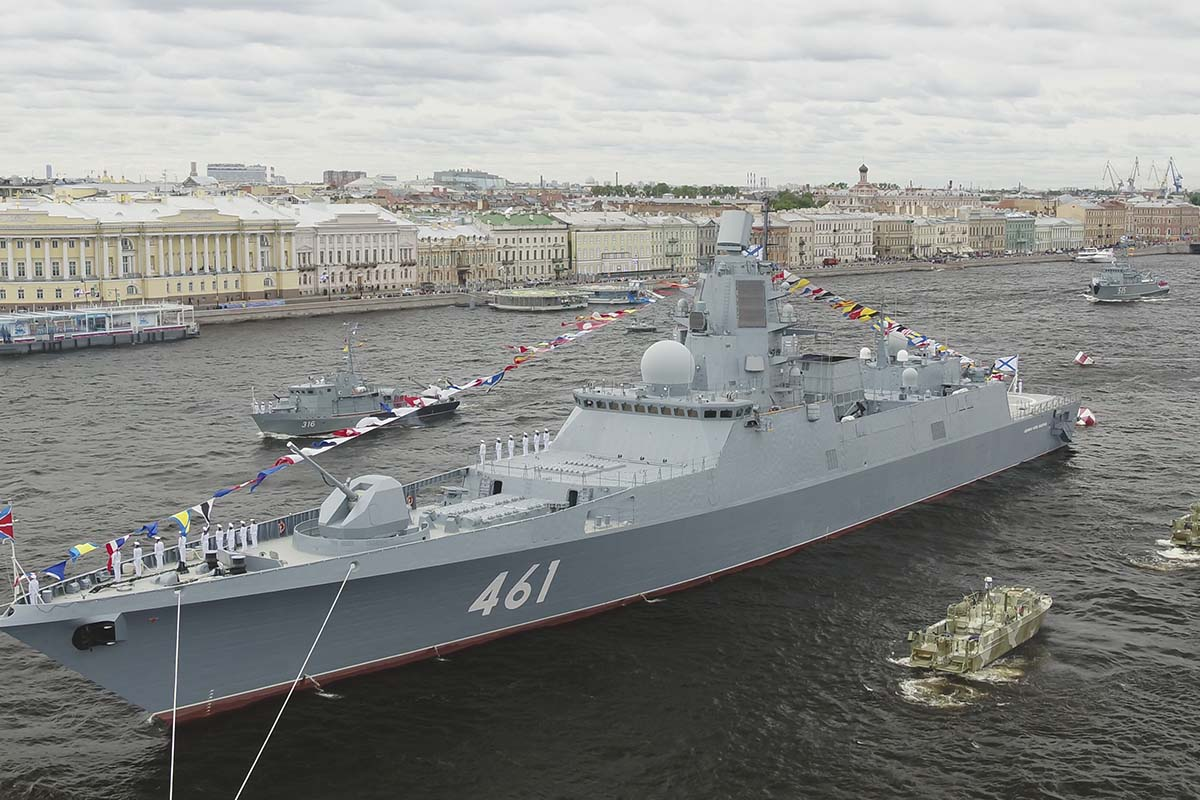
- Admiral Flota Kasatonov in 2021

History

Russia
- Name: Admiral Flota Kasatonov
- Namesake: Vladimir Kasatonov
- Builder: Severnaya Verf, Saint Petersburg
- Laid down: 26 November 2009
- Launched: 12 December 2014
- Commissioned: 21 July 2020
- Status: Active

General characteristics
- Class & type: Admiral Gorshkov-class frigate
- Displacement: 4,500 tons
- Length: 135 m (442 ft 11 in)
- Beam: 16 m (52 ft 6 in)
- Draft: 4.5 m (14 ft 9 in)
- Propulsion: COGAG, 2 cruise gas turbines, 2 boost gas turbines, 2 shafts
- Speed: 29.5 knots (54.6 km/h)
- Range: 4,000 nmi (7,400 km) at 14 kn (26 km/h)
- Complement: 210
- Electronic warfare & decoys: EW suite: Prosvet-M; Countermeasures: 2 × PU KT-308; 8 × PU KT-216; 2 × 5P-42 Filin
- Armament: 1 × 130 mm Amethyst/Arsenal A-192M naval gun; 16 (2 × 8) UKSK VLS cells for Kalibr, Oniks or Zircon anti-ship cruise missiles; 32 (2 × 16) Redut VLS cells for 9M96, 9M96M, 9M96D/9M96DM(M2) and/or quad-packed 9M100 surface-to-air missiles; 2 × Palash CIWS; 2 × 4 330 mm torpedo tubes for Paket-NK anti-torpedo/anti-submarine torpedoes; 2 × 14.5 mm MTPU pedestal machine guns
- Aircraft carried: 1 × Ka-27 series helicopter
- Aviation facilities: Helipad and hangar for one helicopter

Admiral Flota Kasatonov (Russian: Адмирал флота Касатонов) is an Admiral Gorshkov-class frigate of the Russian Navy and the second ship of the class.

== Design ==
The Admiral Gorshkov class is the successor to the Neustrashimy and Krivak-class frigates. Unlike their Soviet-era predecessors, the new ships are designed for multiple roles. They are to be capable to execute long-range strikes, conduct anti-submarine warfare and to carry out escort missions.

== Construction and service ==
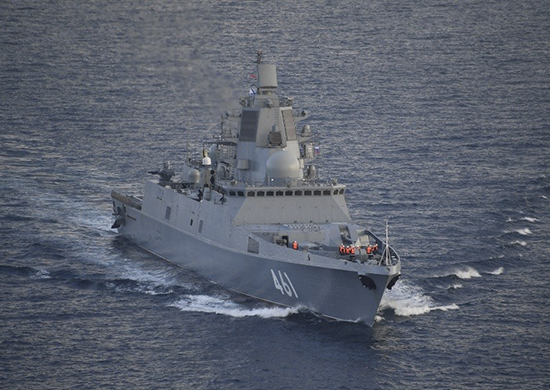
The frigate Admiral of the Fleet Kasatonov in service.

Admiral Kasatonov was laid down on 26 November 2009 at Severnaya Verf, was launched on 12 December 2014, and commissioned on 21 July 2020. The ship is named after Hero of the Soviet Union Fleet Admiral Vladimir Kasatonov. Admiral Kasatonov is assigned to the 43rd Missile Ship Division of the Russian Northern Fleet at Severomorsk. In 2020, the previous hull number 431 was replaced by 461.

Following her commissioning, the ship conducted anti-submarine exercises in the Barents Sea and, on 29 September 2020, fired a Kalibr cruise missile from the White Sea against a ground target located at a training range in the Arkhangelsk region. Between 2019 and 2020 she tested a new anti-submarine weapon system "Otvet".

=== 2021 ===
Admiral Kasatonov left her homeport of Severomorsk for her maiden distant deployment on 30 December 2020 along with tug Nikolay Chiker under the command of the Captain 1st rank Vladimir Malakhovsky. On 14 January 2021, the ship entered the Mediterranean Sea through the Strait of Gibraltar. On 18 January 2021, she paid a visit to Algeria. On 26 January 2021, the accompanying tug Nikolay Chiker visited Limassol, Cyprus. Both ships visited the Greek port of Piraeus on 3 February 2021 and, between 16 and 18 February 2021, the Egyptian port of Alexandria. In February 2021, the tanker Vyazma joined the ship detachment. Between 2–4 March, Admiral Kasatonov visited the Turkish naval base at Aksaz. Between 2–5 March, Nikolay Chiker and Vyazma called at Limassol again, and between 8–10 March, Admiral Kasatonov did too. She also called at Tartus, Syria.

On 15 March, the ship was monitoring the French amphibious assault ship Tonnerre, which had been approaching Cyprus from the direction of Crete. The American carrier strike group of USS Dwight D. Eisenhower had also been active in the area, after exercises with the Greek Navy on 11 March. From 23 to 26 March, the ship returned to Piraeus to participate in commemorations for the 200th anniversary of Greek independence (Celebration of 25th of March 1821). On 2 April, the ship detachment transited the Gibraltar strait westwards.

On 23 April, Admiral Kasatonov returned to Severomorsk, being greeted by the commander of the Russian Navy Nikolay Yevmenov, and the commander of the Northern Fleet, Aleksandr Moyseev. Nikolay Chiker and Vyazma had returned to base the prior week.

=== 2022 ===
On 7 February 2022, the frigate deployed to the Mediterranean Sea along with the destroyer Vice-Admiral Kulakov, cruiser Marshal Ustinov and tanker Vyazma, strengthening the permanent task force there. The ship was denied access to the Black Sea after Turkey closed the Turkish Straits to all foreign warships. The battle group left the Mediterranean on 24 August 2022, returning to the Severomorsk, while Admiral Kasatonov stayed in the Mediterranean.

In late November, she was absent from Tartus, likely shadowing the French aircraft carrier Charles de Gaulle, deployed to the East Mediterranean.

=== 2023 ===
In early 2023, Admiral Kasatonov departed the Mediterranean to return to Severomorsk, accompanied by the tanker Akademik Pashin. The ship detachment returned on 23 March. Afterwards, she held anti-submarine warfare drills in the Norvegian Sea on 10 April. On 1 November, she returned from maintenance in Severodvinsk to her permanent base Severomorsk.

=== 2026 ===
The frigate remained active engaging in training exercises as of February 2026, and as of April 2026 was reported escorting Russian shadow fleet tankers in the vicinity of the United Kingdom. As of May 2026, the frigate was operating in the Mediterranean, accompanying shadow fleet vessels with a declared destination of Port Said in Egypt, but with a rumoured actual intent to resupply the former Russian naval facility in Tartus, Syria. As of June 2026, the frigate was confirmed to be docked at Tartus, together with the replenishment vessel Academic Pashin, a Grachonok-class patrol boat and two Raptor-class patrol boats.

In August, the frigate was reported to be escorting the LNG carrier Portovyy en route along the Norwegian coast from the Baltic Sea towards Murmansk.
