= Oleg Yerofeyev =

Soviet and Russian navy admiral (1940–2022)

Admiral Oleg Aleksandrovich Yerofeyev
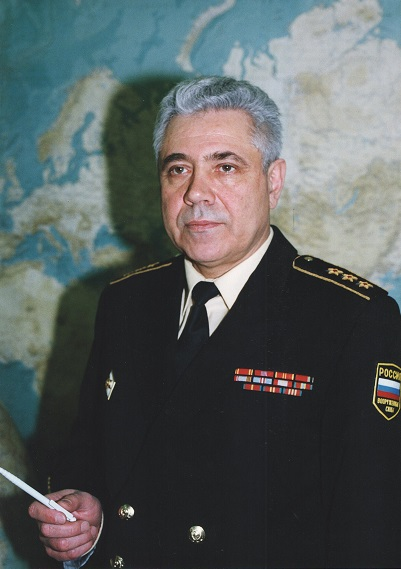
- Born: 10 July 1940; Petropavlovsk-Kamchatsky, Russian SFSR, Soviet Union
- Died: 24 December 2022 (aged 82); Moscow, Russia
- Military career
- Allegiance: USSR; Russia
- Branch: Soviet Navy; Russian Navy
- Service years: 1957–1999
- Commands: Northern Fleet

Oleg Aleksandrovich Yerofeyev (Russian: Олег Александрович Ерофеев; 10 July 1940 – 24 December 2022) was an admiral of the Soviet and Russian Navies, and commanded the Northern Fleet from 1992 to 1999.

== Honours and awards ==
- Order of Lenin
- Order of the October Revolution
- Order of Military Merit
