= Northern Fleet =

Military unit of Russia

Coordinates: 71°22′2″N 24°34′3″E

- Russian: Северный флот Severnyy flot
- Northern Fleet's emblem
- Founded: June 1, 1733; Soviet iteration: August 5, 1933
- Country: Russia
- Branch: Russian Navy
- Type: Fleet
- Role: Nuclear deterrence; Naval warfare; Amphibious military operations; Combat patrols in the Arctic/Atlantic; Naval presence/diplomacy missions in the Atlantic and elsewhere
- Size: As of 2026: c. 36-39 submarines; c. 41 surface warships; numerous auxiliaries; 8 nuclear-powered ballistic missile submarines (SSBNs); c. 15 nuclear-powered attack/cruise missile submarines (SSNs/SSGNs - some not operational); c. 3-6 diesel/electric-powered attack submarines (SSKs); c. 10 special operations submarines (under the command of the Main Directorate of Deep-Sea Research); c. 11 major surface combatants (aircraft carrier, battlecruiser, cruiser, destroyers, frigates - aircraft carrier, one battlecruiser & one destroyer not operational); 7 minor surface combatants (light corvettes); 6 major amphibious ships ( of which 3 deployed in the Black Sea and participating in the Russo-Ukraine War; at least one seriously damaged); 10 mine countermeasures vessels; 7 patrol vessels; numerous support ships/auxiliaries
- Part of: Russian Navy
- Garrison/HQ: Severomorsk (HQ); Polyarnyy; Olenya Bay; Gadzhiyevo (Yagelnaya/Sayda); Vidyayevo (Ura Bay and Ara Bay); Bolshaya Lopatka (Litsa Guba); Gremikha
- Anniversaries: May 11th
- Engagements: World War II
- Decorations: Order of the Red Banner

Commanders
- Current commander: Vice-Adm. Konstantin Kabantsov
- Notable commanders: Adm. Vladimir Vysotskiy; Adm. Feliks Gromov; Adm. Ivan Kapitanets; Adm. Vladimir Chernavin; Adm. Semyon Lobov; Adm. Vladimir Kasatonov; Adm. Arseniy Golovko

Insignia
- Ensign

External videos
- on RT Documentary official YouTube channel (in English)
- Submarines of the Northern Fleet: The Beast Division – Part 1 on YouTube
- Submarines of the Northern Fleet: Beast Division – Part 2 on YouTube

The Northern Fleet (Russian: Северный флот, Severnyy flot) is the fleet of the Russian Navy in the Arctic.

According to the Russian ministry of defence: "The Northern Fleet dates its history back to a squadron created in 1733 to protect the territories of the Russian Empire, sea trade routes and fisheries in the White Sea near the coast of the Kola Peninsula. The order of the Commander-in-Chief of the Russian Navy of 25 May 2014 determined 1733 as the year of foundation of the Northern Fleet, and June 1 as its annual holiday".

In its modern iteration, the Arctic Ocean Flotilla of the former Imperial Navy evolved into a full fleet of the Soviet Navy in 1933 as the Northern Flotilla. After being awarded the Order of the Red Banner in 1965, it was officially known as the Red Banner Northern Fleet. During the Soviet era the Northern Fleet operated more than 200 submarines, ranging from diesel-electric to nuclear-powered ballistic missile classes.

On 1 December 2014 the fleet became the core element of the newly established Northern Fleet Joint Strategic Command, including all Russian armed forces located in Murmansk and Arkhangelsk Oblasts and on Russia's offshore islands along its Arctic coast. It is co-equal in status with Russia's Military Districts. The Northern Fleet is tasked with responsibility for operations and defense in the Arctic seas along Northern Russia, including the Barents Sea and Kara Sea, as well as the northwestern maritime approaches to Russia including the Norwegian Sea and Atlantic Ocean.

The Northern Fleet's headquarters and main base are located in Severomorsk, Murmansk Oblast, with secondary bases elsewhere in the greater Kola Bay area. The current commander is Vice-Admiral Konstantin Kabantsov, who was appointed to the position in April 2024. In June 2020, Russian President Vladimir Putin signed an executive order making the Northern Fleet an independent military-administrative entity, effective January 1, 2021. That status was abolished on February 26, 2024 by a new presidential decree (effective since March 1, 2024) and fleet came under the direct command of the Russian Navy senior command.

== History ==
=== Origins ===
The origins of the Northern Fleet can be traced to the interest of Peter the Great in the only Russian seaport available during the late 17th century, Arkhangelsk. In 1693, the Tsar personally visited, worked and lived at Arkhangelsk laying down and building a 24-gun frigate, Saint Paul. The explorer Vitus Bering was subsequently hired and tasked to search for a route to America from Kamchatka.

Later, Empress Anna put Bering in charge of the five Great Northern Expeditions, from 1733 to 1742. Thousands of kilometers of the coast from the White Sea to Anadyr were mapped for the first time.

=== Arctic Sea Flotilla and White Sea Flotilla ===
In July 1916, the Imperial Russian Navy formed the Arctic Ocean Flotilla (Флотилия Северного Ледовитого океана, or Flotiliya Severnogo Ledovitogo okeana) during World War I to safeguard transportation routes of Allied ships through the Barents Sea from the Kaiserliche Marine of the German Empire. The Flotilla was formally an extension of the Baltic Fleet. After the October Revolution and the collapse of the Russian Empire in 1917, allied forces intervened in northern Russia and occupied both Archangel and Murmansk in the spring/summer of 1918. The military intervention lasted until late 1919 when allied forces withdrew and White Russian forces were defeated.

With the Bolshevik victory, the Red Fleet (later the Soviet Navy) replaced the units of the former Imperial Russian Navy and formed the White Sea Flotilla (Беломорская флотилия, Belomorskaya flotiliya) in March 1920, based in Arkhangelsk. The White Sea Flotilla replaced the Arctic Sea Flotilla and was renamed as the Naval Forces of the North Sea, but was later disbanded in January 1923.

=== Soviet Navy ===
==== Northern Flotilla ====
The Northern Flotilla was formed on August 5, 1933, by transferring patrol boats Smerch and Uragan, D-class submarines Dekabrist (D-1) and Narodovolyets (D-2) and two destroyers from the Baltic Fleet to Northern Russia. These ships departed from Kronstadt on 18 May 1933 and arrived at Murmansk on 5 August. Another destroyer, another patrol boat, another submarine, and two minesweepers joined the flotilla at Soroka in September 1933. Polyarny became the flotilla's main base, and a flight of MBR-2 flying boats joined the unit at Murmansk in September 1935.

The Northern Flotilla was quickly expanded in the years after it was formed, receiving new ships, airfields, coastal and air defence artillery. On May 11, 1937, the fleet entered its current form when it was renamed to the Northern Fleet (Северный флот, Severnyy flot).

Like all elements in Soviet society, the navy was decimated by the Stalin purges of the 1930s. At least 30 percent of the Soviet Army and Navy officer corps, including three of the four fleet commanders, were arrested and shot or sent to the gulags. This included a commander of the Northern Fleet, Konstantin Dushenov, who was shot in 1940. The purges are said to have "had a catastrophic effect on the Red Army’s ability to perform in the early stages of World War II".

==== World War II ====
The Northern Fleet blocked the Finnish military base at Petsamo through the Winter War of 1939 and 1940.

In August 1940, the Soviets created the White Sea Military Base to defend the coastline, bases, ports, and other installations. The White Sea Flotilla was established in August 1941 under the command of Rear-Admiral M. Dolinin. Subsequent commanders were Vice Admiral Georgy Stepanov (in October), Rear-Admiral Stepan Kucherov, and Vice-Admiral Yuriy Panteleyev.

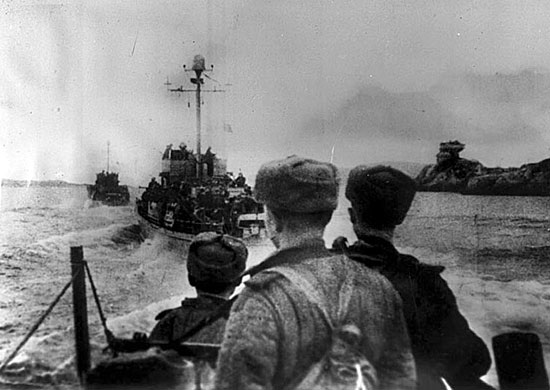
A Soviet landing party heading for Kirkenes, Norway

By June 1941, the fleet included 8 destroyers, 7 escorts, 15 submarines, 15 patrol boats, 2 minesweepers and 116 airplanes. However, at least half the aircraft were considered obsolete. During the German-Soviet War of 1941 to 1945, the Northern Fleet defended the coastlines of the Rybachy and Sredny peninsulas, secured internal and external transportation routes, and provided support to the maritime flank of the 14th Army. Naval Infantry and up to 10,000 Northern Fleet personnel participated in land warfare including the Petsamo-Kirkenes Operation of 1944. Northern Fleet Naval Infantry units caused tens of thousands of German casualties fighting during the Moscow, Leningrad, Stalingrad, and North Caucasus campaigns.

In official Soviet history, the Northern Fleet's role in defending the Murmansk region was emphasized. While the United Kingdom and the United States were described as temporarily providing HMS Royal Sovereign and USS Milwaukee to the USSR (in exchange for the Italian ships captured during the war and destined to be divided among the allies), the Northern Fleet was said to have secured safe passage for 1,463 ships in external convoys and 2,568 ships in internal convoys. Morover, its submarines, torpedo boats, and aviation sank 192 enemy transport ships and 70 other hostile military ships while damaging 118 another transport, military, and auxiliary ships. In this regard, Soviet submarine K-21, under the command of Captain Nikolai Lunin, was said to have attacked the German battleship Tirpitz at 71° 22' 2"N, 24° 34' 3"E. While the К-21 logbook reports observation of two torpedo explosions, no damage is reported by German sources.

Ships were lost fighting against unequal odds. Patrol boat Tuman, a former trawler, was sunk by three Kriegsmarine destroyers at the entrance to Kola Bay on August 4, 1941. The icebreaker Sibiryakov was sunk on August 25, 1942 by the German pocket battleship Admiral Scheer while defending two convoys. The patrol ship Brilliant (formerly trawler Murmany) was sunk by a submarine.

However, as argued by former Soviet naval officer Nicholas Shadrin, the general weakness of Soviet naval forces in the Arctic necessitated a heavy reliance on allied support. While Soviet naval forces were tasked with supporting the army and local merchant shipping, the strategically vital task of ensuring the safe arrival of supply convoys in the Soviet Union largely had to be provided by allied naval forces.

In the course of the war, the Northern Fleet received the following awards:

- Two airborne regiments, a squadron of submarine hunters, eight submarines, and the destroyer Гремящий (Gremyaschiy, or "Rattler") were awarded "Soviet Guards" status.
- Many formations, units, and ships were awarded with Order honors.
- Eighty-five sailors of the Northern Fleet received the title of the Hero of the Soviet Union (with three of them receiving the award twice).
- More than a total of 48,000 men were awarded medals.

==== Cold War ====
The White Sea Flotilla was reestablished under the fleet in December 1945 and the White Sea Naval Base in December 1956.

The Northern Fleet was considered secondary to the Baltic and Black sea fleets until operational responsibility for the Atlantic Ocean was shifted in the 1950s because of more direct access. In September 1955, the Soviet navy became the first to launch a ballistic missile from a submarine. In June 1956, Northern Fleet Zulu-class submarine, (NATO designation Zulu IV 1/2) “Б-67” (B-67) became the first to carry ballistic missiles.

The 2nd Cruiser Division was formed on 31 May 1956 at Severomorsk, Murmansk Oblast. Its ships included the Sverdlov-class cruisers (Project 68) Murmansk, Aleksandr Nevskiy, and Molotovsk, and the 121st Destroyer Brigade, with 11 Gnevny, Ognevoy, and Skory-class destroyers. On 5 June 1969, the division was reorganised with the 170th Destroyer Brigade (8 Project 56 destroyers) and the 10th Anti-Submarine Warfare Brigade (10 Project 42 and 50 ASW vessels). On 1 April 1961, the division was renamed the 2nd Anti-Submarine Warfare Division.

On 1 July 1958, the Northern Fleet raised the Soviet Navy ensign over the first Soviet nuclear submarine, K-3 Leninskiy Komsomol. Following the 1958 voyage of USS Nautilus, the Leninskiy Komsomol (named for Vladimir Lenin's Komsomol) traveled under the Arctic ice and surfaced at the North Pole on 17 July 1962. Russian submarines have visited the North Pole region more than 300 times since then. Two nuclear submarines of the Northern Fleet made a journey under the Arctic ice cap and reached the Pacific Fleet for the first time in history in September 1963.

More than 25 Soviet submarines did the same in the following years. The Northern Fleet was awarded the Order of the Red Banner on 7 May 1965. Two Northern Fleet submarines made a 25,000-nautical-mile (46,000 km; 29,000 mi) journey "around the world" (actually only between the Kola Gulf and the base at Petropavlovsk-Kamchatskiy around South America) without surfacing in 1966. The Northern Fleet had almost 50% of the Soviet Navy's submarines by 1986.

From 1968 to 30 November 2005, the 7th Operational Squadron was the main Atlantic operational force of the fleet. The Museum of the Air Forces of the Northern Fleet was opened on 20 August 1976, in the closed settlement of Safonovo, Murmansk Oblast. Aircraft carriers began entering service with the Fleet in the 1970s. The lead unit of the Kiev class of heavy aircraft-carrying cruisers, Kiev, became operational in 1977, and Admiral Gorshkov was commissioned in 1987. Large nuclear-powered missile-carrying cruisers, the Kirov-class battlecruiser and Kalinin, also entered service from 1980. Fortification of the southern reaches of the Barents Sea during the 1980s marked a Soviet naval strategy shift to an emphasis on bastion defense. Russia has continued to employ that strategy.

In 1982, the 175th independent Naval Infantry Brigade was formed at Tumannyy, in Murmansk Oblast.

In 1990, the 88th Separate Fighter Bomber Regiment, along with the rest of the 36th Air Army, was pulled out of Hungary along with the rest of the Southern Group of Forces. In order to save the unit, which had a distinguished history, from being disbanded under the Treaty on Conventional Armed Forces in Europe, defence minister Marshal Dmitry Yazov transferred it to the Northern Fleet, which was not subject to the provisions of the treaty. In May 1990 the aircraft and personnel were moved to Olen'ya Airbase, near Olenegorsk, Murmansk Oblast where they operated in support of the Soviet Navy.

In May 1994, after the Russian Ministry of Defence had ordered the retirement of the MiG-23/27 family, the unit was re-equipped with the Sukhoi Su-25 and its aircraft were allowed to deteriorate, being stripped for scrap by the locals. It was then renamed the 88th Independent Shipboard Attack Air Regiment.

=== Russian Navy ===
The area of Joint Strategic Command Northern Fleet as for 2014-12-15

An analysis of the Northern Fleet produced by Chatham House in the UK notes that: "After the fall of the Soviet Union, the Kremlin paid little attention to the Arctic. During the 1990s, the Russian Arctic was at best considered a burden fraught with socio-economic problems. Little was done there until an 'Arctic revival' began in the 2000s, focused on reinvesting in a region that had previously been abandoned for more than 15 years".

Units were disbanded in the 1990s including the 6th and 3rd Submarine divisions in addition to aviation units. Previous units also included the 1st Submarine Flotilla, and the 7th Submarine Division of nuclear attack submarines. In 1989 the Soviet Navy had nearly 200 nuclear submarines in operation of which two-thirds were said to belong to the Northern Fleet. By 1996, only half were still in service.

The 57th Naval Missile Aviation Division of Tu-22s and electronic warfare Tu-16s from the Baltic Fleet at Bykhov, Mogilev Oblast, in the Byelorussian SSR transferred to the Northern Fleet in December 1991 as the 57th Combined Ship Aviation Division. The division commanded the 830th and 38th Shipborne Anti-Submarine Helicopter Regiments and the 279th Shipborne Fighter Aviation Regiment from Severomorsk-3 in Murmansk Oblast until disbanded on 1 May 1998.

The 5th Naval Missile Aviation Division commanding the 524th and 574th Naval Missile Aviation Regiments. The 574th Regiment was based at Lakhta air base (Katunino), until disbanded in 2002. The 100th Independent Shipborne Fighter Aviation Regiment (in February 1993) and its personnel and equipment absorbed by the 279th Shipborne Fighter Aviation Regiment.

On 12 August 2000, the Kursk submarine disaster gained international attention when the Oscar-class submarine Kursk of the Northern Fleet perished in a torpedo accident during exercises in the Barents Sea near Murmansk Oblast, resulting in the deaths of 118 sailors.

Beginning in the early 2000s, however, a renewed emphasis was placed on modernizing the Russian Navy, including the Northern Fleet. As argued in the Chatham House analysis: "Moscow's intentions for the Arctic are not Arctic-specific, but are related to the Kremlin's global ambitions for reviving Russia as a great power. Russia's force posture in the Arctic is informed by the changing geopolitical environment around its strained relations with the West".

In January 2016, Defence Minister Sergey Shoygu announced that the 45th Air and Air Defence Forces Army had been formed under control of the Northern Fleet in December 2015. Its territorial control center assumed combat duty in July 2018. For a time the Northern Fleet Joint Strategic Command also incorporated the 14th Army Corps under its command and maintained equal status to the other military districts of the Russian Armed Forces. Its jurisdiction was primarily within the northern region of European Russia and the Arctic Ocean. However, in 2024 with the entry of Finland into NATO, the Fleet's role was refocused on maritime operations with the 14th Army Corps being placed under the direct command of Russian Ground Forces and the Leningrad Military District, while the fleet itself was made subordinate to the general command of the Russian Navy.

The Northern Fleet includes about two-thirds of all the Russian Navy's nuclear-powered ships. The flagship Kirov-class battlecruiser Pyotr Velikiy is named after Peter the Great. The Fleet staged a series of major Barents Sea exercises in January 2004 involving thirteen ships and seven submarines including Pyotr Velikiy, Admiral Kuznetsov, with President Vladimir Putin was aboard the Typhoon class ballistic missile submarine Arkhangelsk. The exercise was marred by two RSM-54 SLBM launch failures aboard Novomoskovsk and Kareliya.

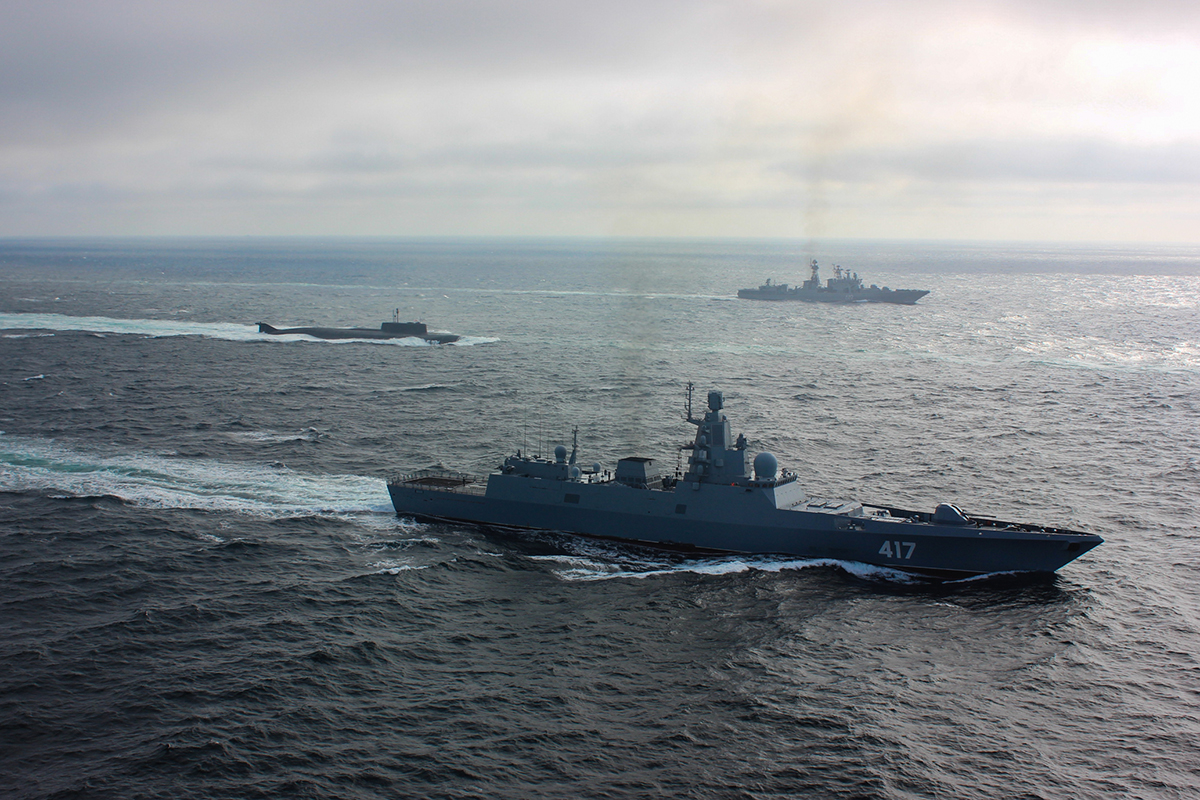
The Northern Fleet ships Admiral Gorshkov (foreground), Severomorsk, and submarine Orel, 2018

Submarines have traditionally been the strongest component of the Northern Fleet. Several new classes of submarines are in production to replace older models including: Borei/Dolgorukiy-class SSBNs, Yasen-class SSGNs, Khabarovsk-class SSGNs and Lada-class conventionally-powered submarines. However, the existing nuclear-powered submarines of the Northern Fleet are also aging rapidly. It is currently unclear whether the new Yasen-class, and other potential follow-on models, can be produced in sufficient numbers, and on a timely basis, to replace aging older nuclear submarines on a one-for-one basis. In this regard, reports suggest that Russian third-generation nuclear submarines have not been modernized to a level to avoid block obsolescence before 2030.

The Northern Fleet has also received attention with respect to technological upgrades. In 2025 it was reported that Russia has likely deployed a network of sonar systems in the Barents Sea to detect submarines. The network, known as "Harmony", is reported to be composed of detection devices arrayed in an arc stretching from Murmansk, via Novaya Zemlja to Franz Josef Land.

With respect to aviation, the fleet has received new combat aircraft (deployed within the 45th Air and Air Defence Army), enhanced shore-based missile assets (both surface-to-surface and surface-to-air) as well as new systems such as the Samarkand electronic warfare systems in 2017 and the Barnaul-T air reconnaissance system in December 2021. Samarkand is designed to assess electromagnetic situation, search, detect and analyze radio emissions and Barnaul-T helps conduct reconnaissance round-the-clock. Russia's Northern Fleet in 2018 resumed regular air patrols of the Arctic by long-range anti-submarine aircraft and its share of modern samples of weapons and equipment exceeded 56 percent. An air defense regiment of the Northern fleet armed with S-400 SAM launchers went on combat duty in Novaya Zemlya in the September 2019.

While the Northern Fleet has traditionally emphasized the deployment of larger warships and submarines, new missile boats (of the Buyan/M and Karakurt classes) have temporarily been able to deploy into Northern Fleet waters utilizing Russian internal waterways. In 2020, the Buyan-M class corvette Zelenyy Dol and the Karakurt-class corvette Odintsovo trained and conducted trials in Arctic waters having deployed to northern waters via the internal waterways. The deployment illustrated the Russian capacity to reinforce the Northern Fleet with cruise missile-armed light units, potentially drawn from the Russian Navy's two other western fleets (the Black Sea Fleet and the Baltic Fleet) or from the Caspian Flotilla. In 2021, the Karakurt-class corvette Sovetsk also made the transit from the Baltic to the White Sea for missile exercises.

Together with the Baltic and Black Sea Fleets, the Northern Fleet has also played a key role in sustaining the Russian navy's Mediterranean Sea Task Force. In August 2022, Italian Navy sources reported the detection of a nuclear submarine, reported to be the Yasen-class submarine Severodvinsk, submerged in the Mediterranean Sea to the south of Sicily, making it the first Russian nuclear submarine in the Mediterranean since Kursk and Tomsk in 1999. Since the closure of the Turkish Straits at the start of the Russo-Ukraine War in 2022, the Northern Fleet's role in helping to sustain the Mediterranean Sea Task Force has become that much more critical.

In late 2021 it was reported that the Russian Navy was considering the possible creation of a new fleet, termed the Arctic Fleet, which would be oriented to employing "ships and special equipment suitable for the Arctic". The Northern and Pacific fleets would continue to focus on "combat missions". If established, it was envisaged that the Arctic Fleet would maintain infrastructure separate from the Northern and Pacific fleets.

In July 2026, Russian Navy Commander-in-Chief Admiral Alexander Moiseyev stated that the first unmanned systems regiment had been formed in the Northern Fleet and that four additional regiments would also be formed over the course of the year. He claimed that a similar structure would also be adopted in the Pacific Fleet in 2027.

== Sites ==
A map of naval bases, shipyards and spent fuel storage sites operated by the Northern Fleet

The Northern Fleet's main base is Severomorsk. There are six more naval bases at Polyarnyy, Olenya Bay, Gadzhiyevo (Yagelnaya/Sayda), Vidyayevo (Ura Bay and Ara Bay), Bolshaya Lopatka (Litsa Guba), and Gremikha. Civilian Arktika nuclear-powered icebreakers are based at Murmansk. Shipyards are located in Murmansk, Severodvinsk, Roslyakovo, Polyarnyy, Nerpa, and Malaya Lopatka. Spent fuel storage sites include Murmansk, Gremikha, Severodvinsk and Andreyeva Bay.

== HQ Band ==
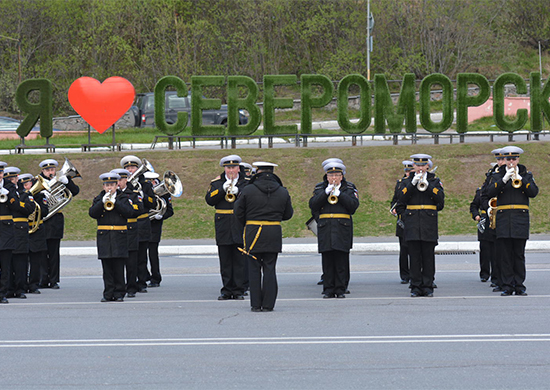
The band in May 2017

The Military Band of the Northern Fleet (Russian: Военный оркестр Северного флота) is a military band unit of the Russian Armed Forces that is a branch of the Military Band Service of the Armed Forces of Russia. It is based at the fleet HQ in Severomorsk. The band also takes part in national events and holidays in Russia such as the Victory Day and Defender of the Fatherland Day holidays as well as the Navy Day fleet parade. It has taken part in the ceremonial arrival of ships to the Northern Fleet Headquarters including the Vice-Admiral Kulakov and the USS Nicholas.

It had taken part in the funerals of many of the victims of the Kursk submarine disaster in the fall of 2000. In mid-March 2018, it took part in a competition at the Murmansk Nakhimov Naval School, which was presided by Colonel Timofey Mayakin, the Senior Director of Music of the Russian Armed Forces. In September of that year, the band as well as a band from Tromsø, Norway, where they performed "Norwegian March" and "Farewell of Slavianka" at the Murmansk Regional Philharmonic.

== Order of battle ==
The Northern Fleet comprises the fleet's naval assets as well as the specific naval infantry formations that are assigned to it. In the past it also incorporated the aviation and air defence assets of the 45th Air Force and Air Defence Army. The fleet's previous status as a co-equal command with other Russian military districts was abolished on February 26, 2024 by a new presidential decree (effective since March 1, 2024). All land forces of the fleet (apart from the naval infantry and coastal defence troops) were transferred back to the Ground Forces and Leningrad Military District, while some units of the former 45th Air Force and Air Defence Army were transferred to the 6th Guards Air and Air Defence Forces Army of the Russian Air Force. Remaining naval aviation assets now come under the 7th Composite Aviation Corps of the Northern Fleet. The fleet itself has been subordinated directly to the higher command within the Russian Navy.

In addition to units of the navy, additional capability in Arctic waters is provided by civilian icebreakers operated by the state-owned Rosatom company as well as other companies (Rosmorport, Gazprom Neft) and a Project 21180 vessel built for the Russian Navy. This icebreaker fleet, which includes seven nuclear-powered vessels operated by Rosatom, has been described as "crucial to military access and operations". New nuclear-powered Project 22220 icebreakers (four in service, three more under construction as of 2025), and Project 10510 (one vessel building) icebreaker, have entered service, or are under construction/planned, to augment and replace those in service.

The Navy, in turn, is procuring its own "lightened" class of Project 21180M icebreakers (which are two-thirds the displacement of the existing Project 21180 ship). The first vessel was deployed with the Pacific Fleet in early 2023 with plans for a new Arctic strategy having been formalized under the terms of a presidential executive order in October 2020. The icebreakers are designed to ensure the capacity of year-round navigation along the Northern Sea Route. As of early 2024, the Northern Fleet has formed several new units.

Further patrol capabilities in the Arctic, comprising up to 23 armed patrol vessels of various types, are provided by the Russian Coast Guard.

As of 2025, the Northern Fleet comprises about 41 surface warships (including major surface combatants, light corvettes, mine counter-measures vessels, patrol vessels and amphibious units), though some units (including the aircraft carrier Kuznetsov and some other major surface vessels) are under repair or otherwise not operational. Additional support ships and auxiliaries are also deployed.

The Fleet also includes around 36 to 39 submarines (including ballistic missile submarines, cruise missile submarines, special purpose submarines as well as nuclear and conventional attack submarines). As with the surface fleet, some submarines are not operational; others are in reserve and inactive. Nevertheless, programs to modernize the Russian Navy are continuing with the Northern Fleet traditionally having a priority focus with respect to major combatants.

=== Submarines ===
SSBNs: 31st Submarine Division (Yagelnaya Bay, Sayda Inlet)

- Delta IV-class SSBNs: (Delta IVs reportedly being incrementally withdrawn as Borei-class boats - in the Arctic and the Pacific - enter service and achieve full operational capability)
  - Karelia (K-18) (completed major modernization in 2026)
  - Verkhoturye (K-51) (active as of 2025)
  - Tula (K-114) (active as of 2025)
  - Bryansk (K-117) (completed major refit/upgrade in 2024; active as of 2025)
  - Novomoskovsk (K-407) (active as of 2025)
- Borei-class SSBNs:
  - Yury Dolgorukiy (K-535) (prolonged maintenance/refit started in 2024)
  - Knyaz Vladimir (K-549) (active as of 2026)
  - Knyaz Pozharskiy (K-555) (active as of 2025)

SSGNs: 11th Division, Zaozersk

- Oscar II-class SSGNs:
  - Orel (K-266) (active as of 2026)
  - Smolensk (K-410) (active as of 2022)

SSNs:

- Yasen-class SSNs: (all active)
  - Severodvinsk (K-560) (active as of 2025)
  - Kazan (K-561) (active as of 2026)
  - Arkhangelsk (K-564) (active as of 2026)
  - Perm (K-572) (destined for the Pacific Fleet; on sea trials in the Northern Fleet operational area as of mid-2025)
- Akula-class SSNs: 12th Squadron, Gadzhiyevo; 24th Submarine Division
  - Pantera (K-317) (status unclear; may be in reserve)
  - Gepard (K-335) (only 971M variant of the class; reported active as of 2025)
  - Tigr (K-154) (in refit in the early 2020s; being equipped with 3M-54 Kalibr cruise missiles)
  - Volk (K-461) (inactive; reported in refit and upgrade until 2028, including arming with Kalibr cruise missiles)
  - Vepr (K-157) (Identified as sole Project 971A variant within the Akula-class; reported active as of 2025)
  - Leopard (K-328) (on sea trials as of 2026 following refit and upgrade; armed with 3M-54 Kalibr cruise missiles)
- Sierra II-class SSNs (7th Division, Vidyaevo) (both said to be in reserve/minimally active as of 2026):
  - Nizhniy Novgorod (B-534)
  - Pskov (K-336)
- Victor-III-class SSNs (7th Division):
  - Obninsk (K-138) (status unclear; reported active as of 2017)
  - Tambov (K-448) (active as of 2024; completed prolonged refit in 2022/23)

SSKs (4th Submarine Flotilla, Polyarny (ru); 161st Submarine Division):

- Kilo-class (diesel/electric) submarines:
  - Kaluga (B-800) (active as of 2025)
  - Vladikavkaz (B-459) (active as of 2021)
  - Magnitogorsk (B-471) (status unclear)
  - Lipetsk (B-177) (status unclear)
- Lada-class conventional propulsion (diesel/electric) submarines:
  - Kronshtadt (B-586) (entered service in 2024)
  - Velikiye Luki (B-587) (entered service 2025; operating in the Baltic but may be tasked to the Northern Fleet)

Special Operations Submarines: (29th Special Submarine Squadron; deployed with the Northern Fleet but under the command of the Main Directorate of Deep-Sea Research)

- Podmoskovye (BS-64) (active as of 2026; ex-Delta IV-class SSBN with missile tubes removed in "special purpose" role; "mothership" for smaller special operations submarine Losharik)
- Belgorod (K-329) (Entered service July 2022; reported in 2025 as deployed in the Northern Fleet operational area, but likely to transfer to the Pacific Fleet in due course; reported capable of deploying future Poseidon nuclear weapons)
- Khabarovsk (sea trials in the Northern Fleet area of operations as of 2026; likely to transfer to the Pacific Fleet in due course with dedicated support facility for the submarine being constructed in the Pacific region as of 2026; carries Poseidon weapon systems)
- Sarov (B-90) (active; hybrid conventional/nuclear-propulsion; intelligence collection/technology demonstrator; reported capable of deploying future Poseidon nuclear weapons)
- Losharik (AS-12/or 28/or 31) (hybrid conventional/nuclear propulsion; incapacitated after major fire July 2019; major repair undertaken from 2021; may have commenced post-repair sea trials in 2025 and possibly active again as of 2026; intelligence/special operations role)
- Orenburg (BS-136) (active; ex-Delta III-class SSBN; experimental role)
- Project 1851 (X-ray-class) boat AS-23 (reported active as of 2026)
- Paltus-class submarine (special purpose mini-submarines; hybrid conventional/nuclear propulsion):
  - AS-21
  - AS-35
- Project 1910 Kashalot-class (nuclear-powered special operations submarine)
  - AS-13
  - AS-15 (reportedly being prepared for active operations from Belgorod as of 2021)

=== Surface warships ===
Major Surface Combatants (43rd Missile Ship Division)

- Kuznetsov-class aircraft carrier (CV) Admiral Flota Sovetskogo Soyuza Kuznetsov (063), Navy flagship. (Severely damaged by fire, December 2019; reported in 2025 as unlikely to return to active service).
- Kirov-class battlecruisers (CGN):
  - Pyotr Velikiy (099) (inactive since 2022; upgrade cancelled)
  - Admiral Nakhimov (085) (Major modernization and upgrade; on sea trials as of September 2025.)
- Slava-class cruiser (CG) Marshal Ustinov (055) (active as of 2026)
- Admiral Gorshkov-class frigates:
  - Admiral Gorshkov (454) (active as of 2026)
  - Admiral Kasatonov (461) (active as of 2026)
  - Admiral Golovko (456) (active as of 2026)
- Udaloy-class destroyers (DDG) (2nd Anti-Submarine Ship Division):
  - Vice Admiral Kulakov (626) (active as of 2025)
  - Severomorsk (619) (active; operating regularly in the Baltic as of 2026 leading to suggestions that she may have replaced the former destroyer Nastoychivy as the Baltic Fleet flagship. Not officially confirmed)
  - Admiral Levchenko (605) (active as of 2026)
  - Admiral Chabanenko (650) (inactive as of 2025; unclear whether she will return to service)

Minor Surface Combatants

- Small Missile Ships (Light Missile Corvette)
  - Nanuchka III-class corvette
    - Rassvyet (520) (active as of 2026)
- Small Anti-Submarine Ships (ASW Corvette)
  - Grisha III-class corvette
    - Brest (199) (active as of 2025)
    - Yunga (113) (active as of 2026)
    - Onega (164) (active as of 2025)
    - Naryan-Mar (138) (active as of 2024)
    - Monchegorsk (190) (status unclear)
    - Snezhnogorsk (196) (active as of 2026)

Amphibious Warfare Vessels

- Ivan Gren-class landing ships
  - Ivan Gren (135) (active as of 2025)
  - Pyotr Morgunov (117) (active; deployed to the Black Sea and participating in the War in Ukraine)
- Ropucha-class landing ships
  - Olenegorsky Gornyak (012) (deployed to the Black Sea and participating in the War in Ukraine; reportedly seriously damaged in 2023)
  - Kondopoga (027) (active as of 2026)
  - Georgy Pobedonosets (016) (active; deployed to the Black Sea and participating in the War in Ukraine)
  - Aleksandr Otrakovsky (031) (active as of 2026)
- Project 02510 BK-16E high-speed assault boats: 4 vessels (D-308, D-2110, RVK-703, D-321)
- Project 1176 (Ondatra-class) landing craft: 4 vessels (D-163, D-182, D-148, D-464)

Mine Countermeasures Ships

- Alexandrit-class: 3 vessels; class will incrementally replace older ships/classes (Afanasy Ivannikov entered service in 2025; Polyarny & Dmitry Lysov in 2026)
- Sonya-class: 7 vessels (BT-21; Polyarny – reported active in 2020 but status unclear given commissioning of Alexandrit-class vessel of the same name; Elnya reported active as of 2022; Yadrin - reported active as of 2023; Kotelnich and Solovtskiy yunga - both active as of 2025; Kolomna - active as of 2026)
- Gorya-class: 1 vessel (Vladimir Gumanenko (811) – active as of 2022)

Patrol ships

- Ivan Susanin-class icebreaker/patrol ship Ruslan (active as of 2024)
- Project 23550 patrol ship Ivan Papanin (commissioned 2025; active in 2026)
- Patrol/Anti-saboteur Boats:
  - Grachonok-class anti-saboteur ship: 5 vessels (P-340 Yunarmeets Zapolyarya; P-421 Yunarmeets Belomorya; P-429 Sergey Preminin; P-430 Valery Fedyanin; P-475 Denis Vasilchenko - formerly Grachonok)

Principal Auxiliaries For a more complete list of Russian navy auxiliaries see: List of active Russian Navy ships#Auxiliaries

Icebreaker

- Project 21180 icebreaker Ilya Muromets (active)

Intelligence Vessels (operated by the Main Directorate of Deep-Sea Research):

- Vishnya-class intelligence ships:
  - Viktor Leonov (active as of 2026)
  - Tavriya
- Yury Ivanov-class intelligence ship Yuriy Ivanov (active as of 2026)
- Project 7452-class intelligence ship Chusuvoy (active as of 2024)
- Project 22010-class intelligence ship Yantar (active as of 2025)
- Project 02670-class 'Oceanographic research vessel' Evgeny Gorigledzhan (entered service in 2023)
- Project 141 Salvage vessel/ Submersible support:
  - KIL-143
  - KIL-164

Fleet Oilers

- Boris Chilikin-class: 1 vessel (Sergey Osipov; active as of 2026)
- Dubna class: 1 vessel (Dubna)
- Kaliningrad Neft class: 2 vessels (Vyazma and Kama (former Argun); Vyazma active as of 2025; Kama active as of 2026)
- Akademik Pashin class:
  - Akademik Pashin: (entered service 2019 and active as of 2026)
- Project 03180 class: Pecha & Umba

Logistic Support Ships

- 1 Elbrus-class (Project 23120) ice-capable logistics support vessel (entered service 2018)
- Project 304-class Repair Ships: 3 vessels (PM-10, PM-69, PM-75)

Hydrographic Survey Vessels: 4 Yug-class (Project 862) vessels

- Vizir
- Temryuk (formerly Mangyshlak)
- Gorizont (active as of 2021)
- Senezh

=== Aviation and Air Defence Forces ===
7th Composite Aviation Corps

- Fighters:
  - 100th Independent Shipborne Fighter Aviation Regiment – Severomorsk-3 air base; Two Squadrons: mix of carrier-capable MiG-29K/KUB, Su-27/KUB and Su-25/UTG aircraft reported (Carrier-capable MiG-29K reported deployed in land-based role since 2017, including at Rogachyovo airfield)
  - 279th Shipborne Fighter Aviation Regiment – HQ at Severomorsk-3 – Two Squadrons: Su-33 (Flanker-D)/Su-25UTG (as of 2025)
  - 98th Separate Composite Aviation Regiment: based at Monchegorsk air base with Su-24M / Su-24MR fighter bombers;
- 174th Fighter Aviation Regiment: MiG-31 BM-variant in air defence role based at Monchegorsk air base; some K-variant reported in anti-ship role with Kh-47M2 Kinzhal hypersonic anti-ship missiles (ASM); (composed of the former MiG31 squadron transferred from the 98th Aviation Regiment to the 6th Guards Air and Air Defence Forces Army of the Russian Air Force)]
- Maritime Patrol/ASW aircraft:
  - 703rd Independent Air Squadron – HQ at Kipelovo (Fedotovo) – Tu-142MK, Tu-142MR Maritime Patrol/ASW aircraft (some aircraft reportedly attacked by Ukrainian drones in May 2026 while undergoing maintenance at Taganrog Airport near Rostov-on-Don, up to 2 destroyed);
  - 403rd Guards Mixed Aviation Regiment – HQ at Severomorsk-1 – One ASW/ELINT Squadron: Il-38/N ASW aircraft, Il-22 command aircraft (NATO reporting name: Coot B), and Il-20RT electronic intelligence aircraft; One Transport Squadron: Tupolev Tu-134, An-12, An-26 transport aircraft (2019)
  - 830th Independent Shipborne Anti-Submarine Helicopter Regiment – HQ at Severomorsk-1 – Ka-27/PL/M ASW, Ka-29 attack, Ka-31 airborne radar helicopters (2019) (an additional helicopter regiment may have been established as of 2026)
- Bombers:
  - 40th Mixed Aviation Regiment (previously 924th Long Range Air Reconnaissance Regiment?) – HQ at Olenegorsk/Olenya – Tu-22M3 Backfire bombers with Kh-32 long-range supersonic and Kh-47M2 Kinzhal hypersonic anti-ship missiles; – Deployed in the Northern Fleet area of operations but under command of Russian Long-Range Aviation Forces; The Tu-22M3 contingent at Olenya was reportedly reinforced in 2025 when bombers, likely from the Belaya air base in Siberia, were deployed to the region. Tu-95MS Bear bombers have reportedly also used Olenya in carrying out strikes in Ukraine.]
- 1st Air Defence Division (Murmansk Oblast) formerly part of the Northern Fleet, as of 2026 suboridnate to the 6th Guards Air and Air Defence Forces Army of the Russian Air Force
  - 531st Anti-Aircraft Missile Regiment (Severomorsk-1 and 3 air base region – S-400/Pantsir-S1 surface-to-air missiles)
  - 583rd Anti-Aircraft Missile Regiment (Olenya region – S-300PM/PS surface-to-air missile system)
  - 1528th Anti-Aircraft Missile Regiment (Severodvinsk – S-400 SAMs)
- 3rd Air Defence Division (created 2019):
  - 33rd Anti-Aircraft Missile Regiment (S-400 SAM systems) (Rogachovo air base, Novaya Zemlya, Arkhangelsk Oblast) (as of 2019)
  - 414th Anti-Aircraft Missile Regiment established in 2019 with S-300V4 and/or S-300PS? surface-to-air missile system at Tiksi
- S-400 SAM deployments reported in both 1st and 3rd Air Defence Divisions at: Alexandra Land (Nagurskoye air base), Kotelny Island, and Wrangel Island, among others.
- S-300P SAM (NATO reporting name: SA-10 Grumble) at Rogachovo air base and elsewhere.

In mid-2026 it was reported that many of the long-range air defence assets in the Northern Fleet region might have been redeployed to counter the Ukrainian drone threat in other regions of the country. This potentially left important assets of the Northern Fleet more vulnerable should they be specifically targeted by Ukrainian long-range UAV forces. However, fortified and reinforced concrete hangar facilities, for fighters of Su-33 and MiG-29K size, were also reported as under construction at the Severomorsk-3 air base.]

- Unmanned Systems Regiment(s): First regiment reported formed in July 2026 (four additional regiments reportedly being added in 2026)

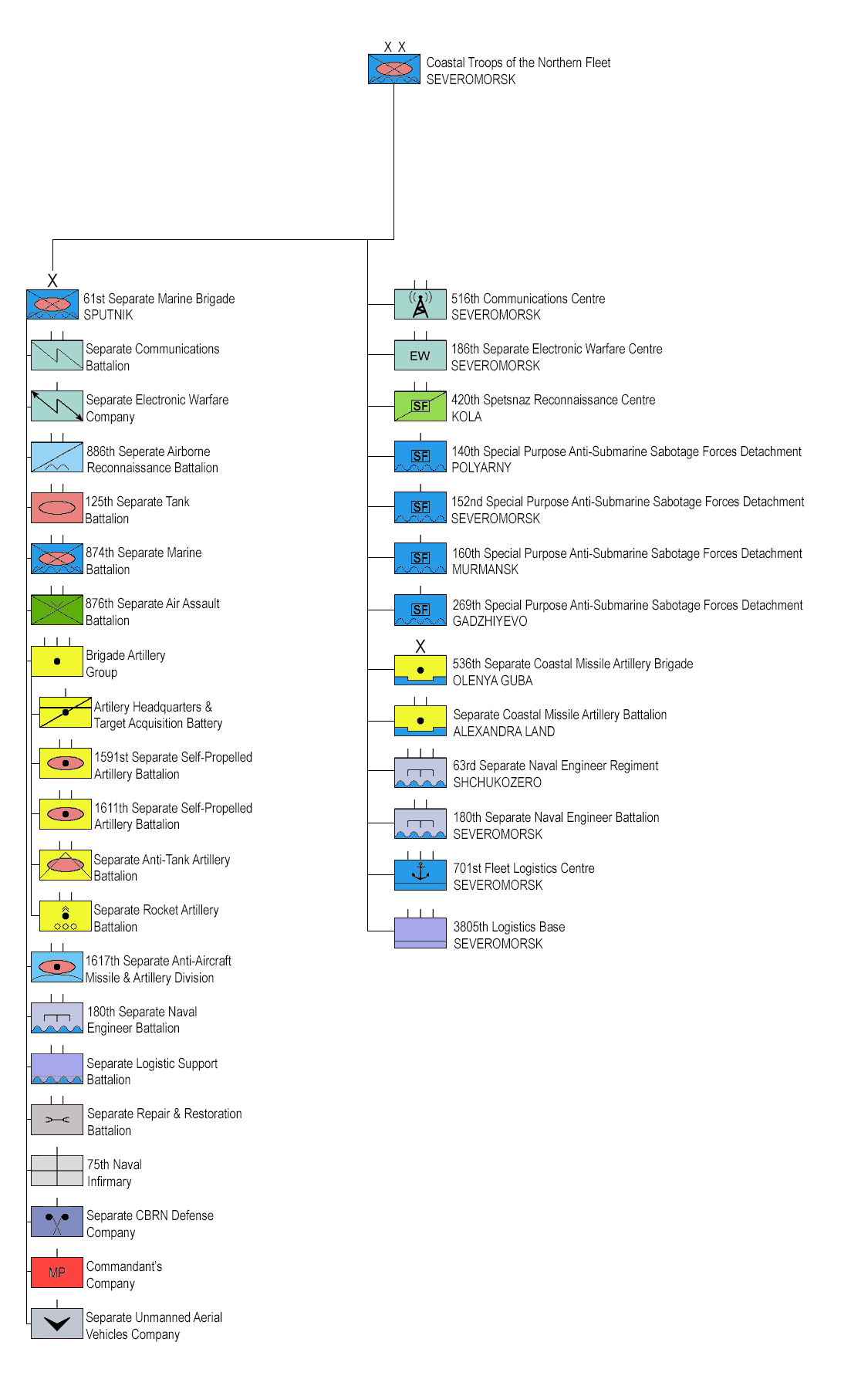
Northern Fleet Naval Infantry Forces

=== Northern Fleet Coastal Troops ===
- Naval Infantry/Special Forces
  - 61st Guards Naval Infantry Brigade: As of February 2022, elements of the Brigade reported deployed to the Black Sea as part of Russian amphibious task force for operations in Ukraine. As of September 2025, elements of the brigade were reported operating in Dobropillya tactical area in eastern Ukraine. The brigade had previously been reported operating in the area of Kherson.
  - 420th Naval Reconnaissance Spetsnaz Point (Special Forces battalion) (Zverosovkhoz)
- Coastal Missile & Artillery Troops: 536th Coastal Missile and Artillery Brigade (coastal missile brigades normally deployed with 3–5 K-300P Bastion-P battalions and 1–2 Bal battalions).
  - Bal mobile coastal missile system reported deployed on the Sredny Peninsula and Franz Josef Island (planned to be fitted at strategic locations along the entire Northern Sea Route)
  - Bastion coastal defence missile system with P-800 Oniks supersonic anti-ship cruise missiles reported on Alexandra Land in the Franz Josef Islands and Kotelny Island.

== Commanders ==
Name	Period of command
Zakhar Zakupnev (Flag Officer First Rank)	29 May 1933 – 13 March 1935; Northern Flotilla
Konstantin Dushenov (Flag Officer First Rank)	13 March 1935 – 11 May 1937; Northern Fleet; 11 May 1937 – 28 May 1938
Valentin Drozd (Vice Admiral)	28 May 1938 – 26 July 1940
Arseniy Golovko (Admiral)	26 July 1940 – 4 August 1946
Vasiliy Platonov (Admiral)	4 August 1946 – 23 April 1952
Andrey Chabanenko (Admiral)	23 April 1952 – 28 February 1962
Vladimir Kasatonov (Admiral)	28 February 1962 – 2 June 1964
Semyon Lobov (Fleet Admiral)	2 June 1964 – 3 May 1972
Georgiy Egorov (Fleet Admiral)	3 May 1972 – 1 July 1977
Vladimir Chernavin (Fleet Admiral)	1 July 1977 – 16 December 1981
Arkadiy Mikhaylovskiy (Admiral)	16 December 1981 – 25 February 1985
Ivan Kapitanets (Admiral)	25 February 1985 – 19 March 1988
Feliks Gromov (Admiral)	19 March 1988 – 14 March 1992
Oleg Yerofeyev (Admiral)	14 March 1992 – 29 January 1999
Vyacheslav Popov (Admiral)	29 January 1999 – 15 December 2001
Gennady Suchkov (Admiral)	16 December 2001 – 29 May 2004
Mikhail Abramov (Admiral)	29 May 2004 – 26 September 2005
Vladimir Vysotskiy (Admiral)	26 September 2005 – 11 September 2007
Nikolay Maksimov (Vice Admiral)	12 September 2007 – 30 March 2011
Andrey Volozhinskiy (Rear Admiral) – Acting	30 March 2011 – 24 June 2011
Vladimir Korolev (Admiral)	24 June 2011 – November 2015
Nikolay Yevmenov (Admiral)	November 2015 – 3 May 2019
Aleksandr Moiseyev (Admiral)	3 May 2019 – 10 March 2024
Konstantin Kabantsov (Vice-Admiral)	10 March 2024 – present

== See also ==
- Status 6 (Poseidon)
