= Zaozyorsk =

Closed town in Murmansk Oblast, Russia

Zaozyorsk Заозёрск
- Town
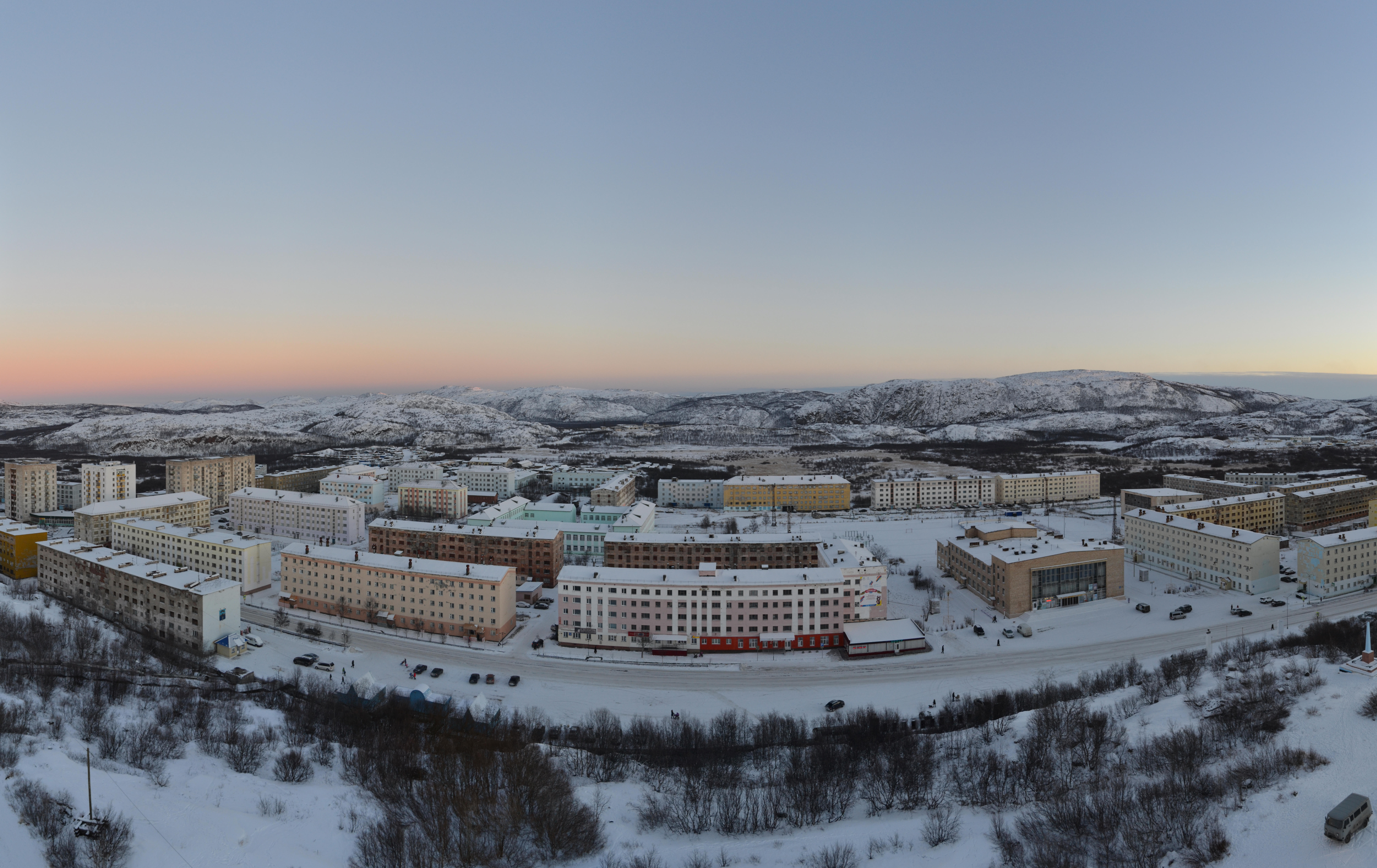
- View of Zaozyorsk

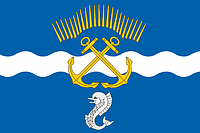
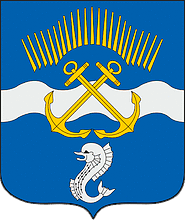
- Flag Coat of arms
- Interactive map of Zaozyorsk
- Location of Zaozyorsk Zaozyorsk (Murmansk Oblast)
- Coordinates: 69°23′52″N 32°26′57″E
- Country: Russia
- Federal subject: Murmansk Oblast
- Founded: 1958
- Town status since: September 14, 1981

Government
  - Head: Igor Vinokur
- Elevation: 60 m (200 ft)

Population (2010 Census)
  - Total: 11,199
  - Estimate (2023): 7,760 (−30.7%)

Administrative status
  - Subordinated to: closed administrative-territorial formation of Zaozyorsk
  - Capital of: closed administrative-territorial formation of Zaozyorsk

Municipal status
  - Urban okrug: Zaozyorsk Urban Okrug
  - Capital of: Zaozyorsk Urban Okrug
- Time zone: UTC+3 (MSK)
- Postal code: 184310
- Dialing code: +7 81556
- OKTMO ID: 47733000001
- Website: zatozaozersk.ru

Map of Northern Fleet bases

Zaozyorsk (Russian: Заозёрск), formerly known as Zaozyorny (Заозёрный), Severomorsk-7 (Североморск-7), and Murmansk-150 (Му́рманск-150), is a closed town in Murmansk Oblast, Russia. As of the 2010 Census, its population was 11,199; down from 12,687 recorded in the 2002 Census.

== History ==
Building of what was to become Zaozyorsk began in 1958 as a base for a nuclear underwater fleet that would be deployed in 1961. Originally known as Zaozyorny (Заозёрный), it was referred to as Severomorsk-7 (Североморск-7) for postal purposes. On September 14, 1981, it was granted town status and renamed Zaozyorsk, although for postal purposes the name Murmansk-150 (Му́рманск-150) was used. On January 4, 1994, the use of this code name was discontinued.

== Administrative and municipal status ==
Within the framework of administrative divisions, it is incorporated as the closed administrative-territorial formation of Zaozyorsk—an administrative unit with the status equal to that of the districts. As a municipal division, the closed administrative-territorial formation of Zaozyorsk is incorporated as Zaozyorsk Urban Okrug.
