= Nuclear submarine =

Submarine powered by a nuclear reactor

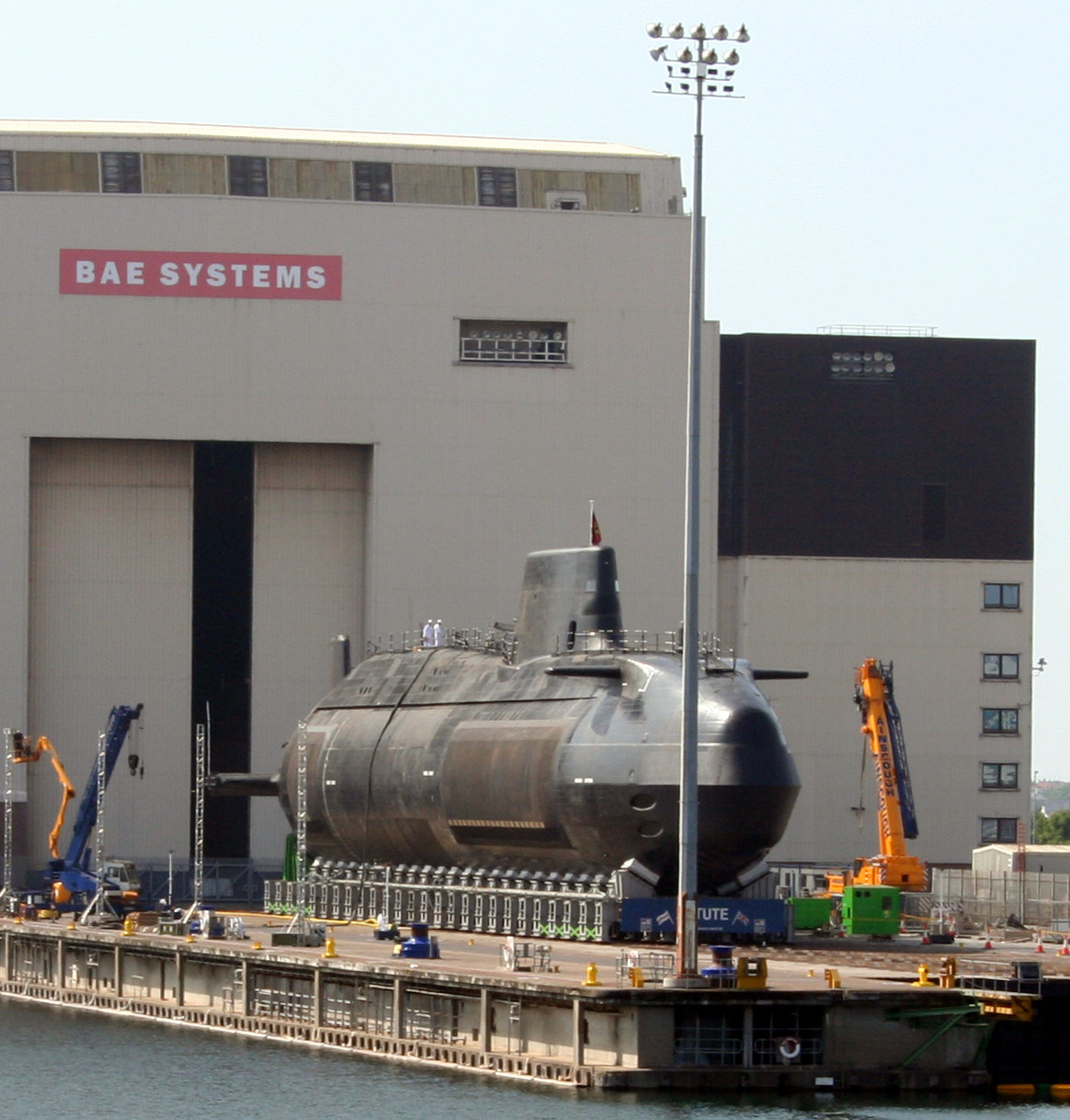
- British Astute-class submarine
- Classification: Watercraft
- Industry: Arms
- Application: Underwater warfare
- Invented: 1955 (71 years ago)

A nuclear submarine is a submarine powered by a nuclear reactor, but not necessarily nuclear-armed.

Nuclear submarines have considerable performance advantages over "conventional" (typically diesel-electric) submarines. Nuclear propulsion, being completely independent of air, frees the submarine from the need to surface frequently, as is necessary for conventional submarines. The large amount of power generated by a nuclear reactor allows nuclear submarines to operate at high speed for long periods, and the long interval between refuelings grants a virtually unlimited range, making the only limits on voyage times factors such as the need to restock food or other consumables. Thus nuclear propulsion solves the problem of limited mission duration that all electric (battery or fuel cell powered) submarines face. Furthermore nuclear submarines can regenerate consumables to a certain extent, producing oxygen and fresh water from seawater via electrolysis and desalination.

The high cost of nuclear technology means that relatively few of the world's military powers have fielded nuclear submarines. Radiation incidents have occurred within the Soviet submarines, including serious nuclear and radiation accidents, but American naval reactors starting with the S1W and subsequent designs have operated without incident since the launch of USS Nautilus (SSN-571) in 1954.

== Nomenclature ==
In the US classification, nuclear-powered submarines are designated as SSxN, where the SS stands for "submarine ship", x=G means that the submarine is equipped with guided missiles (usually cruise missiles), x=B means that the submarine is equipped with ballistic missiles (usually intercontinental) and the N means that the submarine is nuclear-powered. SSN refers to nuclear-powered attack submarines, which do not carry missiles.

== History ==
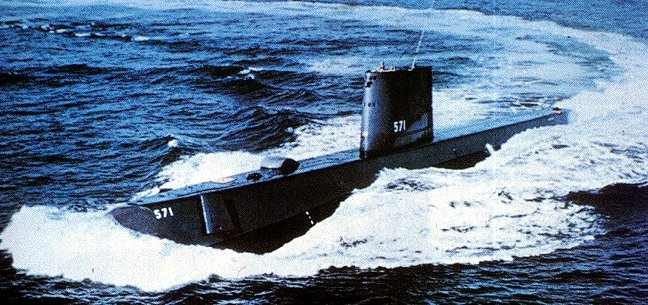
USS Nautilus, the first nuclear-powered submarine.

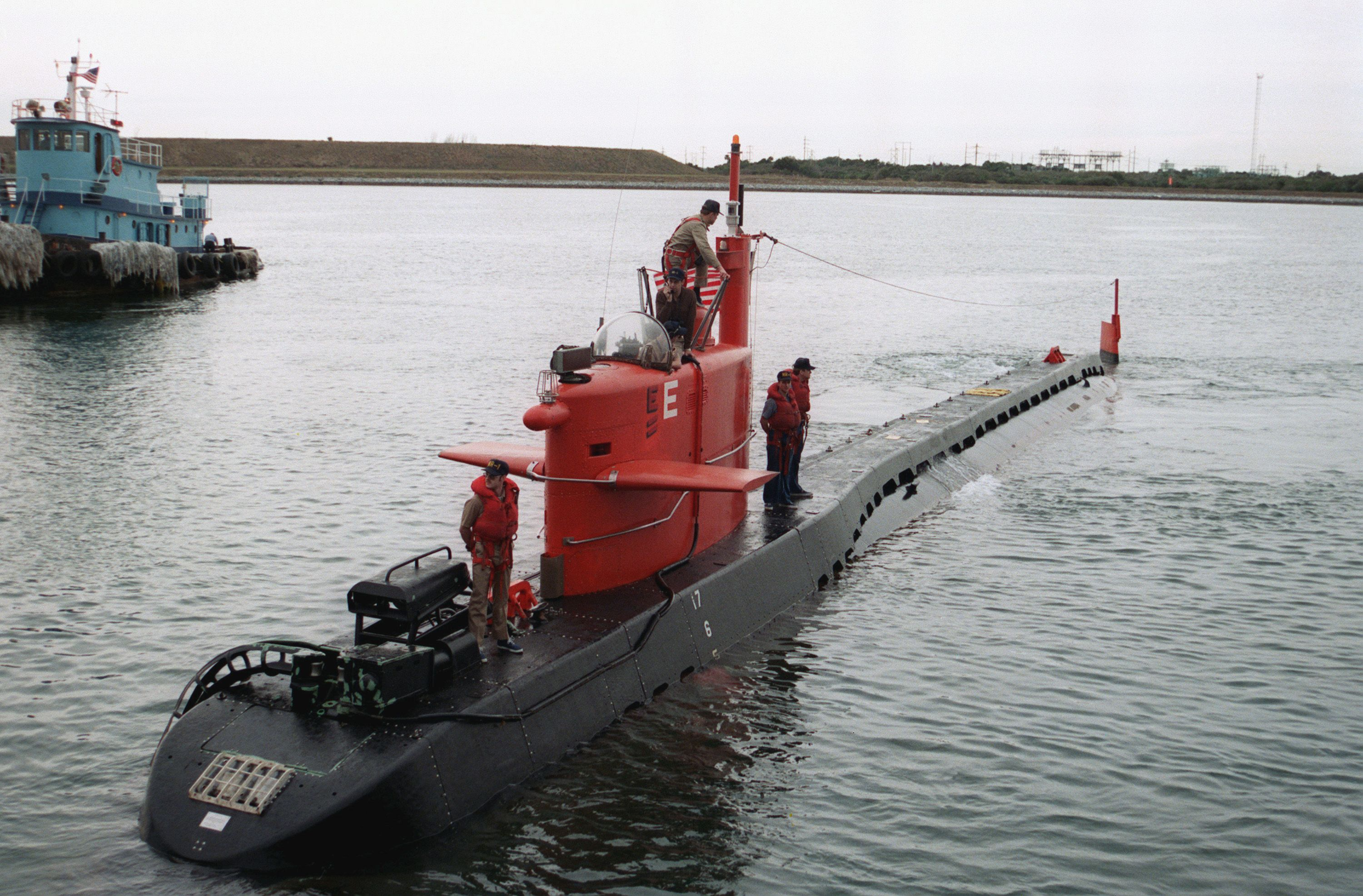
The smallest nuclear-powered submarine, the U.S. Navy's NR-1.

The idea for a nuclear-powered submarine was first proposed in the United States Navy by the Naval Research Laboratory's physicist Ross Gunn in 1939. The Royal Navy began researching designs for nuclear propulsion plants in 1946.

Construction of the world's first nuclear-powered submarine was made possible by the successful development of a nuclear propulsion plant by a group of scientists and engineers in the United States at the Naval Reactors Branch of the Bureau of Ships and the Atomic Energy Commission. In July 1951, the U.S. Congress authorized construction of the first nuclear-powered submarine, Nautilus, under the leadership of Captain Hyman G. Rickover, USN (sharing a name with Captain Nemo's fictional submarine Nautilus in Jules Verne's 1870 novel Twenty Thousand Leagues Under the Seas, the first demonstrably practical submarine Nautilus, and another USS Nautilus (SS-168) that served with distinction in World War II).

The Westinghouse Corporation was assigned to build its reactor. After the submarine was completed at the Electric Boat Company, First Lady Mamie Eisenhower broke the traditional bottle of champagne on Nautilus' bow, and the submarine was commissioned USS Nautilus (SSN-571), on 30 September 1954. On 17 January 1955, she departed Groton, Connecticut, to begin sea trials. The submarine was 320 feet (98 m) long and cost about $55 million. Recognizing the utility of such vessels, the British Admiralty formed plans to build nuclear-powered submarines.

The Soviet Union soon followed the United States in developing nuclear-powered submarines in the 1950s. Stimulated by the U.S. development of Nautilus, Soviets began work on nuclear propulsion reactors in the early 1950s at the Institute of Physics and Power Engineering, in Obninsk, under Anatoliy P. Alexandrov, later to become head of the Kurchatov Institute. In 1956, the first Soviet propulsion reactor designed by his team began operational testing. Meanwhile, a design team under Vladimir N. Peregudov worked on the vessel that would house the reactor. After overcoming many obstacles, including steam generation problems, radiation leaks, and other difficulties, the first nuclear submarine based on these combined efforts, K-3 Leninskiy Komsomol of the Project 627 Kit class, called a November-class submarine by NATO, entered service in the Soviet Navy in 1958.

The United Kingdom's first nuclear-powered submarine HMS Dreadnought was fitted with an American S5W reactor, provided to Britain under the 1958 US-UK Mutual Defence Agreement. The hull and combat systems of Dreadnought were of British design and construction, although the hull form and construction practices were influenced by access to American designs. During Dreadnought's construction, Rolls-Royce, in collaboration with the United Kingdom Atomic Energy Authority at the Admiralty Research Station, HMS Vulcan, at Dounreay, developed a completely new British nuclear propulsion system. In 1960, the UK's second nuclear-powered submarine was ordered from Vickers Armstrong and, fitted with Rolls-Royce's PWR1 nuclear plant, HMS Valiant was the first all-British nuclear submarine. Further technology transfers from the United States made Rolls-Royce entirely self-sufficient in reactor design in exchange for a "considerable amount" of information regarding submarine design and quietening techniques transferred from the United Kingdom to the United States. The rafting system for the Valiant class provided the Royal Navy with an advantage in submarine silencing that the United States Navy did not introduce until considerably later.

Nuclear power proved ideal for the propulsion of strategic ballistic missile submarines (SSB), greatly improving their ability to remain submerged and undetected. The world's first operational nuclear-powered ballistic missile submarine (SSBN) was USS George Washington with 16 Polaris A-1 missiles, which conducted the first SSBN deterrent patrol November 1960 – January 1961. The Soviets already had several SSBs of the Project 629 (Golf class) and were only a year behind the US with their first SSBN, ill-fated K-19 of Project 658 (Hotel class), commissioned in November 1960. However, this class carried the same three-missile armament as the Golfs. The first Soviet SSBN with 16 missiles was the Project 667A (Yankee class), the first of which entered service in 1967, by which time the US had commissioned 41 SSBNs, nicknamed the "41 for Freedom".

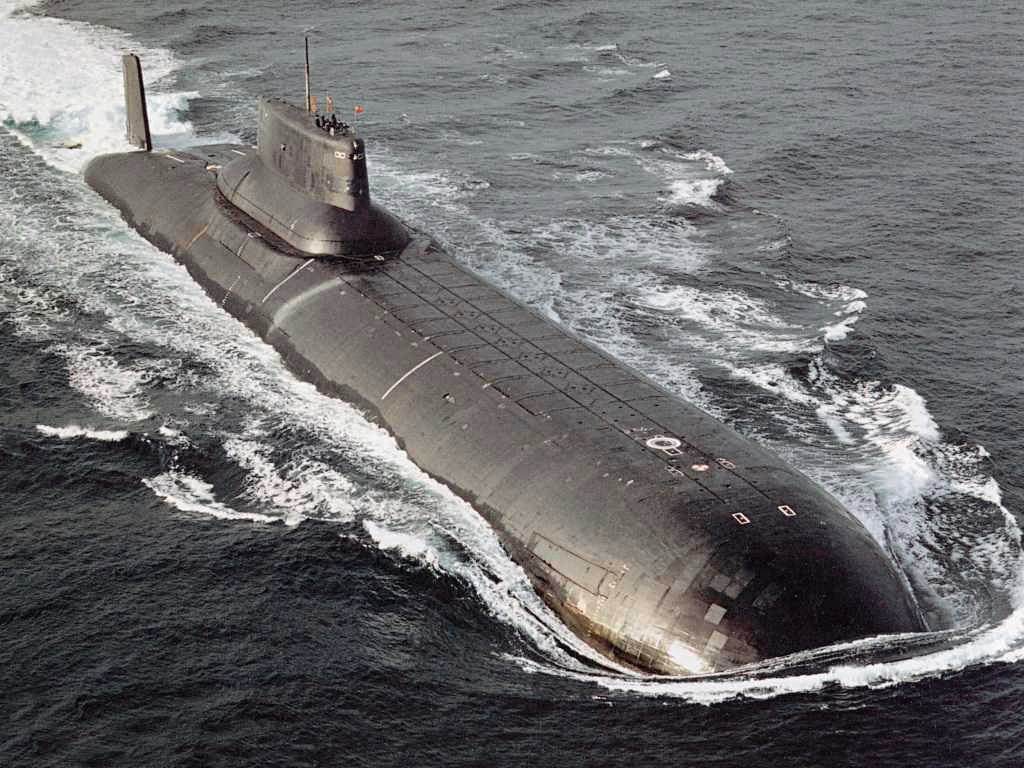
The nuclear-powered VMF Typhoon-class submarines were the world's largest-displacement submarines.

At the height of the Cold War, approximately five to ten nuclear submarines were being commissioned yearly from the four Soviet submarine yards (Sevmash in Severodvinsk, Admiralteyskiye Verfi in St. Petersburg, Krasnoye Sormovo in Nizhny Novgorod, and Amurskiy Zavod in Komsomolsk-on-Amur). From the late 1950s through the end of 1997, the Soviet Union, and later Russia, built a total of 245 nuclear submarines, more than all other nations combined.

In the United Kingdom, all former and current nuclear submarines of the British Royal Navy (with the exception of three: HMS Conqueror, HMS Renown and HMS Revenge) have been constructed in Barrow-in-Furness (at BAE Systems Submarine Solutions or its predecessor VSEL) where construction of nuclear submarines continues. Conqueror was the first nuclear-powered submarine to engage an enemy ship with torpedoes, sinking the cruiser ARA General Belgrano with two Mark 8 torpedoes during the 1982 Falklands War.

As of 2026, six countries deploy some form of nuclear-powered strategic submarines: the United States, Russia, the United Kingdom, France, China, and India. Several other countries including Brazil, Australia and North Korea have ongoing projects in various phases to build nuclear-powered submarines. In the meantime, the United States is developing Columbia-class submarines. It is expected to have 16 missile tubes and to have its first patrol mission in 2031. Twelve submarines of this class, with a service life of ca. 42 years, are expected to be commissioned.

== Technology ==
The main difference between conventional submarines and nuclear submarines is the power generation system. Nuclear submarines employ nuclear reactors for this task. They either generate electricity that powers electric motors connected to the propeller shaft or rely on the reactor's heat to produce steam that drives steam turbines (cf. nuclear marine propulsion). Reactors used in submarines typically use highly enriched fuel to enable them to deliver a large amount of power from a smaller reactor and operate longer between refuelings – which are difficult due to the reactor's position within the submarine's pressure hull. Also, virtually all nuclear reactors employed in submarines so far have been of the pressurized light-water reactor (PWR) type. Due to concerns about nuclear proliferation some nuclear submarines have been fueled by low-enriched uranium comparable to the fuel used in civilian light water reactors used for electricity production on land. For example the French Rubis-class submarines use low-enriched uranium with 7% ^{235}U in the fuel. The downside to using lower enriched fuel is that refueling cycles are shorter (land-based power reactors commonly have refueling cycles in the range of 18-24 months) which reduces availability of the submarine. Furthermore, the ^{238}U contained in the fuel will absorb neutrons and be transmutated into plutonium and minor actinides which can be a problem in disposal of the used fuel. Reactors other than PWRs have been deployed on the Soviet Alfa class submarines as well as USS Seawolf (SSN-575). However, those were seen as technological dead-ends and not pursued further.

The nuclear reactor also supplies power to the submarine's other subsystems, such as for maintenance of air quality, fresh water production by distilling sea water, temperature regulation, etc. All naval nuclear reactors currently in use are operated with diesel generators as a backup power system. These engines are able to provide emergency electrical power for reactor decay heat removal, as well as enough electric power to supply an emergency propulsion mechanism. Submarines may carry nuclear fuel for up to 30 years of operation. The only resource that limits the time underwater is the food supply for the crew and maintenance of the vessel. In practice, psychological considerations also apply as it is not desirable for the crew to spend too long in the enclosed space of a submerged submarine.

The stealth technology weakness of nuclear submarines is the need to cool the reactor even when the submarine is not moving; about 70% of the reactor output heat is dissipated into the sea water. This leaves a "thermal wake", a plume of warm water of lower density which ascends to the sea surface and creates a "thermal scar" that is observable by thermal imaging systems, e.g., FLIR. Another problem is that the reactor is always running, creating steam noise, which can be heard on sonar, and the reactor pump (used to circulate reactor coolant) also creates noise, as opposed to a conventional submarine, which can move about on almost silent electric motors.

=== Recent developments ===
It has been reported that in 2027 the Russian Navy plans to introduce a nuclear-powered and nuclear-armed unmanned underwater vehicle named Poseidon. Limited data available in open literature suggests that it uses a small (most likely enriched uranium-fueled) reactor and is capable of travelling at a maximum speed of 130 km/h. It is expected to be launched from specially designed Belgorod class submarines and to hit large coastal cities as a second strike weapon. (Although the initial tests of Poseidon were conducted with a diesel-electric submarine Sarov). The main advantage of using unmanned underwater vehicles instead of SSBNs as a second strike weapon is to prevent the loss of lives of the SSBN crew. If the second strike nuclear missiles are launched directly from an SSBN, the location of the submarine is revealed and it can be quickly destroyed in a third strike by a cruise or ballistic missile, launched from another submarine, from a surface ship or from land. When a UUV delivers a nuclear charge, the location of the mothership remains unknown, and the ship is likely to survive the 3rd strike. No other country is known to be developing similar weapons in 2024.

== Decommissioning ==
The useful lifetime of a nuclear submarine is estimated to be approximately 25 to 30 years, after which the submarine will face fatigue and corrosion of components, obsolescence and escalating operating costs. The decommissioning of these submarines is a long process; some are held in reserve or mothballed for some time and eventually scrapped, others are disposed of immediately. Countries operating nuclear submarines have different strategies when it comes to decommissioning nuclear submarines. Nonetheless, the effective disposal of nuclear submarines is costly: in 2004 it was estimated to cost around 4 billion dollars.

=== Methods ===
Generally there are two options when it comes to decommissioning nuclear submarines. The first option is to defuel the nuclear reactor and remove the material and components that contain radioactivity, after which the hull section containing the nuclear reactor will then be cut out of the submarine and transported to a disposal site for low-level radioactive waste and get buried according to waste procedures. The second option is to defuel the nuclear reactor, disassemble the submarine propulsion plant, install vents in the nonreactor compartments and fill the reactor compartment. After sealing the submarine it can then be towed to a designated deep-sea disposal site, be flooded and settle intact on the sea floor. This last option has been considered by some navies and countries in the past. However, while sea disposal is cheaper than land disposal, the uncertainty regarding regulations and international law, such as the London Dumping Convention and the Law of the Sea Convention, has stopped them from proceeding with this option.

== Lineage ==
=== Operational ===
==== China ====
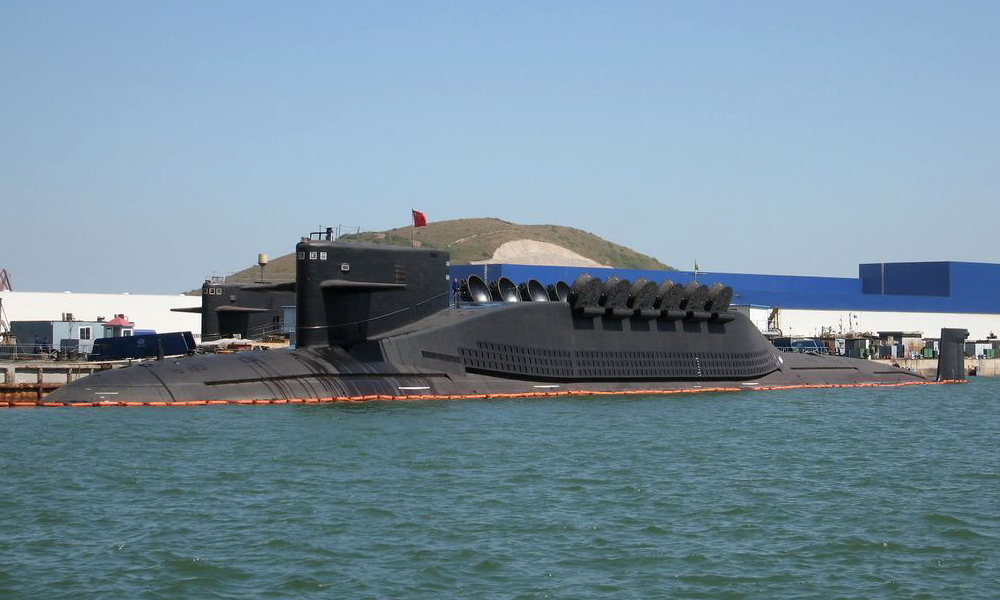
A Type 094 submarine.

- 3 Type 091 (Han) attack submarines
- 12 Type 093 (Shang) attack submarines
- 6 Type 094 (Jin) ballistic missile submarines

==== France ====
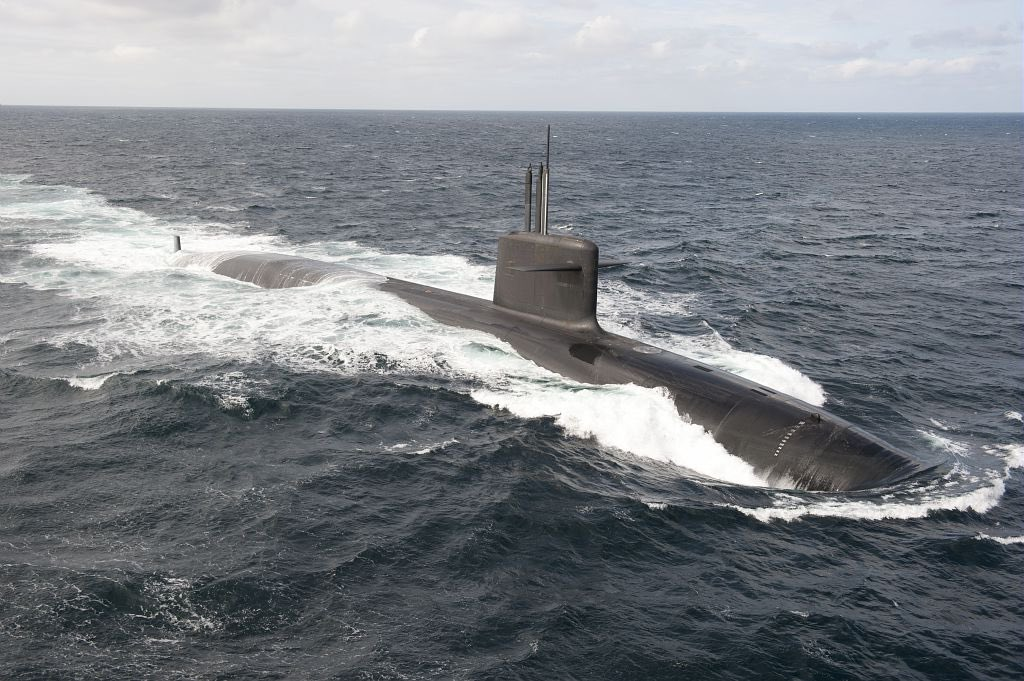
A Triomphant-class submarine.

- 2 Rubis-class attack submarines
- 4 Triomphant-class ballistic missile submarines, 4 have been operational since 1997.
- 3 Suffren-class attack submarines (First boat of the class, Suffren commissioned November 6, 2020)

==== India ====
INS Arihant, an indigenous nuclear submarine of the Indian navy.

- 4 Arihant-class submarines — Ballistic missile submarines. 3 Active, 1 Commissioning.

==== Russia ====
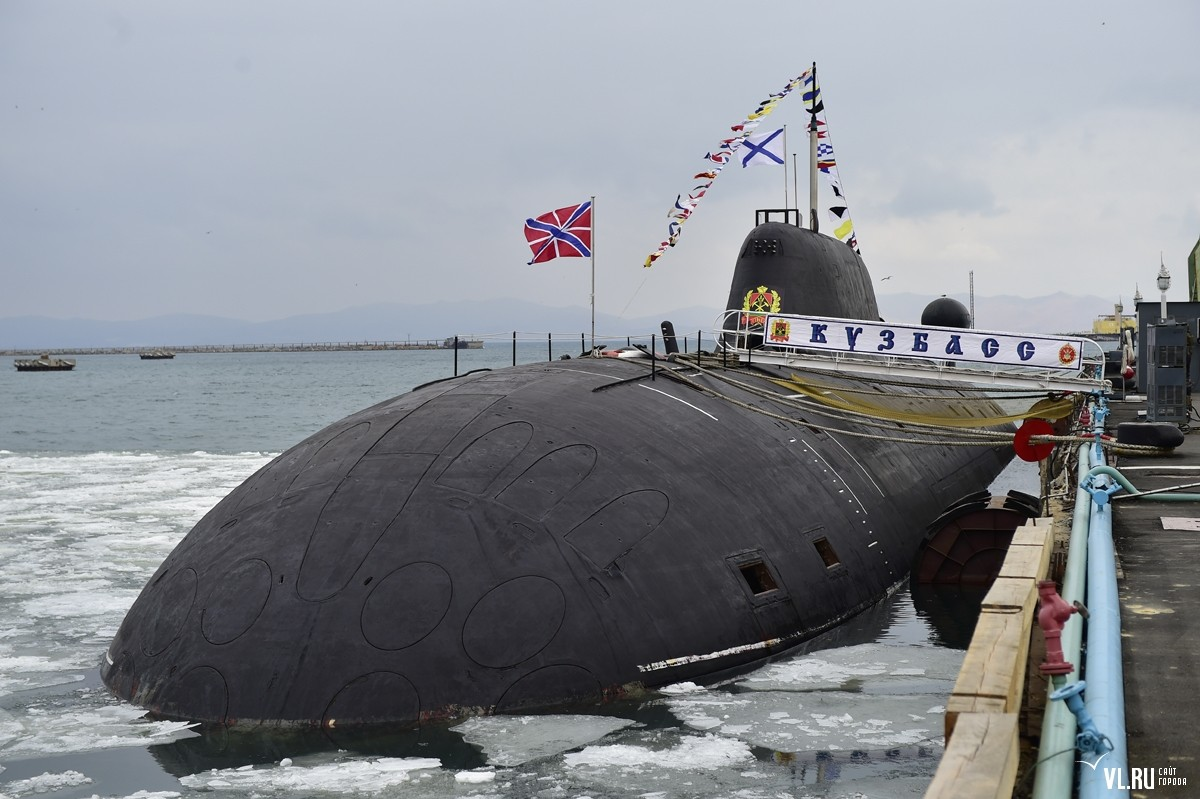
An Akula-class submarine.

- 1 Project 667BDR, Kalmar (Delta III) ballistic missile submarines
- 6 Project 667BDRM, Delfin (Delta IV) ballistic missile submarines
- 2 Project 671RTM Shchuka (Victor III) attack submarines
- 5 Project 885 (Yasen) attack submarines
- 8 Project 935 (Borei) ballistic missile submarines. 4 were operational and 4 were under construction in 2021.
- 2 Project 945 (Sierra) attack submarines
- 6 Project 949 (Oscar) cruise missile submarines
- 4 Project 971 (Akula) attack submarines
- 2 Project 1851.1 (Paltus) special purpose submarines
- 2 Project 1910 Kashalot-class (Uniform) special purpose submarines
- 0 Project 1983.1 AS-12 (Losharik) special purpose submarine
- 0 Project 09851. Khabarovsk-class submarine. A new-design, purpose-built submarine for carrying six Poseidon nuclear torpedoes.
- 1 Project 09852. Russian submarine Belgorod is a modified Oscar II-class submarine that was rebuilt as a special mission vessel. It is designed to carry up to six Poseidon torpedoes and to conduct deep-sea research and rescue missions.

==== United Kingdom ====
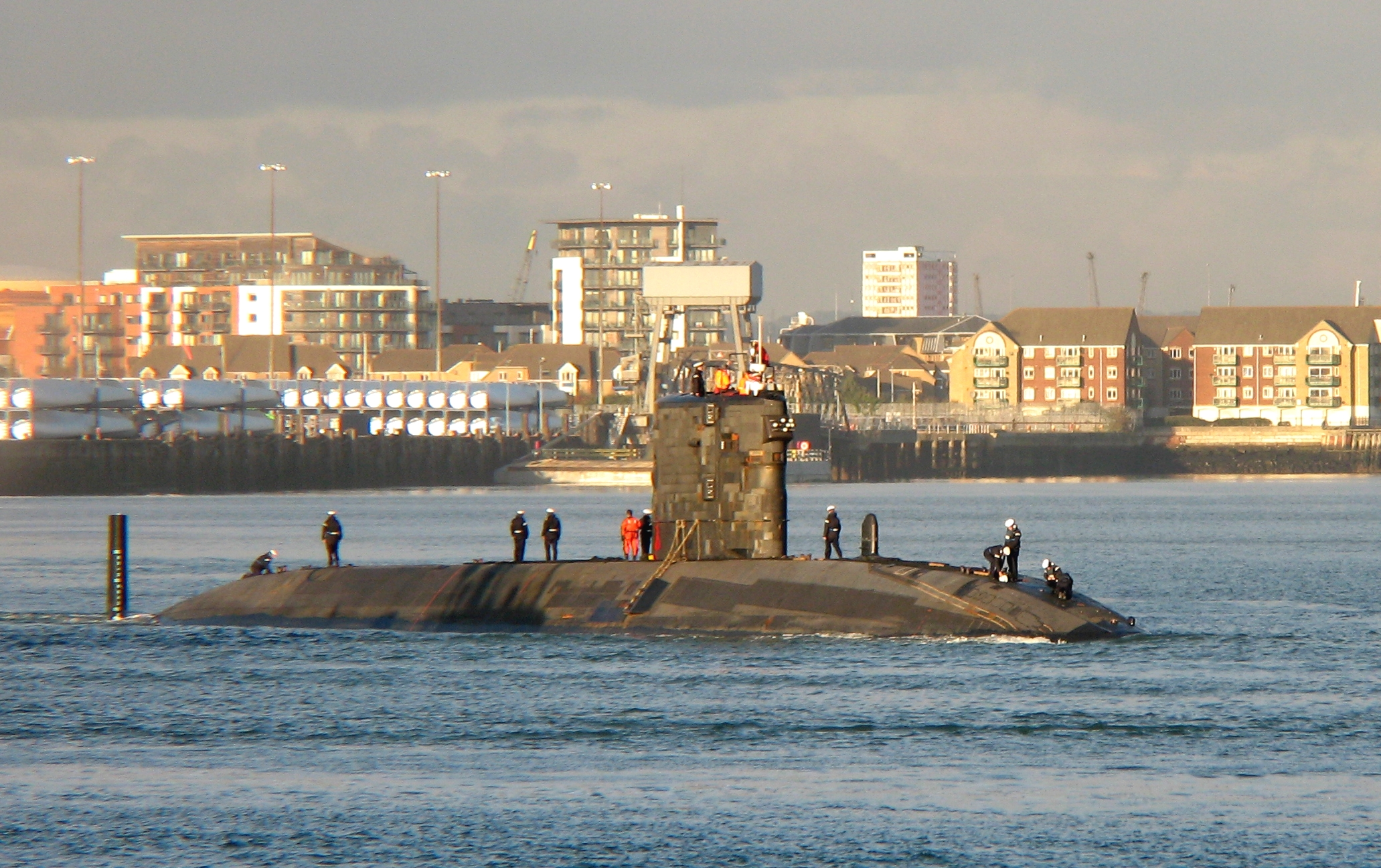
A Trafalgar-class submarine.

- 4 Vanguard-class ballistic missile submarines - 4 were operational in 2021.
- 6 Astute-class attack submarines

==== United States ====
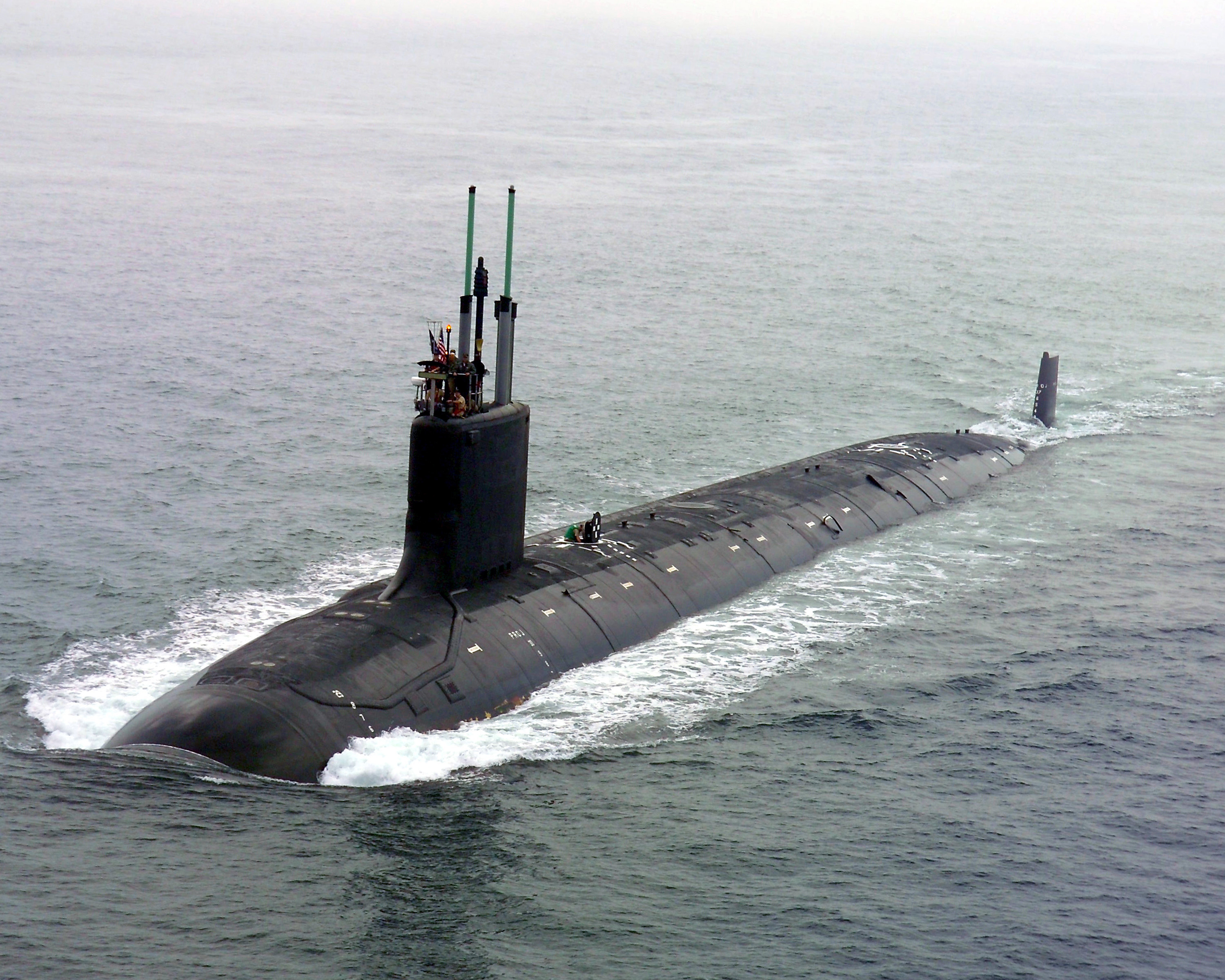
A Virginia-class submarine.

- 23 SCB-303: Los Angeles-class attack submarines
- 18 SCB-304: Ohio-class ballistic missile submarines - 14 ships with service life extended from 30 to 42 years. Each carries 20-24 SLBMs.
- 3 Seawolf-class attack submarines
- 24 Virginia-class attack submarines

=== Future submarine classes / operators ===
==== Australia ====
- Plans to purchase:
  - Virginia-class attack submarines
- Under development:
  - SSN-AUKUS attack submarines

==== Brazil ====
- Riachuelo-class submarine the first 6,000-tonne attack submarine, under construction.

==== China ====
- Type 095 attack submarines (In development)
- Type 096 ballistic missile submarines

==== France ====
- SNLE 3G-class ballistic missile submarines - 4 planned.

==== India ====
- 1 Arihant-class submarines — Ballistic missile submarines.
- 2 Project 77-class submarines — Attack submarines; 6 planned.
- INS Chakra III — Attack submarine.
- 2 S5-class submarines — Ballistic missile submarines; at least 4 planned.

==== North Korea ====
- In March 2025, North Korea released photos of a nuclear-powered ballistic missile submarine under construction, with the hull largely finished.

==== Russia ====
- Arcturus-class submarine is scheduled to start replacing the Project 935 (Borei) ballistic missile submarines from 2037 onwards.

==== South Korea ====
- In October 2025, President Lee Jae Myung announced plans to build nuclear-powered attack submarines and asked the United States to supply the nuclear fuel.

==== Turkish Naval Forces ====
- Plans to build nuclear attack submarine as part of the NUKDEN.

==== United Kingdom ====
- Dreadnought-class ballistic missile submarines are expected to replace the Vanguard-class ballistic missile submarines starting in the early 2030's.
- SSN-AUKUS attack submarines

==== United States ====
- Columbia-class submarine scheduled to replace the Ohio class from 2031 on.

=== Decommissioned ===
==== China ====
- Type 092 (Xia) ballistic missile submarines

==== France ====
- Redoutable-class ballistic missile submarines

==== India ====
- INS Chakra (Soviet Charlie-class submarine).
- INS Chakra 2 (Russian Akula-class submarine).

==== Russia / Soviet Union ====
- Project 627 (November) attack submarines
- Project 645 test attack submarine K-27
- Project 658 (Hotel) ballistic missile submarines
- Project 659/675 (Echo) cruise missile submarines
- Project 661 (Papa) attack submarine
- Project 667 (Yankee) ballistic missile submarines
- Project 667B, Murena (Delta I) ballistic missile submarines
- Project 667BD, Murena-M (Delta II) ballistic missile submarines
- Project 670 (Charlie) cruise missile submarines
- Project 671 (Victor) attack submarines
- Project 678 (X-Ray) research submersible
- Project 685 (Mike) attack submarine K-278 Komsomolets
- Project 705 (Alfa) attack submarines
- Project 941 (Typhoon) ballistic missile submarines

==== United Kingdom ====
- HMS Dreadnought (S101)
- Valiant-class attack submarines
- Resolution-class ballistic missile submarines
- Churchill-class attack submarines
- Swiftsure-class attack submarines
- Trafalgar-class attack submarines

==== United States ====
- SCB-64: USS Nautilus (SSN-571)
- SCB-64A: USS Seawolf (SSN-575)
- SCB-121: Skate-class attack submarines
- SCB-132: USS Triton (SSRN-586)
- SCB-137A: USS Halibut (SSGN-587)
- SCB-154: Skipjack-class attack submarines
- SCB-178: USS Tullibee (SSN-597)
- SCB-180A: George Washington-class ballistic missile submarines
- SCB-180: Ethan Allen-class ballistic missile submarines
- SCB-188: Thresher-Permit-class attack submarines
- SCB-188A: Sturgeon-class attack submarines
- SCB-216: Lafayette-class ballistic missile submarines
- SCB-216: James Madison-class ballistic missile submarines
- SCB-216: Benjamin Franklin-class ballistic missile submarines
- NR-1
- SCB-245: USS Narwhal (SSN-671)
- SCB-302: USS Glenard P. Lipscomb (SSN-685)

== Accidents ==
=== Reactor accidents ===
Some of the most serious nuclear and radiation accidents by death toll in the world have involved nuclear submarine mishaps. To date, all of these were units of the former Soviet Union. Reactor accidents that resulted in core damage and release of radioactivity from nuclear-powered submarines include:

- K-8, 1960: suffered a loss-of-coolant accident; substantial radioactivity released.
- K-14, 1961: the reactor compartment was replaced due to unspecified "breakdown of reactor protection systems".
- K-19, 1961: suffered a loss-of-coolant accident resulting in 8 deaths and more than 30 other people being over-exposed to radiation. The events on board the submarine are dramatized by the film K-19: The Widowmaker.
- K-11, 1965: both reactors were damaged during refueling while lifting the reactor vessel heads; reactor compartments scuttled off the east coast of Novaya Zemlya in the Kara Sea in 1966.
- K-27, 1968: experienced reactor core damage to one of its liquid metal (lead-bismuth) cooled VT-1 reactors, resulting in 9 fatalities and 83 other injuries; scuttled in the Kara Sea in 1982.
- K-140, 1968: the reactor was damaged following an uncontrolled, automatic increase in power during shipyard work.
- K-429, 1970: an uncontrolled start-up of the ship's reactor led to a fire and the release of radioactivity
- K-116, 1970: suffered a loss-of-coolant accident in the port reactor; substantial radioactivity released.
- K-64, 1972: the first Alfa-class liquid-metal cooled reactor failed; reactor compartment scrapped.
- K-222, 1980: the Papa-class submarine had a reactor accident during maintenance in the shipyard while the ship's naval crew had left for lunch.
- K-123, 1982: the Alfa-class submarine reactor core damaged by liquid-metal coolant leak; the sub was forced out of commission for eight years.
- K-431, 1985: a reactor accident while refueling resulted in 10 fatalities and 49 other people suffered radiation injuries.
- K-219, 1986: suffered an explosion and fire in a missile tube, eventually leading to a reactor accident; a 20-year-old enlisted seaman, Sergey Preminin, sacrificed his life to secure one of the onboard reactors. The submarine sank three days later.
- K-192, 1989 (reclassified from K-131): suffered a loss-of-coolant accident due to a break in the starboard reactor loop.

=== Other major accidents and sinkings ===
- USS Thresher (SSN-593), 1963: was lost during deep diving tests with 129 crew and shipyard personnel on board; later investigation concluded that failure of a brazed pipe joint and ice formation in the ballast blow valves prevented surfacing. The accident motivated a number of safety changes to the U.S. fleet. Thresher was the first of only two submarines to exceed 100 onboard deaths, joined by the Russian Kursk's 118 lost in 2000.
- K-3 Leninsky Komsomol, 1967: the first Soviet nuclear submarine experienced a fire associated with the hydraulic system, killing 39 sailors.
- USS Scorpion (SSN-589), 1968: was lost at sea, evidently due to implosion upon sinking. What caused Scorpion to descend to her crush depth is unknown.
- USS Guitarro (SSN-665), 1969: sank while pier-side in shipyard due to improper ballasting. The submarine was eventually completed and commissioned.
- K-8, 1970: a fire and a towing accident resulted in the sub sinking and the loss of all 52 crewmen remaining aboard.
- K-56, 1973: a collision with another Soviet vessel led to flooding of the battery well and many crew deaths due to chlorine gas.
- K-429, 1983: the sub sank to the ocean bottom due to flooding from improper rig-for-dive and shipyard errors but was later recovered; 16 crewmen were killed.
- K-278 Komsomolets, 1989: the Soviet submarine sank in Barents Sea due to a fire.
- USS Baton Rouge (SSN-689), 1992: collided with a Russian Sierra class submarine in Kildin Island, heavy damage caused it to be written-out and decommissioned.
- K-141 Kursk, 2000: lost at sea with all 118 crewmen on board; the generally accepted theory is that a leak of hydrogen peroxide in the forward torpedo room led to the detonation of a torpedo warhead, which in turn triggered the explosion of half a dozen other warheads about two minutes later.
- Ehime Maru and USS Greeneville, 2001: the American submarine surfaced underneath the Japanese training vessel. Nine Japanese crewmembers, students, and teachers were killed when their ship sank as a result of the collision.
- K-159, 2003: sank in the Barents Sea while being towed to be scrapped, killing nine crewmen.
- USS San Francisco (SSN-711), 2005: collided with a seamount in the Pacific Ocean. A crew member was killed and 23 others were injured.
- USS Miami (SSN-755), 2012: the submarine's forward compartment was destroyed by an arsonist-set fire while in shipyard, causing damage with an estimated $700 million in repair costs. While repairs were initially planned upon, due to budget cuts the boat was subsequently scrapped.
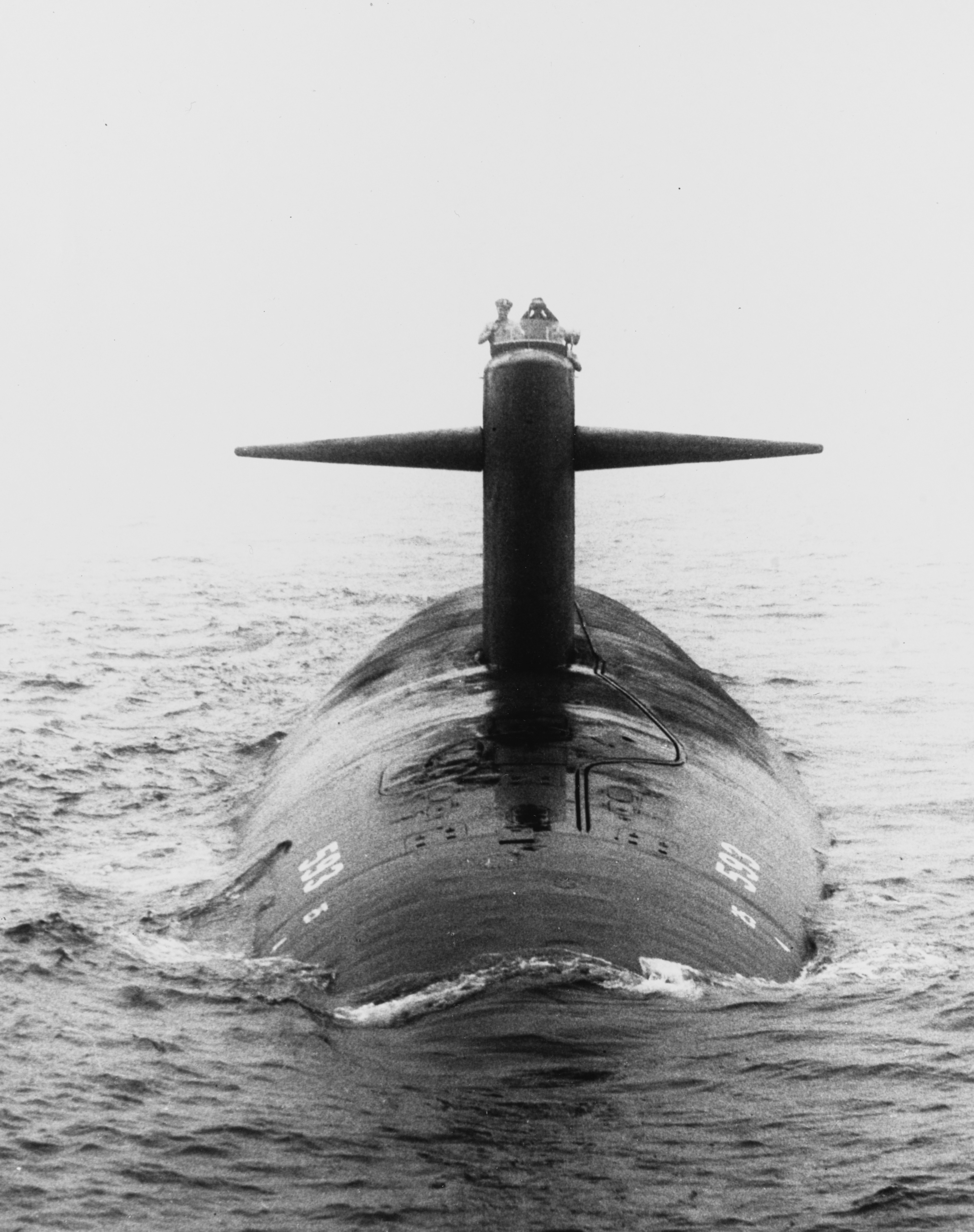
USS Thresher

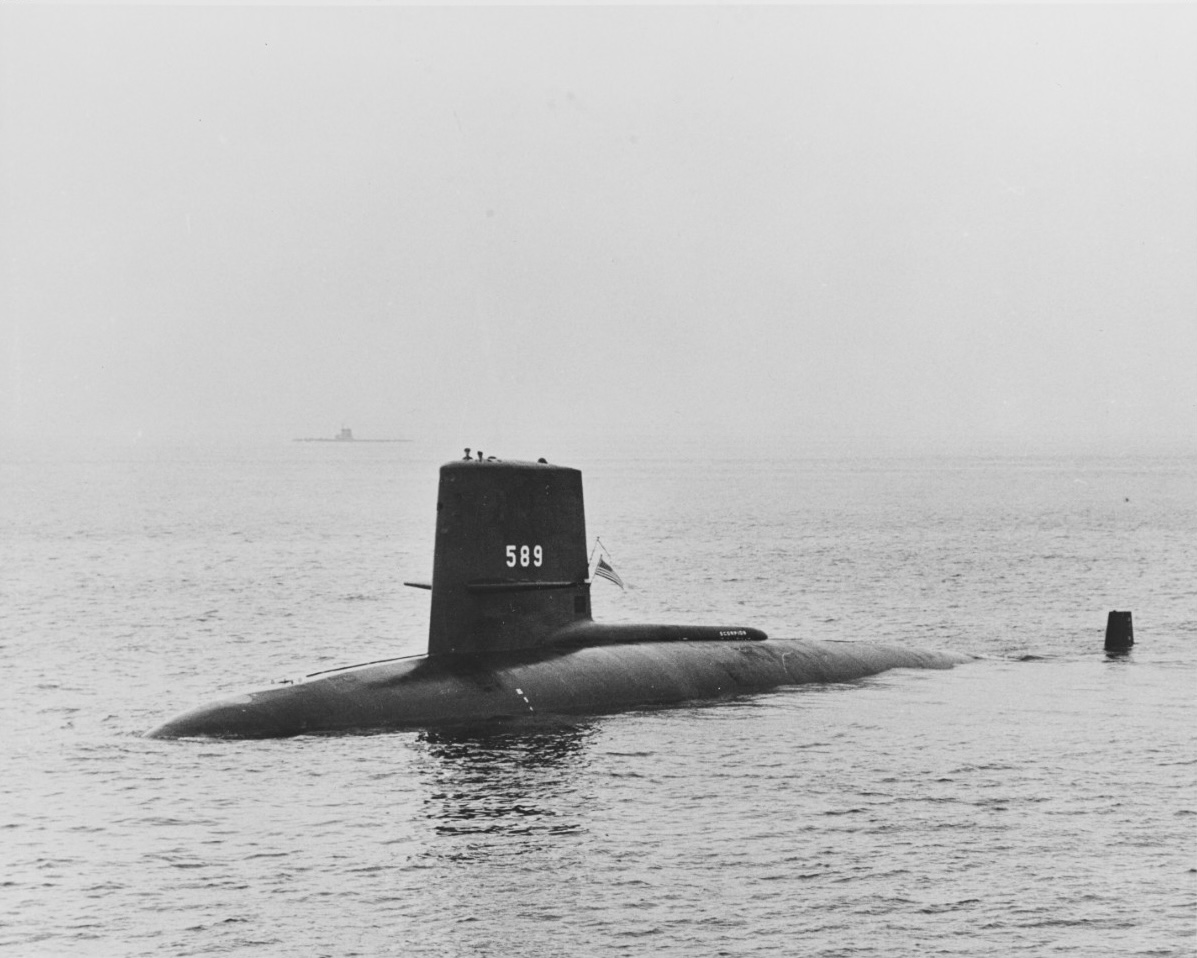
USS Scorpion

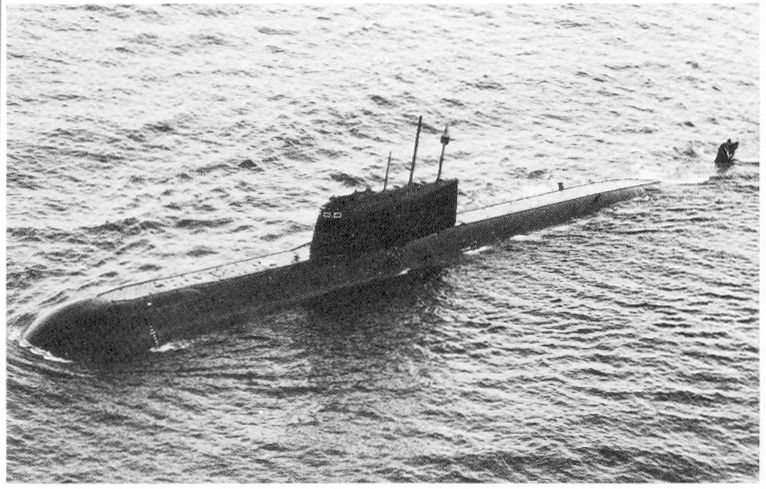
K-278 Komsomolets

== See also ==
- Attack submarine – Submarine designed to destroy other ships
- Ballistic missile submarine – Submarine that can launch ballistic missiles
- Cruise-missile submarine – Submarine capable of launching cruise missiles
- History of submarines
- List of lost United States submarines
- List of nuclear submarines
- Nuclear marine propulsion – Propulsion system for marine vessels utilizing a nuclear powerplant
- Nuclear-powered icebreaker – Type of ship
- SSN (hull classification symbol) – US Navy symbol for nuclear-powered attack submarines
- Submarine – Watercraft capable of independent underwater operation
