= Main Directorate of Deep-Sea Research =

Russian military organisation

The Main Directorate of Deep-Sea Research (Russian: Главное управление глубоководных исследований, transcribed as Glavnoye upravlenie glubokovodnikh issledovanii or GUGI) is a Russian agency belonging to the Armed Forces of the Russian Federation. It is one of the most secret parts of the navy. Its objective is to operate submarines that are able to dive deep into the sea, in order to gather intelligence or to work with installations on the seabed, including sabotage. Its original target was the Western surveillance systems of submarines from the Soviet Union and it is able to eavesdrop and sever the fiber optic cables crossing the seas. It also tests emergency equipment and does medical research on the physiology of diving.

The directorate is directly subordinate to the Ministry of Defense. Its headquarters is located in Saint Petersburg, and it operates a naval base in Olenya Bay on the Kola Peninsula. While independent of the navy, GUGI draws personnel from the 29th Separate Submarine division in Olenya Bay.

== History ==
The year of creation of the directorate is uncertain. 1963 (as military unit 90802), 1965, and 1976 have been mentioned.

== Military unit No 45707 ==
Created in Leningrad in October 1976 as the 10th detachment of hydronauts (Russian: 10-й отряд гидронавтов), Military unit No 45707 was in the special center of the Ministry of Defense in Moscow (Russian: Специальный центр Министерства обороны в Москве) but, since the early 2000s, military unit 45707 is subordinate to GUGI. Allegedly, Military unit No 45707 is headquartered at Petergof and is responsible for the testing and operation of deep-sea nuclear power plants by employing aquanauts, who are also known as hydronauts, in reconnaissance activities including maintaining Russian underwater communication cables, eavesdropping on submarine communication cables, installing underwater motion sensors, and collecting wreckage from ships, aircraft, and satellites off the seabed especially the remains of secret Russian equipment left over from tests or accidents. The bathyscaphes "Rus" and nuclear deep-water stations (AGS) "Losharik", "Nelma", "Kashalot", which work on the seabed at depths from 500 to 6000 meters, are in the 10th detachment of hydronauts (military unit 45707). According to Dmitry Kornev who is the editor of the MilitaryRussia.Ru website, hydronauts often conduct special missions in the Sea of Japan, the North Atlantic Ocean, and in the Arctic Ocean. The 15th Central Research Laboratory of the Ministry of Defense of Russia (Russian: 15-я центральная научно-исследовательская лаборатория Минобороны России (15 ЦНИЛ ВМФ)) supported military unit 45707 efforts.

== Commanders ==
Vice-Admiral Alexei Vitalyevich Burilichev (Russian: Алексей Витальевич Буриличев; August 13, 1958, Leningrad, RSFSR, USSR - November 25, 2020, Moscow), headed GUGI for fifteen years from 2005 until his death due to complications from coronavirus on 25 November 2020 and was replaced on 15 March 2021 by Vice-Admiral Vladimir Vladimirovich Grishechkin (born January 1, 1965, Tolyatti).

== Fleet ==
GUGI is in charge of submarines that can reach depths of 6000 meters. They are equipped with tools, cameras and lighting in order to carry out operations there. It has access and operates more than 50 ships, submarines and floating dry docks, which hide submarines from satellites.

- Evgeny Gorigledzhan
- Yantar, which can carry and repair several minisubmarines
- Belgorod (submarine)
- Vice-Admiral Burilichev sister ship of both Yantar and Almaz (Project 22010-class) and named in honor of Vice-Admiral Alexei Vitalyevich Burilichev who headed GUGI for fifteen years, and died in November 2020 due to complications from the coronavirus
- Nelma (submarine)
- Losharik, a 70-meter long atomic submarine that reaches 2000 meters and can be carried by Orenburg
- Khabarovsk (submarine)
- 2 special purpose mini-submarine of Paltus-class
- "X-Ray"-class boat AS-23 (Project 1851)

== See also ==
- Continental Shelf Station Two
- Ichthyander Project
- Amphibian Man, (Russian: Человек-амфибия) a Russian science fiction novel written in 1927 by Alexander Belyaev but published in 1928 by the magazine Vokrug sveta (Russian: Вокруг света) and in book form by Zemlya and Fabrika (Land and Factory) (Russian: «Земля́ и фа́брика» (ЗИФ))
- Amphibian Man, a 1961 Soviet science fiction film based upon the science fiction novel by Belyaev
- 12th Chief Directorate (Russian: 12-е Главное управление Министерства обороны России)
- Nyonoksa radiation accident
