= Olenya Bay =

Barents Sea, Murmansk Oblast, Russia

Coordinates: 69°12′51″N 33°22′12″E

Olenya Bay or Olenya Guba (Russian: Оле́нья губа) is a bay of the Barents Sea on the Kola Peninsula in the Murmansk Oblast, Russia. It is an extension of the Kola Inlet, which opens out to the north into the Barents Sea. The Pechenga River discharges into the bay.

== GUGI: 29th submarine division Military Unit 13090 ==
Map of the Northern Fleet bases

A Russian naval, formerly Soviet, base is located on the shores of the bay. During the Soviet era, the base, which is located at 69-13N and 33-23E and is 2 nautical miles (3.7 km; 2.3 mi) northwest of the Russian Shipyard Number 10 at Polyarny, was known as the "Olenya Guba Submarine Base, Olenya Bay, USSR". The base supports GUGI (Russian: Главное управление глубоководных исследований (ГУГИ), transcribed as Glavnoye upravlenie glubokovodnikh issledovanii or GUGI) with its objective to operate submarines that are able to dive deep into the sea, in order to gather intelligence or to work with installations on the seabed, including sabotage. It is part of the naval installation at Gadzhievo (also known as Skalisty) in the Murmansk Oblast, and is home port to submarine units of Russia's Northern Fleet including the 29th submarine division Military Unit 13090 (Russian: в/ч 13090) which was known as the 29th special purpose submarine brigade from 1979 until January 2018. The Russian vessel Yantar is often seen moored at Olenya Bay.

According to a 2008 article in Kommersant, the 29th special purpose submarine brigade included:

- 29th Separate Submarine Brigade (Olenya Bay) under the command of Commander Captain 1st Rank Nikolai Gritsevich (Russian: Николай Грицевич).
  - AS-13, a Project 1910 deep-sea nuclear power plant. In the fleet since 1986.
  - AS-15, a Project 1910 deep-water nuclear power plant. In the fleet since 1991.
  - AS-33, a deep-water nuclear power plant of Project 1910. In the fleet since 1994.
  - AS-21, a special-purpose nuclear submarine of project 1851. In the fleet since 1991.
  - AS-23, a special-purpose nuclear submarine of project 1851. In the fleet since 1986.
  - AS-35, a special-purpose nuclear submarine of project 1851. In the fleet since 1995.
  - AS-12, a Project 10831 deep-water nuclear power plant. In the fleet since 1997.
  - KS-129 Orenburg, a special-purpose nuclear submarine of project 09786. In the fleet since 1981. As of February 2008, Commander Captain 1st Rank Alexei Sokolov (Russian: Алексей Соколов) and under repair.

== Belgorod ==
In July 2022, the Belgorod, which is a sister ship of the Kursk that was home ported at Vidyayevo, joined the 29th submarine division.

== GUGI reactors ==
Okolnaya Bay (Russian: Бухта Окольная) is the location of undersea GUGI reactors. Near Severomorsk according to a Barents Observer article, support for nuclear weapons handling which possibly could be used for Poseidon drones deployed in the Barents Arctic region are located at Okolnaya Bay as well. According to a November 2016 Izvestia article, Okolnaya supports "Harmony-S" (Russian: «Гармония-С») for the system index "Harmony-NZ" (Russian: индекс «Гармония-НЗ») which uses robotic autonomous bottom stations (ABS) that are covertly installed on the seabed by special submarines.

== Hvaldimir ==
In May 2019 satellite views of the base taken from Google maps were republished noting pens that suggested military use of cetaceans at Olenya Bay, including possibly a tame beluga whale discovered in Northern Norway what has been dubbed Hvaldimir.

== See also ==
- Losharik
- Olenya air base which is located on the Kola Peninsula 92 kilometres (57 mi) south of Murmansk
