= Russian submarine Belgorod =

Russian nuclear submarine

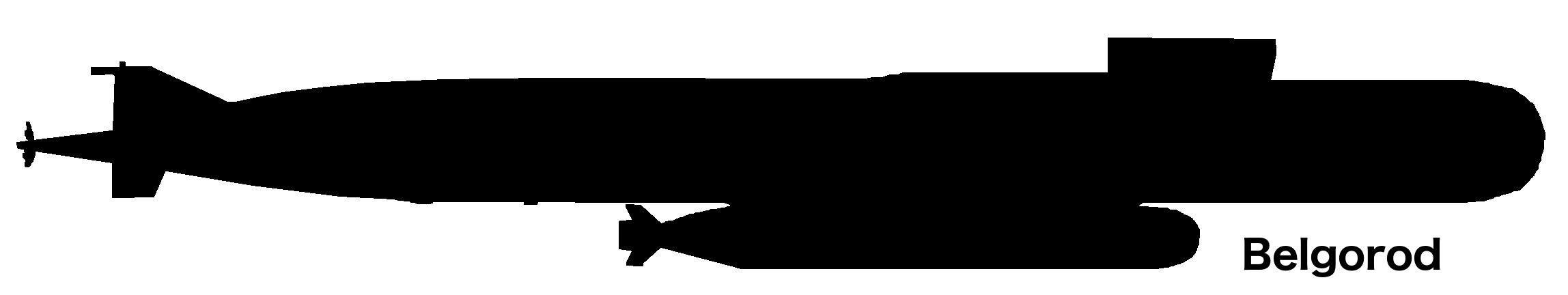

History

Russian Navy
- Name: K-329 Belgorod
- Namesake: Belgorod (City)
- Builder: Sevmash
- Laid down: 24 July 1992
- Launched: 23 April 2019
- Commissioned: 8 July 2022
- Status: in service

General characteristics
- Class & type: Oscar II-class submarine
- Type: Unmanned underwater vehicle submarine mothership, Poseidon platform
- Displacement: 14,700/17,000 tonnes surfaced; 24,000/30,000 tonnes submerged
- Length: 184 m (603 ft 8 in)
- Beam: 15 m (49 ft 3 in)
- Propulsion: 2 pressurized water reactor OK-650M.02 nuclear reactors, 2 × steam turbines delivering 190 MW (250,000 shp) to two shafts
- Speed: 32 knots (59 km/h; 37 mph) surfaced
- Range: Unlimited
- Endurance: 120 days
- Test depth: 500 to 520 m (1,640 to 1,710 ft) by various estimates
- Complement: 110 submariners
- Notes: Home port: Severodvinsk, Russia

K-329 Belgorod (Russian: БС-329 «Белгород») is a modified design of the Oscar II class (NATO designation) Russian nuclear submarine. It was laid down in July 1992 as a Project 949A cruise missile submarine, NATO designation Oscar II class. It was redesigned and the partly built hull was reconfigured as a special operations vessel, able to operate unmanned underwater vehicles. The vessel was relaid in December 2012. Due to chronic underfunding, its construction was suspended, then resumed at a low rate of progress before the ship was redesigned to become a unique vessel.

The K-329 Belgorod, along with the Poseidon unmanned underwater vehicle, was one of the latest weapons systems presented by Russian president Vladimir Putin during his annual speech in March 2018. It tested at sea in 1H2022 and was commissioned by the Russian Navy in July 2022. The submarine was delivered to the Russian Navy on 8 July 2022.

In light of the decommissioning of the last Typhoon-class submarine in 2023, the Belgorod is the world's largest operational submarine.

The Belgorod will reportedly be the first submarine to utilize the Poseidon.

== Construction ==
The submarine was laid down on July 24, 1992 at the Severodvinsk Shipyard as pennant number 664 of the Oscar II class cruise missile submarines.

In April 1993, submarine 664 received the name Belgorod after the Russian city with that name and the tactical designation K-139. In 1995, crew training began at the Obninsk-based 510th Naval Training Center, named after L. G. Osipenko of the Russian Navy (510-й учебный центр Военно-Морского Флота имени Л.Г. Осипенко). In 1997, construction was put on hold due to the severe economic crisis after the collapse of the Soviet Union, with the submarine three-quarters finished, mainly for financial reasons.

In January 1998, the crew was disbanded and the unfinished hull was mothballed. The loss of Belgorod's sister ship, the Kursk, in 2000 led to the decision to resume construction of Belgorod to replace Kursk, upgraded to Project 949AM specifications. By December 31, 2004 the hull was mostly complete, missing its powerplant, equipment and missile silos. The 100 million rubles provided by the Ministry of Defence was insufficient, and Sevmash was forced to use its own financial resources to make up for the deficit. Sevmash, on its own initiative, continued construction at a slow pace.

The construction of the Belgorod was included in the 2006 investment plan of the Ministry of Defence, but during a visit at the shipyard by Minister of Defence Sergei Ivanov on July 20, 2006, came the news that the decision has been made not to commission the submarine in the Russian Navy. By that time, Belgorod was about 80% complete. The Ministry of Defence considered other options to finish the submarine, including selling it to the Indian Navy, which would have financed completion of the vessel.

In 2009, re-designing the submarine and arming it with the cruise missiles originally developed for the Project 885 Yasen-class submarines was considered. In early 2012, the Commander-in-Chief of the Russian Navy, Admiral Vladimir Sergeyevich Vysotsky, stated that Belgorod would be completed as a "special projects" vessel. In December 2012, this specification received the official designation Project 09852.

The Project 09852 Belgorod refit began in 2012 in order to transport Losharik for GUGI operations from the 29th submarine division Military Unit 13090 base at Olenya Bay. The refit included both removing the cruise missile launch tube bay to make room for a new bay about 18 meters long that is capable of accommodating special operations submarines such as the Losharik or Paltus (Project 18510), (Note: Autonomous deep-sea stations of Paltus (Project 18510) include AS-23 (01429), which is a trial version. Later, the Project 18511, which is an improvement of the Project 18510, had two built: AS-23 (01430), and AS-35 (01430). The NATO classification is - X-Ray / Nelma - class.) and lengthening the bow bay to 38 meters to accommodate the new Poseidon nuclear-powered torpedoes. Belgorod may have a revolving launcher capable of accommodating six Poseidons. (Note: The Poseidon nuclear-powered unmanned underwater vehicle previously was known as the Canyon or Status-6. The torpedo, which was developed by the Rubin design bureau in St. Petersburg, is about 24 meters long with a diameter of 2 (estimated). The nuclear propulsion system is a small 8 megawatt liquid metal cooled reactor, which allows it to maintain a cruising speed of about 30 knots - equal to 55 km/h, with subsequent acceleration to 70 knots - equal to 130 km/h (early estimates of a maximum speed of 100 knots were later refuted).)

The submarine was planned for commissioning in the Navy in 2018. A crew was formed again in November 2018.

In April 2019, the Belgorod was taken out of the covered dry dock and put afloat. The commander of the ship at that time was Captain 1st rank Anton Alyokhin. In 2019, the sub was to complete its fitting out, nuclear reactor testing and sea worthiness trials. By June 2020, one source reported it "in service", though this appears to have been inaccurate. Others suggested it was still fitting out, possibly including sea trials. In January 2021, the director-general of the Russian Shipbuilder Sevmash, Mikhail Budnichenko, stated that tests on Belgorod were proceeding.

The plans to commission the submarine in the Russian Navy in 2020 and to introduce the Poseidon system in 2021 did not materialize. A press report by the official Russia state-owned TASS agency from April 2021 indicates a new objective from the Russian Defense Ministry to send the K-329 into service in the Pacific zone. This information could confirm the problems encountered with the Losharik submarine and the shift to the background of the operations envisaged on the Arctic continental shelf.

In April 2021, military analyst H. I. Sutton reported that the Belgorod was out of the water and had returned to the construction hall. On June 25, 2021, the Belgorod left the Severodvinsk shipyard for the first time on a trial regime by the builder Sevmash. The submarine was delivered to the Russian Navy on 8 July 2022.

The Belgorod joined the 29th Submarine Division. The division is a special formation, the operational arm of the Main Directorate of Deep-Sea Research (GUGI), which reports directly to the Russian Defence Ministry.

== Characteristics ==
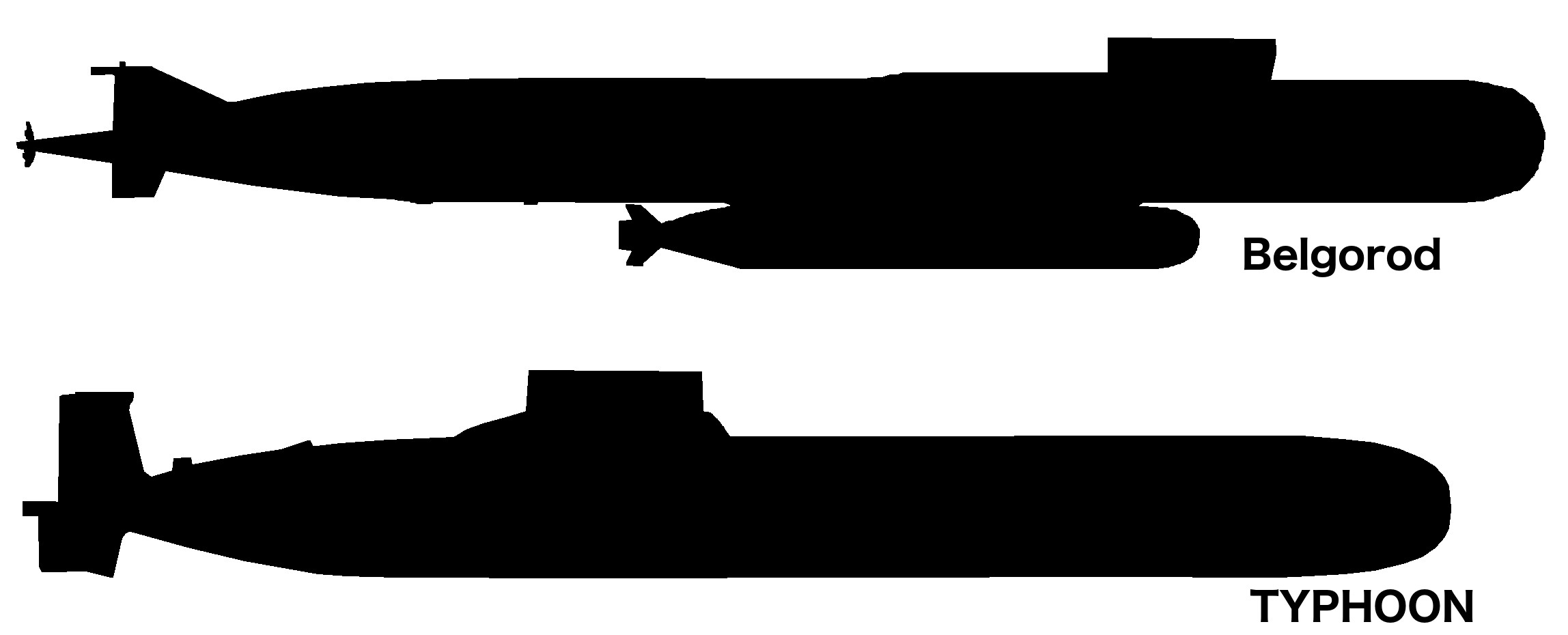
Size comparison between the Belgorod and a Typhoon-class submarine

=== Design ===
In the construction process, the original 154-meter long hull was lengthened to 184 meters, which is almost 11 m more than the Project 941 SSBNs - the world's largest submarines ever built, with a width of 18.2 meters. In June 2019, British military expert H.I. Sutton published satellite imagery of the Sevmash shipyard, which shows the K-329 Belgorod along with K-549 Knyaz Vladimir of the Borey project, with Belgorod visibly longer and wider.

=== Armament ===
In November 2015, the Status-6 Oceanic Multipurpose System project was revealed to the public. The initial designation of Status-6 has since been changed to Poseidon. The Russian weapon systems designation 2M39 and the NATO reporting name Kanyon has been assigned.

The Poseidon type remotely operated underwater vehicle has a 10,000 km range, can dive to a depth of 1,000 meters and is designed to deliver nuclear warheads for the destruction of coastal infrastructure as a second nuclear strike option («оружия ответного удара»). The motherships for the Poseidon underwater drones are planned to be the 09852 "Belgorod" project submarines, like the "Belgorod", and the 09851 "Khabarovsk" project submarines. According to publications by the Russian state news agency TASS, the submarines can carry up to six Poseidon vehicles at once. These were test launched in 2023.

=== Special activities platform ===
Some sources state that in addition to the Poseidon AUVs, the Belgorod type can operate as the mother ship for a single nuclear-powered mini-submarine of the 18511 project, otherwise known as Paltus type (Project 1851), used for the planting on the seabed of a self-contained mini-nuclear reactor of the ATGU 'Shelf' (АТГУ Шельф, abbreviation stands for Атомная турбогенераторная установка - Nuclear Turbo-Generator Device) type.

The ATGU Shelf is being developed for autonomous power generation of underwater sensor arrays. The submarine could piggy-back a single ATGU unit at a time, attached to its center deck section. The Belgorod is planned to operate the Clavesin-2R-RM («Клавесин-2Р-РМ», clavesin is Russian for Harpsichord) unmanned underwater sensor vehicles. The loss of the Losharik nuclear mini-submarine after a major fire in 2019 has caused a major setback for the Belgorod programme. At the same time, some sources suggest that the full entry into service of Poseidon may not occur on the submarine until around 2027.

== Special missions and intelligence gathering ==
The Belgorod Project is aimed at the development of a multi-role submarine platform with wide range of intelligence capabilities, in addition to its combat role. Among the strategic aims that have influenced the re-design of the K-329 Belgorod is the desire to set up and exploit the Arctic shelf as a major geo-strategy objective for the Kremlin in the short to medium term. This is mostly for the exploitation of energy resources in the High North, and for control of the increasingly important sea trade route through the Arctic Ocean due to the melting of the Arctic ice.

An example for this shift towards the Arctic region can be seen in a new project to modernize and deploy a network of sonar listening stations, positioned on the Arctic seabed (code name Harmony, Russian: Гармония). High-ranking officials at the Pentagon as well as officers from other NATO member states expressed their concerns between the end of 2015 and the end of 2017 about the Russian plans for undersea cables for telecommunications.

The new objective, in April 2021, from the Russian Defense Ministry to send the K-329 into service in the Pacific zone comes with rising military tensions in the North Pacific. At the time of the submarine's commissioning in July 2022, it was reported that she would operate in an initial experimental role with the Northern Fleet, before transferring to the Pacific. She was still deployed in the Northern Fleet operational area as of mid-2025.

== See also ==
- Khabarovsk-class submarine
