= Poseidon (unmanned underwater vehicle) =

2M39 Poseidon
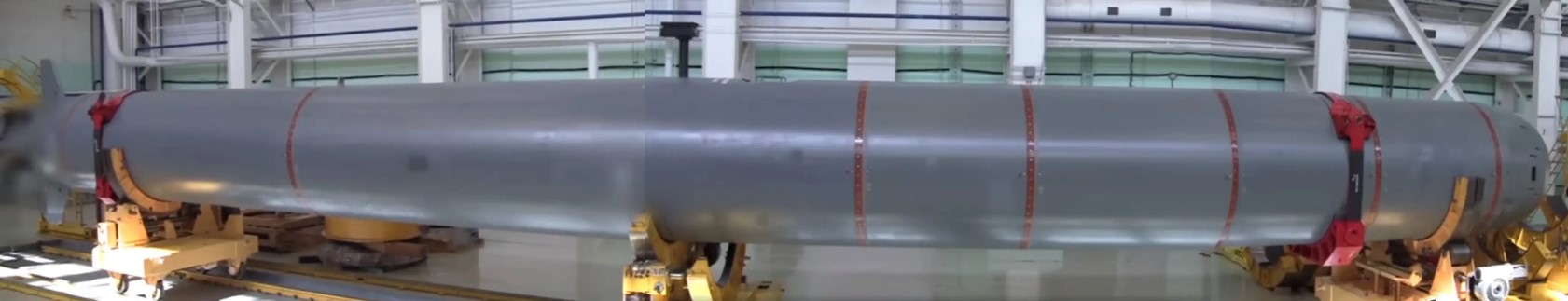
- The Poseidon torpedo, with classified propulsion system censored
- Type: Nuclear-powered, nuclear-armed UUV
- Place of origin: Russia

Service history
- Used by: Russia

Production history
- Designer: Rubin Design Bureau and other defence industrial enterprises of Russian Federation
- Designed: 2015
- Produced: 2023 – present

Specifications
- Mass: Up to 100 metric tons
- Length: Up to 20 m (65.6 ft)
- Diameter: Up to 2 m
- Blast yield: Speculated to be 2 Mt or more
- Engine: Liquid metal reactor At least 15 MW
- Transmission: Electric transmission
- Operational range: Unlimited
- Maximum depth: Up to 1,000 meters (3280 ft)
- Maximum speed: Up to 100 knots (185 km/h / 115 MPH)
- Guidance system: GLONASS satellite guidance, also AI guidance
- Launch platform: Submarine

External videos
- Poseidon Oceanic Multipurpose System on YouTube //
- Field tests of the Poseidon complex on YouTube //

The Poseidon (Russian: Посейдон, "Poseidon", GRAU index 2M39, NATO reporting name Kanyon), previously known by Russian codename Status-6 (Russian: Статус-6), is an autonomous, nuclear-powered unmanned underwater vehicle reportedly in production by Rubin Design Bureau, capable of delivering both conventional and nuclear warheads. The Poseidon is one of the six new Russian nuclear weapons announced by Russian president Vladimir Putin on 1 March 2018.

== History ==
On 10 November 2015, a page of a document that contained information about a secret "oceanic multi-purpose system" called "Status-6" was allegedly accidentally revealed by Russian NTV television channel. The leak happened during Russian president Vladimir Putin's speech denouncing American plans concerning "defensive" missile technology. The CIA has claimed the leak was intentional.

According to the Pentagon, Russia conducted the first test-launch of Poseidon on 27 November 2016, using the B-90 Sarov special purpose submarine. The test was reportedly carried out in the Arctic Ocean.

In early 2018, the Pentagon's Nuclear Posture Review publicly acknowledged development of Russia's "new intercontinental, nuclear armed, nuclear-powered, undersea autonomous torpedo". The system was officially named "Poseidon", following a public vote in March of the same year.

By January 2019, the Russian Navy announced plans to procure at least 30 Poseidon uncrewed underwater vehicles, deployed on four submarines, two of which would serve in the Russian Northern Fleet and two in the Pacific Fleet. The following month, Russian president Vladimir Putin declared that the key stage of trials of the system had been completed. This was followed by a video from the Russian Defence Ministry on 20 February, showing a Poseidon being test-launched by a B-90 Sarov special purpose submarine.

In early 2023 the first batch of the weapons had reportedly been manufactured, although some sources criticized the lack of an official confirmation or announcement from the Russian government.

In October 2025, Putin said that a Poseidon weapon had been successfully tested.

== Design speculation ==
=== Overview ===
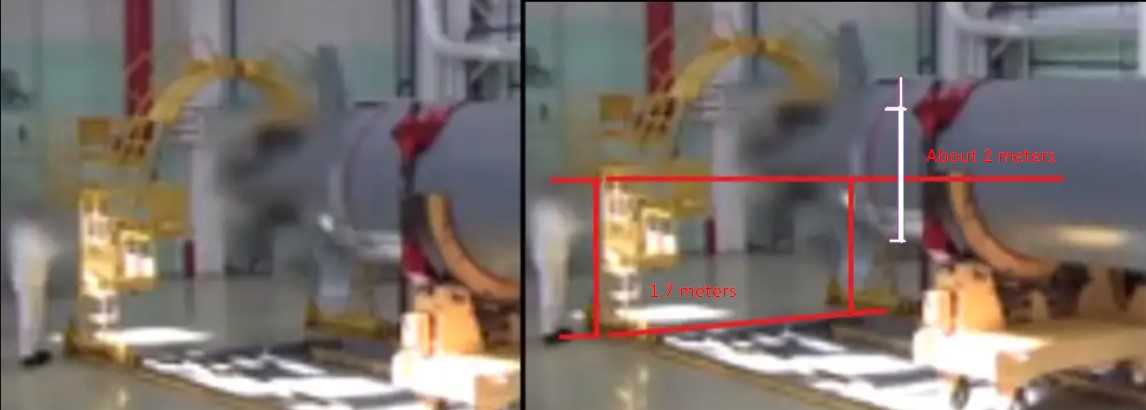
Estimated diameter of the Poseidon, about 2 meters

The Poseidon is intended to serve as response to U.S. withdrawal from the ABM treaty and to increase the Russian capability to overcome the U.S. missile defense systems, such as anti-ballistic missiles, etc.

The Poseidon warhead can contaminate a large area with radiation. For this purpose, the Poseidon is speculated to be equipped with a cobalt bomb. The Poseidon could be a radiological second strike weapon.

Normal (not salted) thermonuclear weapons cause radioactive fallout primarily through neutron activation of material at the detonation site. Unless the detonation happens at low depths in shallow waters, an underwater detonation will have its fallout greatly reduced, except for at the surface immediately above, near the base surge. Much of the radioactivity will be deposited in the sea, and be carried by ocean currents. Water (and air) will not form radioisotopes suitable for radiological warfare when neutron activated, however the seawater-salt will, and the seabed may.

If used against an aircraft carrier battle group, the battle group would have reduced chances of defending itself against it. The drone could detonate its very large warhead at standoff range, and anti-submarine warfare units would have very little time to react because of the speed at which it is speculated to travel.

=== Specifications ===
The Poseidon appears to be a torpedo-shaped robotic mini-submarine which can travel at speeds of 185 km/h (100 kn). More recent information suggests a top speed of 100 km/h (54 kn), with a range of 10,000 km (5,400 nmi; 6,200 mi) and a depth maximum of 1,000 m (3,300 ft).

Typical depth of the drone may be about 50–100 meters (160–330 ft) for increased stealth features in low-speed stealth mode. Low depth in stealth mode is preferred because sound waves move to ocean floor and reduce radius of detection. Submarines use the same strategy in silent running mode.

It is 1.6–2 metres (5–7 ft) in diameter and 24 metres (80 ft) long.

=== Body ===
Most likely, the high-strength body of the device is made of titanium alloys.

=== Powerplant ===
The National Interest compiled several unclassified defense sources from General Electric experts about the similar 601B project and they predicted low weight and compact gas-cooled nuclear reactor in the drone. Russian submarine designers say that a low-power reactor is preferred for Poseidon because a smaller reactor is less noisy.

=== Stealth technology ===
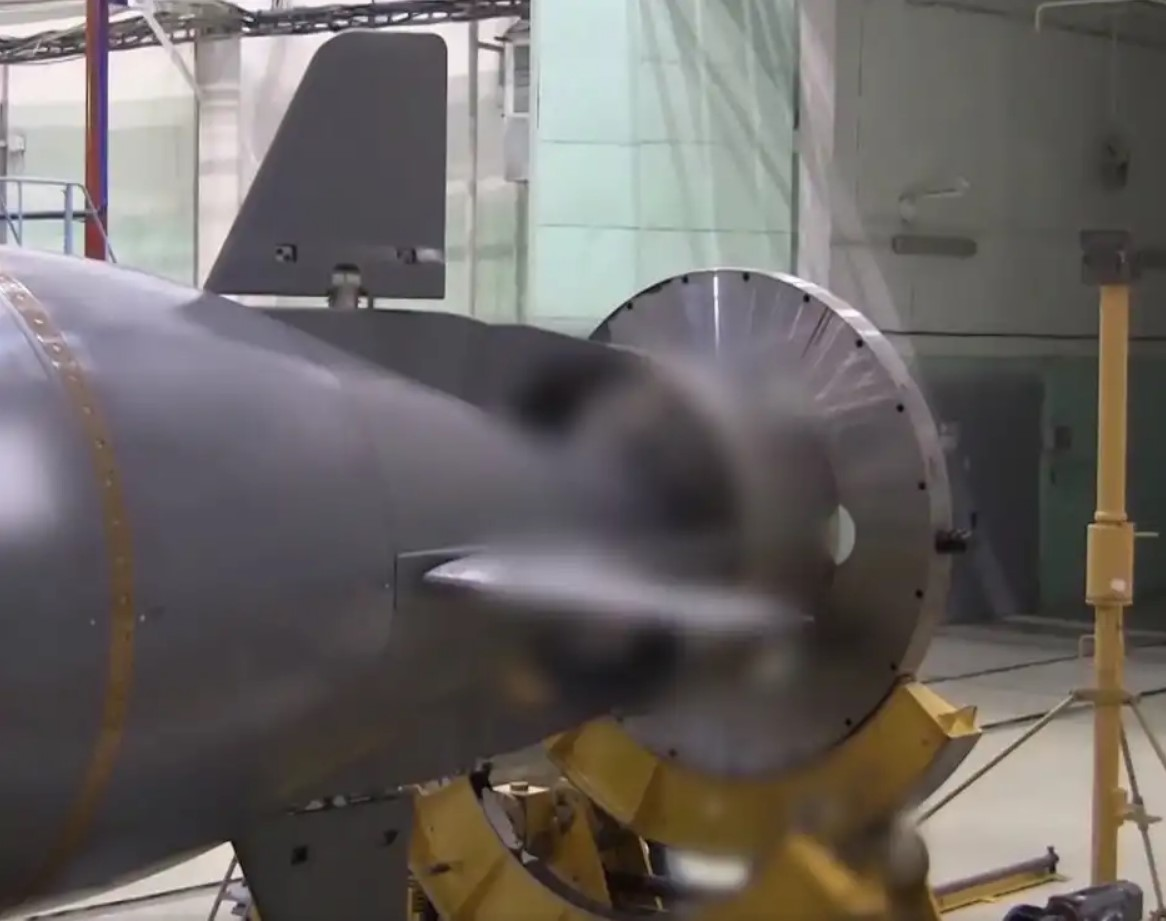
Pump-jet of the drone (obscured)

The development includes also use of stealth technology, to elude acoustic tracking devices. Poseidon uses a silent running strategy like other submarines. Its main stealth feature is its very low speed before it reaches the target area. Its high-speed mode activates upon reaching a short finish range (2–3 kilometers), when the probability of detection of the drone is considerably higher. It could travel for weeks toward enemy port cities, reaching high-speed only in the final stage.

Russian designers estimated the radius of detection of the drone will be about 2–3 km (1.2–1.9 mi) if travelling at 55 km/h (34 mph). A second important stealth feature of the drone is the special design of the pump-jet for clearance of the drone's acoustic signature to imitate the noise of civil ships.

Calculation of detection range for modern acoustic sonar of Virginia-class submarine
Speed of the drone (km/h)	Detection range (km)
37	1.7
55	3
74	29
93	43

A U.S. intelligence officer told CNBC that the Poseidon is difficult to detect and difficult to target in stealth mode.

=== Supercavitation ===
Poseidon is a family of drones, some of which are designed only for destroying coastal cities and thus rely on "stealth" capabilities rather than on high speed, others of which are primarily designed to attack carrier battle groups and were claimed to possibly harness supercavitation, like the VA-111 Shkval torpedo, to attain extremely high speeds (higher than 195 kn (361 km/h; 224 mph)) in attack mode. However, supercavitation devices have not been observed on the available footage of Poseidon. The Pentagon estimates maximum speed of the Poseidon to be about 56 kn (104 km/h; 64 mph) without the supercavitation option.

=== Launch platforms ===
The two ships speculated to carry the Poseidon are the Project 09852 modified Oscar-class submarine Belgorod and the Project 09851 Khabarovsk submarines. Oscar-class submarines could carry six Poseidon torpedoes at the same time for a total yield of up to 12-600 megatons.

According to some reports, Poseidon may have a seabed or mobile site launch option. In this configuration, known as Skif (Скиф) and patented by designer Alexander Shalnev, Poseidon can be staged on the sea floor in a special container as long as necessary. Russian auxiliary vessels Zvezdochka (Project 20180) and Akademik Aleksandrov (Project 20183), both of which feature ice-breaking capabilities, are involved in testing of Poseidon drones, indicating that these ships may be used as platforms for deploying and retrieving such a seabed version.

== Tsunami claims ==
In 2022, Russian domestic TV said Poseidon will be able to "plunge Britain into the depths of the sea". According to Russian claims, the Poseidon Torpedo may initiate a 500 metres (1,600 ft) high tsunami.

Various sources disregard these claims by pointing out the difference between a potential wave generated by the weapon and a naturally occurring tsunami. Large tsunamis are usually directed along one path, whereas an undersea explosion causes a wave to spread in 360°, which attenuates more rapidly with distance than a unidirectional wave does. As a comparison, the energy release that caused the 2011 Japan Tsunami was 163,000 times larger than Tsar Bomba, the upper estimate of Poseidon's possible power.

== Reactions ==
Following the Russian president Vladimir Putin's statements during his presentation of several new Russian super-weapons in March 2018, in which he specifically referenced the Poseidon as a weapon which could also target American port cities, U.S. Defense Secretary James Mattis stated Russia already had the potential capability of targeting certain port cities on the American coastline with missiles, and said thus Poseidon "does not change at all the strategic balance".

== Future users ==
Russia

- Russian Navy – more than 30 planned

== See also ==
- Anti-Ballistic Missile Treaty
- Avangard (hypersonic glide vehicle)
- 9M730 Burevestnik – a Russian nuclear-powered cruise missile
- Mutual assured destruction
- Nuclear torpedo
- K-329 Belgorod
- RS-28 Sarmat
- Tsunami bomb
