= List of nuclear and radiation accidents by death toll =

Nuclear and radiation accidents by casualties

There have been several nuclear and radiation accidents involving fatalities, including nuclear power plant accidents, nuclear submarine accidents, and radiotherapy incidents.

== List of accidents ==
Fatalities	Incident	INES level	Date	Details
200+ (short-term)	Kyshtym disaster	6	1957, September 29	An improperly stored underground tank of high-level radioactive waste exploded. Death count unknown, estimates range from more than 200 immediate deaths.
31-60 (short-term); 4,000-16,000+ (long-term, disputed)	Chernobyl disaster	7	1986, April 26	31 are believed to have been directly killed by the disaster (2 in the explosion and 29 due to radioactivity, 28 during the event and one in 2005). There are varying estimates of increased mortality over subsequent decades from 4,000-16,000. An additional 19 workers subsequently died between 1987 and 2004, which may be related. (see Deaths due to the Chernobyl disaster).
100 (disputed)	Windscale fire	5	1957, October 8	A 1988 UK government estimate estimated that there would be around 100 deaths by 2007 as a result of exposure to radioactive material from the fire. Subsequent epidemiological studies have failed to find any such rise in cancer cases, and criticised earlier estimates as lacking sound evidentiary basis.
1 due to radiation (disputed), 51 due to evacuation.	Fukushima nuclear disaster	7	2011 March	In 2018, 1 cancer death of a man who worked at the plant at the time of the accident was attributed to radiation exposure by a Japanese government panel. The government of Japan states that 51 people died due to the evacuation.
17	Instituto Oncológico Nacional of Panama		2000 August – 2001 March	Patients receiving treatment for prostate cancer and cancer of the cervix received lethal doses of radiation.
13	Radiotherapy accident in Costa Rica		1996	114 patients received an overdose of radiation from a cobalt-60 source that was being used for radiotherapy.
11	Radiotherapy accident in Zaragoza, Spain		1990 December	Cancer patients receiving radiotherapy; 11 fatalities and 27 patients were injured.
10	Soviet submarine K-431 reactor accident		1985, August 10	Reactor lid and control rods were lifted too far while adjusting position, resulting in criticality excursion. 49 people suffered radiation injuries.
10	Columbus radiotherapy accident		1974–1976	88 injuries resulting in 10 fatalities from cobalt-60 source due to incorrect calibration of a teletherapy unit.
9	Soviet submarine K-27 reactor accident		1968, May 24	83 people were injured due to uneven cooling of the reactor core, resulting in fuel element failures and multiple ruptures.
8	Soviet submarine K-19 reactor accident		1961, July 4	More than 30 people were over-exposed to radiation when the starboard reactor cooling system failed and the reactor temp rose uncontrollably. Emergency repairs ordered by the captain successfully cooled the reactor and avoided meltdown, but exposed the workers to high levels of radiation.
8	Radiation accident in Morocco		1984 March	At least 8 people died when an iridium-192 source used to radiograph welds became separated from its shielded container.
7	Houston radiotherapy accident		1980	An accident involving yttrium-90 in nuclear medicine therapy caused 7 deaths.
5	Lost radiation source, Baku, Azerbaijan, USSR		1982, October 5	A caesium-137 orphan source was carried by an individual in a clothes pocket, exposing several individuals. Five people suffered radiation burns and died; at least one other person suffered acute radiation sickness, and twelve others were exposed.
4	Goiânia accident	5	1987, September 13	249 people received a large radiation dose from a lost radiotherapy source.
4	Radiation accident in Mexico City		1962	Exposure to a cobalt-60 orphan source from an industrial radiographic device.
3	SL-1 accident (US Army)		1961, January 3	All three of the experimental reactor crew died when the reactor went prompt critical and the core explosively vaporized.
3	Samut Prakan radiation accident		2000 February	Three deaths and ten injuries resulted when a radiation-therapy unit was dismantled.
2	Tokaimura nuclear accident, Japan	4	1999, September 30	Two fatalities, and 667 people suffered exposure. during a criticality accident at a fuel reprocessing facility, due to improper handling of liquid uranium fuel.
2	Meet Halfa, Qalyubiyya Governorate, Egypt		2000 May	Two fatalities, five injuries, and seventy six others treated for changes to their blood, due to an iridium-192 orphan source.
1	Mayapuri radiological accident, India		2010 April	Eight hospitalized, with one fatality, from exposure to a cobalt-60 orphan source.
1	Daigo Fukuryū Maru		1954, March 1	Crewman of a Japanese fishing boat exposed to nuclear fallout from the Castle Bravo test.
1	Louis Slotin		1946, May 21	Criticality accident at Los Alamos National Laboratory in New Mexico with same plutonium bomb core as the Daghlian accident, known as the "demon core".
1	Harry Daghlian		1945, August 21	Criticality accident at Los Alamos National Laboratory in New Mexico with a plutonium bomb core, known as the "demon core".
1	Cecil Kelley criticality accident		1958, December 30	Criticality accident at Los Alamos National Laboratory.
1	Wood River Junction, Rhode Island		1964	Operator error at nuclear facility while recovering highly enriched uranium; Robert Peabody died 49 hours later.
1	Constituyentes Atomic Center		1983, September 23	Malfunction INES level 4 at RA2 reactor in Argentina, operator Osvaldo Rogulich died days later.
1	San Salvador, El Salvador		1989	One fatality due to violation of safety rules at 60Co irradiation facility.
1	Tammiku, Estonia		1994	One fatality from disposed 137Cs source.
1	Sarov, Russia		1997 June	One fatality due to violation of safety rules.
1	Lia radiological accident, Tsalenjikha, Samegrelo-Zemo Svaneti, Georgia		2001, December 2	One fatality due to unknowing exposure to a Soviet-era radioisotope thermoelectric generator.

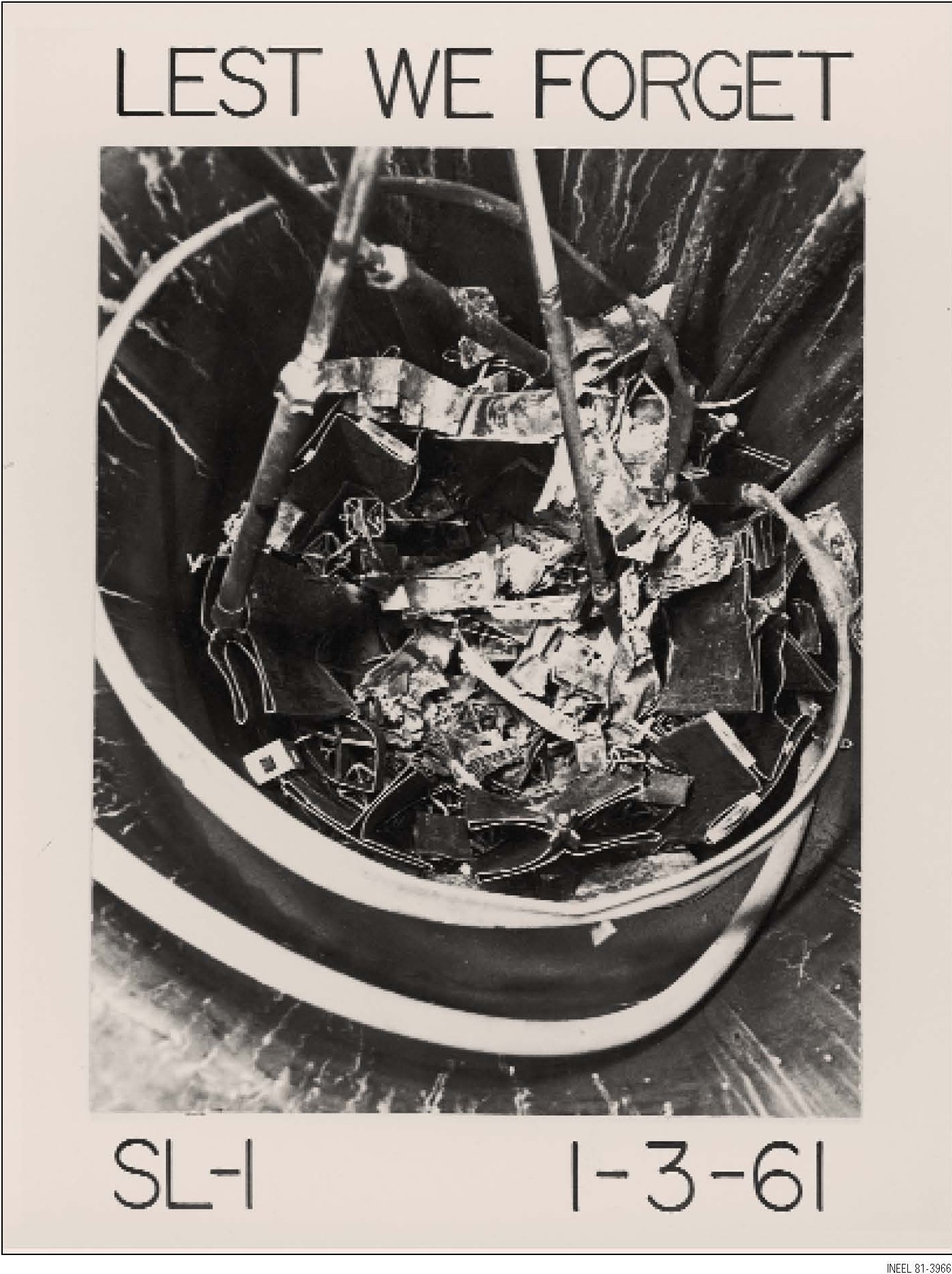
A safety poster designed for engineering offices depicting the melted SL-1 reactor core.

== Events with disputed fatality counts ==
=== Chernobyl disaster ===
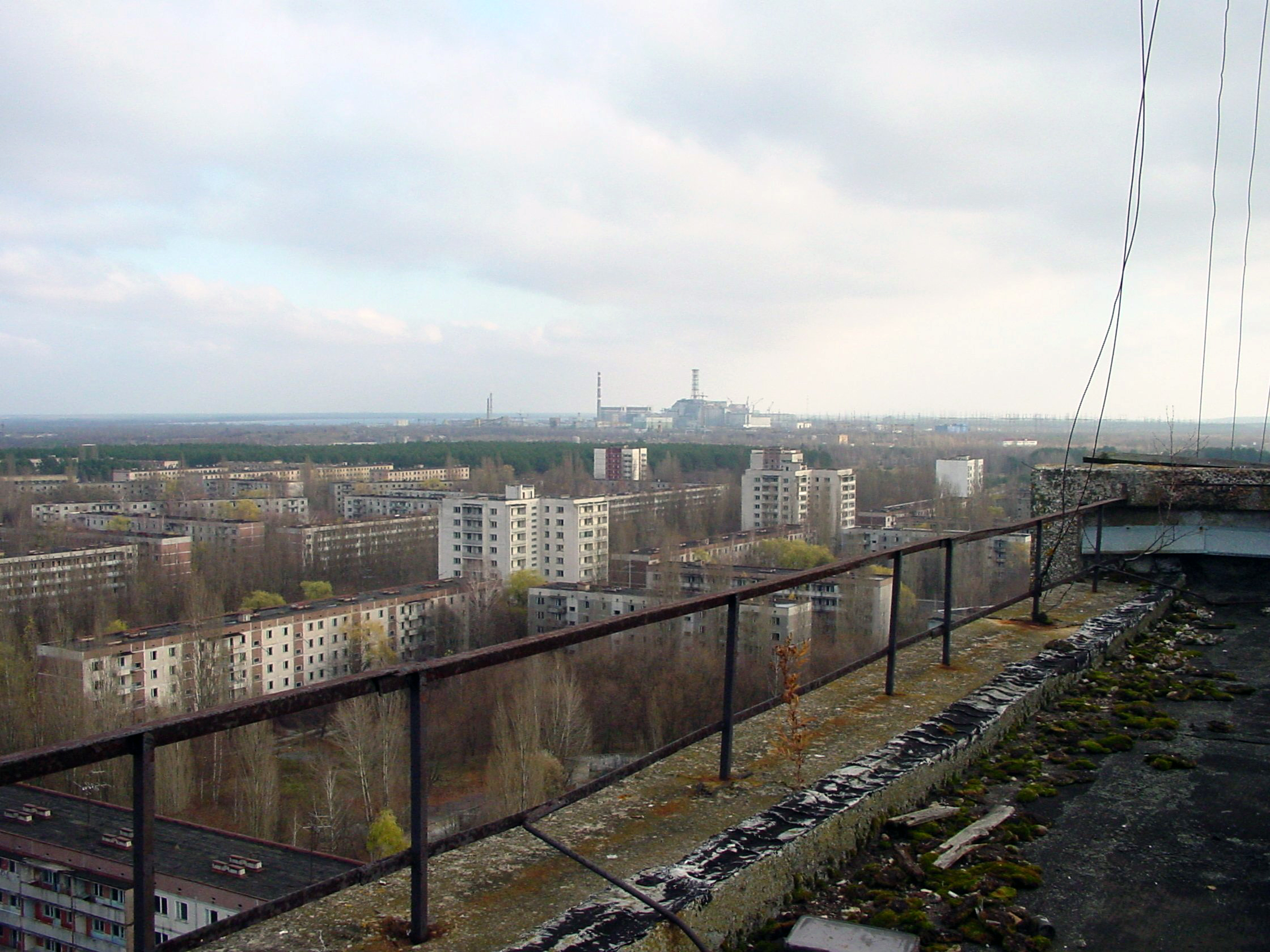
The abandoned city of Pripyat with the Chernobyl plant in the distance.

Estimates of the total number of deaths potentially resulting from the Chernobyl disaster vary enormously: A UNSCEAR report proposes 45 total confirmed deaths from the accident as of 2008. This number includes 2 non-radiation related fatalities from the accident itself, 28 fatalities from radiation doses in the immediate following months and 15 fatalities due to thyroid cancer likely caused by iodine-131 contamination; it does not include 19 additional individuals initially diagnosed with acute radiation syndrome who had also died as of 2006, but who are not believed to have died due to radiation doses. The World Health Organization (WHO) suggested in 2006 that cancer deaths could reach between 4,000 to 9,000 among the 600,000 most heavily exposed people, a group which includes emergency workers, nearby residents, evacuees, and residents of low-contaminated areas. A 2006 report, commissioned by the anti nuclear German political party The Greens and sponsored by the Altner Combecher Foundation, predicted 30,000 to 60,000 cancer deaths as a result of worldwide Chernobyl fallout by assuming a linear no-threshold model for very low doses. A Greenpeace report puts this figure at 200,000 or more. A disputed Russian publication, Chernobyl, concludes that 985,000 premature deaths occurred worldwide between 1986 and 2004 as a result of radioactive contamination from Chernobyl.

=== Kyshtym disaster ===
The Kyshtym disaster, which occurred at Mayak in Russia on 29 September 1957, was rated as a level 6 on the International Nuclear Event Scale, the third most severe incident after Chernobyl and Fukushima. Because of the intense secrecy surrounding Mayak, it is difficult to estimate the death toll of Kyshtym. One book claims that "in 1992, a study conducted by the Institute of Biophysics at the former Soviet Health Ministry in Chelyabinsk found that 8,015 people had died within the preceding 32 years as a result of the accident." By contrast, only 6,000 death certificates have been found for residents of the Tech riverside between 1950 and 1982 from all causes of death, though perhaps the Soviet study considered a larger geographic area affected by the airborne plume. The most commonly quoted estimate is 200 deaths due to cancer, but the origin of this number is not clear. More recent epidemiological studies suggest that around 49 to 55 cancer deaths among riverside residents can be associated to radiation exposure. This would include the effects of all radioactive releases into the river, 98% of which happened long before the 1957 accident, but it would not include the effects of the airborne plume that was carried north-east. The area closest to the accident produced 66 diagnosed cases of chronic radiation syndrome, providing the bulk of the data about this condition.

=== Windscale fire ===
The Windscale fire resulted when uranium metal fuel ignited inside plutonium production piles; surrounding dairy farms were contaminated. The severity of the incident was covered up at the time by the UK government, as Prime Minister Harold Macmillan feared that it would harm British nuclear relations with America, and so original reports on the disaster and its health impacts were subject to heavy censorship. The severity of the radioactive fallout was played down, and the release of a highly dangerous isotope during the fire, Polonium-210, was covered up at the time.

Partly because of this, consensus on the precise number of cancer deaths caused in the long term as a result of the radiation leak has changed over time as more information on the incident has come to light. Taking into account the impact of the release of Polonium-210 for the first time, a 1983 UK government report estimated at least 33 cancer fatalities as a result of the incident. An updated 1988 UK government report estimated that 100 fatalities "probably" resulted from cancers as a result of the releases over 40 to 50 years. In 2007, the 50-year anniversary of the fire, new academic research into the health effects of the incident was published by Richard Wakeford, a visiting professor at the University of Manchester's Dalton Nuclear Institute, and by former UK Atomic Energy Authority researcher, John Garland. Their study concluded that because the actual amount of radiation released in the fire could be double the previous estimates, and that the radioactive plume actually travelled further east, there could have been 240 cases of cancer resulting in 100 fatalities in the long term as a result of the fire. However, subsequent epidemiological studies have failed to find any such increase in cancer linked to the fire. A 2024 study criticised earlier estimates as lacking sound evidentiary basis.

=== Fukushima disaster ===
In a 2013 report, the United Nations Scientific Committee on the Effects of Atomic Radiation (UNSCEAR) stated the overall health risks from the Fukushima disaster to be far lower than those of Chernobyl. There have been no observed or expected deterministic effects. In pregnancies, there has been no expected increase in spontaneous abortions, miscarriages, perinatal mortality, birth defects, or cognitive impairment. Finally, there was no expected discernible increase in heritable disease or discernible radiation-related increases in any cancers, with the possible exception of thyroid cancer. However, the high detection rates of thyroid nodules, cysts, and cancer may be a consequence of intensive screening. In a 2015 white paper, UNSCEAR stated its findings from 2013 remain valid and largely unaffected by new information, and the new information further supports the statement that high thyroid detection is likely due to more intensive screening.

As of 2012 none of the workers at the Fukushima Daiichi site had died from acute radiation poisoning, though six workers died due to various reasons, including cardiovascular disease, during the containment efforts or work to stabilize the earthquake and tsunami damage to the site. In 2018 a worker in charge of measuring radiation after the meltdown, who was in his 50s, died from lung cancer; he had been diagnosed in 2016 and his death was attributed to his radiation exposure.

In contrast, an opinion piece in The Wall Street Journal cites a 2013 Japanese study, which concluded that mortality due to "evacuation stress" from the area around Fukushima had reached more than 1600. This includes deaths from suicide and lack of access to critical health care, but not from radiation, increased cancer, or any other direct result of the nuclear accident. The author also states these deaths occurred among people who had been evacuated from areas where the radiation posed little or no risk to their health, areas where they would experience less exposure than the normal amount received by residents in Finland.

There was a class action lawsuit brought by a few sailors from USS Ronald Reagan against Tokyo Electric Power (TEPCO) and GE. They claimed to be suffering severe radiation induced illnesses. Ronald Reagan was part of the operation "Tomodachi" to deliver essential supplies to devastated communities in the wake of the Tsunami on March 11, 2011. This lawsuit was dismissed.

== See also ==
- Lists of nuclear disasters and radioactive incidents
