= Project 20180 tugboat =

Russian tug boat class

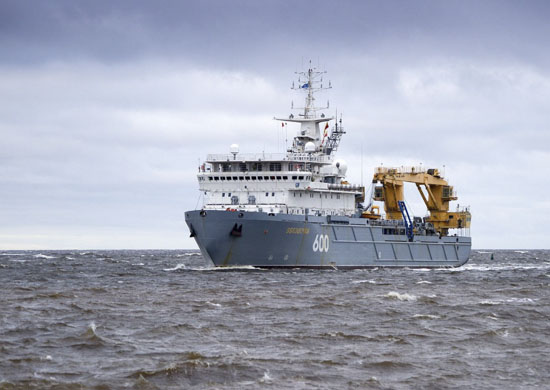
- Zvezdochka in 2022

Class overview
- Name: Project 20180
- Builders: Zvezdochka Shipyard, Severodvinsk
- Operators: Russian Navy
- Subclasses: Project 20181; Project 20183
- Built: 2004–present
- In commission: 2010–present
- Planned: 4
- Completed: 4
- Active: 3

General characteristics
- Type: Tugboat (Project 20180); Ammunition ship (Project 20181); Research vessel (Project 20183)
- Displacement: 5,500 tons (full load) (Project 20180); 6,300 tons (full load) (Project 20181); 5,400 tons (full load) (Project 20183)
- Length: 96 m (315 ft) (Project 20180); 107.6 m (353 ft) (Project 20181)
- Beam: 17.8 m (58 ft)
- Draught: 9.3 m (31 ft)
- Propulsion: 2 x 3265 hp KL6538В-AS06 electric motors; 4 x 1680 kW diesel-generators; 2 x 1080 kW diesel-generators; 2 x azipods; 2 x bow thrusters
- Speed: 14 kn (26 km/h; 16 mph)
- Capacity: 8 x ballistic missiles (Project 20181)
- Complement: 65 (Project 20180); 60 (Project 20181)
- Aviation facilities: 1 x helipad

Project 20180 is a series of seagoing tugboats in service to the Russian Navy.

== History ==
The construction of Akademik Makeev has been beset by numerous delays as a result of sanctions on the Russian shipbuilding industry. Intended to be commissioned in 2021, the vessel has not yet been launched as of April 2024. These sanctions had also affected her sister ship Akademik Kovalev, with the vessel's commissioning being delayed by three months, and the Russian Ministry of Defence seeking compensation from Zvezdochka Shipyard for the delay.

== Variants ==
- Project 20180 – Tugboat
- Project 20181 – Ammunition ship
- Project 20183 – Research vessel

== Ships ==
Name	Builder	Laid down	Launched	Commissioned	Fleet	Status
Project 20180
Zvezdochka	Zvezdochka Shipyard	3 September 2004	20 December 2007	24 July 2010	Northern Fleet	Active
Project 20181
Akademik Kovalev	Zvezdochka Shipyard	20 December 2011	30 July 2014	18 December 2015	Pacific Fleet	Active
Akademik Makeev	Zvezdochka Shipyard	23 July 2015	14 August 2025			Launched
Project 20183
Akademik Alexandrov	Zvezdochka Shipyard	20 December 2012	16 May 2017	23 January 2020	Pacific Fleet	Active

== Gallery ==
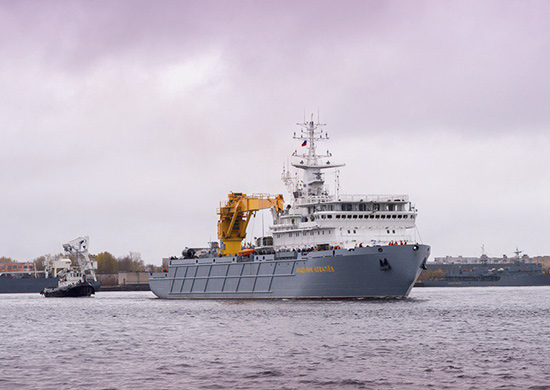
Akademik Kovalev in 2015

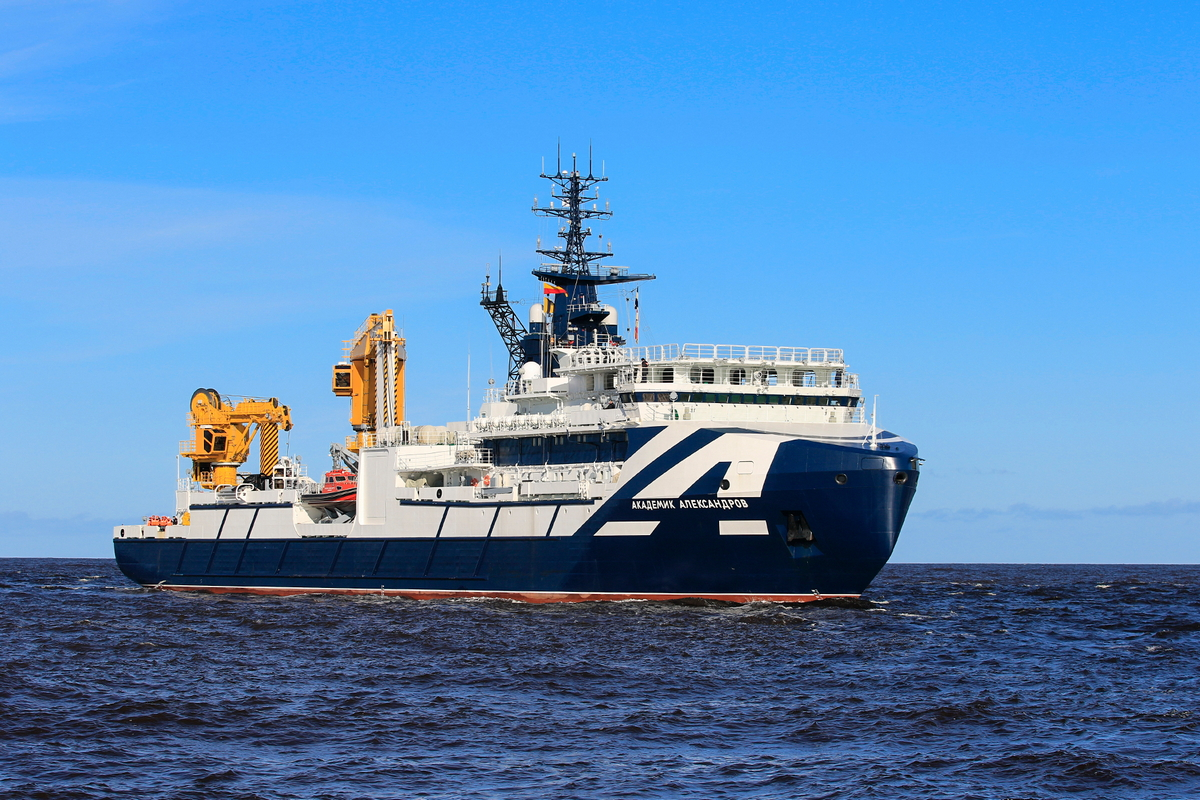
Akademik Alexandrov in 2020

== See also ==
- List of active Russian Navy ships
- Future of the Russian Navy
