= Russian submarine Sarov =

Russian special-purpose submarine

- Schematic drawing of the B-90 Sarov submarine

History

Russia
- Name: Sarov
- Namesake: Sarov
- Owner: Russian Navy
- Builder: Krasnoye Sormovo Shipyard; Sevmash Shipyard
- Laid down: 1989
- Launched: 17 December 2007
- Commissioned: 7 August 2008
- Status: In service

General characteristics
- Type: Special purpose submarine
- Displacement: Surfaced: 2300 tons; Submerged: 3950 tons
- Length: 98 m
- Draught: 7 m
- Installed power: Nuclear reactor
- Propulsion: Kristall-27 electrochemical generator
- Speed: 10–17 knots (19–31 km/h; 12–20 mph)
- Endurance: 45 days
- Test depth: 300 metres (980 ft)
- Complement: 52
- Armament: 2 x 650-mm torpedo tubes (?) and/or specialized torpedo tube for Status-6 Weapon

B-90 Sarov also referred to as Sarov class, Russian designation Project 20120 Sargan, is a Russian special purpose diesel-electric submarine that uses a nuclear reactor as a supplementary power generator. The existence of the submarine was first revealed in 2007, when details about the boat were accidentally published on the Sarov, Nizhny Novgorod region's local government website as part of an account of a meeting with its commander. It serves in the Russian Navy's Northern Fleet and is being used as a technology demonstrator for testing of upgraded weapons and military equipment or as an intelligence collection boat.

== History ==
Sarov was designed by the Rubin Design Bureau during the 1980s and its construction began in 1989 at the Krasnoye Sormovo Shipyard, Nizhniy Novgorod. In 1998, work on the submarine was stopped due to a lack of funding following the dissolution of the Soviet Union. After revision of the project, work reportedly continued at the Sevmash Shipyard, Severodvinsk from 2003 onwards. Sarov was launched in 2007 and commissioned in the Russian Navy in 2008. It is named after the city of Sarov.

== Design ==
Based on the Kilo-class submarine, it is a unique platform due to the combination of its diesel electric power system and a small nuclear reactor. It is believed the reactor does not drive the propeller itself, but rather produces electricity to recharge the conventional battery system, greatly extending the underwater endurance of the submarine. It has been noted that since electric propulsion is inherently very quiet, but tends to lack range, possession of a long range electrical system would make Sarov an excellent intelligence gathering platform. The Russian Defence Ministry has not revealed whether the boat is employed in this role.

Sarov has a crew of 52 and can stay submerged for up to 20 days. It has a maximum speed of 10 knots (19 km/h; 12 mph) on surface, while 17 knots (31 km/h; 20 mph) when submerged and can operate up to 300 metres (980 ft) depth. Due to the addition of a nuclear reactor section behind the submarine's sail and an escape capsule in the sail, Sarov is significantly longer (98 m) compared to the length of the original Kilo-class submarines (72 m).

== Operational history ==
On 27 November 2016, Sarov was allegedly involved in a testing of the Russia's nuclear-powered, nuclear-armed Poseidon unmanned underwater vehicle, according to the Pentagon officials.

On 20 February 2019, Russian Defence Ministry released a video showing the Poseidon unmanned underwater vehicle as it is being launched out of a torpedo compartment aboard Sarov.
