= Khabarovsk-class submarine =

Series of Russian nuclear-powered submarines

Class overview
- Name: Khabarovsk class
- Builders: Sevmash

General characteristics
- Type: SSN/SSGN
- Displacement: Surfaced: 10,000 tons
- Length: 113 m to 135-140 m
- Beam: 10+ m to 13.5 m
- Installed power: Nuclear reactor
- Range: Unlimited
- Armament: 6 x Poseidon drones

The Khabarovsk class, or Project 09851 is a class of nuclear submarines under construction for the Russian Navy.

== Development ==
The lead submarine Khabarovsk was slated to be floated in June 2020. However, the launch was delayed till 2025. This class of submarines is based on the Borei-class submarine's hull, but is significantly smaller as it does not have the ballistic missile section. Surface displacement is reported to be about 10,000 tons. The class is intended to carry six Poseidon long-range nuclear torpedoes, and will be the second submarine to carry this weapon after Belgorod. The class is also likely to carry anti-ship and land-attack missiles, in addition to torpedoes.

== Characteristics ==
A limited data available from open sources suggest the following specifications for the submarine:

- length — 113 m to 135-140 m
- width — 10+ m to 13.5 m
- displacement — 10 000 tons
- underwater speed — up to 30-32 knots
- operational depth — up to 500 m
- crew — 100 seamen
- mission duration — 90-120 days

== Units ==
According to the open sources, a total of three or four submarines have been ordered. However, while some sources suggest all the submarines are of the same class (Project 09851), others suggest that the follow-on boats could be from a separate class (09853).

Italics indicate estimated dates

#	Name	Project	Laid down	Launched	Commissioned	Fleet	Status	Notes
	Khabarovsk	09851	27 July 2014	1 November 2025 (ceremonial "launch"; lowered into the water on November 30)	2026/27	Pacific	Sea trials as of August 2026	Dedicated support facility for the submarine being constructed in the Pacific region as of 2026
	Orenburg	09853	Fall 2025			Northern	Under construction	
	?	09851 or 09853					Planned	
