= Paltus-class submarine =

Russian mini-submarine

The Paltus-class submarine is a Russian special purpose mini-submarine of project 1851.1. Two boats were completed - AS-21 and AS-35 as a follow-up of the single "X-Ray"-class boat AS-23 (Project 1851). They are both part of the 29th special submarine squadron at Olenya Guba.

The surface displacement is approximately 300 tons with a length of 98 feet (30 m). The propulsion comes from nuclear power with the operating depth in excess of 3,800 feet (1,200 m). The designer, according to Polmar was Sergei Bavilin who had designed the earlier diesel electric Project 865/Piranya small submarine of similar dimensions.

"Paltus" means halibut in Russian.

== See also ==
- List of submarine classes in service
