= Russian submarine Losharik =

Russian deep-water nuclear submarine

History

Russia
- Builder: Sevmash, Severodvinsk
- Laid down: 1988
- Launched: 13 August 2003
- In service: 2010?
- Nickname(s): "Losharik"
- Status: Status unclear; may have reactivated as of 2025/26

General characteristics
- Class & type: Project 210 submarine
- Displacement: 1600 tonnes (surfaced); 2100 tonnes (submerged)
- Length: 60 m or 70 m (unconfirmed)
- Propulsion: 1 nuclear reactor E-17 (15 MW)
- Test depth: 2,000–2,500 metres (6,600–8,200 ft) depth in the Arctic Ocean in 2012
- Complement: 25 (estimated), all officers

Project 210, Project 10831 or AS-31 (Russian: АС-31), nicknamed Losharik (Russian: Лошарик, IPA: [lɐˈʂarʲɪk]), is a Russian deep-diving nuclear powered submarine. On 1 July 2019, a fire broke out on the vessel while it was taking underwater measurements of the sea floor in Russian territorial waters.

АС stands for Атомная Станция (Atomnaya Stantsiya), from the Russian naval term атомная глубоководная станция, 'nuclear deepwater station'. The submarine is also known as AS-12, but this number is assigned to another vessel.

== History and features ==
The submarine was laid down in 1988, but it was not launched until August 2003 due to financial problems, as well as the collapse of the Soviet Union. It is designated for research, rescue, and special military operations and is operated by the Main Directorate of Deep-Sea Research, (Главное управление глубоководных исследований (GUGI)), reporting to the Russian Defence Ministry.

Titanium spheres

The pressure hull of the submarine is believed to be formed from up to seven interconnected titanium spherical elements; this limits space for living quarters and equipment, but grants increased structural strength. The vessel is powered by a nuclear reactor, and its exact operational depth is not in public information. It is known to have operated at about 2,000–2,500 metres (6,600–8,200 ft) depth in the Arctic Ocean in 2012 and is capable of being carried by a modified Delta III-class submarine.

The vessel has been described as a "spy submarine" that could possibly be used to tap into or sever underwater telecommunications cables. Russia has released little information about it officially and there are few photographs of it; the clearest is believed to have been taken inadvertently during a Top Gear Russia photo-shoot in Arkhangelsk.

The nickname Losharik comes from the vessel's multi-spherical hull and was taken from a character in the Soviet animated film Losharik, a toy horse consisting of small spheres. The word losharik is a portmanteau of "лошадь" (loshad, 'horse') and "шарик" (sharik, 'small sphere'). The NATO reporting name for this submarine is NORSUB-5.

The vessel was referred to in a United States Northern Command briefing as a "dark target" whose activities should be tracked.

The Project 09852 modified Oscar-class submarine Belgorod, was specially refitted beginning in 2012 in order to transport Losharik, in support of GUGI operations. The refit included both removing the cruise missile launch tube bay to make room for a new bay about 18 meters long that is capable of accommodating special operations submarines such as the Losharik or Paltus and lengthening the bow bay to 38 meters to accommodate the new Poseidon nuclear-powered torpedoes. Belgorod may have a revolving launcher capable of accommodating six Poseidons. (Note: The Poseidon nuclear-powered unmanned underwater vehicle previously was known as the Canyon or Status-6. The torpedo, which was developed by the Rubin design bureau in St. Petersburg, is about 24 meters long with a diameter of 2 (estimated). The nuclear propulsion system is a small 8 megawatt liquid metal cooled reactor, which allows it to maintain a cruising speed of about 30 knots - equal to 55 km/h, with subsequent acceleration to 70 knots - equal to 130 km/h (early estimates of a maximum speed of 100 knots were later refuted).)

== 2019 fire ==
A fire broke out on the vessel on 1 July 2019 while it was taking underwater measurements of the sea floor in Russian territorial waters. Fourteen of the crew were killed by inhalation of smoke or toxic fumes. Seven of those who died held the rank of first rank captain and two were recipients of the Hero of the Russian Federation award. Submarine commander Denis Dolonsky was among those killed. The presence of such a high-ranking crew on a single vessel may be an indication that the vessel was carrying out a high-risk task or testing a new capability at the time of the accident. In comparison, submarine Kursk – which was lost with all hands after a similar disaster – had 118 crew members of whom only two held the rank of captain 1st rank.

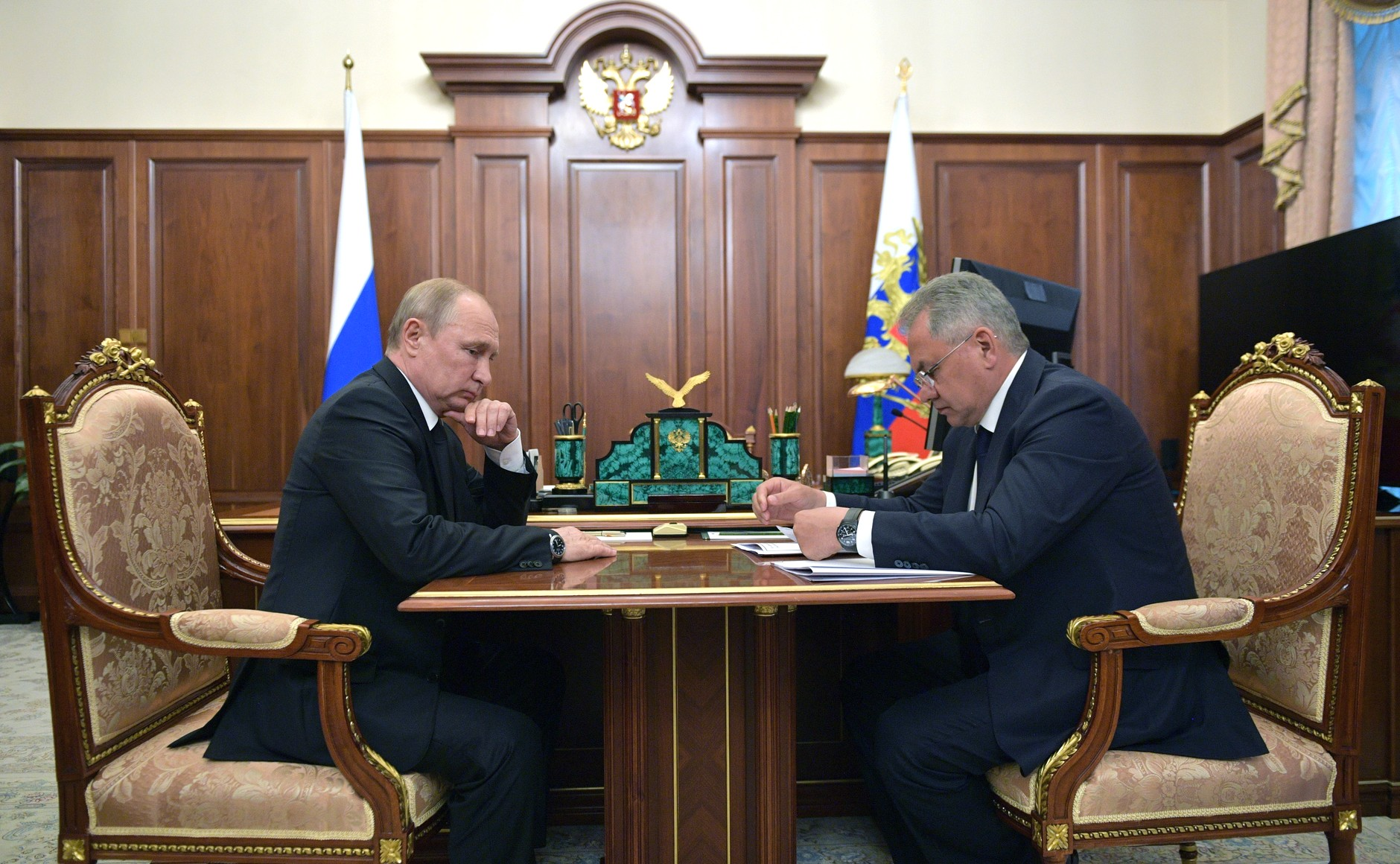
Defense Minister Sergey Shoygu reporting to Vladimir Putin on the fire

The fire broke out at around 8:30 p.m. MT, reportedly at the depth of 300 meters (980 ft), and was extinguished by the crew. Fishermen in Ura Bay reported that they saw a submarine surface rapidly at around 9:30 p.m. and meet a navy ship and two tugs. Losharik was later towed to the Russian Northern Fleet base at Severomorsk where five survivors were hospitalised with smoke poisoning and concussions. One civilian was present aboard the vessel at the time of the accident and survived after being moved to a less-affected part of the submarine.

Initial reports indicated that Losharik was not attached to its mother submarine when a fire broke out in its battery compartment and that only 5 crewmembers were on watch at the time of the accident with the rest allegedly asleep, as a result only the 5 crewmembers who were on watch managed to don the portable breathing kits in time. Later reports disagree stating that Losharik was either attached to the mother submarine at the time of the fire (reports disagree somewhat whether it was BS-136 Orenburg or BS-64 Podmoskovye), or in the process of docking with the mother submarine which was successfully completed despite the fire. Crewmembers fought the fire for over 40 minutes and then requested permission to evacuate to the mother submarine when the oxygen supply in their portable breathing devices ran out. Allegedly, at some point it appears that the mother submarine sent a 4-man rescue team to the submarine, possibly the 4 crewmembers who received the Hero of the Russian Federation award after the incident (Voskresenskiy, Somov, Oparin, Solovyev), in order to assist the crew aboard Losharik. Other sources seem to suggest Solovyev allegedly evacuated the sole civilian from Losharik. In total 5 crewmembers (allegedly all from Losharik) are believed to have survived the incident. In addition to the fire, at least one explosion occurred aboard Losharik during the incident. As the situation deteriorated the crew of the mother submarine feared that the mother submarine could be in danger as well and isolated itself from Losharik. One source states that the crew flooded Losharik. However, it is unknown whether this could be accomplished from the mother submarine. Other sources confirm that flooding did occur but that it was caused by the explosion which damaged/breached Losharik's hull. Initial assessment suggest that the submarine's operations compartments were heavily damaged with the radio-electronic equipment, automatics, acoustics, navigation equipment and life support system destroyed. The engineering compartments containing the nuclear reactor were allegedly intact.

The incident was the worst loss of life on a Russian submarine since the 2008 K-152 Nerpa accident which killed 20 men. The commander-in-chief of the Russian Navy Nikolai Yevmenov launched an investigation into the cause of the fire, and President Vladimir Putin sent Defense Minister Sergey Shoygu to monitor the investigation and report on the incident. On 2 July, Shoygu reported on the fire to Putin, the Supreme Commander-in-Chief of the Russian Armed Forces, at a meeting in the Kremlin. Initially, some media outlets complained that the Russian Government was attempting to cover up the accident, drawing parallels to the submarine Kursk disaster; some went as far as comparing the event to the Chernobyl disaster, even though the incident was reported to the public one day after it took place.

Some journalists speculated that the men who died had sacrificed themselves to save the vessel by sealing themselves into the compartment where the fire broke out. On 7 July 2019 at the sailors' funeral, Captain Sergei Pavlov, an aide to the Russian Navy head, proclaimed the crew "prevented a planetary catastrophe". The Norwegian Radiation Protection Authority stated that they had been notified by the Russians of a gas explosion aboard the vessel, though Russian authorities denied this.

On 4 July, it was announced that the fire had originated in the battery compartment. Defence Minister Sergey Shoygu also said that the submarine was nuclear-powered, but that the reactor had been isolated from the fire. According to Shoygu, the submarine could be repaired and returned to service.

On 5 July, four members were posthumously awarded Hero of Russia while ten members were posthumously awarded Order of Courage.

=== Fatalities ===
The following sailors were killed in the 1 July 2019 incident:

Captain 1st Rank

- Denis Dolonskiy, The commanding officer of the submarine, Hero of Russia, awarded two Orders of Courage (including one posthumously), Order of Naval Merit
- Konstantin Ivanov, awarded two Orders of Courage (one posthumously), Order of Military Merit
- Andrey Voskresenskiy, Hero of Russia (posthumously), three Orders of Courage, Order of Military Merit. He was a son-in-law of the Chief of Sosnovy Bor Naval Training Centre for Nuclear Submarine Crews Counter admiral Vladimir Bederdinov
- Konstantin Somov, Hero of Russia (posthumously), three Orders of Courage
- Denis Oparin, Hero of Russia (posthumously), Order of Courage. He was a son of the chief of the submarine division that included Losharik, Alexander Oparin
- Vladimir Abankin, awarded two Orders of Courage (one posthumously)
- Nikolay Filin, test pilot of military deep-diving crewed submersibles, Hero of Russia (2018), awarded four Orders of Courage (including one posthumously), Order of Military Merit

Captain 2nd Rank

- Alexander Avdonin, awarded two Orders of Courage (one posthumously)
- Dmitriy Solovyov, Hero of Russia (posthumously)
- Sergey Danilchenko, awarded two Orders of Courage (one posthumously)

Captain 3rd Rank

- Viktor Kuzmin, awarded Order of Courage (posthumously)
- Vladimir Sukhinichev, awarded Order of Courage (posthumously)

Other Crew

- Lieutenant Captain Mikhail Dubkov, awarded Order of Courage (posthumously)
- Lieutenant Colonel of Medical Service Alexandr Vasilyev, awarded Order of Courage (posthumously)

All 14 seamen were buried in Serafimovskoe Cemetery, Saint Petersburg, Russia on 6 July 2019.

=== Cause of fire ===
Forensic investigation has shown that the fire started with a massive explosion in the submarine's battery compartment. Burning batteries fuelled the fire despite the best efforts of the crew. Losharik was designed to use silver-zinc batteries made in Ukraine. After the worsening of Russia–Ukraine relations caused by the War in Donbas, the batteries were substituted with lithium-ion batteries produced by Saint Petersburg company Rigel (Russian: Ригель) that were certified for use in submarines. Investigators are checking whether the safety testing of those batteries was sufficient. The other hypotheses include unexpected loads on the batteries caused by a short circuit somewhere on the submarine, or sabotage. Due to its unique top secret design, and possibly secretive mission, the Russian government has been tight-lipped about the incident, as have the American and Norwegian governments who may have surveilled the incident.

Major repair work on the submarine was reported to be underway in 2020. The submarine had been expected to remain out of service until 2024 or 2025, though in 2025 it was reported that the commencement of post-refit sea trials may have begun in 2025. Unconfirmed reports suggested that the submarine might have returned to operations as of 2026.

== See also ==
- Seabed warfare
