= Russian landing ship Nikolai Vilkov =

Russian Navy landing ship

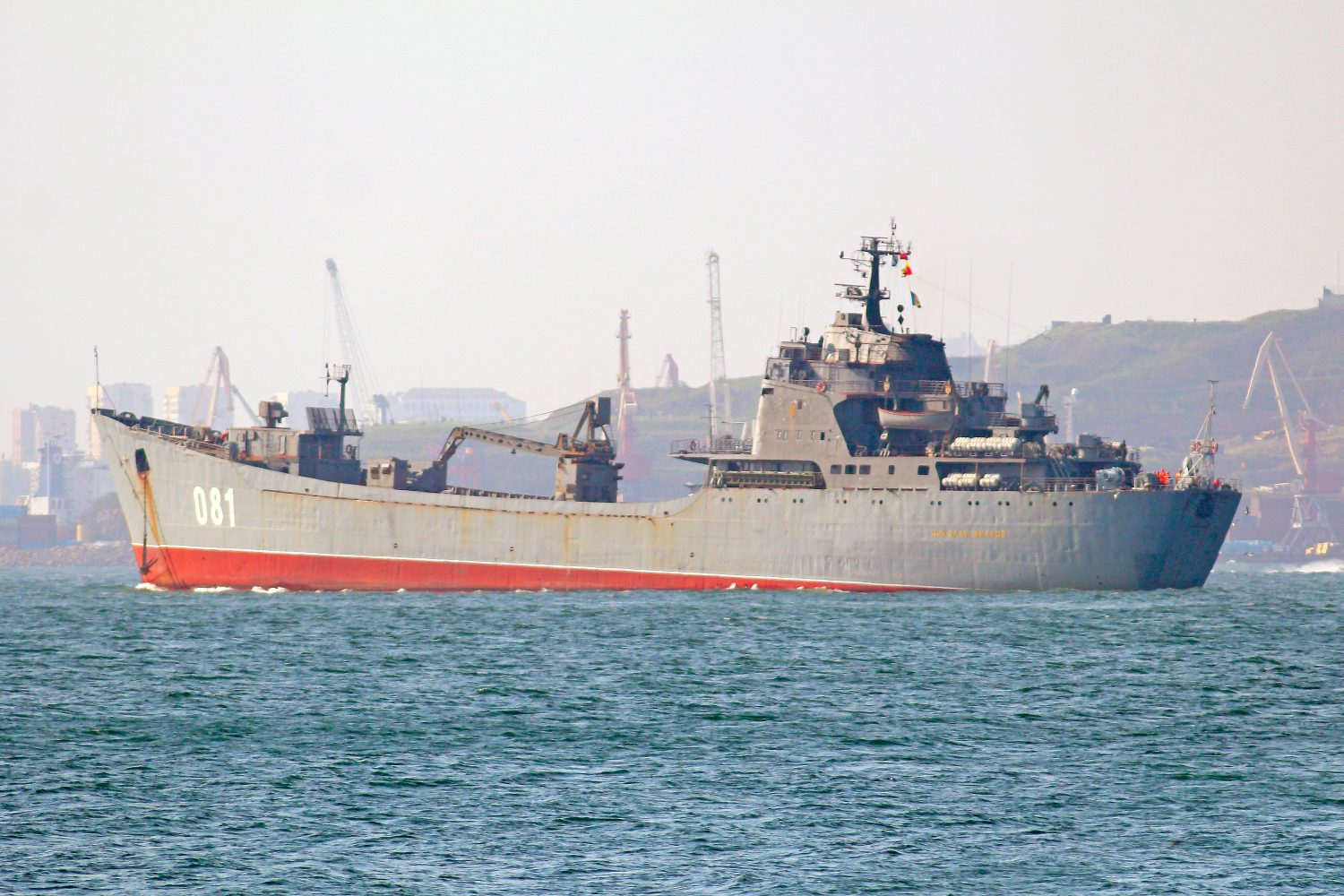

History

Russia
- Name: Nikolai Vilkov
- Namesake: Nikolai Vilkov
- Builder: Yantar Shipyard, Kaliningrad
- Yard number: 303
- Laid down: 3 September 1971
- Launched: 30 November 1973
- Commissioned: 30 July 1974
- Home port: Vladivostok
- Identification: Hull number: 500 (1974); 504 (1974); 357 (1974-1977); 388 (1977); 022 (1977); 053 (1977-1980); 075 (1980-1981); 078 (1981-1984); 066 (1984-1987); 070 (1987-1990); 068 (1990-1992); 089 (1992-1993); 081 (1993-present)
- Status: In service

General characteristics
- Class & type: Tapir-class landing ship
- Displacement: 3,400 tons standard; 4,360–4,700 tons full load
- Length: 112.8–113.1 m (370 ft 1 in – 371 ft 1 in)
- Beam: 15.3–15.6 m (50 ft 2 in – 51 ft 2 in)
- Draft: 4.5 m (14 ft 9 in)
- Installed power: 9,000 bhp (6,700 kW)
- Propulsion: 2 diesels, 2 shafts
- Speed: 16–18 knots (30–33 km/h)
- Capacity: 1,000 tons
- Troops: 300–425 troops and 20 tanks, or 40 AFVs, or 1,000 tons
- Crew: 55
- Armament: Missiles: 1 × 122 mm naval Grad bombardment rocket launcher in some, 3 × SA-N-5 SAM positions in some.; Guns: 1 dual 57 mm/70 cal DP, 2 dual 25 mm AA in some.; 2 × 7 55 mm MRG-1 Ogonyok multi-barrel rocket grenade launchers (RG-55 grenades)

Nikolai Vilkov (Russian: Николай Вилков) is a Tapir-class landing ship of the Russian Navy and part of the Pacific Fleet.

Named after petty officer first class Nikolai Vilkov, a posthumous Hero of the Soviet Union killed in action during the Second World War, the ship was built in Kaliningrad. She is classified as a BDK (Russian: БДК) for Russian: Большой десантный корабль, romanized: Bolshoy desantnyi korabl', lit. 'large landing ship'. She is one of the Tapir class designated Project 1171/IV by the Russian Navy, with the NATO reporting name Alligator.

== Construction and commissioning ==
Nikolai Vilkov was built by Yantar Shipyard in Kaliningrad, being laid down on 3 September 1971 and launched on 30 November 1973. She was commissioned into the Soviet Navy on 30 July 1974 as part of its Pacific Fleet. She was named in honour of petty officer first class Nikolai Vilkov, a posthumous Hero of the Soviet Union killed in action at the Battle of Shumshu during the Second World War. She was homeported in Vladivostok Naval Base, and with the dissolution of the Soviet Union in late December 1991, she went on to serve in the Russian Navy.

== Career ==
Nikolai Vilkov was several times deployed with fleet units on long-distance voyages, carrying out seven missions to the Indian Ocean and visiting Ethiopia, the Persian Gulf, Vietnam, and Okinawa. She was at Aden during the South Yemen civil war, when she was fired upon, necessitating the deployment of tanks. She was again attacked, this time by pirates, while sailing in the South China Sea at night, having been mistaken for a civilian cargo ship. She returned fire, driving the pirates off. She took part in joint US-UK-French naval exercises in the Persian Gulf in January 1994, and in autumn that year delivered relief supplies to the South Kuril Islands after the 1994 Kuril Islands earthquake. In 2014, she was one of the ships at the Navy Day naval parade in Vladivostok.

In August 2018, she and the Ropucha-class landing ship Peresvet carried out exercises in Desantnaya Bay, loading and unloading BMP-2 infantry fighting vehicles, 2S1 Gvozdika self-propelled artillery units, and a marine battalion. The landing ships were part of exercises involving six warships and 300 marines. She carried out further exercises in October that year with Peresvet and Admiral Nevelskoy. In March 2019, she carried out gunnery and landing exercises. Further exercises were held in March 2020, with the Ropucha-class landing ship Oslyabya, and then again in June with Oslyabya, Admiral Nevelskoy, Peresvet in Providence Bay, supported by the hydrographic ship Sever and the ocean-going tug MB-61.

In mid-2020, Nikolai Vilkov deployed on a five-month training voyage from Vladivostok with three other large landing ships, Admiral Nevelskoy, Oslyabya, and Peresvet. The ships travelled more than 23 thousand nautical miles over 158 days, carrying out a number of exercises, before returning to Vladivostok on 12 November 2020. In May 2024 she deployed with Oslyabya and Peresvet in Desantnaya Bay near Vladivostok to practice loading and unloading BTR-82A armoured personnel carriers and BMP-3 infantry fighting vehicles. Some 300 servicemen and 30 vehicles were involved. She carried out more gunnery exercises with Admiral Nevelskoy in November 2021, and with Admiral Nevelskoy and Oslyabya in March 2022. There were further exercises in January and March 2023, and in August she led a detachment of vessels to Zarubino, Primorsky Krai to evacuate holidaymakers from Khasansky District who had been cut off by heavy rains. Together with the hydrographic vessel GS-84, the fire boat PZhK-1514, the diving support boat VM-20 and the harbour tug RB-404, 1,074 people and 34 cars were evacuated from the port of Zarubino and transported to Vladivostok. Nikolai Vilkov returned to exercises throughout the early part of 2024, and again in November that year. In November 2026, she was tracked by Japanese vessels as she accompanied a Kilo-class submarine and Russian navy tugboat north of the island of Hokkaido.
