= Russian landing ship Peresvet =

Russian Navy landing ship

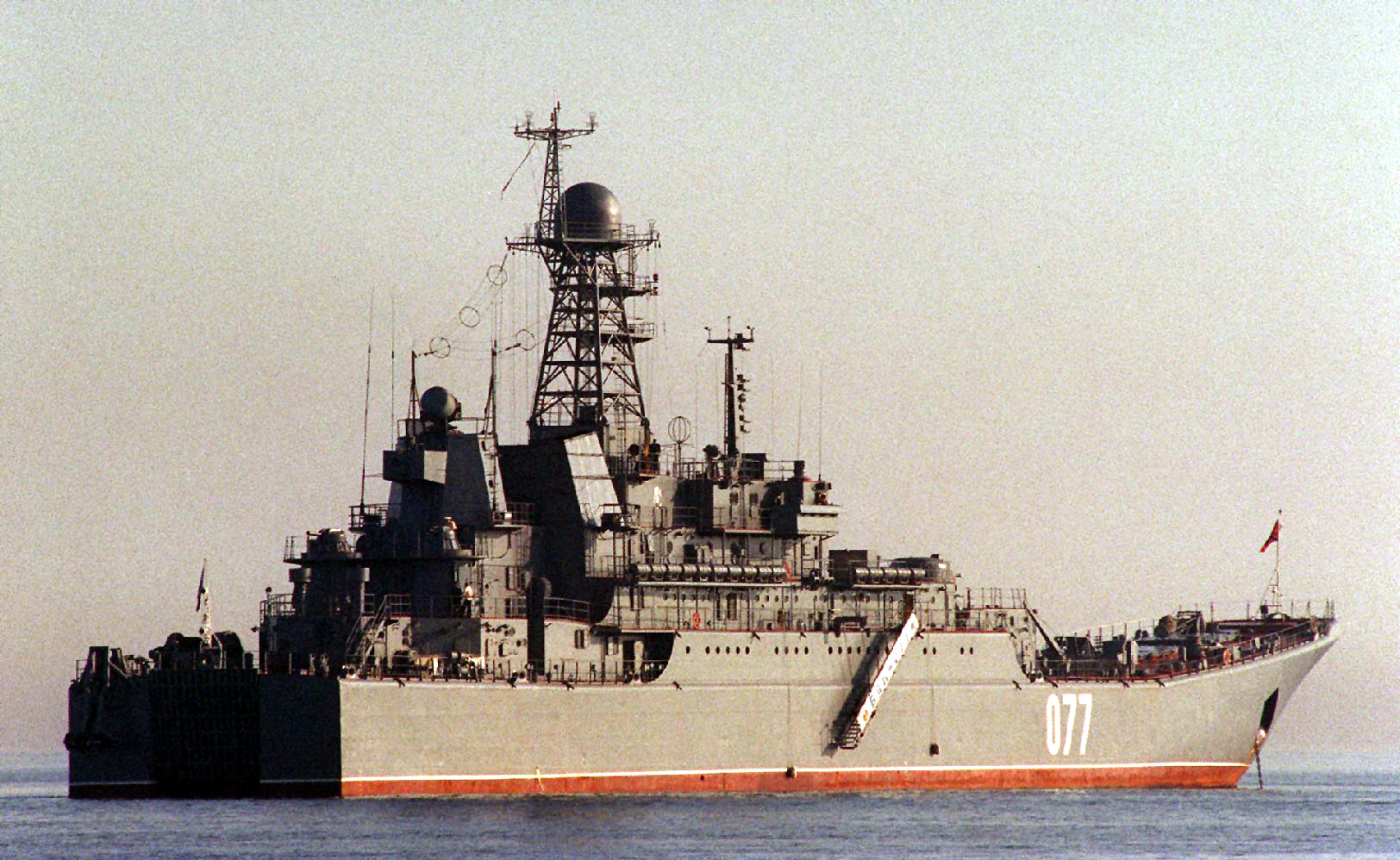

History

Russia
- Name: BDK-11 (1991-2006); Peresvet (2006-present)
- Namesake: Alexander Peresvet
- Builder: Stocznia Północna, Gdańsk, Poland
- Commissioned: 10 April 1991
- Home port: Fokino, Primorsky Krai
- Identification: Hull number: 131 (1991-1992); 100 (1992); 077 (1992-present)
- Status: In service

General characteristics
- Class & type: Ropucha-class landing ship
- Displacement: 3,450 t (3,396 long tons) standard; 4,080 t (4,016 long tons) full load
- Length: 112.5 m (369 ft 1 in)
- Beam: 15.01 m (49 ft 3 in)
- Draught: 4.26 m (14 ft 0 in)
- Ramps: Over bows and at stern
- Installed power: 3 × 750 kW (1,006 hp) diesel generators
- Propulsion: 2 × 9,600 hp (7,159 kW) Zgoda-Sulzer 16ZVB40/48 diesel engines
- Speed: 18 knots (33 km/h; 21 mph)
- Range: 6,000 nmi (11,000 km; 6,900 mi) at 12 knots (22 km/h; 14 mph); 3,500 nmi (6,500 km; 4,000 mi) at 16 knots (30 km/h; 18 mph)
- Endurance: 30 days
- Capacity: 10 × main battle tanks and 340 troops or 12 × BTR APC and 340 troops or 3 × main battle tanks, 3 × 2S9 Nona-S SPG, 5 × MT-LB APC, 4 trucks and 313 troops or 500 tons of cargo
- Complement: 98
- Armament: 2 × AK-725 twin 57 mm (2.2 in) DP guns; 4 × 8 Strela 2 SAM launchers; 2 × 22 A-215 Grad-M rocket launchers

Peresvet (Russian: Пересвет) is a Ropucha-class landing ship of the Russian Navy and part of the Pacific Fleet.

Named after the semi-legendary hero of the Battle of Kulikovo Alexander Peresvet, the ship was built in Poland. She was named BDK-11 (Russian: БДК-11) for Russian: Большой десантный корабль, romanized: Bolshoy desantnyi korabl', lit. 'large landing ship', from her construction until being renamed Peresvet in 2006. She is one of the subtype of the Ropucha-class landing ships, designated Project 775/III or Project 775M by the Russian Navy.

== Construction and commissioning ==
Peresvet was built as BDK-11 by Stocznia Północna, part of Gdańsk Shipyard, in Gdańsk, in what was then the Polish People's Republic. She was commissioned into the Soviet Navy on 10 April 1991 as part of its Pacific Fleet. She was homeported in Fokino, Primorsky Krai, and with the dissolution of the Soviet Union in late December 1991, she went on to serve in the Russian Navy.

== Career ==
In service since 1991 as BDK-11, she visited Kure, Japan in 2004. She carried out several annual voyages to places connected with past exploits of Soviet and Russian forces in the Pacific, in 2005, 2006, and 2007. In August 2005, she travelled to Qingdao to take part in joint Russian-Chinese exercises, and was renamed Peresvet on 24 January 2006. Later that year she visited US facilities at Agana in the Mariana Islands and conducted joint Russian-American exercises simulating natural disaster responses. She had returned to home waters by 6 June that year, when she took departed on the annual "Memory Voyage" cruise from Vladivostok to Sakhalin. The two-week long voyage visited Timofeyevka, Olga, Korsakov, Yuzhno-Sakhalinsk, Magadan, Okhotsk, and Kholmsk. In Kholmsk the crew was joined by that of a small anti-submarine vessel and Archbishop Mark of the Diocese of Khabarovsk and Amur for church services and the laying of wreaths at monuments on Sakhalin Island. She rendered honours at the site of the lost submarine S-117 in Preobrazhenie Bay, before stopping at Preobrazhenie and Fokino, returning to Vladivostok on 27 June. In summer 2010, she was part of the Vostok 2010 exercise with more than three dozen warships and support vessels, including ships from the Northern and Black Sea Fleets, and marines from the Baltic Fleet. In 2012, Peresvet was present at the Navy Day naval parade in Vladivostok.

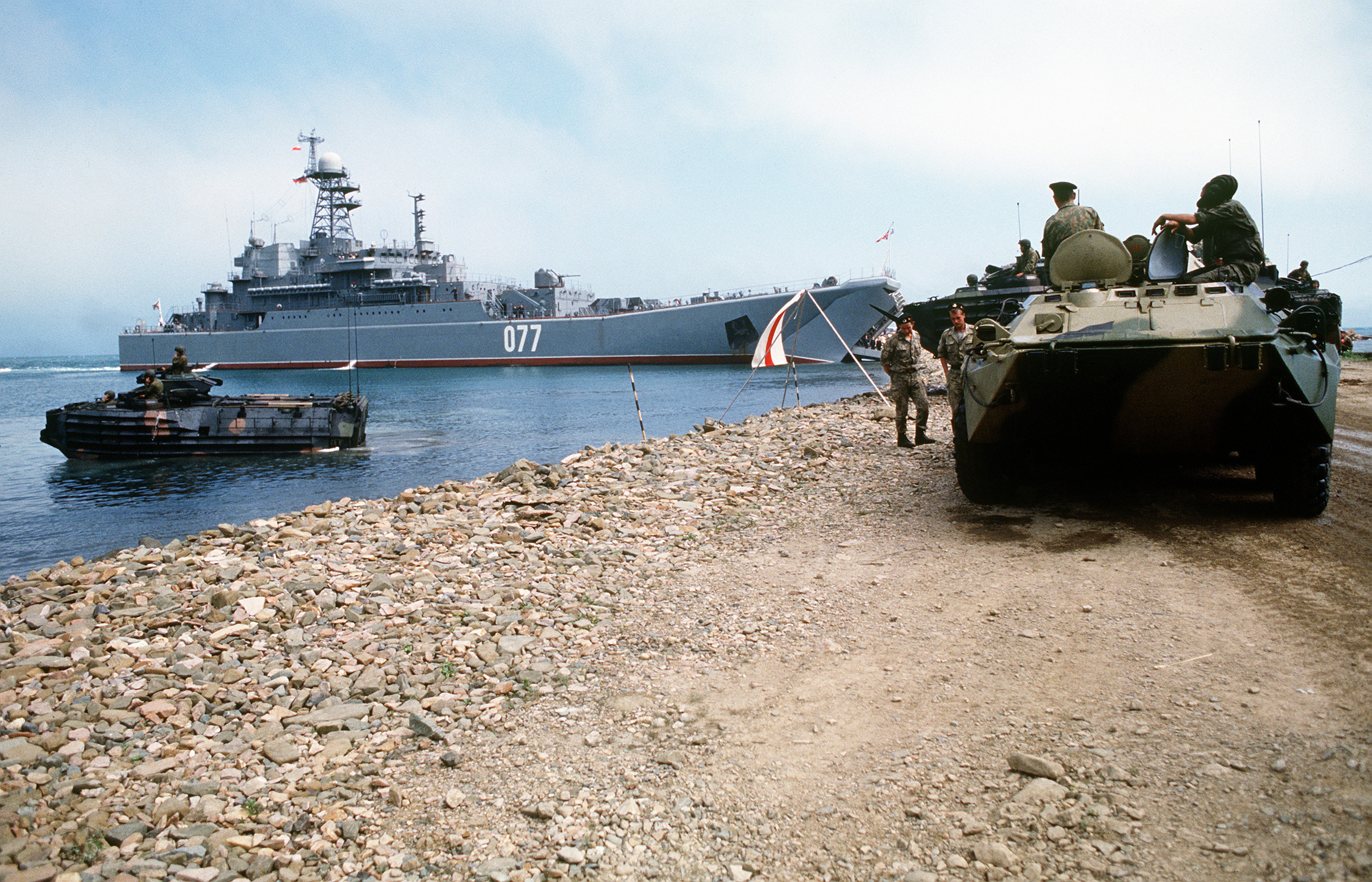
Joint US-Russia exercises in 1994. BTR-80 armoured personnel carriers landing from BDK-11.

She left her Pacific homepart on 19 March 2013, with the Pacific Fleet destroyer Admiral Panteleyev, her sister ships Oslyabya and Admiral Nevelskoy, the tanker Pechenga, and the ocean-going tug Fotiy Krylov. Admiral Nevelskoy and Peresvet sailed on to the Black Sea port of Novorossiysk, where they arrived on 24 May 2013. She then operated from September 2013 as part of the navy's permanent task force in the Mediterranean , returning to Vladivostok on 25 December. In 2014, Peresvet took part in joint Russian-Indian exercises in the Pacific Ocean. In September 2017, she transported the second joint expedition of the Ministry of Defence and the Russian Geographical Society from Matua. That November, she and her sister ship Admiral Nevelskoy carried out landing exercises with coastal troop detachments. In February 2018, Peresvet carried out gunnery exercises in Peter the Great Bay, and took part in the 2019 Navy Day naval parade in Vladivostok on 29 July that year.

In mid-2020, Peresvet deployed on a five-month training voyage from Vladivostok with three other large landing ships, Admiral Nevelskoy, Oslyabya, and Nikolai Vilkov. The ships travelled more than 23 thousand nautical miles over 158 days, carrying out a number of exercises, before returning to Vladivostok on 12 November 2020. On 2 October 2023, Peresvet carried out a practice amphibious assault in Malaya Lagernaya Bay, Kamchatka. In May 2024 she deployed with Oslyabya and Nikolai Vilkov in Desantnaya Bay near Vladivostok to practice loading and unloading BTR-82A armoured personnel carriers and BMP-3 infantry fighting vehicles. Some 300 servicemen and 30 vehicles were involved. In August 2024, Peresvet was in port in Egvekinot, Chukotka Autonomous Okrug while on exercises in Kresta Bay. During her time there she was visited by 288 local people, while the ship's crew brought a piano from Vladivostok as a gift for the town.
