= Russian submarine Kashalot =

Akula-class submarine of the Russian Navy

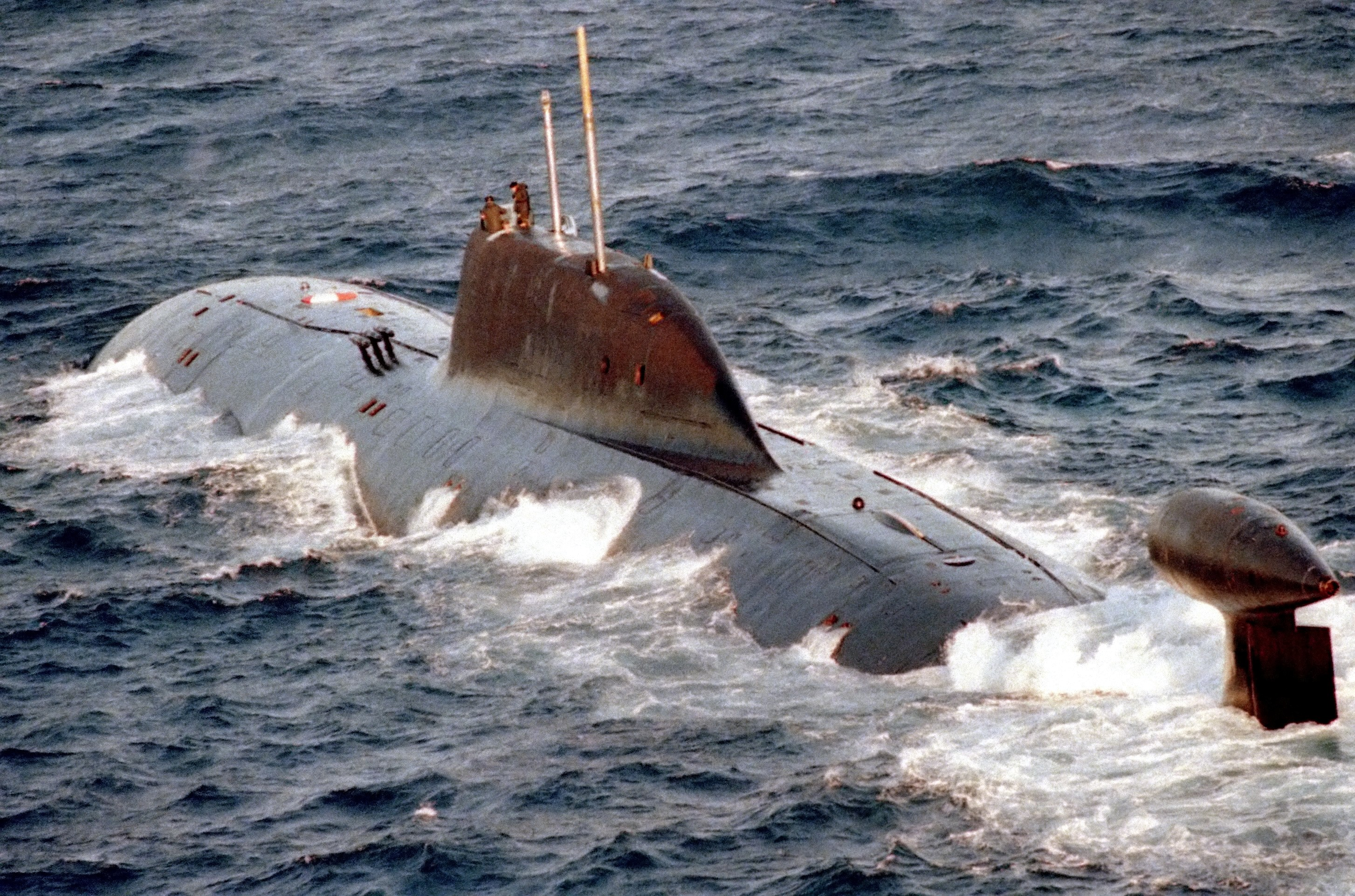
- Kashalot

History

Russia
- Name: K-322
- Builder: Amur Shipyard, Komsomolsk-on-Amur
- Yard number: 513
- Laid down: 5 September 1986
- Launched: 18 July 1987
- Commissioned: 30 December 1988
- Renamed: Kashalot; (Кашалот)
- Namesake: Kashalot
- Decommissioned: 9 October 2019
- Identification: Pennant number: 985
- Status: Decommissioned

General characteristics
- Class & type: Akula-class submarine
- Displacement: 8,010–14,470 long tons (8,140–14,700 t) surfaced; 12,570 long tons (12,770 t) submerged
- Length: 110.3 m (361 ft 11 in) maximum
- Beam: 13.6 m (44 ft 7 in)
- Draught: 9.7 m (31 ft 10 in)
- Propulsion: one 190 MW OK-650B/OK-650M pressurized water nuclear reactor (HEU <= 45%); 1 OK-7 steam turbine 43,000 hp (32 MW); 2 OK-2 Turbogenerators producing 2 MW; 1 seven-bladed propeller; 2 OK-300 retractable electric propulsors for low-speed and quiet maneuvering at 5 knots (9.3 km/h; 5.8 mph)
- Speed: 10 knots (19 km/h; 12 mph) surfaced; 28–35 knots (52–65 km/h; 32–40 mph) submerged
- Endurance: 100 days
- Test depth: 480 m (1,570 ft)
- Complement: 73
- Sensors & processing systems: MGK-500 or 540 active/passive suite; Flank arrays; Pelamida towed array sonar; MG-70 mine detection sonar
- Electronic warfare & decoys: Bukhta ESM/ECM; MG-74 Korund noise simulation decoys (fired from external tubes); MT-70 Sonar intercept receiver; Nikhrom-M IFF
- Armament: 4 × 533 mm torpedo tubes (28 torpedoes) and 4 × 650 mm torpedo tubes (12 torpedoes).; 1–3 × Igla-M surface-to-air missile launcher fired from sail (surface use only); Granat cruise missiles, now Kalibr
- Notes: Chiblis Surface Search radar; Medvyeditsa-945 Navigation system; Molniya-M Satellite communications; MGK-80 Underwater communications; Tsunami, Kiparis, Anis, Sintez and Kora Communications antennas; Paravan Towed VLF Antenna; Vspletsk Combat direction system

K-322 Kashalot was an Akula-class submarine in the Russian Navy.

== Design ==
Project 971 has a double-hull design. The robust body is made of high-quality alloy steel with σт = 1 GPa (10,000 kgf / cm^{2}). To simplify the installation of equipment, the boat was designed using zonal blocks, which made it possible to transfer a significant amount of work from the cramped conditions of the sub's compartments directly to the workshop. After completion of the installation, the zonal unit is “rolled” into the hull of the boat and connected to the main cables and pipelines of the ship's systems. A two-stage damping system is used: all mechanisms are placed on damped foundations, in addition, each zone unit is isolated from the body by rubber-cord pneumatic shock absorbers. In addition to reducing the overall noise level of nuclear submarines, such a scheme can reduce the impact of underwater explosions on equipment and crew. The boat has a developed vertical tail unit with a streamlined boule, in which the towed antenna is located. Also on the submarine are two reclining thrusters and retractable bow horizontal rudders with flaps. A feature of the project is the smoothly mated connection of the tail unit to the hull. This is done to reduce noise-generating hydrodynamic eddies.

Power supply is carried out by a nuclear power plant. The lead boat, K-284 Akula, is equipped with an OK-650M.01 pressurized water-cooled nuclear reactor. On later orders, the AEU has minor improvements. Some sources report that subsequent boats are equipped with OK-9VM reactors. The thermal power of the reactor is 190 MW, the shaft power is 50,000 liters. with. Two auxiliary electric motors in the hinged outboard columns have a capacity of 410 hp. with., there is one diesel generator ASDG-1000.

== Construction and career ==
The submarine was laid down on 5 September 1986 at Amur Shipyard, Komsomolsk-on-Amur. Launched on 18 July 1987 and commissioned on 30 December 1988.

The boat was adopted into the Navy on 25 January 1989. On 1 March, he was included in the Red Banner Pacific Fleet. He became a part of the 45th Submarine Division of the second submarine KTOF based in Kamchatka, in the Krasheninnikov Bay (Rybachy settlement).

In the summer of 1990, she completed the tasks of combat service. The duration of tracking foreign submarines in the campaign was more than 14 days (354 hours). This was the best result at that time, tracking time for the foreign submarine exceeded the best achievements of the submarines of the USSR Navy. On 13 April 1993, he received the name Kashalot.

In March 1998, the 2nd FPL of the Pacific Fleet was transferred to the 10th DPL with the former base.

In the TSD Zeya in September 2002, he was transported to the ZSO Vostok, the reactor core was unloaded, before being put into medium repair.

From 2013 to 2014, she was on the territory of the Federal State Unitary Enterprise Amur Shipyard in Komsomolsk-on-Amur, awaiting repairs.

In January 2015, the Indian Navy's leadership submitted an offer to lease the Kashalot nuclear submarine after being repaired.

On 10 October 2019, a decision was made on the inexpediency and technical impossibility of further repairs and on the disposal of the submarine in May 2020. Disposal work began in 2020 on the basis of the Amur shipyard. Instead of K-322, India plans to lease K-331 Magadan.
