= Bechevinka =

Former Soviet/Russian naval base

Coordinates: 53°16′21″N 159°47′04″E

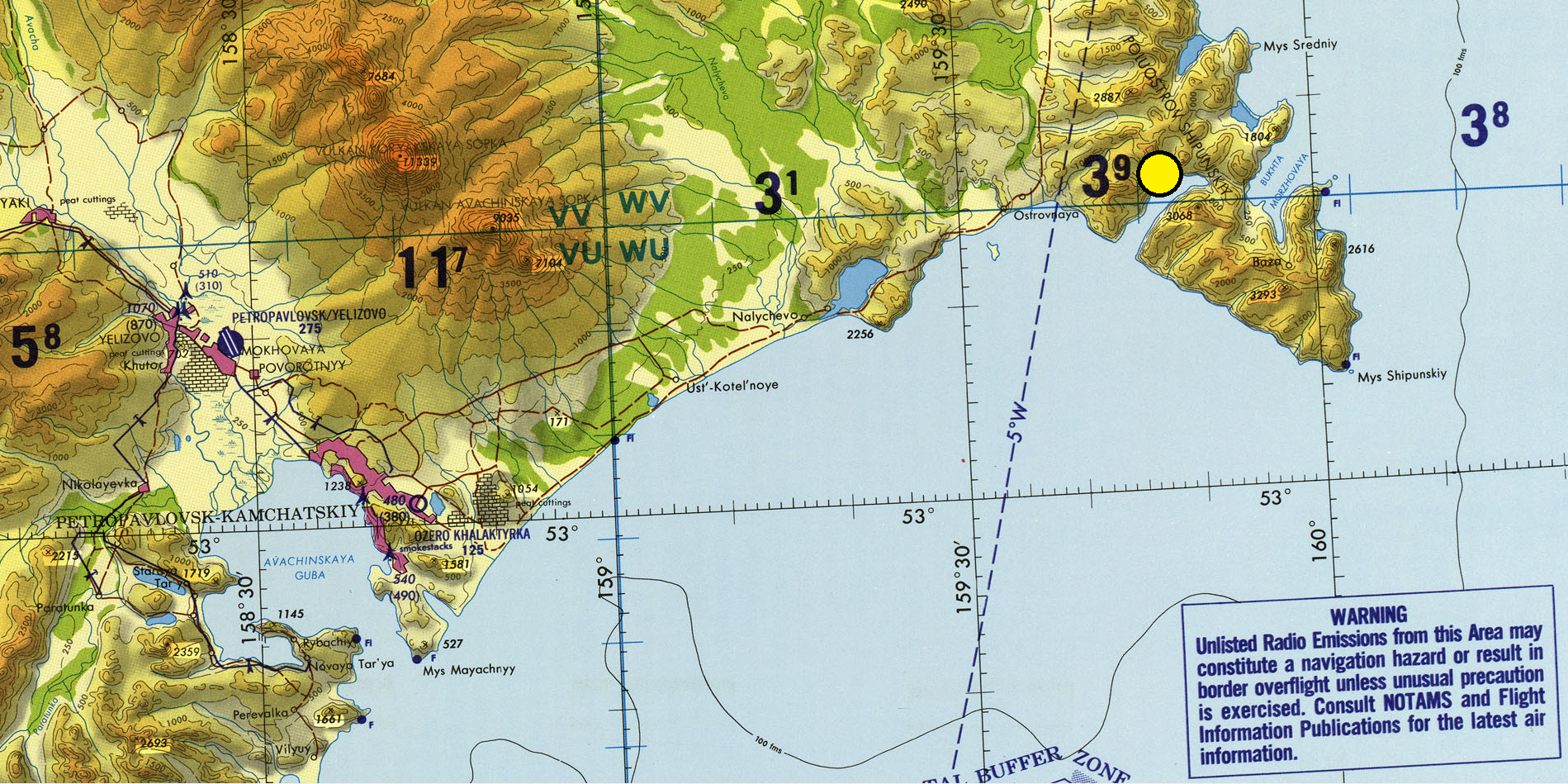
Position of Bechevinka (yellow circle) marked on a 1984 American map showing Petropavlovsk-Kamchatka

Bechevinka (Russian: Бечевинка) was a naval base of the Soviet and Russian Navies in a remote portion of Kamchatka Peninsula, Russia. It was established in the 1960s for use by submarines of the Soviet Pacific Fleet. The site was abandoned in 1996 and is currently a tourist destination as a ghost town. In May 2020 Novatek proposed to develop the site into a transhipment hub for liquified natural gas.

== Naval base ==
Bechevinka is situated on an inlet of the Shipunsky peninsula in Kamchatka. The local area is known as the "land of fire and ice" due to the presence of volcanoes and glaciers. The base was constructed in the 1960s for submarines of the Soviet Pacific Fleet. It was codenamed Petropavlovsk-Kamchatsky-54, after the nearest town and the last two digits of the base's post code. The site was remote and in the winter could only be reached by boat, helicopter and sledge. It was serviced by a weekly supply ship from Petropavlovsk-Kamchatsky.

The site had eight three- to five-storey accommodation blocks, a headquarters building, a school, supermarket, post office, leisure centre (with space for orchestral performances), boilerhouse, stores warehouses and a refuelling facility. The site suffered a severe fire in 1987. The naval base was abandoned in 1996 and the submarines transferred to a nearby facility.

== Abandonment and future use ==
After its abandonment the site became a ghost town. One of the former supply ships remains as a beached and rusted wreck. Despite its remoteness it had become a tourist destination. Bechevinka was featured in Robert Grenville's 2019 book Abandoned Cold War Places.

In May 2020 the former naval base was selected as a site for a new liquified natural gas transhipment hub for Novatek. It is intended to handle 20,000,000 long tons (20,000,000 t) of product per year, largely for the Asian export market. The work is forecast to cost $1.5 billion.
