= Viktor Liina =

Russian naval officer (born 1968)

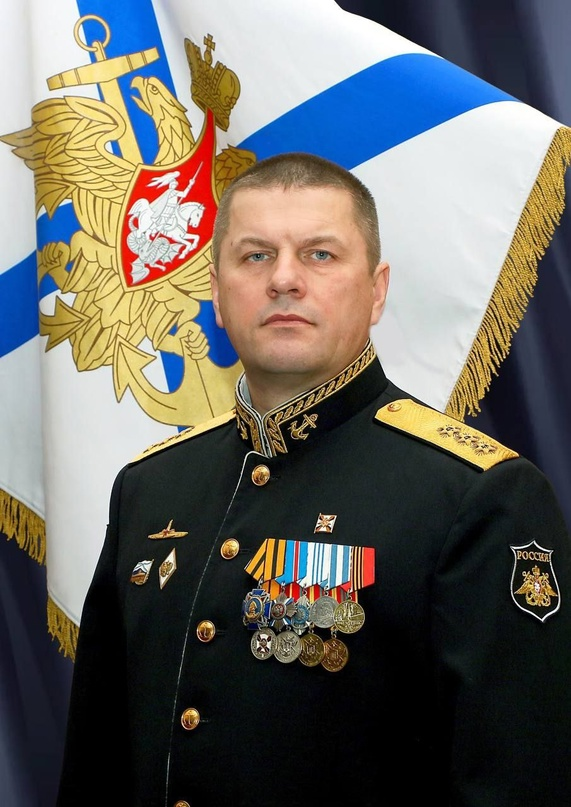
- Born: 19 July 1968 (age 58); Pechory, Pskov Oblast, Russian SFSR, Soviet Union
- Education: Higher Naval School of Submarine Navigation; Kuznetsov Naval Academy; General Staff Military Academy
- Military career
- Allegiance: USSR; Russia
- Branch: Soviet Navy; Russian Navy
- Service years: 1985–present
- Rank: Admiral
- Commands: White Sea Naval Base; Northeastern Group of Troops and Forces; Baltic Fleet
- Awards: Order of Nakhimov; Order of Military Merit; Order of Naval Merit; Medal of Zhukov

Viktor Nikolayevich Liina (Russian: Виктор Николаевич Лиина; born 19 July 1968) is an officer of the Russian Navy. He holds the rank of admiral and has served as the commander of the Pacific Fleet since 2023. Previously, he served as the commander of the Baltic Fleet from 2021 to 2023.

== Career ==
Liina was born on 19 June 1968 in Pechory, Pskov Oblast, then part of the Russian Soviet Federative Socialist Republic, in the Soviet Union. His surname is Estonian, as his father Liina Kolla (Russian: Nikolai Liina) was Seto and fluently spoke the Seto dialect. Pechory (Petseri) was part of Estonia between 1919–1944.

He studied at the Higher Naval School of Submarine Navigation in Leningrad, graduating in 1990 and being assigned to serve on the submarines of the Northern Fleet. Beginning as an engineer in the electronic navigation department of a cruiser submarine, he rose through the ranks to eventually command a nuclear submarine. In 1996 he graduated from the Higher Special Officer Classes of the Navy. From 1999 to 2004 he was commander of the 74th "Segezha" crew of the Northern Fleet's 11th Submarine Division.

Liina graduated from the Kuznetsov Naval Academy in 2006, and was appointed in succession as deputy commander and chief of staff, and then commander of a submarine division, deputy commander of the submarine forces of the Northern Fleet, and then commander of the White Sea Naval Base from 2010 to 2012. On 9 August 2012 Liina was promoted to the rank of kontr-admiral. This was followed with a posting as commander of Northeastern Group of Troops and Forces in December 2012.

In 2014 Liina enrolled in the Military Academy of the General Staff of the Armed Forces of Russia, and on graduating in 2016, was appointed First Deputy Commander of the Black Sea Fleet in May that year. On 12 December 2018 Liina was promoted to the rank of vice-admiral and on 1 August 2019 he took up the role of Deputy Chief of the General Staff of the Armed Forces of the Russian Federation. In this capacity in July 2020 he led the General Staff's control group on an inspection of the Black Sea Fleet before the upcoming strategic command and staff exercises "Caucasus 2020". On 18 May 2020 he presented diplomas to graduates of the NBC Protection Military Academy.

On 5 October 2021 Liina was appointed Commander of the Baltic Fleet. He was promoted to the rank of admiral on 7 December 2022.

Over his career Liina has received the Orders of Nakhimov, Military Merit and Naval Merit, as well as various medals. On 22 April 2023 he was appointed commander of the Pacific Fleet, replacing Admiral Sergei Avakyants.
