= Russian submarine Magadan =

Akula-class submarine of the Russian Navy

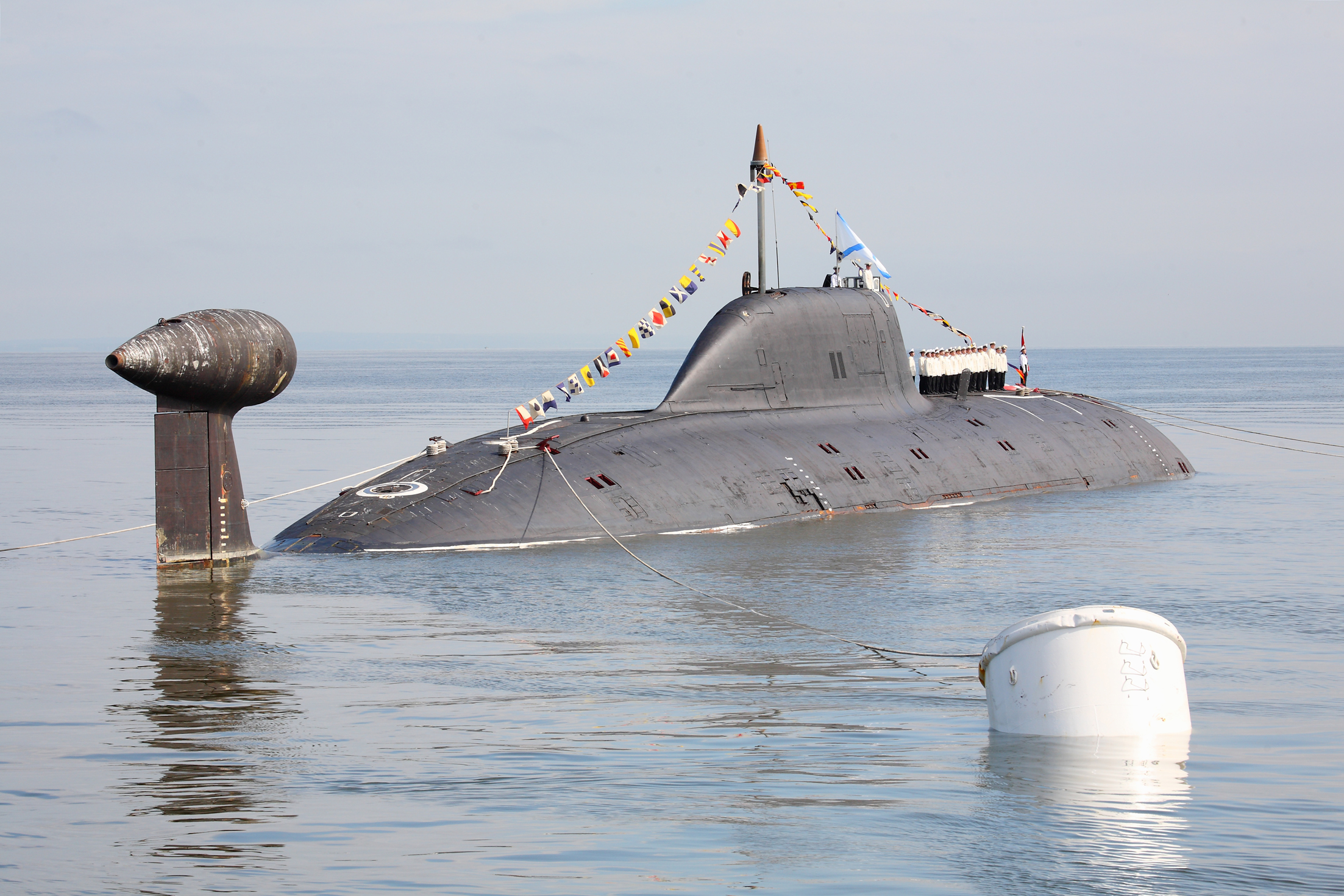
- Magadan

History

Russia
- Name: K-331
- Builder: Amur Shipyard, Komsomolsk-on-Amur
- Yard number: 515
- Laid down: 28 December 1989
- Launched: 23 June 1990
- Commissioned: 23 December 1990
- Renamed: Magadan; (Магадан)
- Namesake: Magadan
- Identification: Pennant number: 997
- Status: Active
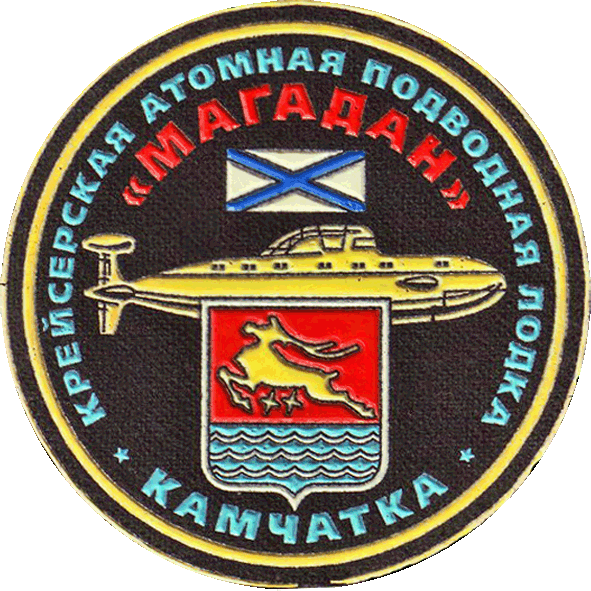
- Badge

General characteristics
- Class & type: Akula-class submarine
- Displacement: 8,010–14,470 long tons (8,140–14,700 t) surfaced; 12,570 long tons (12,770 t) submerged
- Length: 110.3 m (361 ft 11 in) maximum
- Beam: 13.6 m (44 ft 7 in)
- Draught: 9.7 m (31 ft 10 in)
- Propulsion: one 190 MW OK-650B/OK-650M pressurized water nuclear reactor (HEU <= 45%); 1 OK-7 steam turbine 43,000 hp (32 MW); 2 OK-2 Turbogenerators producing 2 MW; 1 seven-bladed propeller; 2 OK-300 retractable electric propulsors for low-speed and quiet maneuvering at 5 knots (9.3 km/h; 5.8 mph)
- Speed: 10 knots (19 km/h; 12 mph) surfaced; 28–35 knots (52–65 km/h; 32–40 mph) submerged
- Endurance: 100 days
- Test depth: 480 m (1,570 ft)
- Complement: 73
- Sensors & processing systems: MGK-500 or 540 active/passive suite; Flank arrays; Pelamida towed array sonar; MG-70 mine detection sonar
- Electronic warfare & decoys: Bukhta ESM/ECM; MG-74 Korund noise simulation decoys (fired from external tubes); MT-70 Sonar intercept receiver; Nikhrom-M IFF
- Armament: 4 × 533 mm torpedo tubes (28 torpedoes) and 4 × 650 mm torpedo tubes (12 torpedoes).; 1–3 × Igla-M surface-to-air missile launcher fired from sail (surface use only); Granat cruise missiles, now Kalibr
- Notes: Chiblis Surface Search radar; Medvyeditsa-945 Navigation system; Molniya-M Satellite communications; MGK-80 Underwater communications; Tsunami, Kiparis, Anis, Sintez and Kora Communications antennas; Paravan Towed VLF Antenna; Vspletsk Combat direction system

K-331 Magadan is an Akula-class submarine in the Russian Navy.

== Design ==
Project 971 has a double-hull design. The robust body is made of high-quality alloy steel with σт = 1 GPa (10,000 kgf / cm^{2}). To simplify the installation of equipment, the boat was designed using zonal blocks, which made it possible to transfer a significant amount of work from the cramped conditions of the sub's compartments directly to the workshop. After completion of the installation, the zonal unit is “rolled” into the hull of the boat and connected to the main cables and pipelines of the ship's systems. A two-stage damping system is used: all mechanisms are placed on damped foundations, in addition, each zone unit is isolated from the body by rubber-cord pneumatic shock absorbers. In addition to reducing the overall noise level of nuclear submarines, such a scheme can reduce the impact of underwater explosions on equipment and crew. The boat has a developed vertical tail unit with a streamlined boule, in which the towed antenna is located. Also on the submarine are two reclining thrusters and retractable bow horizontal rudders with flaps. A feature of the project is the smoothly mated connection of the tail unit to the hull. This is done to reduce noise-generating hydrodynamic eddies.

Power supply is carried out by a nuclear power plant. The lead boat, K-284 Akula, is equipped with an OK-650M.01 pressurized water-cooled nuclear reactor. On later orders, the AEU has minor improvements. Some sources report that subsequent boats are equipped with OK-9VM reactors. The thermal power of the reactor is 190 MW, the shaft power is 50,000 liters. with. Two auxiliary electric motors in the hinged outboard columns have a capacity of 410 hp. with., there is one diesel generator ASDG-1000.

== Construction and career ==
The submarine was laid down on 28 December 1989 at Amur Shipyard, Komsomolsk-on-Amur. Launched on 23 June 1990 and commissioned on 23 December 1990.

On 14 March 1991, The submarine was inducted into the 45th Submarine Division of the Second Submarine Flotilla of the Pacific Fleet based in Krasheninnikov Bay. The submarine arrived for permanent deployment in Krasheninnikov Bay on 24 September 1991.From 8 September to 22 November 1992, she completed the tasks of the first combat service in the Sea of Okhotsk.

In December 1992, following the results of combat service, she won the prize of the Navy General Committee for the search and tracking of a foreign submarine and was declared the best in the Navy.On 13 April 1993, the submarine was renamed as Narval.

From 21 June to 21 August 1993, she performed his second patrol, off the coast of the United States in the Pacific Ocean.On 8 October 1996, she began her third patrol. A malfunction occurred during service, thus the boat returned to his base in Krasheninnikov Bay.From October to November 1997, he performed combat service and training with the crew of the K-295 Samara.

In 1998, Narval was transferred to the 10th Submarine Division of the 2nd Submarine Flotilla of the Pacific Fleet with the former base and on 24 January 2001, by order of the commander of the Pacific Fleet, she was renamed Magadan.

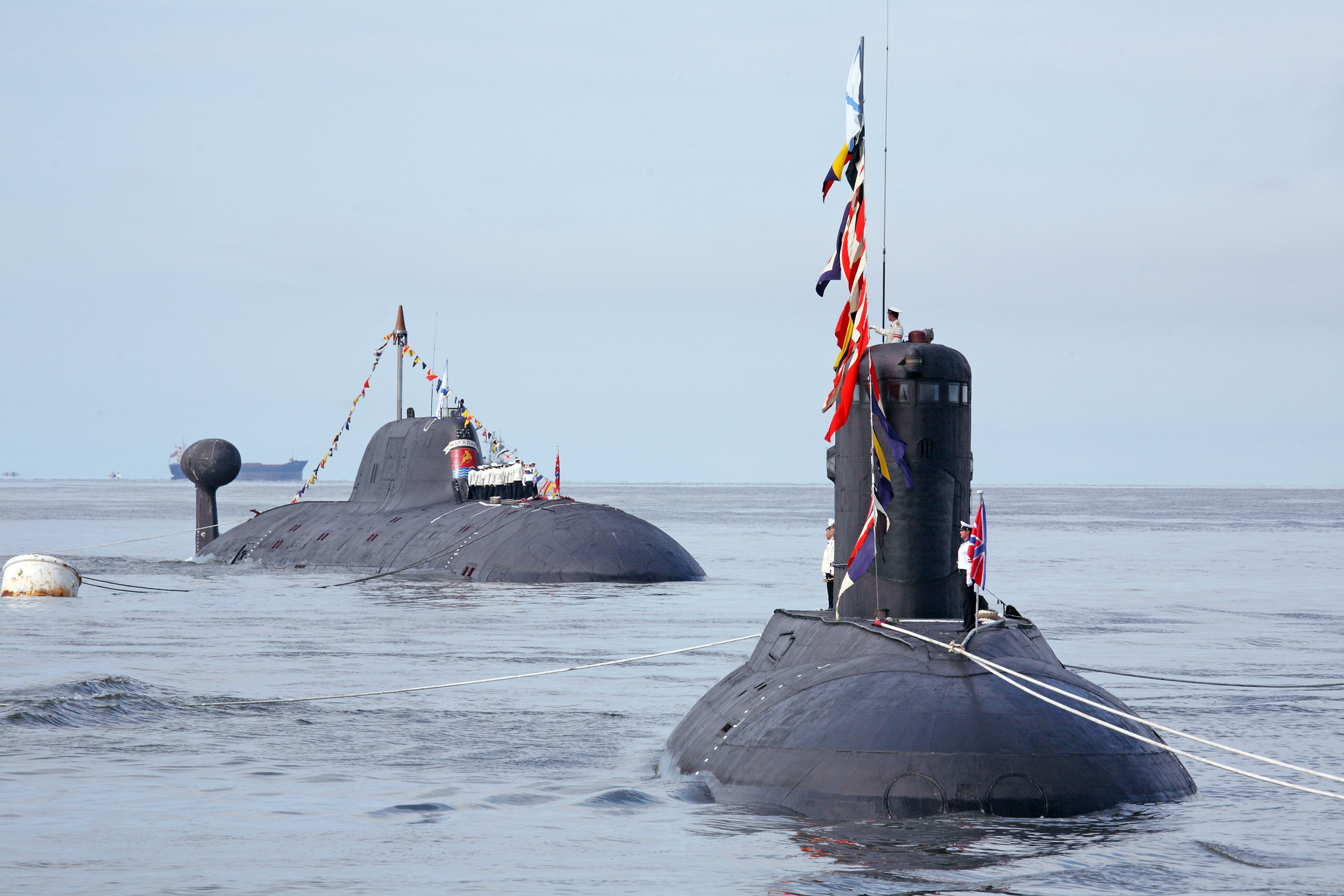
Magadan and Mogocha on 26 July 2009

On 3 October 2003, she represented the Russian Navy during a visit by an American military delegation.From 2007 to 2008, the boat was repaired and she took part in the Pacific Fleet's Naval Parade in the Amur Bay in July 2009.

The K-331 Magadan was in Bolshoy Kamen on 27 June 2015.As of 28 June 2015, it was located on the territory of the Zvezda Far Eastern Factory in Bolshoy Kamen, awaiting a refit. As of 24 August 2017, the repair and modernization of the submarine is nearing completion. On 11 August, it became known that the name Magadan will be given to the projected diesel-electric submarine of Project 636.3 Varshavyanka.

On 10 October 2019, a decision was made instead of K-322, India plans to lease K-331 Magadan. The transfer, after repair and modernization, to the lease of the Indian Navy was scheduled for 2022, though this did not take place. The transfer of a Russian SSN to India was subsequently delayed to at least 2028 and it may, or may not, involve Magadan.
