= Russian landing ship Admiral Nevelskoy =

Russian Navy landing ship

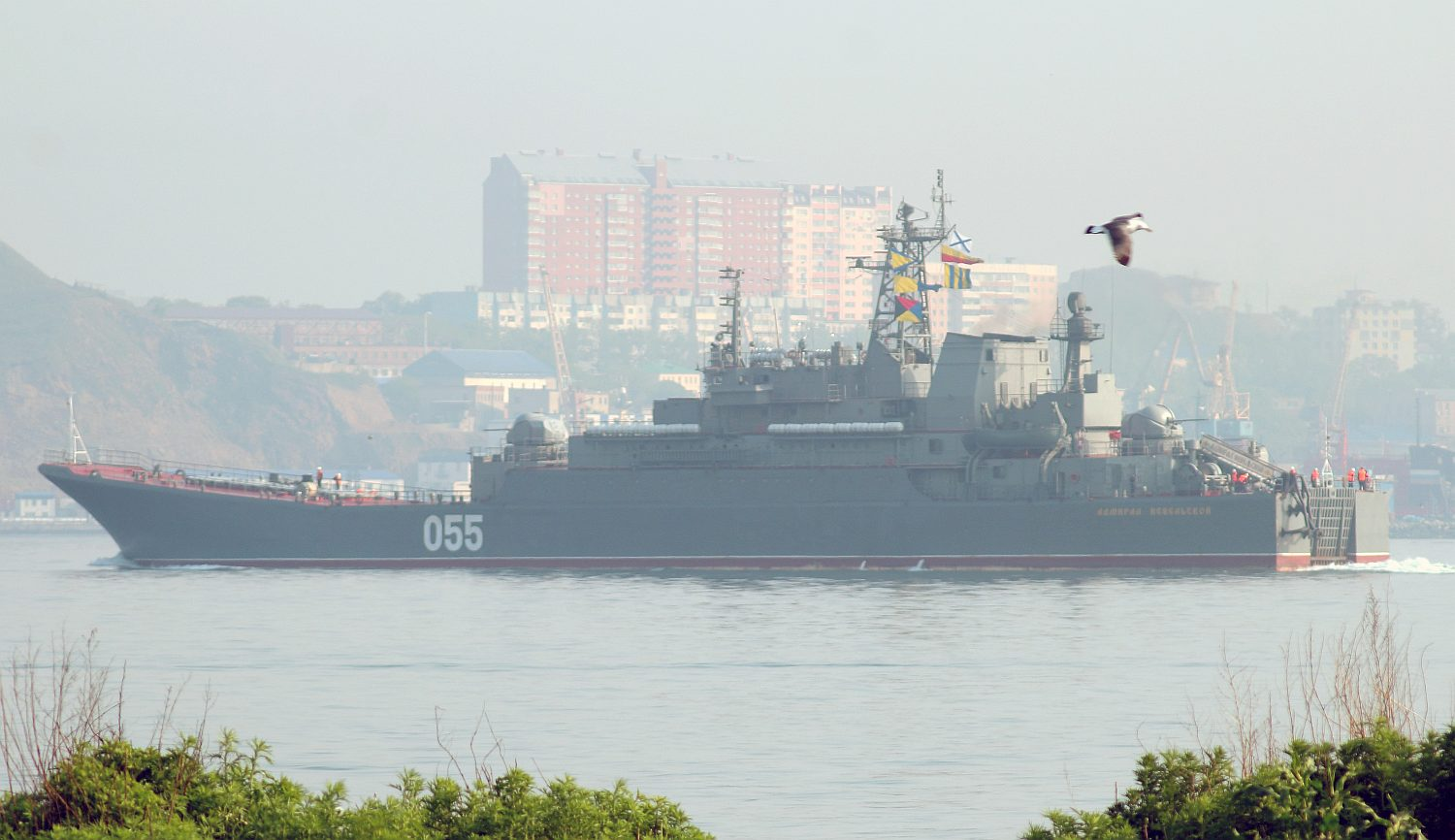

History

Russia
- Name: BDK-98 (1982-2011); Admiral Nevelskoy (2011-present)
- Namesake: Gennady Nevelskoy
- Builder: Stocznia Północna, Gdańsk, Poland
- Laid down: 29 May 1981
- Launched: 21 January 1982
- Commissioned: 28 September 1982
- Home port: Fokino, Primorsky Krai
- Identification: Hull number: 129 (1982); 067 (1982-1987); 079 (1987-1990); 058 (1990-1996); 055 (1996-present)
- Status: In service

General characteristics
- Class & type: Ropucha-class landing ship
- Displacement: 3,450 t (3,396 long tons) standard; 4,080 t (4,016 long tons) full load
- Length: 112.5 m (369 ft 1 in)
- Beam: 15.01 m (49 ft 3 in)
- Draught: 4.26 m (14 ft 0 in)
- Ramps: Over bows and at stern
- Installed power: 3 × 750 kW (1,006 hp) diesel generators
- Propulsion: 2 × 9,600 hp (7,159 kW) Zgoda-Sulzer 16ZVB40/48 diesel engines
- Speed: 18 knots (33 km/h; 21 mph)
- Range: 6,000 nmi (11,000 km; 6,900 mi) at 12 knots (22 km/h; 14 mph); 3,500 nmi (6,500 km; 4,000 mi) at 16 knots (30 km/h; 18 mph)
- Endurance: 30 days
- Capacity: 10 × main battle tanks and 340 troops or 12 × BTR APC and 340 troops or 3 × main battle tanks, 3 × 2S9 Nona-S SPG, 5 × MT-LB APC, 4 trucks and 313 troops or 500 tons of cargo
- Complement: 98
- Armament: 2 × AK-725 twin 57 mm (2.2 in) DP guns; 4 × 8 Strela 2 SAM launchers; 2 × 22 A-215 Grad-M rocket launchers

Admiral Nevelskoy (Russian: Адмирал Невельской) is a Ropucha-class landing ship of the Russian Navy and part of the Pacific Fleet.

Named after the Imperial Russian Navy officer and explorer of the Pacific Gennady Nevelskoy, the ship was built in Poland and launched in 1982. She was named BDK-98 (Russian: БДК-98) for Russian: Большой десантный корабль, romanized: Bolshoy desantnyi korabl', lit. 'large landing ship', from her construction until being renamed Admiral Nevelskoy in 2011. She is one of the subtype of the Ropucha-class landing ships, designated Project 775/II by the Russian Navy.

== Construction and commissioning ==
Admiral Nevelskoy was built as BDK-98 by Stocznia Północna, part of Gdańsk Shipyard, in Gdańsk, in what was then the Polish People's Republic. She was laid down on 29 May 1981, and launched on 21 January 1982. She was commissioned into the Soviet Navy on 28 September 1982 as part of its Pacific Fleet, homeported in Fokino, Primorsky Krai, and with the dissolution of the Soviet Union in late December 1991, she went on to serve in the Russian Navy.

== Career ==
In service since 1985 as BDK-98, she was renamed Admiral Nevelskoy on 24 July 2011. From 1 to 5 July 2007, she was the host ship for a port visit to Vladivostok by a US detachment of warships. She left her Pacific homepart on 19 March 2013, with the Pacific Fleet destroyer Admiral Panteleyev, her sister ships Oslyabya and Peresvet, the tanker Pechenga, and the ocean-going tug Fotiy Krylov. Admiral Nevelskoy and Peresvet sailed on to the Black Sea port of Novorossiysk, where they arrived on 24 May 2013. She then operated from September 2013 as part of the navy's permanent task force. She had returned to the Pacific by May 2014, when she and other Pacific Fleet ships visited China. She then began a refit at the Far Eastern Shipbuilding and Ship Repair Centre, works which were completed in March 2015. On 24 July 2015, she began several sailings between Vanino in Khabarovsk Krai to Kholmsk on Sakhalin Island, to ease a backlog of traffic on civilian vessels after Typhoon Chan-hom disrupted the Vanino–Kholmsk train ferry sailings for several days. By the end of her deployment on this task on 28 July, she had transported 350 passengers to Sakhalin. She took part in a naval parade at Korsakov on 2 September 2015 to commemorate the 70th anniversary of the end of the Second World War.

In July 2023, Admiral Nevelskoy deployed for mine exercises with the Pacific Fleet minesweeper Yakov Balyayev. In April 2024, she carried out landing exercises in Ussuri Bay. In December 2024, she conducted exercises off the Kuril Islands. In February 2025, she was again at sea for exercises, in Peter the Great Bay.
