= Russian landing ship Yamal =

Russian Navy landing ship

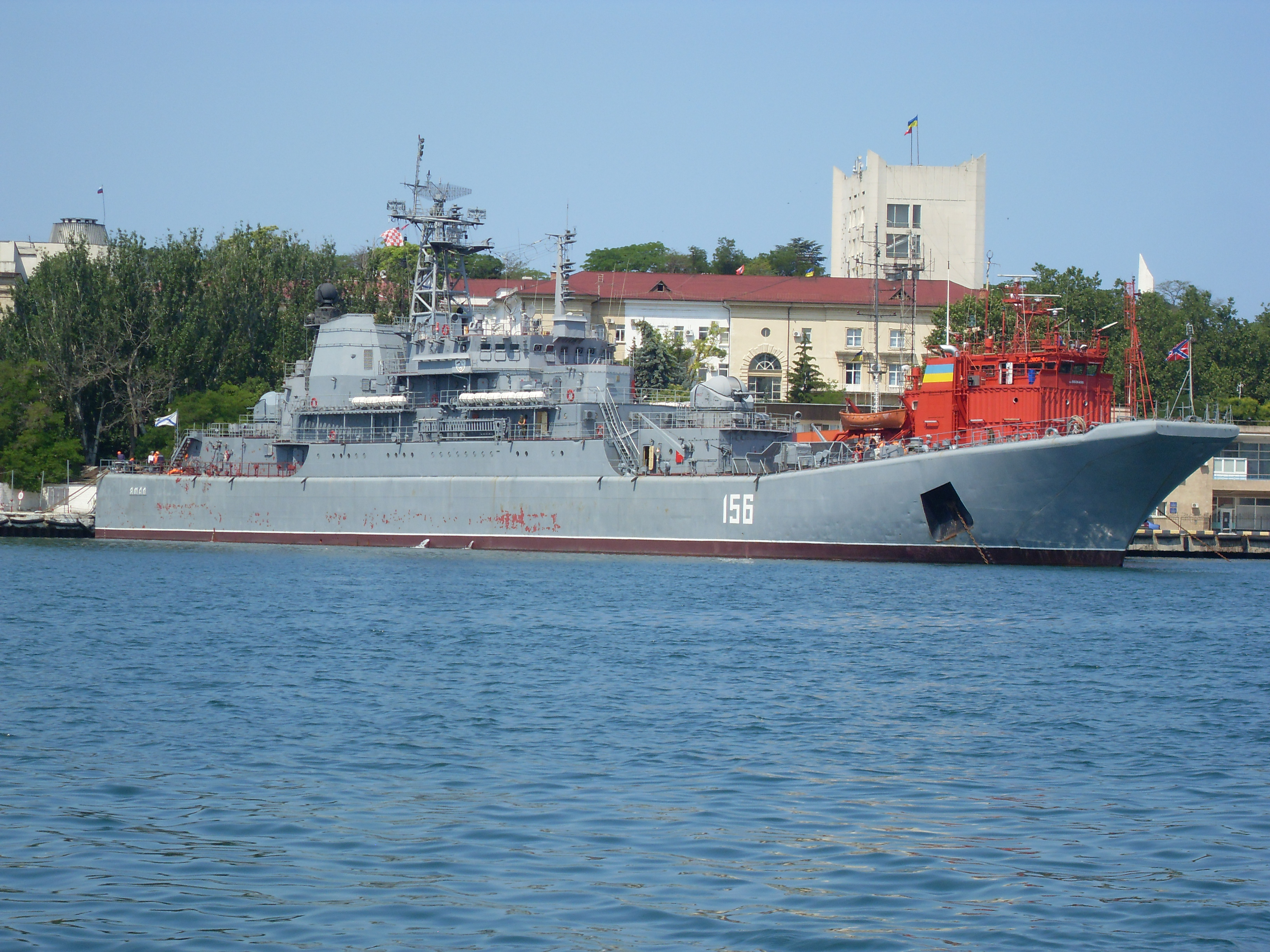
- Yamal in 2011

History

Russia
- Name: Yamal
- Namesake: Yamal Peninsula
- Builder: Stocznia Północna, Gdańsk, Poland
- Commissioned: 30 April 1988
- Home port: Sevastopol
- Identification: Hull number: 156

General characteristics
- Class & type: Ropucha-class landing ship

Service record
- Part of: Black Sea Fleet
- Operations: Russo-Ukrainian war

Yamal (BDK-67) is a Ropucha-class landing ship of the Russian Navy and part of the Black Sea Fleet. The ship was built in Poland and launched in 1988.

== History ==
=== Russian invasion of Ukraine ===
In the third year of the Russian invasion of Ukraine, on 24 March 2024, Yamal and her sister ship Azov were hit by Ukrainian cruise missiles while they were in their home port of Sevastopol, according to the Ukrainian general staff. Eyewitnesses reported explosions during the night. Subsequent satellite images did not reveal any damage, showing that the missile hit the pier next to the ship presumably due to the electronic warfare system.

According to Ukraine’s Defense Intelligence, the ship was hit in the night of 19 April 2026 in Sevastopol Bay along with the Tapir-class landing ship Nikolai Filchenkov, and both may have been subsequently taken out of service.
