= Russian landing ship Azov =

Russian Navy landing ship

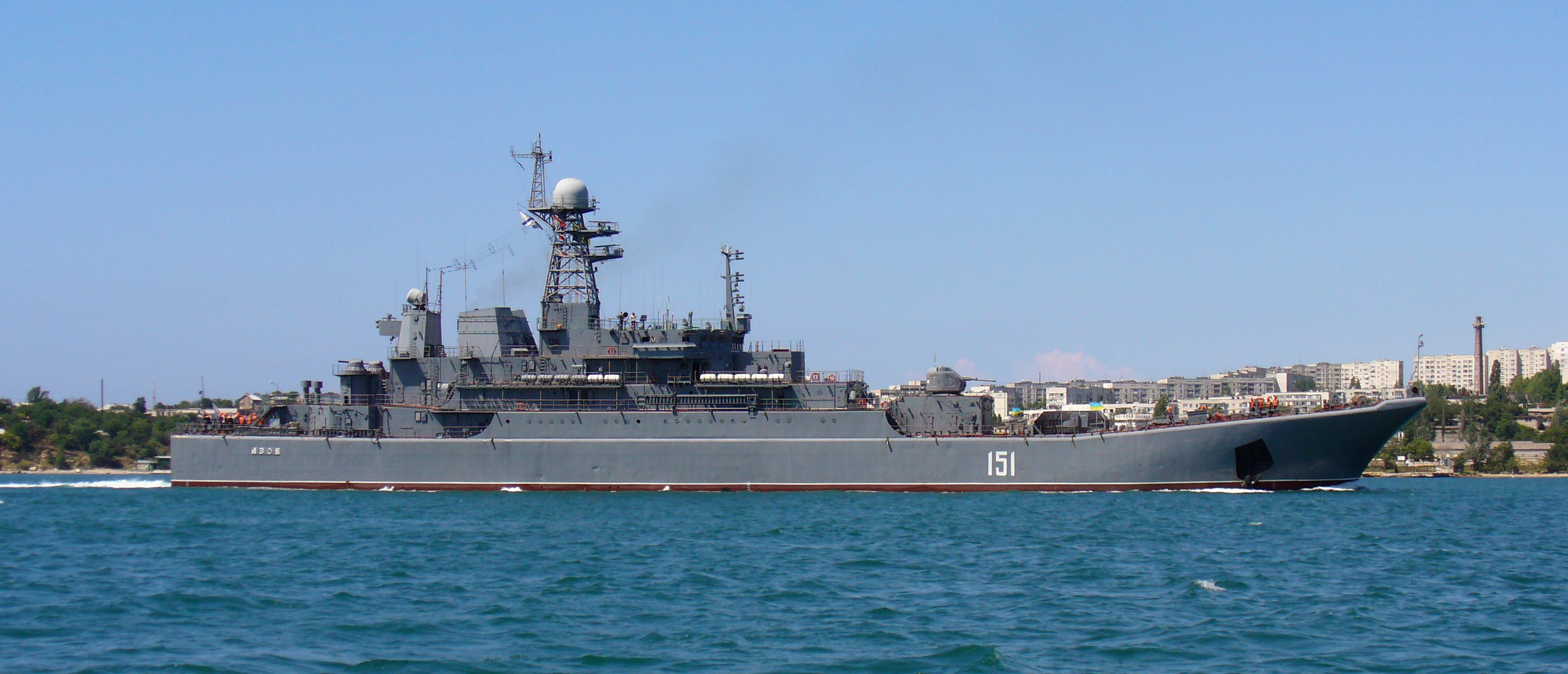
- Azov in port, 2008

History

Russia
- Name: Azov
- Namesake: Sea of Azov
- Builder: Stocznia Północna, Gdańsk, Poland
- Laid down: 22 November 1988
- Launched: 19 May 1989
- Commissioned: 12 October 1990
- Home port: Sevastopol
- Identification: Hull number: 151

General characteristics
- Class & type: Ropucha-class landing ship
- Displacement: 3,450 t (3,396 long tons) standard; 4,080 t (4,016 long tons) full load
- Length: 112.5 m (369 ft 1 in)
- Beam: 15.01 m (49 ft 3 in)
- Draught: 4.26 m (14 ft 0 in)
- Ramps: Over bows and at stern
- Installed power: 3 × 750 kW (1,006 hp) diesel generators
- Propulsion: 2 × 9,600 hp (7,159 kW) Zgoda-Sulzer 16ZVB40/48 diesel engines
- Speed: 18 knots (33 km/h; 21 mph)
- Range: 6,000 nmi (11,000 km; 6,900 mi) at 12 knots (22 km/h; 14 mph); 3,500 nmi (6,500 km; 4,000 mi) at 16 knots (30 km/h; 18 mph)
- Endurance: 30 days
- Capacity: 10 × main battle tanks and 340 troops or 12 × BTR APC and 340 troops or 3 × main battle tanks, 3 × 2S9 Nona-S SPG, 5 × MT-LB APC, 4 trucks and 313 troops or 500 tons of cargo
- Complement: 98
- Armament: 2 × AK-725 twin 57 mm (2.2 in) DP guns; 4 × 8 Strela 2 SAM launchers; 2 × 22 A-215 Grad-M rocket launchers

Service record
- Part of: Black Sea Fleet; 197th Landing Ship Brigade
- Operations: Russo-Ukrainian war

Azov (BDK-54) is a Ropucha-class landing ship of the Russian Navy and part of the Black Sea Fleet. Named after the Sea of Azov, the ship was built in Poland and launched in 1989.

== History ==
=== Russian invasion of Ukraine ===
In 2021, it was reported that Azov was a part of Russia's Black Sea Fleet, stationed in Crimea, participating in amphibious warfare training. In June 2022, Azov was among the Black Sea Fleet vessels reported to be operational and available for amphibious landings in the Black Sea by Russian sources.

On 24 March 2024, the Ukrainian general staff and open-source intelligence sources reported that Azov and her sister ship Yamal were hit by cruise missiles while they were in their home port of Sevastopol. Eyewitnesses reported explosions during the night. Satellite images did not reveal any damage, showing that the missile hit the pier next to the ship presumably due to the electronic warfare system.
