= Pacific Fleet (Russia) =

Russian Navy fleet

- Russian: Тихоокеанский флот
- Russian Pacific Fleet emblem
- Active: 1731–present
- Country: Russian Empire (1731–1917); Russian Republic (1917–1918); Russian State (1918–1920); Far Eastern Republic (1920–1922); Russian SFSR (1922); Soviet Union (1922–1991); Russian Federation (1991–present)
- Branch: Russian Navy
- Role: At sea nuclear deterrence; Naval warfare; Amphibious military operations; Combat patrols in the Pacific/Arctic; Naval presence/diplomacy missions in the Pacific and elsewhere
- Size: 20–24 submarines; 48–51 surface warships (major/minor surface combatants, major amphibious ships, mine countermeasures & patrol vessels); numerous auxiliaries/support ships: 5 nuclear-powered ballistic missile submarines (SSBNs); 8–10 nuclear-powered attack/cruise missile submarines (SSNs/SSGNs); 7–9 diesel/electric-powered attack submarines (SSKs – incl. two deployed in the Baltic as of mid-2025); c. 10 major surface combatants (cruiser, destroyers, multi-role corvettes); 17–20 minor surface combatants (light corvettes); 4 major amphibious ships; 10 mine countermeasures vessels; 7 patrol vessels; numerous support ships/auxiliaires; Some surface warships/submarines inactive as of 2025
- Part of: Russian Armed Forces
- Garrison/HQ: Fokino (HQ); Petropavlovsk-Kamchatsky; Vilyuchinsk
- Engagements: Crimean War; Russo-Japanese War; World War I October Revolution; Russian Civil War; World War II; Anti Piracy operation in Somalia
- Decorations: Order of the Red Banner

Commanders
- Current commander: Adm. Viktor Liina
- Notable commanders: Adm. Nikolay Kuznetsov; Adm. Ivan Yumashev; Adm. Zinovy Rozhestvensky

The Pacific Fleet (Russian: Тихоокеанский флот, ТОФ, romanized: Tikhookeansky flot, TOF) is the Russian Navy fleet in the Pacific Ocean. Established in 1731 as part of the Imperial Russian Navy, the fleet was known as the Okhotsk Military Flotilla (1731–1856) and Siberian Military Flotilla (1856–1918), formed to defend Russian interests in the Russian Far East region along the Pacific coast. In 1918, the fleet was de jure inherited by the Russian Socialist Federative Soviet Republic, then the Soviet Union in 1922 as part of the Soviet Navy, being reformed several times before being disbanded in 1926. In 1932, it was re-established as the Pacific Fleet, and was known as the Red Banner Pacific Fleet (Краснознамённый Тихоокеанский флот, Krasnoznamyonnyy Tikhookeansky flot) after World War II as it had earned the Order of the Red Banner. In the Soviet years, the fleet was also responsible for the Soviet Navy's operations in the Indian Ocean and Arabian Sea. Following the collapse of the Soviet Union in 1991, the Red Banner Pacific Fleet was inherited by the Russian Federation as part of the Russian Navy and its current name was adopted.

The Pacific Fleet's headquarters is located in Vladivostok with numerous facilities within the Peter the Great Gulf in Primorsky Krai, and Petropavlovsk-Kamchatsky and Vilyuchinsk in Avacha Bay on the Kamchatka Peninsula in Kamchatka Krai. Following the APEC Russia 2012 summit, it was announced that the main naval base of the Pacific Fleet in the Russian Far East will be moved to Fokino. The current commander is Admiral Viktor Liina, who has held the position since April 2023.

== History ==
In 1731, the Imperial Russian Navy created the Okhotsk Military Flotilla (Охотская военная флотилия, Okhotskaya voyennaya flotiliya) under its first commander, Grigory Skornyakov-Pisarev, to patrol and transport government goods to and from Kamchatka. In 1799, 3 frigates and 3 smaller ships were sent to Okhotsk under the command of Rear-Admiral I. Fomin to form a functioning military flotilla.

In 1741, Vitus Bering claimed the Alaskan country for the Russian Empire. Russia later confirmed its rule over the territory with the Ukase of 1799. Subsequently, Russian exploration in the Pacific increased. In 1814, a Russian mission in Hawaiian waters secured agreements with local rulers ceding rights and territory (including half of Oahu) to Russia. However, the agreements remained unfulfilled due to British opposition.

In 1849, Petropavlovsk-Kamchatsky became the Flotilla's principal base, which a year later would be transferred to Nikolayevsk-on-Amur and later to Vladivostok in 1871. In 1854, the men of the Flotilla distinguished themselves in the defence of Petropavlovsk during the Crimean War, (1853–1856). Although heavily outnumbered, the Russian garrison, supported by the frigate Aurora and the transport vessel Dwina, defeated a combined Franco-British assault force. In 1856, the Okhotsk Military Flotilla changed its name to the "Siberian Military Flotilla" (Сибирская военная флотилия, Sibirskaya voyennaya flotiliya). Despite local military successes, Russia's experience in the Crimean War led it to acknowledge the inherent weaknesses of its position in the Pacific, and in 1867 it consolidated its territorial holdings by selling Alaska to the United States in hopes of offsetting British interests in the Pacific.

In 1860, the provisions of the Convention of Peking ceded parts of Outer Manchuria in northeastern China, including the modern day krai of Primorsky Krai to the Russian Empire. A large squadron under Rear Admiral A. A. Popov was sent from the Baltic Fleet to the Pacific Ocean. During the American Civil War ships of the squadron visited San Francisco while the Baltic Fleet visited New York City. Parts of the squadron, including the Finnish corvette Kalevala, returned to the Baltic in 1865.

Starting in 1898 with the Russian occupation and lease of Port Arthur in southern Manchuria, Russia took steps to enhance its position in the Far East and strengthen its military and naval forces in the region. Japan came to view Russia's build-up as a threat, and Russia's occupation of Port Arthur itself as an unacceptable humiliation, having been forced out of the region by Russia, Germany and France in 1895. Owing to a gradual deterioration in Russo-Japanese relations, the Imperial Russian government adopted a special shipbuilding program to meet the needs of the Russian Far East region.

During the Boxer Rebellion in 1900, Russian ground and naval forces in the Far East played an important role in the allied campaign to quell anti-Western elements in China. The Russian Navy assisted in capturing the Chinese forts at Taku which blocked the mouth of the Pei-Ho River.

By the beginning of the Russo-Japanese War of 1904–1905, while Imperial Russian naval forces were overall larger than the Japanese Navy, the Russian fleets were geographically divided and the Japanese fleet ultimately proved to be significantly superior in quality.

=== Russo-Japanese War ===
On the night of February 8, 1904 the Imperial Japanese Navy under the command of Tōgō Heihachirō began military operations against the Russian Empire without a declaration of war. As a result of the sudden attack on Port Arthur, two Russian battleships were seriously damaged by torpedoes. This attack developed into a full-scale battle known as the Siege of Port Arthur. The next morning, several attempts by the Japanese Navy to attack the Russian fleet failed due to coastal artillery fire and return fire from the Russian ships that the Japanese had failed to destroy.

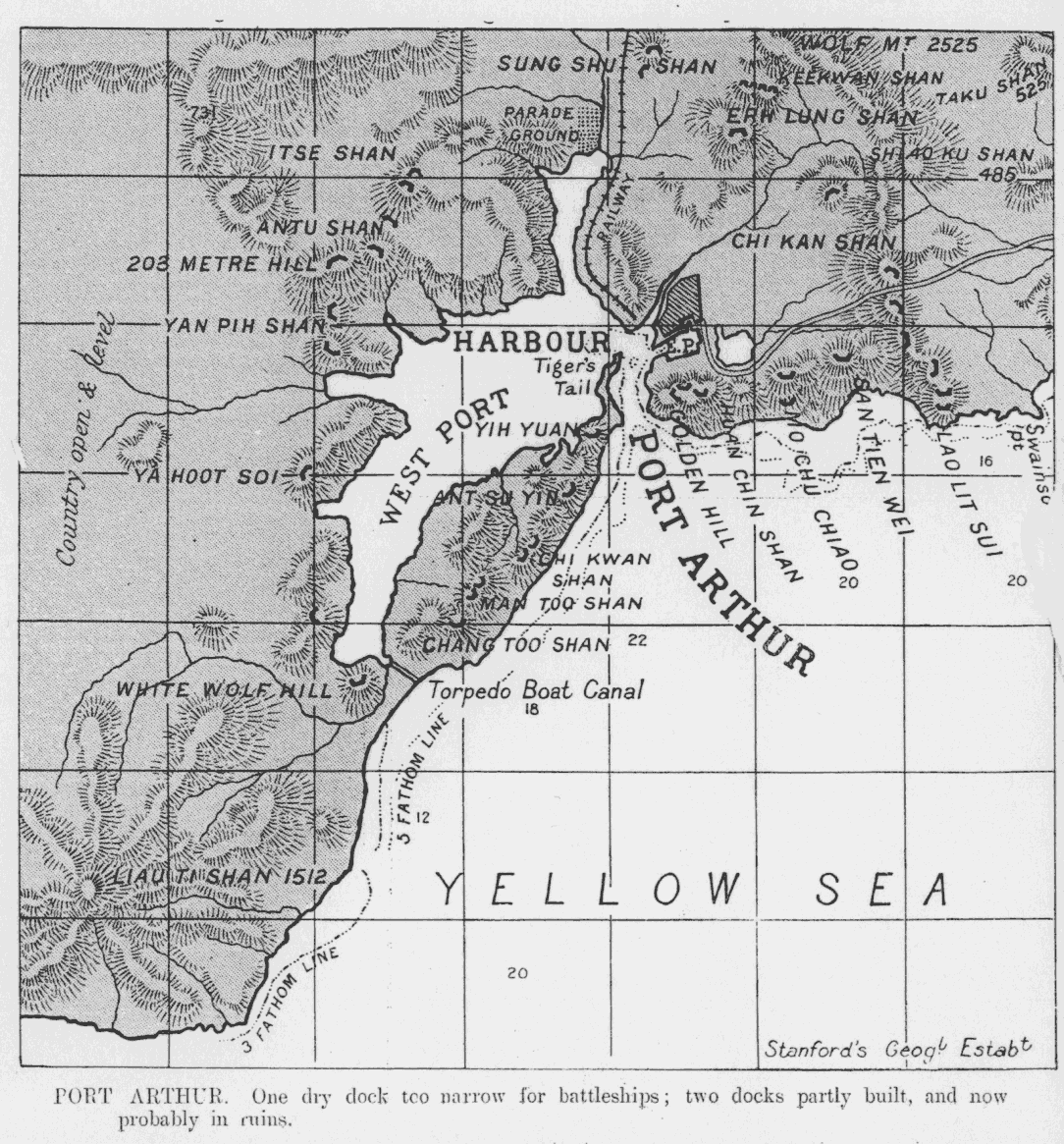
Map of Port Arthur

After failing to completely destroy the Russian fleet at Port Arthur, the Japanese fleet tried to close off access to it. The attempt to totally seal off the port was also unsuccessful.

In March, Vice Admiral Stepan Makarov took command of the "First Pacific Squadron" (Pacific Fleet) to lift the Japanese blockade of Port Arthur. By that time, both sides began to widely use the tactics of mining sea lanes near the ports. For the first time in history, mines were used by the attacking side - before that, mines were used only for defensive purposes in order to prevent enemy ships from gaining access to the harbor. Vessels of the fleet sortied to combat Japanese attacks but were reluctant to leave the harbour for full battle on the high seas, especially after the death of Admiral Makarov on April 13, 1904, when he went down with the Russian battleship Petropavlovsk after the ship hit at least one mine.

The Japanese tactics of using mines were quite effective and significantly limited the maneuverability of Russian ships. Soon the Russians adopted the Japanese mining tactics and began to use it for their own purposes. On May 15, 1904, two Japanese battleships, Yashima and Hatsuse, stumbled upon a fresh minefield and exploded after impacting at least two mines each.

The Russian fleet under the command of Rear Admiral Vitgeft made an attempt to break the blockade and go to Vladivostok, but was intercepted and turned back after the battle of the Yellow Sea. The remnants of the Russian squadron in Port Arthur were targeted by Japanese artillery besieging Port Arthur. Attempts to break the blockade of Port Arthur from the land also failed, and after the Battle of Liaoyang in late August, Russian forces retreated to Mukden (Shenyang) where another battle was fought and lost by the Russians in February/March 1905. Port Arthur itself had fallen to the Japanese on January 2, 1905.

The Russian command sent a squadron of the Baltic Fleet under the command of Admiral Zinovy Rozhestvensky to help besieged Port Arthur around the Cape of Good Hope across the Atlantic, Indian and Pacific Oceans. However, the fleet arrived too late to relieve Port Arthur, whose garrison surrendered before the fleet arrived. On October 21, 1904, this fleet almost provoked a war with the British Empire (an ally of Japan, but a neutral state during this war) during the Dogger Bank incident, when the Russian fleet shelled British fishing vessels, mistaking them for Japanese destroyers. After a seven-month journey, the squadron was destroyed by the Japanese fleet at the Battle of Tsushima in May 1905 before reaching its objective, and thus ending the war with a Japanese victory.

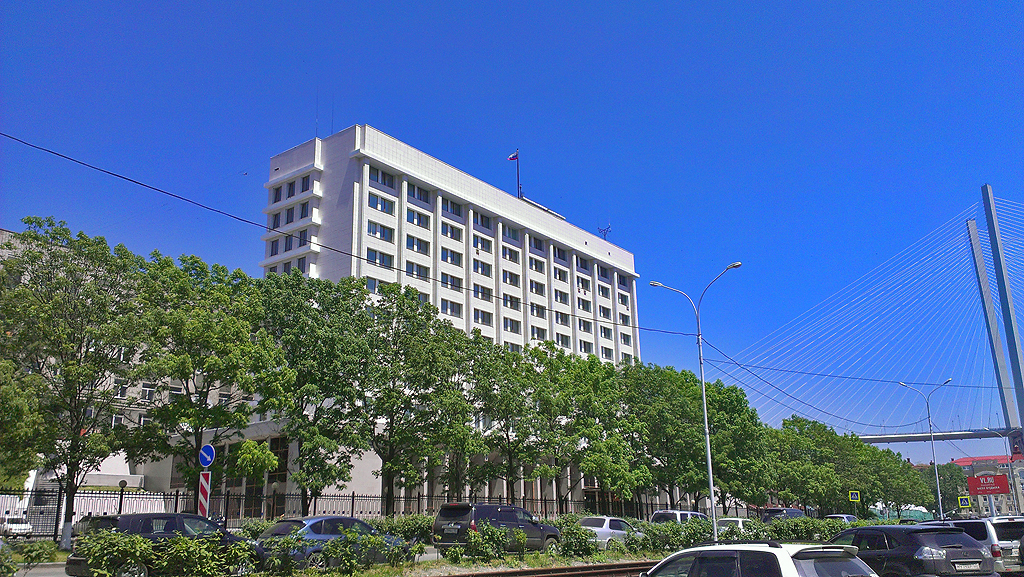
The headquarters of the Pacific Fleet in Vladivostok

=== Aftermath and start of the Soviet period ===
During the Russian Revolution of 1905, the sailors of the Pacific Fleet were actively engaged in the revolutionary movement, participating in armed revolts in Vladivostok in January 1906 and October 1907. On October 29, 1907 the destroyer Skory was seized by mutinous sailors in Vladivostok and shelled the city and other military positions. Ultimately 203 individuals were charged with mutiny and twenty were condemned to be shot.

The remnants of the Pacific Fleet played a very limited during the First World War given the neutralization of German naval elements in the Pacific by the allies in the first year of the war. While the Russian cruiser Zhemchug was tasked to assist allied forces in pursuing ships of the German East Asia Squadron, she ended up being sunk by the German light cruiser Emden in October 1914. During the October Revolution of 1917, the sailors of the Siberian and Amur military flotillas fought for the establishment of Soviet authority in the Far East and against the White army and interventionists. In the course of the Russian Civil War, almost all of the ships of the Pacific Fleet were seized by the White army and the Japanese. The Bolsheviks did not establish full control until Japanese forces withdrew from Vladivostok in October 1922.

After the departure of the Japanese, the Soviets created the Naval Forces of the Far East, under commander Ivan Kozhanov, as a part of the Vladivostok unit, and the Amur Military Flotilla (Амурская военная флотилия, or Amurskaya voyennaya flotiliya). In 1926, these were disbanded: the Vladivostok unit was transferred to the command of the frontier troops in the Far East, and the Amur flotilla became a flotilla of its own.

=== Establishment in 1932 ===
Owing to Japanese aggression in Manchuria in 1931, the Central Committee and the Soviet government decided to create the Naval Forces in the Far East on 13 April 1932. In January 1935, they were renamed the Pacific Fleet, under commander Mikhail Viktorov. The creation of the fleet entailed great difficulties. The first units were formed with small ships delivered by railroad. In 1932, the torpedo boat squadron and eight submarines were put into service. In 1934, the Pacific Fleet received 26 small submarines. The creation of the naval aviation and coastal artillery was underway. In 1937, they opened the Pacific Military School.

By the beginning of World War II, the Pacific Fleet had two surface ship subdivisions, four submarine subdivisions, one torpedo boat subdivision, a few squadrons of ships and patrol boats, airborne units, coastal artillery and marines.

Like all elements in Soviet society, the navy (including the Pacific Fleet) was decimated by the Stalin purges of the 1930s. At least 30 percent of the Soviet Army and Navy officer corps, including three of the four fleet commanders, were arrested and shot or sent to the gulags. These included two commanders of the Pacific Fleet (Admirals Mikhail Viktorov and Grigory Kireyev) who were shot in succession.

=== World War II ===
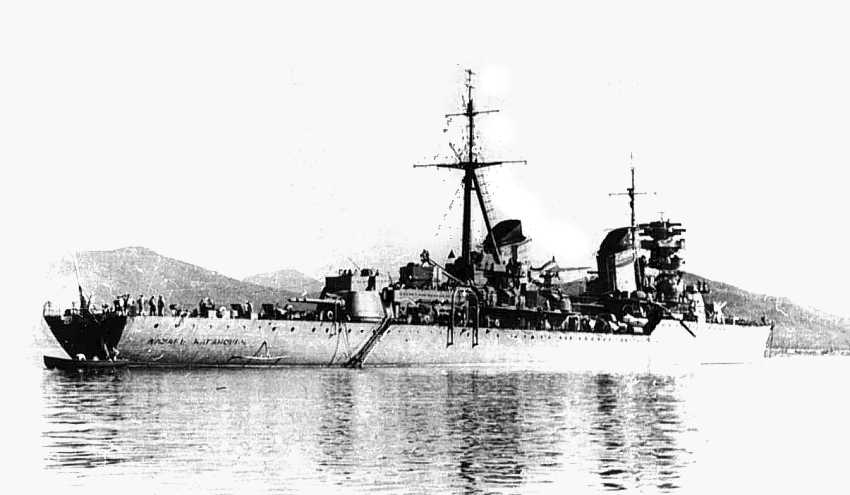
Light cruiser Lazar Kaganovich

During the Great Patriotic War (the Soviet World War II campaign against Germany from 1941 to 1945) the Pacific Fleet was in a permanent state of alert and ready for action, although the Soviets remained neutral with respect to the Empire of Japan, the only Axis power in the Pacific, even after Japan entered World War II. At the same time, the Soviets transferred a destroyer leader, two destroyers, and six submarines from the Pacific Fleet to the Northern Fleet. More than 140,000 sailors from the Pacific Fleet were incorporated in the rifle brigades and other units on the Soviet front against Germans in Europe. In August 1945, the Pacific fleet consisted of two cruisers, one destroyer leader, 12 destroyers, 19 escorts, 78 submarines, 10 minelayers, 52 minesweepers, 49 submarine chasers, 204 PT boats, 19 landing ships, and 1,549 aircraft. In addition, the Amur Flotilla had about 200 ships and 70 aircraft.

During the Soviet–Japanese War of 1945, the Pacific Fleet participated in operations against Japanese forces in northern Korea which constituted an element of the Soviet Union's Manchurian Operation of 1945. At the Potsdam Conference in July 1945, the Soviets added Russian control over the Kuril Islands to their aims as part of entering the war against Japan. As a result, in August 1945 Soviet naval and ground forces invaded both the Kuril Ilands and southern Sakhalin. The Soviet Union then subsequently annexed these territories.

Thousands of sailors and officers were awarded orders and medals for outstanding military service; more than fifty men received the title Hero of the Soviet Union. Eighteen ships and fleet units received the title of the Soviet Guards, and sixteen were awarded the Order of the Red Banner.

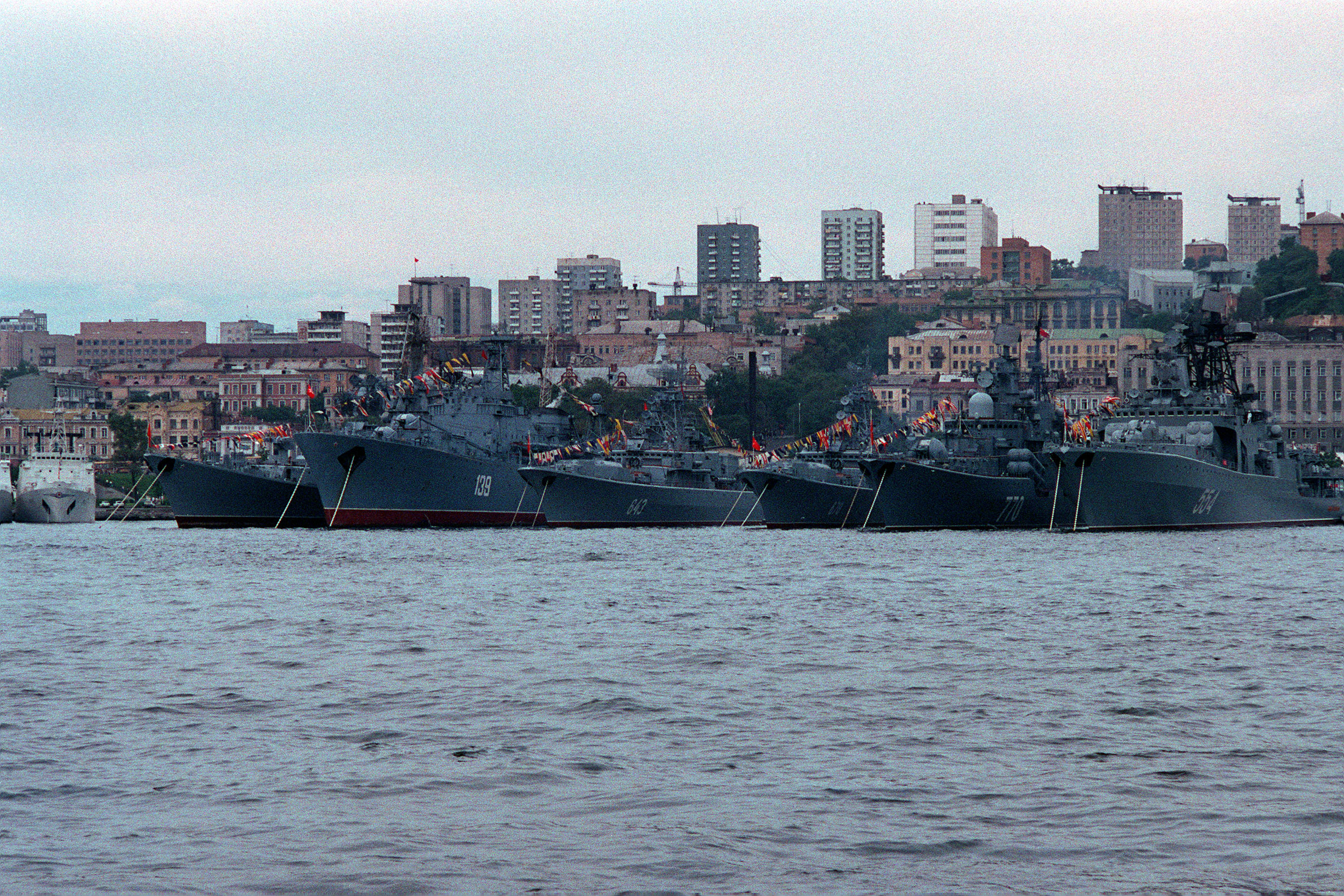
Ships of the Soviet Pacific Fleet at Vladivostok in 1990

=== Cold War ===
On 5 May 1965, the Pacific Fleet itself was awarded with the Order of the Red Banner.

The Pacific Fleet started deploying forces to the Indian Ocean, and established the 8th Operational (Indian Ocean) Squadron in 1968, after the British government announced its intention to withdraw its military forces east of the Suez Canal by 1971. In addition to the defensive function of balancing the naval strength in the Indian Ocean against that of the United States Navy, the 8th Squadron played a role in promoting Soviet foreign policy. Regular visits and port calls were made in the Indian subcontinent, the Persian Gulf, and the East African coast.

The 8th Operational Squadron grew quite substantial at times. In 1980, a Soviet flotilla of 'about ten guided missile cruisers, destroyers and frigates and more than a dozen support ships' was juxtaposed to the U.S. Navy's Task Force 70 in the region. There were also 23 other Soviet ships in the South China Sea, at the same time. In addition, Soviet Ilyushin Il-38 reconnaissance planes, based in Aden or Ethiopia, maintained a close watch on U.S. vessels, as did Ka-25 Hormone helicopters from Soviet warships.

During the 1979 Sino-Vietnam border war, the Pacific Fleet deployed a task force of ships and submarines to the South China Sea. The deployment, designed to support Vietnam and deter potentially more aggressive Chinese action, was complemented by a similarly extensive presence of Soviet vessels in the Indian Ocean, and was consistent with the objectives established by the head of the Soviet Navy, Admiral Sergei Gorshkov to extend “Soviet military, political and economic influence throughout the world.”

In 1981 the fleet suffered the loss of many of its senior officers, including its commander in chief, Admiral Emil Spiridonov, when the Tupolev Tu-104 transporting them back to Vladivostok after meetings in Leningrad crashed shortly after takeoff from Pushkin Airport. A total of 16 admirals and generals, and 38 lower ranking officers, were killed.

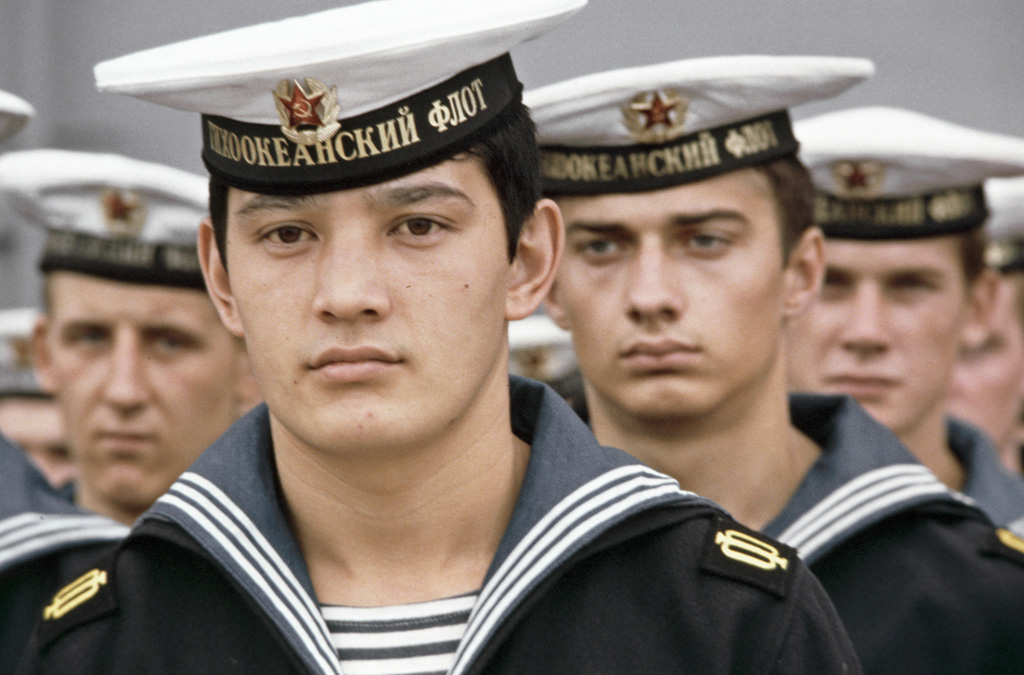
Sailors of the aircraft carrier Novorossiisk, Red Banner Pacific Fleet (1984)

In the 1980s, Soviet naval strategy shifted to an emphasis on bastion defense, fortifying the Sea of Okhotsk for that purpose. By the mid-1980s, the Pacific Fleet had constituted 32% of all Soviet naval assets, up from 28% in 1975 and 25% in 1965. It included approximately 800 ships, over 120 submarines, and 98 surface combatants. Two of the ships were aircraft carriers Minsk and Novorossiysk, which served from the 1970s and 1980s to the 1990s. The battlecruiser Admiral Lazarev of the Kirov class served with the fleet in the 1980s and 1990s as well.

In 1988 the Primorskiy Flotilla (Military Unit Number 20885) comprised the 165th Missile Ship Brigade (Uliss Bay (Vladivostok)); the 202nd Anti-Submarine Warfare Brigade (Abrek Bay (Fokino), Primorskiy Kray); the 4th Brigade of Constructed and Overhauled Submarines (Vladivostok, Primorskiy Kray); the 72nd Brigade of Constructed and Overhauled Submarines (Bolshoy Kamen, Primorskiy Kray); the 45th and 47th Coastal Defence Brigades; the 7th Minesweeper Brigade (Razboynik Bay (Vladivostok), Primorskiy Kray); and the 19th Submarine Brigade (Uliss Bay, Vladivostok.

=== Under the Russian Federation ===
In the 1990s and 2000s with the collapse of the Soviet Union, the Pacific Fleet lost many of its larger units. The Fleet lost all of its aircraft carriers and many other major vessels, and by early 2000 only one cruiser remained active with the Fleet. This evolved the Pacific Fleet of the Russian Federation into a largely defensive force.

The 1990s witnessed a considerable deterioration in infrastructure. May 1992 saw the first of five large ammunition explosions at Pacific Fleet storage depots, 1992–2003. The blast rocked the city of Vladivostok.

==== 2008 submarine accident ====
An accident aboard Nerpa, a nuclear-powered attack submarine doing a test run during sea trials in the Sea of Japan on 8 November 2008, killed more than 20 people, marking the worst submarine disaster since Kursk sank in 2000. Nerpa was an Akula-class submarine belonging to the Pacific Fleet. Its construction began in 1991, but was delayed due to lack of funding.

==== 2010s & 2020s: Rennaissance of the Fleet ====
A slow rennaissance of the fleet began in the 2010s. Plans for deployment of new large units to the Fleet were announced in the early 2010s. Several new ballistic missile submarines, and large cruisers were projected to join the Fleet. However, these plans evolved over the course of the decade with a changed focus by 2020 on light units and submarines to renew the fleet. In this regard, the focus is now on new general purpose frigates (Gorshkov-class), multi-role and missile corvettes (Steregushchiy-class, Gremyashchiy-class and Karakurt-class) as well as on a full range of new submarines (the Borei, Yasen and Improved Kilo classes). Vessels of these classes are all projected to enter service through the 2020s. From the early 2020s, with the arrival of the Borei and Yasen classes, Russian submarine activity in the region, and the length of submarine patrols, began to increase.

In addition, the Pacific Fleet's amphibious capabilities will be modernized in the mid-latter 2020s through the acquisition of one or more of the Ivan Gren-class landing ships and possibly one of the new Ivan Rogov-class helicopter assault ships. These plans coincided with a seeming broader intent to expand all Russian naval infantry brigades into division-sized formations. In the Pacific, the combined expansion of the strength of the naval infantry and the fleet's amphibious shipping would enhance Russian power projection capabilities; though all of these plans await the outcome of the Russo-Ukraine War.

While existing ballistic-missile submarine production has fully replaced and increased the numbers of SSBNs in the Pacific Fleet, it is unclear that the production of the Yasen-class vessels, and potential follow-on models, will be sufficient to replace aging older nuclear attack and cruise missile submarines on a one-for-one basis. Reports suggest that Russian third-generation nuclear submarines have not been modernized to a level to avoid block obsolescence before 2030. The 2016 decision to add six new "Improved Kilo"-class conventionally-powered submarines to the fleet (all of which were commissioned by 2025) may be partly designed to mitigate such a gap.

This enhancement in capabilities was coupled with stronger military links between Russia and China. Between 5–12 July 2013, warships from the Russian Pacific Fleet and the North Sea Fleet of the People's Liberation Army Navy participated in Joint Sea 2013, bilateral naval maneuvers held in the Peter the Great Bay. Joint Sea 2013 was the largest naval drills yet undertaken by the PRC's navy with a foreign navy. In 2021, a joint Russian-Chinese squadron sailed around Japan, passing between Japanese islands through the Tsugaru Strait and then the Osumi Strait. The Russian ships in the squadron included the destroyers Admiral Panteleyev and Admiral Tributs, the corvettes Aldar Tsydenzhapov and Gromkiy as well as auxiliaries.

In July 2026, Russian Navy Commander-in-Chief Admiral Alexander Moiseyev stated that the first unmanned systems regiment had been formed in the Northern Fleet and that four additional regiments would also be formed over the course of the year. He claimed that a similar structure would also be adopted in the Pacific Fleet in 2027.

==== 2025 Kamchatka Peninsula earthquake ====
Rybachy, a nuclear submarine base located in Avacha Bay, was damaged by the 2025 Kamchatka Peninsula earthquake and tsunami, according to satellite images.

Satellite imagery showed that one of the base's floating piers had been damaged. The 8.8-magnitude earthquake occurred just 140 kilometers from the base.

== Order of battle ==
Until 2024, the Pacific Fleet had been one component of the Russian Eastern Military District established in 2010. Other components of the Eastern District include the 11th Air and Air Defence Forces Army (providing both aviation and air defence units in the District) as well as four ground force army headquarters (the 5th, 29th, 35th and 36th Combined Arms Armies). Elements of all ground force armies from the Eastern Military District, as well as the Pacific Fleet's naval infantry formations, were reported operating in Ukraine as of 2025. One independent corps HQ (the 68th Guards Corps) had been formed on Sakhalin island prior to the Russo-Ukraine War and elements of the Corps were also deployed in Ukraine.

Pursuant to changes in the command structure made in 2024, the Pacific Fleet is now directly subordinate to the Russian Navy general command and is no longer subordinate to the Eastern Military District. Nevertheless, the Pacific Fleet remains reliant on support from other Russian formations in the region, particuarly from elements of the 11th Air Army of the Russian Air Force.

In addition to the navy, the Russian Coast Guard provides additional patrol capabilities in the Pacific, comprising up to 77 armed patrol vessels of various types.

=== Surface warships ===
Major surface combatants
| # | Type | Name | Class | Year | Notes |
|---|---|---|---|---|---|
| 011 | Cruiser | Varyag | Slava | 1989 | Active as of 2026; Flagship of the Pacific Fleet |
| 543 | Destroyer | Marshal Shaposhnikov | Udaloy I | 1985 | Underwent major upgrade, 2017–21; active as of 2026 |
| 564 | Destroyer | Admiral Tributs | Udaloy I | 1985 | Active as of 2026 |
| 572 | Destroyer | Admiral Vinogradov | Udaloy I | 1988 | Refit as of 2020; upgrading to Marshal Shaposhnikov standard; had been expected to return to service in c. 2024-5 |
| 548 | Destroyer | Admiral Panteleyev | Udaloy I | 1991 | Active as of 2026 |
| 333 | Multi-role Corvette | Sovershennyy | Steregushchiy | 2017 | Active as of 2026 |
| 335 | Multi-role Corvette | Gromkiy | Steregushchiy | 2018 | Active as of 2026 |
| 339 | Multi-role Corvette | Aldar Tsydenzhapov | Steregushchiy | 2020 | Active as of 2025 |
| 343 | Multi-role Corvette | Rezkiy | Steregushchiy | 2023 | Active as of 2026 |
| 337 | Multi-role Corvette | Gremyashchiy | Gremyashchiy | 2020 | Active as of 2026 |

Small Anti-Submarine and Missile Ships (Light ASW & Missile Corvettes)
| # | Type | Name | Class | Year | Notes |
|---|---|---|---|---|---|
| 390 | ASW Corvette | Kholmsk | Grisha | 1985 | Active as of 2022 |
| 350 | ASW Corvette | Sovetskaya Gavan | Grisha | 1990 | Active as of 2024 |
| 332 | ASW Corvette | MPK-107 (former Irkutskiy komsomolets) | Grisha | 1990 | Active as of 2025 |
| 323 | ASW Corvette | Metel (Snowstorm) | Grisha | 1990 | Active as of 2024 |
| 375 | ASW Corvette | MPK-82 | Grisha | 1991 | Active as of 2026 |
| 362 | ASW Corvette | Ust-Ilimsk | Grisha | 1991 | Active as of 2025 |
| 201 | Missile Corvette | Rzhev | Karakurt | Projected 2026? | Sea trials as of 2025; three additional vessels building for the Pacific Fleet |
| 423 | Missile Corvette | Smerch (Tornado) | Nanuchka III | 1984 | Active as of 2026; upgraded with new AK-176MA 76mm main gun and 16x Uran anti-ship missiles |
| 418 | Missile Corvette | Iney? | Nanuchka III | 1987 | Active as of 2022; scheduled for upgrade as of 2020; reported as possibly to be decommissioned in 2021 but still active off Japan as of early 2022 |
| 450? | Missile Corvette | Razliv? | Nanuchka III | 1991 | Status unclear; originally scheduled for upgrade may have decommissioned in 2021 |
| 991 | Missile Corvette | R-261 | Tarantul | 1988 | Active as of 2024 |
| 951 | Missile Corvette | R-297 | Tarantul | 1990 | |
| 971 | Missile Corvette | R-298 | Tarantul | 1990 | Active as of 2026 |
| 940 | Missile Corvette | R-11 | Tarantul | 1991 | Active as of 2022 |
| 924 | Missile Corvette | R-14 | Tarantul | 1991 | Active as of 2026 |
| 937 | Missile Corvette | R-18 | Tarantul | 1992 | Active as of 2025 |
| 978 | Missile Corvette | R-19 | Tarantul | 1992 | Active as of 2026 |
| 921 | Missile Corvette | R-20 | Tarantul | 1993 | Active as of 2026 |
| 946 | Missile Corvette | R-24 | Tarantul | 1994 | Active as of 2026 |
| 916 | Missile Corvette | R-29 | Tarantul | 2003 | Active as of 2026 |

Amphibious Warfare Ships
| # | Type | Name | Class | Year | Notes |
|---|---|---|---|---|---|
| 066 | Landing Ship | Oslyabya | Ropucha | 1981 | Active as of 2026 |
| 055 | Landing Ship | Admiral Nevelskoy | Ropucha | 1982 | Active as of 2025 |
| 077 | Landing Ship | Peresvet | Ropucha | 1991 | Active as of 2024 |
| 081 | Landing Ship | Nikolai Vilkov | Alligator | 1974 | Active as of 2026 |

Landing Craft

- Project 1176 (Ondatra-class) landing craft: 3 vessels (D-57, D-70, D-704)
- Project 11770 (Serna-class) landing craft: 1 vessel (D-107)

=== Submarines ===
| # | Type | Boat | Class | Year | Notes |
|---|---|---|---|---|---|
| K-551 | SSBN | Vladimir Monomakh | Borei | 2014 | Active as of 2020 |
| K-550 | SSBN | Aleksandr Nevskiy | Borei | 2013 | Active as of 2021 |
| K-552 | SSBN | Knyaz Oleg | Borei | 2021 | Active; arrived in the Pacific September 2022 |
| K-553 | SSBN | Generalissimus Suvorov | Borei | 2022 | Active as of 2026 |
| K-553 | SSBN | Emperor Alexander III | Borei | 2023 | Active; arrived in the Pacific September 2024 |
| K-150 | SSGN | Tomsk | Oscar II | 1996 | Active as of 2023 |
| K-456 | SSGN | Tver | Oscar II | 1991 | Status unclear |
| K-442 | SSGN | Chelyabinsk | Oscar II | 1990 | Inactive as of 2024; may be upgraded to carry 3M-54 Kalibr cruise missiles. |
| K-186 | SSGN | Omsk | Oscar II | 1993 | Active as of 2025 |
| K-329 | Projected Special Operations Submarines | Belgorod | Oscar II-class variant | 2022 | As of 2025 deployed in experimental role in the Northern Fleet area of operations; may transfer to the Pacific Fleet in due course |
| K-? | Projected Special Operations Submarines | Khabarovsk | Khabarovsk-class submarine | Projected 2026/2027 | Sea trials in the Northern Fleet area of operations as of 2026; likely to transfer to the Pacific Fleet in due course with dedicated support facility for the submarine being constructed in the Pacific region as of 2026 |
| K-573 | SSN | Novosibirsk | Yasen | 2021 | Active as of 2026 |
| K-571 | SSN | Krasnoyarsk | Yasen | 2023 | Active; arrived in the Pacific September 2024 |
| K-?? | SSN | Perm | Yasen | Projected 2026 | Sea trials in the Northern Fleet operational area as of mid-2025 |
| K-331 | SSN | Magadan? | Akula I | 1990 | Status unclear; name may have changed post-refit given same name assigned to "Improved Kilo"-class boat also assigned to the Pacific Fleet |
| K-419 | SSN | Kuzbass | Akula I | 1992 | Active as of 2022 |
| K-295 | SSN | Samara | Akula II | 1995 | Prolonged refit; May return to service pursuant to modernization |
| B-394 | SSK | Nurlat | Kilo | 1988 | Status unclear; if not already out of service then likely to decommission in mid/latter 2020s |
| B-464 | SSK | Ust'-Kamchatsk | Kilo | 1990 | Status unclear; if not already out of service then likely to decommission in mid/latter 2020s |
| B-187 | SSK | Komsomolsk-na-Amure | Kilo | 1991 | May continue in service to 2030 |
| B-274 | SSK | Petropavlosk-Kamchatsky | Improved Kilo | 2019 | Active as of 2026 |
| B-603 | SSK | Volkov | Improved Kilo | 2020 | Arrived in the Pacific in November 2021. |
| B-602 | SSK | Magadan | Improved Kilo | 2021 | Arrived in the Pacific in October 2022. |
| B-588 | SSK | Ufa | Improved Kilo | 2022 | Active as of 2026 |
| B-608 | SSK | Mozhaysk | Improved Kilo | 2023 | Deployed in the Baltic as of mid-2025 |
| B-610 | SSK | Yakutsk | Improved Kilo | 2025 | Deployed in the Baltic as of June 2025. Arrived in the Pacific in November 2026 through the Northern Sea Route. |

=== Mine Countermeasures Vessels ===
| Name | # | Class | Year | Notes |
|---|---|---|---|---|
| MT-264 | ? | Natya | 1989 | Both reported active as of 2022 |
| MT-265 | ? | Natya | 1989 | Both reported active as of 2022 |
| BT-100 | ? | Sonya | 1984 | Active as of 2024 |
| BT-232 | ? | Sonya | 1988 | Active as of 2023 |
| BT-245 | ? | Sonya | 1989 | Active as of 2024 |
| BT-256 | ? | Sonya | 1988 | Active as of 2024 |
| BT-325 | ? | Sonya | 1985 | Active as of 2024 |
| Yakov Balyayev | 507 | Alexandrit | 2020 | Active as of 2025 |
| Petr Ilyichev | 543 | Alexandrit | 2022 | Active as of 2025 |
| Anatoly Shlemov | 651 | Alexandrit | 2022 | Active as of 2026 |

=== Other surface units ===
Patrol ships

- Ivan Susanin-class patrol ships: Ivan Susanin (active as of 2024)
- Patrol/Anti-Saboteur Boats:
  - Grachonok-class anti-saboteur ship: 6 Vessels (P-377; P-417 Yunarmeets Kamchatki; P-420 Yunarmeets Primorya; P-431 Yunarmeets Chukotki; P-445; P-450 Yunarmeets Sakhalina)

Up to 77 armed patrol vessels deployed with the Coast Guard of the FSB Border Service, including larger corvettes/offshore patrol vessels. See: Russian Coast Guard#Vessels in service

Principal Auxiliaries For a more complete list of Russian navy auxiliaries see: List of active Russian Navy ships#Auxiliaries

Intelligence/Tracking Vessels:

- Vishnya-class intelligence ships:
  - Kareliya; (assigned to 515th division of reconnaissance ships; active as of 2026)
  - Kurily (active as of 2026)
- Marshal Nedelin-class intelligence ship Marshal Krylov (active as of 2026; assigned to the 114th Brigade of the Pacific Fleet)
- Balzam-class intelligence ship Pribaltika (active as of 2024)
- 2 x Project 141 Salvage vessel/ Submersible support: KIL-498 & KIL-927

Fleet Oilers:

- Boris Chilikin-class: 1 vessel (Boris Butoma - active as of 2025)
- Dubna-class: 2 vessels (Irkut active as of 2024; Pechanga active as of 2026)
- Uda-class: 1 vessel (Vishera)
- Altay-class: 2 vessels (Ilim and Izhora - latter vessel reported active as of 2022)

Hydrographic Survey Vessels: 4 Yug-class (Project 862) vessels

- Vice-Admiral Vorontsov (formerly Briz)
- Gals
- Marshal Gelovani
- Pegas

Icebreakers:

- Yevpaty Kolovrat (Project 21180M icebreaker; deployed with the Pacific Fleet as of 2024)

Other Support Ships/Auxiliaries:

- Project 304-class Repair Ships: 6 vessels (PM-5 (may have decommissioned in 2021), PM-15, PM-52, PM-59, PM-92, PM-97, PM-156)
- Akademik Kovalev (Project 20180 ocean-going armaments transport; entered service 2015)
- Igor Belousov (Project 21300C ocean-going rescue ship; entered service 2016; active as of 2026)

=== Naval Aviation ===
Naval Aviation of the Pacific Fleet as of 2023:

- Fighters: 1-2 Squadrons with MiG-31B/M fighters (with K-variant with Kh-47M2 Kinzhal ASMs): 317th Mixed Aviation Regiment; and possibly the 865th "Red Banner Order of Labour Fighter Aviation Regiment PVO" (reported disbanded in 2010 but may have reformed in 2019; status remained unclear) MiG-31s are based at Yelizovo-Petropavlovsk-Kamchatsky Airport (HQ) & also reported at Anadyr airport in the Chukotka region (December 2020) with further potential forward operating locations at Wrangel Island and elsewhere
- Fixed-wing ASW aircraft/helicopters:
  - 1 Squadron with Tu-142MR/MZ/M3 (Bear-F) maritime-patrol/ASW aircraft: (568th Independent Composite Aviation Regiment – HQ at Mongokhto) (M3 (Bear-F) variant reported delivered as of 2020
  - 2 Squadrons with Il-38N ASW aircraft (one part of 317th Mixed Aviation Regiment, reported upgrading with N-model variant of the aircraft as of 2017; & one with 289th Independent Anti-submarine Air Regiment – HQ at Nikolayevka)
  - 3 Squadrons with Ka-27 Helix ASW helicopters (including with 175th Independent Shipborne Anti-submarine Helicopter Squadron – HQ at Yelizovo & the 289th Independent Anti-submarine Air Regiment deploying both Ka-27 ASW and Ka-29 (Helix B) attack helicopters)
- Transport aircraft: 2 Squadrons (incl. 71st Independent Military Transport Air Squadron? – HQ at Nikolayevka, Primorskaya) with An-12BK Cub, An-140-100, An-26 Curl & Tu-134 aircraft.

Additional aviation and air defence assets in the Eastern Military District are deployed as part of the 11th Air and Air Defence Forces Army, including Su-35s at Yelizovo on the Kamchatka Peninsula (deployed there on rotation as of 2021). The Pacific Fleet's aviation element was described as being "heavily dependent" on support from the 11th Air Army.

Tu-95MS and Tu-22M3 bombers (including with Kh-47M2 Kinzhal hypersonic and Kh-32 long-range supersonic anti-ship missiles) are also able to be deployed in a maritime attack role. deployed as part of Russian Long-Range Aviation, including in the Eastern Military District. As of 2023, plans may include the creation of a new heavy bomber regiment with the 326th Heavy Bomber Division (equipped with Tu-160 Blackjack strategic bombers), to be based in the Amur and Irkutsk regions.

=== Ground Forces ===
According to a report from the Institute for the Study of War, in March 2018 the Fleet contained two naval infantry brigades, a coastal brigade, and coastal regiment. However, an expansion of these capabilities, introducing new units and formations, was underway as of 2020/21. As of 2022, there appeared to be a longer-term intent to expand all Russian naval infantry brigades into division-sized formations.

In 2022, both of the Pacific Fleet's naval infantry brigades were transferred to Ukraine for operations as part of the Russian invasion. Up to the end of 2022, both brigades reportedly experienced heavy losses. In April 2022, the 155th Brigade was reportedly awarded the "Guards" title for its service, while the 40th Naval Infantry Brigade was awarded the title in 2023. In September 2025, elements of both brigades were reported operating in eastern Ukraine together with elements from other naval infantry units, including the 177th naval infantry regiment as well as the 61st and 336th naval infantry brigades. As of December 2025, the 155th brigade (now formally designated as the 55th Guards naval infantry "division") was specifically reported as operating in the vicinity of Pokrovsk.

Organization:

- Naval Infantry (deployed to Ukraine as of 2025)
  - 40th Separate Guards Naval Infantry Brigade, Petropavlovsk-Kamchatsky
  - 55th Guards Naval Infantry Division, Vladivostok (formerly 155th Guards Naval Infantry brigade; upgraded to "division" status as of 1 December 2025)
  - 42nd Maritime Recon Point (Special Forces battalion), Vladivostok
- Coastal Defence
  - Division-sized formation reported being established in Chukotka region as of 2021, said to include the 50th coastal defence regiment as of 2023
- Coastal Defence Surface-to-Surface Missile Units
  - 520th Separate Coastal Missile Artillery Brigade, Petropavlovsk-Kamchatsky
    - 2 Battalions/Squadrons with K-300 Bastion Surface-to-Surface Missiles (as of 2018; additional units reported forming with the aim of 3-5 Bastion and 1-2 SSC-6 Bal battalions/squadrons).
  - 72nd Separate Coastal Missile Brigade (units equipped with Bastion SSM (Iturup Island, Matua Island and Paramushir Island) and Bal SSM battalion (Kunashir Island)), HQ: Vladivostok
  - New Coastal Missile Brigade (the 75th brigade) established in 2021 to defend Sakhalin

== Commanders of the Pacific Fleet ==
- Mikhail Vladimirovich Viktorov (from April 1932)
- Grigoriy Petrovich Kireyev (from August 1937)
- Nikolay Gerasimovich Kuznetsov (from January 1938)
- Ivan Stepanovich Yumashev (from August 1939)

In January 1947, the Pacific Fleet was divided into the 5th and 7th fleets:

5th Fleet:

- Aleksandr Sergeyevich Frolov (from January 1947)
- Nikolay Gerasimovich Kuznetsov (from February 1950)
- Yuriy Aleksandrovich Panteleyev (August 1951 – January 1953)

7th Fleet:

- Ivan Ivanovich Baykov (from January 1947)
- Georgy Kholostyakov (November 1951 – May 1953)

In April 1953, the Fleets were once again combined under one Pacific Fleet command:

- Yuriy Aleksandrovich Panteleyev (from January 1953)
- Valentin Andreyevich Chekurov (from January 1956)
- Vitaliy Alekseyevich Fokin (from February 1958)
- Nikolai Nikolayevich Amelko (from June 1962)
- Nikolay Ivanovich Smirnov (from March 1969)
- Vladimir Petrovich Maslov (from September 1974)
- Emil Nikolayevich Spiridonov (from August 1979)
- Vladimir Vasilyevich Sidorov (from February 1986)
- Gennadiy Aleksandrovich Khvatov (From December 1986)
- Georgiy Nikolayevich Gurinov (from March 1993)
- Igor Nikolayevich Khmelnov (from August 1994)
- Vladimir Ivanovich Kuroyedov (from February 1996)
- Mikhail Georgiyevich Zakharenko (from July 1997)
- Gennady Aleksandrovich Suchkov (from July 2001)
- Viktor Dmitriyevich Fyodorov (from December 2001)
- Konstantin Semyonovich Sidenko (from December 2007)
- Sergey Iosifovich Avakyants (Acting from August 2010 – appointed Commander since 3 May 2012)
- Viktor Liina (From April 2023)

== See also ==
- Grigory Pasko – former officer of the Russian Navy, editor of Boyevaya Vakhta (Battle Watch), in-house newspaper of the Pacific Fleet, and prisoner of conscience
- Bechevinka, former submarine base of the fleet
