= Russian landing ship Oslyabya =

Russian Navy landing ship

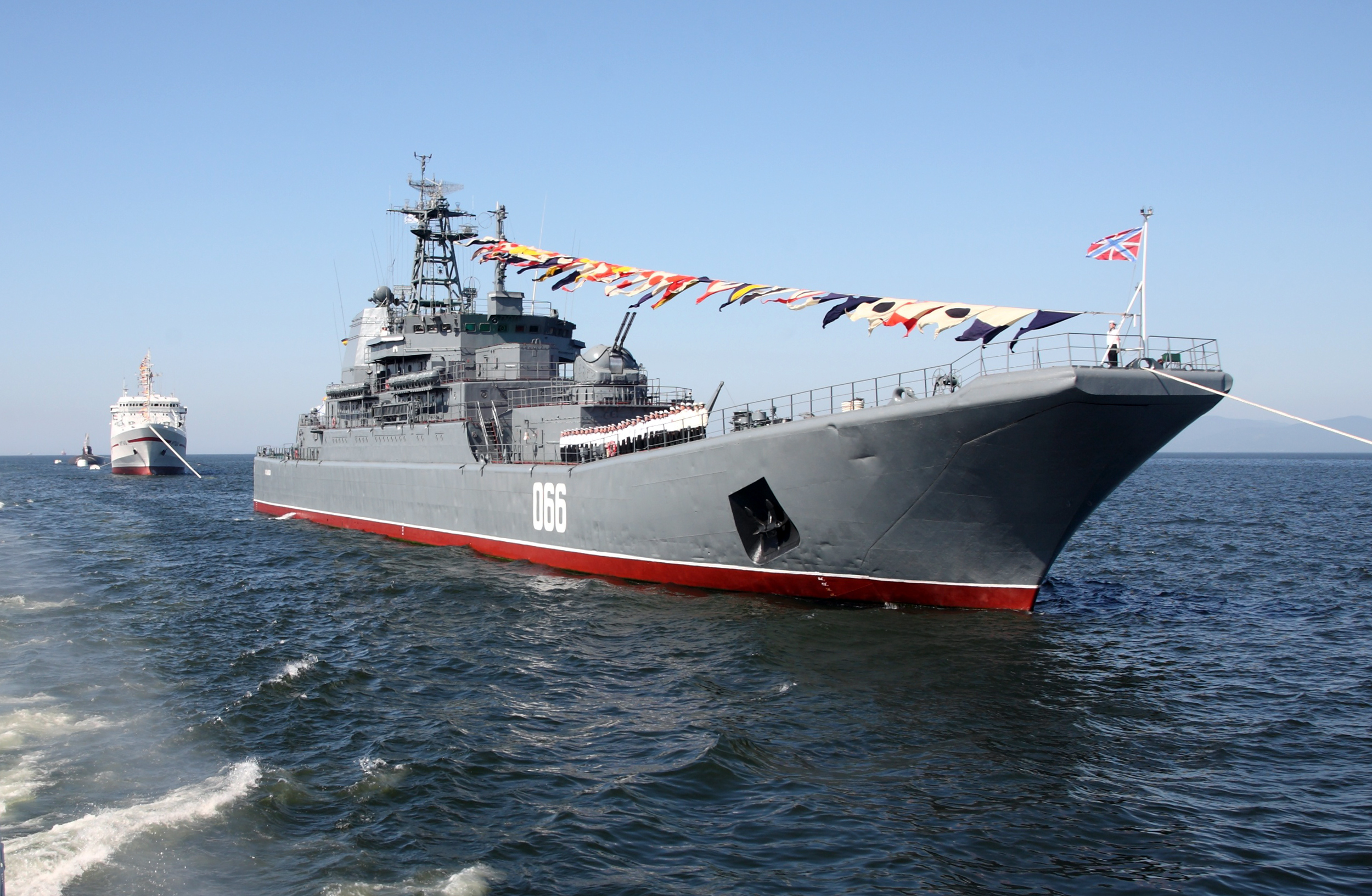

History

Russia
- Name: BDK-101 (1981-2006); Oslyabya (2006-present)
- Namesake: Rodion Oslyabya
- Builder: Stocznia Północna, Gdańsk, Poland
- Launched: 1981
- Commissioned: 19 December 1981
- Home port: Fokino, Primorsky Krai
- Identification: Hull number: 086 (1981-1985); 090 (1985-1990); 081 (1990-1991); 069 (1991-1994); 066 (1994-present)
- Status: In service

General characteristics
- Class & type: Ropucha-class landing ship
- Displacement: 3,450 t (3,396 long tons) standard; 4,080 t (4,016 long tons) full load
- Length: 112.5 m (369 ft 1 in)
- Beam: 15.01 m (49 ft 3 in)
- Draught: 4.26 m (14 ft 0 in)
- Ramps: Over bows and at stern
- Installed power: 3 × 750 kW (1,006 hp) diesel generators
- Propulsion: 2 × 9,600 hp (7,159 kW) Zgoda-Sulzer 16ZVB40/48 diesel engines
- Speed: 18 knots (33 km/h; 21 mph)
- Range: 6,000 nmi (11,000 km; 6,900 mi) at 12 knots (22 km/h; 14 mph); 3,500 nmi (6,500 km; 4,000 mi) at 16 knots (30 km/h; 18 mph)
- Endurance: 30 days
- Capacity: 10 × main battle tanks and 340 troops or 12 × BTR APC and 340 troops or 3 × main battle tanks, 3 × 2S9 Nona-S SPG, 5 × MT-LB APC, 4 trucks and 313 troops or 500 tons of cargo
- Complement: 98
- Armament: 2 × AK-725 twin 57 mm (2.2 in) DP guns; 4 × 8 Strela 2 SAM launchers; 2 × 22 A-215 Grad-M rocket launchers

Oslyabya (Russian: Ослябя) is a Ropucha-class landing ship of the Russian Navy and part of the Pacific Fleet.

Named after the semi-legendary monk and hero of the Battle of Kulikovo Rodion Oslyabya, the ship was built in Poland and launched in 1981. She was named BDK-101 (Russian: БДК-101) for Russian: Большой десантный корабль, romanized: Bolshoy desantnyi korabl', lit. 'large landing ship', from her construction until being renamed Oslyabya in 2006. She is one of the subtype of the Ropucha-class landing ships, designated Project 775/II by the Russian Navy.

== Construction and commissioning ==
Oslyabya was built as BDK-101 by Stocznia Północna, part of Gdańsk Shipyard, in Gdańsk, in what was then the Polish People's Republic. She was launched in 1981 and commissioned into the Soviet Navy on 19 December 1981 as part of its Pacific Fleet. She was homeported in Fokino, Primorsky Krai, and with the dissolution of the Soviet Union in late December 1991, she went on to serve in the Russian Navy.

== Career ==
In service since 1981 as BDK-101, she was renamed Oslyabya on 24 January 2006. She made several voyages to the Indian Ocean during her career with the Soviet Navy, being deployed there in 1985 and 1986, and evacuating Soviet citizens from Aden during the South Yemen civil war in 1986. She performed a similar role in 1991, when she evacuated Soviet citizens from Nakura, during the final stages of the Eritrean War of Independence. During the late 1990s she operated in Pacific waters, delivering cargo to the Kamchatka Peninsula in 1996, 1997, and 1999. In 1999, she transported military units being withdrawn from the Chukchi Peninsula. In November 2000, there were complaints of bullying and hazing made by BDK-101's sailors against warrant officers and contract petty officers, resulting in the opening of a criminal case.

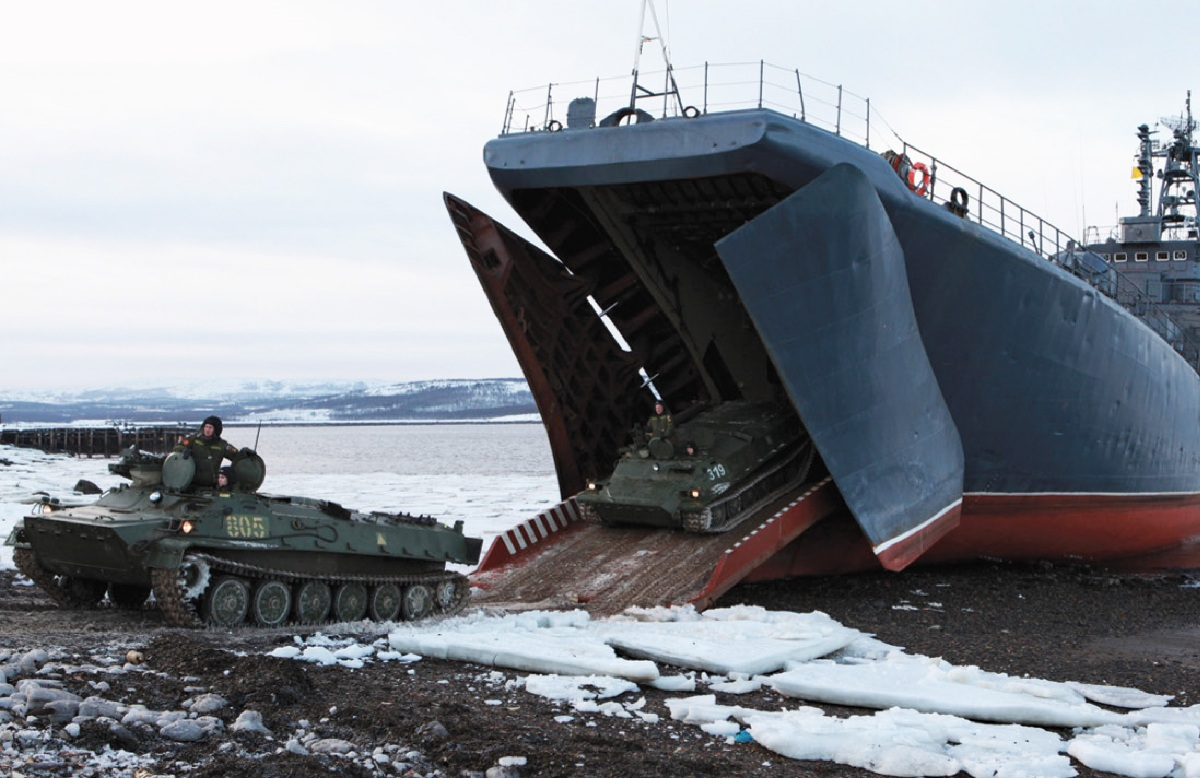
Oslyabya landing armoured vehicles during exercises in 2016

Oslyabya spent spring 2013 with a detachment of the Pacific Fleet, voyaging into the Indian Ocean. She returned to Pacific waters by June, when she carried out a voyage from Vladivostok to Sakhalin, visiting places connected with past exploits of Soviet and Russian forces. She returned to Vladivostok on 8 October, having visited Olga, Preobrazheniye, Nakhodka, and Slavyanka, and having been visted by more than 2,000 people. She was several times ranked as the best ship of her class in the fleet, and in December 2014, began a refit at the Dalzavod Ship Repair Centre. The refit was completed by March 2017, and she rejoined the fleet. In July that year she visited for Korsakov for exercises and commemorative ceremonies, and September that year she transported the second joint expedition of the Ministry of Defence and the Russian Geographical Society from Matua. A summary of her service by July 2019 noted that she had carried out 15 combat missions, transported more than 35 thousand troops, and travelled more than 112 thousand miles.

In March 2020, she conducted exercises in the Sea of Japan. In October 2024, she conducted exercises off the Kuril Islands. She was active again in 2026.
