= Russian submarine Tomsk =

Oscar-class submarine of the Russian Navy

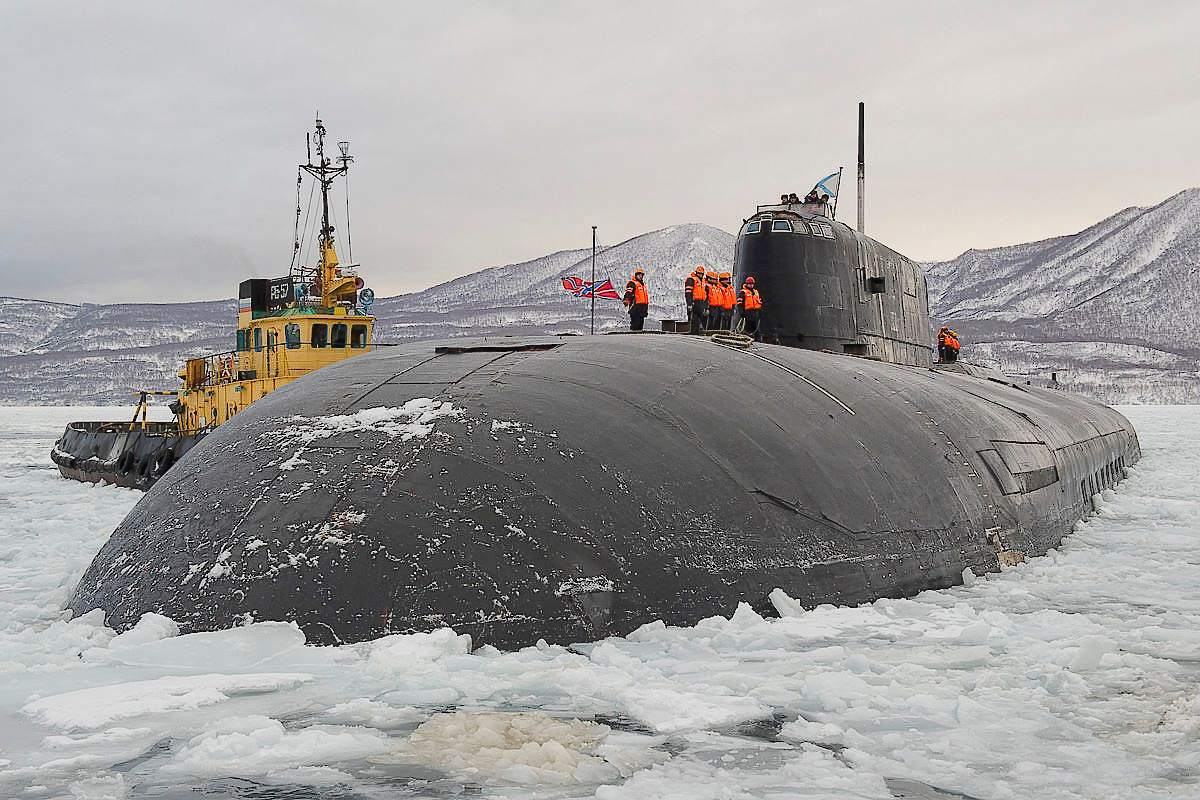
- Tomsk

History

Russia
- Name: K-150
- Builder: Sevmash, Severodvinsk
- Laid down: 27 August 1991
- Launched: 20 July 1996
- Commissioned: 30 December 1996
- Renamed: Tomsk; (Томск)
- Namesake: Tomsk
- Home port: Vilyuchinsk
- Identification: See Pennant numbers
- Status: Active

General characteristics
- Class & type: Oscar II-class submarine
- Displacement: 12,300–14,500 long tons (12,500–14,700 t) surfaced; 16,200–19,100 long tons (16,500–19,400 t) submerged
- Length: 155 m (508 ft 6 in) maximum
- Beam: 18.2 m (59 ft 9 in)
- Draught: 9 m (29 ft 6 in)
- Installed power: 2 × pressurized water cooled reactors (HEU <= 45%)
- Propulsion: 2 × steam turbines delivering 73,070 kW (97,990 shp) to two shafts
- Speed: 15 knots (28 km/h; 17 mph) surfaced; 32 knots (59 km/h; 37 mph) submerged
- Endurance: 120 days
- Test depth: 600 m
- Complement: 94/107
- Armament: 4 × 533 mm (21.0 in) and 2 × 650 mm (26 in) torpedo tubes in bow; 28 × 533 mm and 650 mm weapons, including RPK-2 Vyuga (SS-N-15 Starfish) anti-submarine missiles with 15 kt nuclear warheads and RPK-6 Vodopad/RPK-7 Veter (SS-N-16) anti-submarine missiles with 200 kt nuclear warhead or Type 40 anti-submarine torpedo or 32 ground mines; 24 × P-700 Granit (SS-N-19 Shipwreck) cruise missiles with 750 kilograms (1,650 lb) HE or 4 × 100 Mt Poseidon drones

The K-150 Tomsk is an Oscar-class submarine in the Russian Navy.

== Development and design ==
The design assignment was issued in 1969. The development of Project 949 was a new stage in the development of APRC-class submarines, which, in accordance with the concept of asymmetric response, were tasked with countering aircraft carrier strike formations. The new missile submarines were to replace the submarines of Projects 659 and 675 and in accordance with the terms of reference surpassed them in all basic parameters - could launch missiles from both surface and underwater position, had less noise, higher underwater speed, three times higher ammunition, missiles with radically improved combat capabilities. Project 949 became the pinnacle and the end of the development of highly specialized submarines (aircraft carrier killers).

In December 2011, they became known that the Rubin Central Design Bureau had developed a modernization project. It is planned to replace the P-700 missiles with the more modern P-800 Oniks missiles from the Caliber family. Modification of launch containers is planned, without alteration of the hull. The modernization of the nuclear submarine of the Northern Fleet will be carried out at the Zvezdochka CS, and the Zvezda shipyard.

The design is double-hulled, with a distance between a light and durable body of 3.5 meters, which provides a significant buoyancy margin, up to 30%, and provides additional protection against underwater explosions. For their characteristic appearance, they received the nickname baton, and for their powerful strike weapons they were nicknamed aircraft carrier killers. The robust housing is divided into ten internal compartments.

== Construction and career ==
The submarine was laid down on 27 August 1991 at Sevmash, Severodvinsk. Launched on 20 July 1996 and commissioned on 30 December 1996.

On 9 October 1998, he became part of the 10th Submarine Division of the Pacific Fleet, based at Vilyuchinsk (Rybachy village, Krasheninnikov Bay), Kamchatka Territory.

Summer-autumn 1999, joint performance of BS missions with K-141 Kursk in the Mediterranean Sea. K-150 Tomsk was under the control of the crew of K-186 Omsk (commander - Captain 1st Rank VV Dmitriev, senior on board - Division Commander Rear Admiral NG Kovalevsky). Despite the fact that the US Navy's 3rd Fleet allocated significant forces to search and detect Russian SSGNs, the crew successfully completed all the assigned tasks. Upon completion of the BS, General of the Army A.V. Kvashnin awarded each crew member with a personal watch.

In 2001, two prizes were won by the Civil Code of the Russian Navy.

From September to December 2003, the execution of combat duty.

In 2003, he won the prize of the Civil Code of the Russian Navy.

In 2004, the fulfillment of the BS tasks, according to the results of the year, the crew won two prizes of the Civil Code of the Russian Navy.

In 2006 he won the prize of the Civil Code of the Russian Navy.

In 2007, two more prizes of the Civil Code of the Russian Navy were won.

In November 2008, the submarine arrived in the city of Bolshoy Kamen at the Zvezda shipyard to restore technical readiness.

In 2010, it was moved to the quay wall of the plant due to a breakdown of the cooling unit at one of the reactors. At the time of the repair, the readiness of the SSGN was ensured by the 621 crew.

On the morning of 16 September 2013, a fire broke out during the installation of the main ballast tank. As a result of the ignition of the interhull heat and sound insulation material in the space between the light and durable hull, the submarine partially lost its functional characteristics. 15 servicemen were injured, all of them were sent for treatment to the naval clinical hospital.

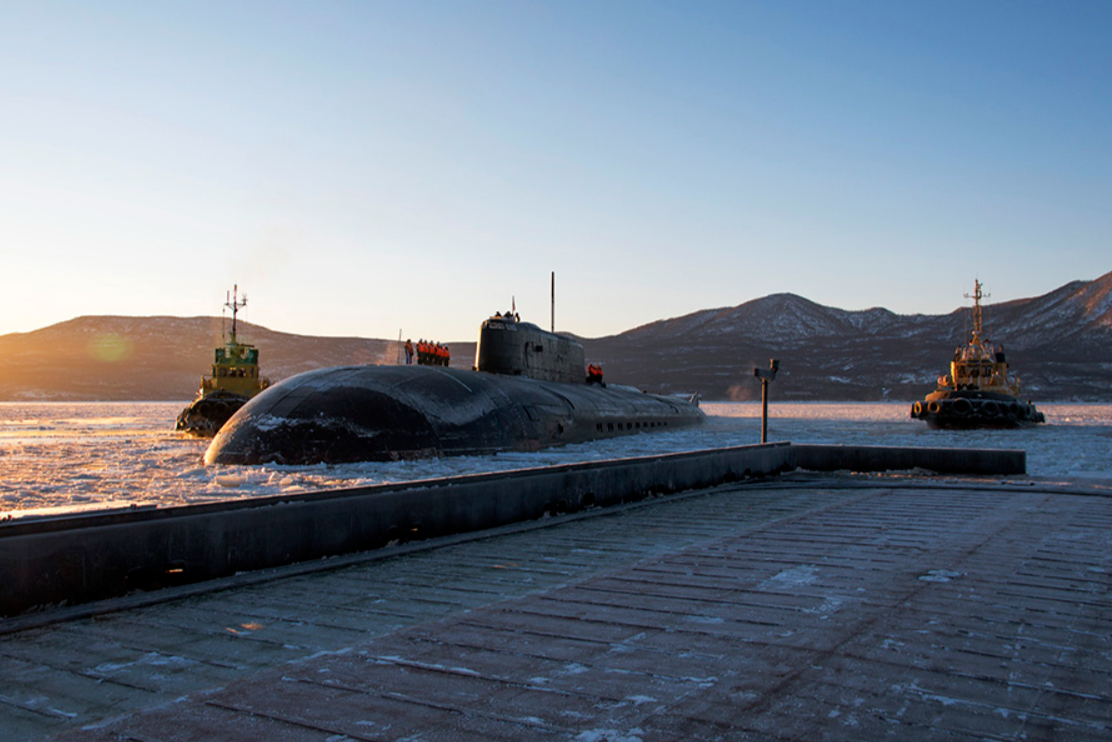
Tomsk in December 2015

On 12 June 2014, the boat was launched after repairs, and in December went to the place of permanent basing in Kamchatka. on 25 December, after repairs again included in the combat composition of the Pacific Fleet.

On 26 October 2015, a delegation from Tomsk visited the sponsored nuclear submarine in Vilyuchinsk based on the submarine forces of the Pacific Fleet. By the end of December 2015, after successfully completing combat training missions, the K-150 Tomsk submarine under the command of Captain 1st Rank Roman Velichenko returned to the permanent base in Kamchatka. The chief of staff of the submarine forces of the KTOF Rear Admiral Sergei Rekish presented the crew with the Challenge Cup of the Commander-in-Chief of the Russian Navy for the first place in the competition between multipurpose submarines to destroy imaginary enemy ships with combat firing with cruise missiles.

In 2016, the submarine took first place in the results of firing to destroy the ships of a mock enemy with cruise missiles between multipurpose submarines. Also, at the end of the year, the Tomsk crew was awarded the Challenge Cup of the Pacific Fleet Commander for tactical training and the Challenge Cup of the Union of Pacific Fleet Submariners for high professional training and combat training.

On 12 July 2017, the submarine from a submerged position in the Sea of Okhotsk successfully launched a supersonic cruise missile Granit at a training coastal target at the Kura training ground in the Kamchatka Territory. On 9 October 2017, during a joint command and staff training with the flagship of the Pacific Fleet Guards missile cruiser Varyag to hit a target vessel from the Sea of Okhotsk at maximum range, successfully fired a Granit cruise missile at a given surface target from a submerged position. According to the results of the 2017 championship for the challenge prize of the Commander-in-Chief of the Navy, the K-150 Tomsk crew was declared the best in striking a sea target with cruise missiles.

For September 2020, the K-150 Tomsk was part of the 10th Submarine Division of the 16th Red Banner Submarine Squadron based at Vilyuchinsk, Krasheninnikov Bay (Kamchatka naval base).

On 15 July 2022, Tomsk (along with Omsk and Kuzbass) returned from three month deployment.

On 15 December, she started repairs at Dalzavod.

On 19 April 2023, she fired a salvo of 22 P-700 anti-ship cruise missiles.

=== Pennant numbers ===
Date	Pennant number
2000	902
2008	932
