= Russian submarine Irkutsk =

Oscar-class submarine of the Russian Navy

- Oscar II-class submarine

History

Russia
- Name: K-132
- Builder: Sevmash, Severodvinsk
- Laid down: 8 May 1985
- Launched: 27 December 1987
- Commissioned: 30 December 1988
- Renamed: Irkutsk; (Иркутск)
- Namesake: Irkutsk
- Identification: See Pennant numbers
- Status: Reported decommissioned

General characteristics
- Class & type: Oscar II-class submarine
- Displacement: 12,300–14,500 long tons (12,500–14,700 t) surfaced; 16,200–19,100 long tons (16,500–19,400 t) submerged
- Length: 155 m (508 ft 6 in) maximum
- Beam: 18.2 m (59 ft 9 in)
- Draught: 9 m (29 ft 6 in)
- Installed power: 2 × pressurized water cooled reactors (HEU <= 45%)
- Propulsion: 2 × steam turbines delivering 73,070 kW (97,990 shp) to two shafts
- Speed: 15 knots (28 km/h; 17 mph) surfaced; 32 knots (59 km/h; 37 mph) submerged
- Endurance: 120 days
- Test depth: 600 m
- Complement: 94/107
- Armament: 4 × 533 mm (21.0 in) and 2 × 650 mm (26 in) torpedo tubes in bow; 28 × 533 mm and 650 mm weapons, including RPK-2 Vyuga (SS-N-15 Starfish) anti-submarine missiles with 15 kt nuclear warheads and RPK-6 Vodopad/RPK-7 Veter (SS-N-16) anti-submarine missiles with 200 kt nuclear warhead or Type 40 anti-submarine torpedo or 32 ground mines; 24 × P-700 Granit (SS-N-19 Shipwreck) cruise missiles with 750 kilograms (1,650 lb) HE or 4 × 100 Mt Poseidon drones

K-132 Irkutsk was an Oscar-class submarine in the Russian Navy.

== Development and design ==
The design assignment was issued in 1969. The development of Project 949 was a new stage in the development of APRC-class submarines, which, in accordance with the concept of asymmetric response, were tasked with countering aircraft carrier strike formations. The new missile submarines were to replace the submarines of Projects 659 and 675 and in accordance with the terms of reference surpassed them in all basic parameters - could launch missiles from both surface and underwater position, had less noise, higher underwater speed, three times higher ammunition, missiles with radically improved combat capabilities. Project 949 became the pinnacle and the end of the development of highly specialized submarines (aircraft carrier killers). In December 2011, they became known that the Rubin Central Design Bureau had developed a modernization project. It is planned to replace the P-700 missiles with the more modern P-800 Oniks missiles from the Caliber family. Modification of launch containers is planned, without alteration of the hull. The modernization of the nuclear submarine of the Northern Fleet will be carried out at the Zvezdochka CS, and the Zvezda shipyard.

The design is double-hulled, with a distance between a light and durable body of 3.5 meters, which provides a significant buoyancy margin, up to 30%, and provides additional protection against underwater explosions. For their characteristic appearance, they received the nickname baton, and for their powerful strike weapons they were nicknamed aircraft carrier killers. The robust housing is divided into ten internal compartments.

== Construction and career ==
The submarine was laid down on 8 May 1985 at Sevmash, Severodvinsk. Launched on 27 December 1987 and commissioned on 30 December 1988. On 13 April 1993, she was renamed Irkutsk.

On 21 July 1990, K-132 near Bear Island dived to a depth of 460 metres (1,510 ft) meters. From 30 August to 27 September of the same year, she made an ice crossing through the Arctic from Zaozersk to Vilyuchinsk. On 29 October she entered the Pacific Fleet.

In 1992, for the first time in the Pacific Fleet, she fired two P-700 Granit missiles.

On 23 May 1996, Irkutsk and K-456 fired group cruise missiles at one target. In 1997, Irkutsk was put on stand-by, awaiting mid-life repairs.

In November 2001, Irkutsk was brought to Bolshoi Kamen at the Zvezda shipyard.

In 2008, repairs began, and at first it was planned to carry out medium repairs, then the customer corrected the terms of reference for the restoration of technical readiness with a corresponding decrease in funding. According to the director of the Zvezda shipyard, Andrei Rassomakhin, in an interview dated 29 August 2008: about 6 billion rubles are required for repairs, while the cost of a new ship is 40-50 billion, and the funding provided for in the state contract should be considered insufficient.

On 7 December 2013, the Zvezda Far East Plant announced the start of modernization of K-132 Irkutsk. The modernization project was prepared by the Rubin St. Petersburg Marine Engineering Design Bureau. In November 2013, the Zvezda plant commission approved the project by signing an agreement with Rubin. According to the documentation, 12 billion rubles were expected to be spent on all work. A total of 27 Rubin's contractors took part in the project. Among them: JSC Concern Morinformsistema-Agat, JSC Concern NPO Avrora, FSUE Central Research Institute of Structural Materials Prometey and JSC Central Design Bureau Lazurit. Under the modernization program, strike weapons, navigation equipment and other systems will be updated, as well as the hull of the boat will be strengthened.

K-132 Irkutsk, which was being modernized at the Far Eastern Zvezda plant, returned to the Pacific Fleet in 2019, Interfax-AVN reported, citing a source in the shipbuilding industry. Irkutsk was being modernized at the Zvezda shipyard according to the Project 949AM. The ship was able to return to service two years later than planned. In reality, the start of the repair of Irkutsk was announced in the press service of the enterprise only on 30 July 2019. In a planned manner, work was underway to troubleshoot and repair ship fittings, general ship devices, steering drives. The deadline for the delivery of the nuclear submarine is set for 2022.

During his working trip, Deputy Defense Minister Alexei Krivoruchko visited the enterprises of the military–industrial complex of the Far East. The main goal is to verify the fulfillment by enterprises of the state defense order of 2019. Summing up the visit to the Far Eastern shipbuilding cluster, Krivoruchko told reporters that Irkutsk, which was being upgraded at the Zvezda shipyard to the Project 949AM level, would be equipped with a universal launch complex that will allow the use of Zircon hypersonic missiles. The service life of the vessel will, reportedly, be extended by ten years. The submarine is scheduled to be handed over to the Pacific Fleet in 2023.

On 23 June 2022, it was reported the submarine started post-refit sea trials. Modernised Irkutsk will carry 48 missiles. However, the reports of her return to service may have been false and, in 2025, she was reported to have decommissioned.

=== Pennant numbers ===
Date	Pennant number
1990	601
2000	929
