= Krasnodar (disambiguation) =

Krasnodar is a city in Russia.

Krasnodar may also refer to:

- Krasnodar Krai, a federal subject of Russia
- Krasnodar Urban Okrug, a municipal formation which the City of Krasnodar in Krasnodar Krai, Russia is incorporated as
- Krasnodar International Airport, an airport in Krasnodar, Russia
- Krasnodar (K-148), a retired Russian Oscar-class submarine
- Krasnodar (B-265), a Russian Kilo-class submarine
- MV Krasnodar, several motor vessels
- FC Krasnodar, a football club from Russia
- SKIF Krasnodar, a handball club from Russia
- Krasnodar Rora (b. 1945), former Croatian soccer player

== See also ==
- Krasnodarsky (disambiguation)
- FC Kuban Krasnodar, a football club from Russia
- FC Krasnodar-2, a football club from Krasnodar, Russia
- FC Krasnodar-2000, a defunct football club from Russia
