= Russian submarine Murmansk =

- Oscar I class submarine

History

Soviet Union, Russia
- Name: K-206 Minskiy Komsomolets from 14 April 1987; K-206 Murmansk from 6 April 1993.
- Namesake: Russian port of Murmansk
- Builder: Sevmash
- Laid down: 22 April 1979
- Launched: 10 December 1982
- Commissioned: 30 November 1983
- Decommissioned: 1996 (in reserve in 1994)
- Fate: Scrapped January 2004. Scrapping completed 2006.

General characteristics
- Class & type: Oscar-class submarine
- Displacement: 12,500 tons surfaced; 15,500-22,500 tons submerged
- Length: 143 m (469 ft 2 in)
- Beam: 18.2 m (59 ft 9 in) (20.1 m (65 ft 11 in) with stabilisers)
- Draught: 9 m (29 ft 6 in)
- Propulsion: 2 × pressurized water cooled reactors (HEU <= 45%) powering two steam turbines delivering 73,070 kW (98,000 shp) to two shafts
- Speed: 16 knots (30 km/h; 18 mph) surfaced; 32 knots (59 km/h; 37 mph) submerged
- Endurance: 50 days, or 120 days
- Test depth: 500 m (1,600 ft) operational, 830 m (2,720 ft) max
- Complement: 94
- Armament: 4 × 533 mm (21.0 in) and 2 × 650 mm (26 in) torpedo tubes in bow; 28 × 533 mm and 650 mm weapons, including Tsakra (SS-N-15 Starfish) anti-submarine missiles with 15 kt nuclear warheads and Vodopad/Veder (SS-N-16 Stallion) and anti-submarine missiles with 200 kt nuclear warhead or Type 40 anti-submarine torpedo or 32 ground mines; 24 × P-700 Granit (SS-N-19 Shipwreck) cruise missiles with 750 kilograms (1,650 lb) HE or 500 kt nuclear warheads

K-206 Murmansk was a nuclear-powered Oscar-class submarine of the Soviet Navy, and later the Russian Navy. She was the second of the two Oscar I (the Soviet classification was Project 949 Granit) vessels constructed, the other being K-525. A further 11 submarines of an improved class, Project 949A (Antey) (called Oscar II by NATO), were subsequently constructed.

The vessel was placed in reserve in 1994, and decommissioned in 1996. Scrapping of the boats at Sevmash started in January 2004, funded by the British Government under the Cooperative Threat Reduction program. They had been reduced to a three-compartment unit (of the original ten watertight compartments) by 2006.
