= Russian submarine Chelyabinsk =

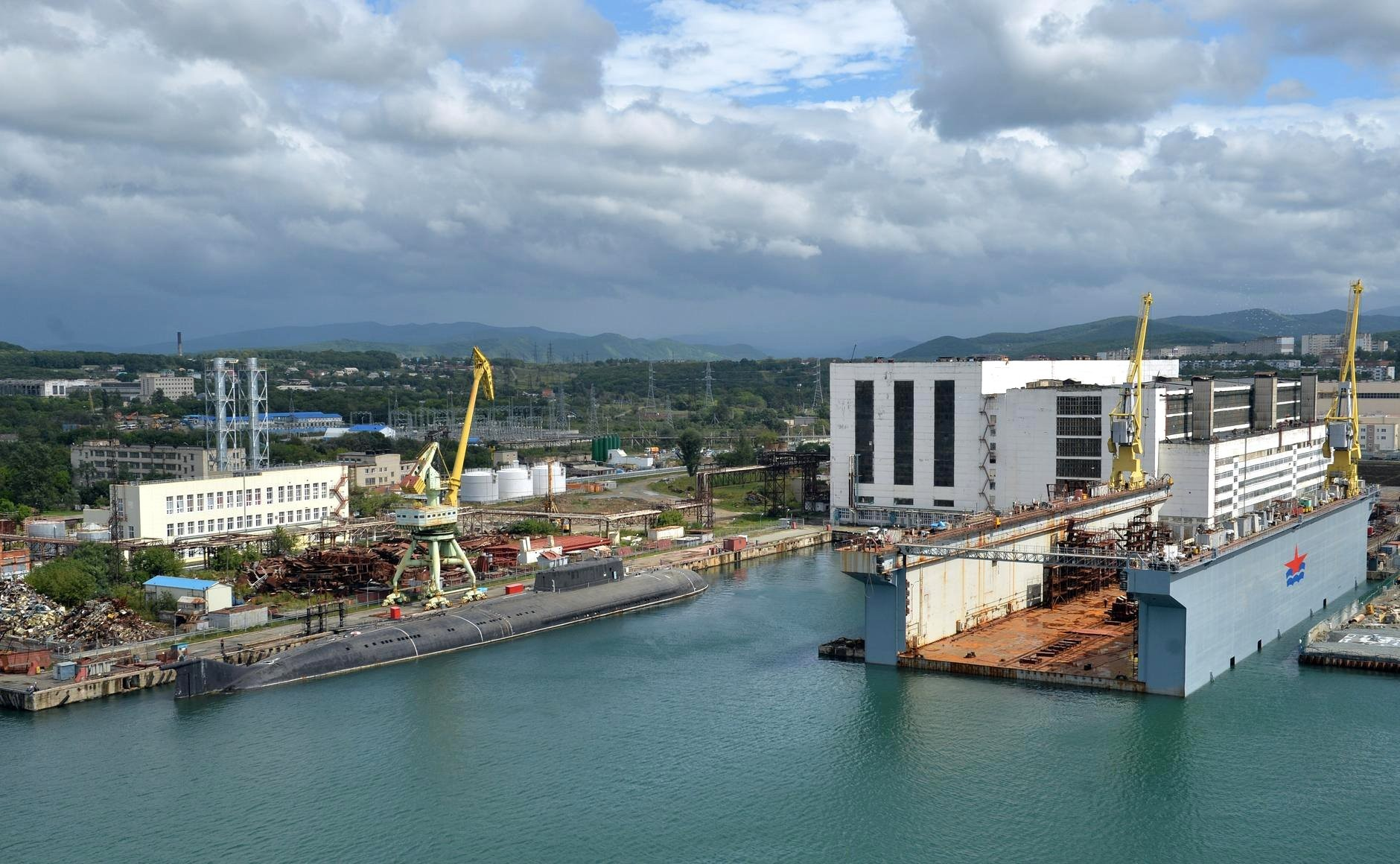
- K-442 in Bolshoy Kamen, 2016

History

Soviet Union, Russia
- Name: K-442 Chelyabinsk
- Namesake: Named after the Russian city Chelyabinsk
- Yard number: 638
- Laid down: 21 May 1987
- Launched: 18 June 1990
- Completed: 28 December 1990
- Commissioned: 28 December 1990
- Home port: Rybachiy Nuclear Submarine Base
- Status: In modernization

General characteristics
- Class & type: Oscar II class Submarine
- Displacement: 13.400 t, 16.400 t
- Length: 154 m (505 ft 3 in)
- Beam: 18.2 m (59 ft 9 in)
- Draft: 9 m (29 ft 6 in)
- Propulsion: 2 nuclear reactors OK-650b (HEU <= 45%), 2 steam turbines, 2/7-bladed props
- Speed: 32 knots (59 km/h; 37 mph) submerged, 16 knots (30 km/h; 18 mph) surfaced
- Test depth: 300 to 1,000 m (980 to 3,280 ft) (by various estimates)
- Complement: 44 officers, 68 enlisted
- Armament: 24 × SS-N-19/P-700 Granit; 4 × 533 mm and 2 x 650 mm bow torpedo tubes

The K-442 Chelyabinsk is an Oscar II Class (Project 949A) SSGN of the Russian Navy.

== History ==
K-442 was laid on May 21, 1987 at Severodvinsk before being listed by the Soviet Navy on February 20, 1989. In June 1990, it was launched before being commissioned on December 28, 1990. On August 18, 1991, K-442 along with another Oscar II Class SSGN, K-173, left Zapadnaya Litsa Bay to sail underneath the North Pole to transition from the Northern Fleet to the Pacific Fleet. They arrived on September 12, 1991 at Krasheninnikov Bay in Vilyuchinsk and officially was assigned to the Pacific Fleet on September 24.

K-442 did not receive the name 'Chelyabinsk' until April 13, 1993. During 1994, the K-442 took part in an operational tour in the Pacific. This included it tracking the USS Kitty Hawk (CV-63) Battlegroup. During the tracking of the Kitty Hawk CVBG, the US conducted ASW operations against it between July 7–8, 1994. The voyage also including tracking the USS Independence (CV-62), which was based in Yokosuka, Japan.

In May 1999, the K-442 was laid up due to wear and tear before returning to service around 2002. In 2008, The sub was laid up again awaiting repair.

Since 2014 the submarine is located at the Zvezda shipyard, Bolshoy Kamen

== Outfitting ==
- Electronics Fit:
  - Radar: Tobol surface search
  - Sonar: MGK-540, Skat 3
  - Other: Medveditsa 949M navigation, Tsunami space communications
