= Russian submarine Smolensk =

Oscar-class submarine of the Russian Navy

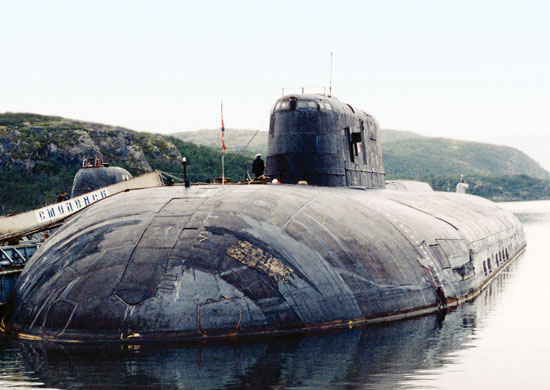
- Smolensk

History

Russia
- Name: K-410
- Builder: Sevmash, Severodvinsk
- Laid down: 9 December 1986
- Launched: 20 January 1990
- Commissioned: 22 December 1990
- Renamed: Smolensk; (Смоленск)
- Namesake: Smolensk
- Identification: Pennant number: 816
- Status: Active

General characteristics
- Class & type: Oscar II-class submarine
- Displacement: 12,300–14,500 long tons (12,500–14,700 t) surfaced; 16,200–19,100 long tons (16,500–19,400 t) submerged
- Length: 155 m (508 ft 6 in) maximum
- Beam: 18.2 m (59 ft 9 in)
- Draught: 9 m (29 ft 6 in)
- Installed power: 2 × pressurized water cooled reactors (HEU <= 45%)
- Propulsion: 2 × steam turbines delivering 73,070 kW (97,990 shp) to two shafts
- Speed: 15 knots (28 km/h; 17 mph) surfaced; 32 knots (59 km/h; 37 mph) submerged
- Endurance: 120 days
- Test depth: 600 m
- Complement: 94/107
- Armament: 4 × 533 mm (21.0 in) and 2 × 650 mm (26 in) torpedo tubes in bow; 28 × 533 mm and 650 mm weapons, including RPK-2 Vyuga (SS-N-15 Starfish) anti-submarine missiles with 15 kt nuclear warheads and RPK-6 Vodopad/RPK-7 Veter (SS-N-16) anti-submarine missiles with 200 kt nuclear warhead or Type 40 anti-submarine torpedo or 32 ground mines; 24 × P-700 Granit (SS-N-19 Shipwreck) cruise missiles with 750 kilograms (1,650 lb) HE or 4 × 100 Mt Poseidon drones

K-410 Smolensk is an Oscar-class submarine in the Russian Navy.

== Development and design ==
The design assignment was issued in 1969. The development of Project 949 was a new stage in the development of APRC-class submarines, which, in accordance with the concept of asymmetric response, were tasked with countering aircraft carrier strike formations. The new missile submarines were to replace the submarines of Projects 659 and 675 and in accordance with the terms of reference surpassed them in all basic parameters - could launch missiles from both surface and underwater position, had less noise, higher underwater speed, three times higher ammunition, missiles with radically improved combat capabilities. Project 949 became the pinnacle and the end of the development of highly specialized submarines (aircraft carrier killers).

In December 2011, they became known that the Rubin Central Design Bureau had developed a modernization project. It is planned to replace the P-700 missiles with the more modern P-800 Oniks missiles from the Caliber family. Modification of launch containers is planned, without alteration of the hull. The modernization of the nuclear submarine of the Northern Fleet will be carried out at the Zvezdochka CS, and the Zvezda shipyard.

The design is double-hulled, with a distance between a light and durable body of 3.5 meters, which provides a significant buoyancy margin, up to 30 %, and provides additional protection against underwater explosions. For their characteristic appearance, they received the nickname baton, and for their powerful strike weapons they were nicknamed aircraft carrier killers. The robust housing is divided into ten internal compartments.

== Construction and career ==
The submarine was laid down on 9 December 1986 at Sevmash, Severodvinsk. The vessel was launched on 20 January 1990 and commissioned on 22 December 1990.

In 1995, Smolensk performed an autonomous military service to the shores of Cuba. During autonomy, in the Sargasso Sea area, an accident occurred at the main power plant, the consequences were eliminated by the crew without losing secrecy and using security measures in two days. During the elimination of the malfunction, the turbinists of the 8th compartment especially distinguished themselves by sailors O. Kondratyev, R. Salimov, V. Rybalov, under the command of Lieutenant Commander V. N. Pavlyuk. All the assigned tasks of the combat service were completed successfully.

In 1996, she began her autonomous combat service.

Smolensk was awarded the Commander-in-Chief of the Navy Prize for successful missile firing in 1993, 1994, 1998.

As of 2008, the K-410 Smolensk was in the combat composition of the Northern Fleet of the Russian Navy, based at Zaozersk, Zapadnaya Litsa.

In 2011, the submarine was delivered for repairs to the Zvezdochka Shipbuilding Center. In August 2012, the building berth stage of repairs was completed at the Smolensk APRK: on August 5, 2012, a dock operation was carried out to launch the ship. The final stage of work was carried out afloat at the outfitting embankment.

On 2 September 2013, the boat was at the dock of the Zvezdochka shipyard, when, during the tests of the main ballast tank of the nuclear submarine, the pressure tore off the Kingston pressure cap. There were no casualties or injuries. On 23 December 2013, after the completed repairs, Smolensk went to sea to carry out a program of factory sea trials. During the repair on the cruiser, the technical readiness of all the ship's systems was restored, including the mechanical part, electronic weapons, hull structures and the main power plant. The submarine's reactors were recharged and the weapons complex was repaired. The service life of the submarine missile carrier was extended by 3.5 years, after which it is planned to begin work on a deep modernization of the ship. It was planned that by the end of 2013 the crew of the cruiser and the factory commissioning team would check all the systems of the ship in the conditions of the test sites in the White Sea. After that, the submarine was sent to his permanent base on the Kola Peninsula.

In September 2014, the submarine took part in tactical exercises of the diverse forces of the Northern Fleet.

On 16 October 2016, the submarine launched a Granit missile from a submerged position in the Barents Sea at a target on the Novaya Zemlya archipelago in the Arctic, as part of the final combat training activities for the 2016 academic year. The shooting was successful, the rocket hit the target, which was located in the depths of the coast of the Northern island of the Novaya Zemlya archipelago.

On 5 July 2017, the submarine from a submerged position destroyed a sea target in the water area of the Barents Sea, located at a distance of about 400 kilometres (250 mi) with a Granit cruise missile.

In July 2019, the submarine took part in the celebration of the Navy Day on the roadstead of Kronstadt.

In June 2022, the submarine took part in exercises in which she engaged in the practice firing of Kalibr and Granit cruise missiles.
