= Russian ship Arkhangelsk =

Several Imperial Russian, Soviet or Russian navy ships are named after Arkhangelsk;

- Soviet battleship Arkhangelsk, formerly HMS Royal Sovereign, transferred to the Soviet Navy in 1944 and returned to the United Kingdom in 1949
- Russian submarine Arkhangelsk (K-525), an Oscar-class nuclear-powered submarine of the Soviet and Russian Navy in service from 1981 to 1993
- Russian submarine Arkhangelsk (TK-17), a Typhoon-class nuclear-powered submarine of the Soviet and Russian Navy in service from 1987 to 2004
- Russian submarine Arkhangelsk (K-564), a Yasen-class nuclear-powered submarine of the Russian Navy in service since 2024
