= Russian submarine Voronezh =

Oscar-class submarine of the Russian Navy

History

Russia
- Name: K-119
- Builder: Sevmash, Severodvinsk
- Laid down: 25 February 1986
- Launched: 16 December 1988
- Commissioned: 29 December 1989
- Renamed: Voronezh; (Воронеж)
- Namesake: Voronezh
- Decommissioned: 2020
- Home port: Severomorsk
- Identification: See Pennant numbers
- Status: Inactive

General characteristics
- Class & type: Oscar II-class submarine
- Displacement: 12,300–14,500 long tons (12,500–14,700 t) surfaced; 16,200–19,100 long tons (16,500–19,400 t) submerged
- Length: 155 m (508 ft 6 in) maximum
- Beam: 18.2 m (59 ft 9 in)
- Draught: 9 m (29 ft 6 in)
- Installed power: 2 × pressurized water cooled reactors (HEU <= 45%)
- Propulsion: 2 × steam turbines delivering 73,070 kW (97,990 shp) to two shafts
- Speed: 15 knots (28 km/h; 17 mph) surfaced; 32 knots (59 km/h; 37 mph) submerged
- Endurance: 120 days
- Test depth: 600 m
- Complement: 94/107
- Armament: 4 × 533 mm (21.0 in) and 2 × 650 mm (26 in) torpedo tubes in bow; 28 × 533 mm and 650 mm weapons, including RPK-2 Vyuga (SS-N-15 Starfish) anti-submarine missiles with 15 kt nuclear warheads and RPK-6 Vodopad/RPK-7 Veter (SS-N-16) anti-submarine missiles with 200 kt nuclear warhead or Type 40 anti-submarine torpedo or 32 ground mines; 24 × P-700 Granit (SS-N-19 Shipwreck) cruise missiles with 750 kilograms (1,650 lb) HE or 4 × 100 Mt Poseidon drones

K-119 Voronezh is an Oscar-class submarine in the Russian Navy.

== Development and design ==
The design assignment was issued in 1969. The development of Project 949 was a new stage in the development of APRC-class submarines, which, in accordance with the concept of asymmetric response, were tasked with countering aircraft carrier strike formations. The new missile submarines were to replace the submarines of Projects 659 and 675 and in accordance with the terms of reference surpassed them in all basic parameters - could launch missiles from both surface and underwater position, had less noise, higher underwater speed, three times higher ammunition, missiles with radically improved combat capabilities. Project 949 became the pinnacle and the end of the development of highly specialized submarines (aircraft carrier killers).

In December 2011, it became known that the Rubin Central Design Bureau had developed a modernization project. It is planned to replace the P-700 missiles with the more modern P-800 Oniks missiles from the Caliber family. Modification of launch containers is planned, without alteration of the hull. The modernization of the nuclear submarine of the Northern Fleet will be carried out at the Zvezdochka CS, and the Zvezda shipyard.

The design is double-hulled, with a distance between a light and durable body of 3.5 meters, which provides a significant buoyancy margin, up to 30%, and provides additional protection against underwater explosions. For their characteristic appearance, they received the nickname baton, and for their powerful strike weapons they were nicknamed aircraft carrier killers. The robust housing is divided into ten internal compartments.

== Construction and career ==
The submarine was laid down on 25 February 1986 at Sevmash, Severodvinsk. Launched on 16 December 1988 and commissioned on 29 December 1989.

From 1990 to 1991, he was under repair in Severodvinsk.

On 3 June 1992, he was reclassified as a nuclear-powered submarine.

On 6 April 1993, he received the name Voronezh in connection with the establishment of the patronage of the administration of the city of Voronezh over it.

During his first combat service in the Mediterranean, the submarine supported the actions of a detachment of ships of the Russian Navy headed by the TAVKR Admiral of the Fleet of the Soviet Union Kuznetsov.

From 22 June to 26 June 1999, the cruiser took part in the Zapad-99 strategic command and staff exercises, during which she conducted practical missile firing.

In 2006, he arrived at the Zvyozdochka shipyard for emergency repair of the main turbine, as well as replacement of the cores of a nuclear reactor.

In December 2008, he was dry-docked.

In March 2009, repairs and modernization began. On May 26, after passing the course of restoration of technical readiness with elements of medium repair, launching and transfer to the outfitting embankment took place.

In November 2011, based on the results of the work carried out, the service life of the cruiser was extended by 3.5 years.

The ship returned to its point of permanent deployment in March 2012.

On 8 June 2014, Voronezh rescued the crew of the Barents-1100 small boat in the White Sea, which ran out of fuel while trying to bypass the area with unfavorable weather conditions. In September, while participating in tactical exercises of diverse forces of the Northern Fleet, the submarine performed single firing from a submerged position at a sea surface target with a Granit cruise missile.

In October 2017, he successfully fired an anti-ship cruise missile Granit at a conditional target in the Novaya Zemlya archipelago area.

He was put into reserve before decommissioning, and in July 2020 the name Voronezh was given to a new laid down nuclear submarine of Project 885M Yasen-M for the Northern Fleet.

=== Pennant numbers ===
Date	Pennant number
1991	629
1995	812
