= K186 =

K186 or K-186 may refer to:

- K-186 (Kansas highway), a state highway in Kansas
- HMS Anchusa (K186), a former UK Royal Navy ship
- Russian submarine Omsk (K-186), a Russian submarine

== See also ==
- Kepler-186f
- Kepler-186
