= K132 =

K132, or similar, may refer to:

- K-132 (Kansas highway), a former state highway in Kansas
- HMS Vetch (K132), a former UK Royal Navy ship
- Russian submarine Irkutsk (K-132)
- Symphony No. 19 (Mozart) in E♭ major, by Mozart
- IKCO Tara, a car
