= Russian submarine Krasnodar =

Soviet and Russian submarine (1986–2012)

- Oscar II class submarine

History

Soviet Union, Russia
- Name: Krasnodar
- Laid down: 22 July 1982
- Launched: 3 March 1985
- Commissioned: 30 September 1986
- Decommissioned: 2012
- Status: Undergoing scrapping

General characteristics
- Type: Oscar-class submarine
- Displacement: 12,500/14,700 tons surfaced; 16,500/19,400 tons submerged
- Length: 155 m (508 ft 6 in) maximum
- Beam: 18.2 m (59 ft 9 in)
- Draught: 9 m (29 ft 6 in)
- Installed power: 2 × pressurized water cooled reactors (HEU <= 45%)
- Propulsion: 2 × steam turbines delivering 73,070 kW (97,990 shp) to two shafts
- Speed: 15 knots (28 km/h; 17 mph) surfaced; 32 knots (59 km/h; 37 mph) submerged
- Endurance: 120 days
- Test depth: 830 m
- Complement: 94/107
- Armament: 4 × 533 mm (21.0 in) and 2 × 650 mm (26 in) torpedo tubes in bow; 28 × 533 mm and 650 mm weapons, including Tsakra (SS-N-15 Starfish) anti-submarine missiles with 15 kt nuclear warheads and Vodopad/Veter (SS-N-16 Stallion) anti-submarine missiles with 200 kt nuclear warhead or Type 40 anti-submarine torpedo or 32 ground mines; 24 × P-700 Granit (SS-N-19 Shipwreck) cruise missiles with 750 kilograms (1,650 lb) HE or 4 x 500kt Nuclear Warheads

Krasnodar (K-148) was a Russian Oscar II-class submarine which was built at Sevmash under serial number 617, it was launched in March 1985 and decommissioned in late 2012. On March 17, 2014 a fire broke out on or near the vessel during its scrapping at the Nerpa Russian Naval Shipyard near the administratively closed city Snezhnogorsk. A spokesperson for the shipyard reported that the fire was quickly extinguished, without injuries or radioactive releases.

== See also ==
Krasnodar (B-265), a Kilo-class submarine commissioned in 2015.
