= Russian submarine Omsk =

Oscar-class submarine of the Russian Navy

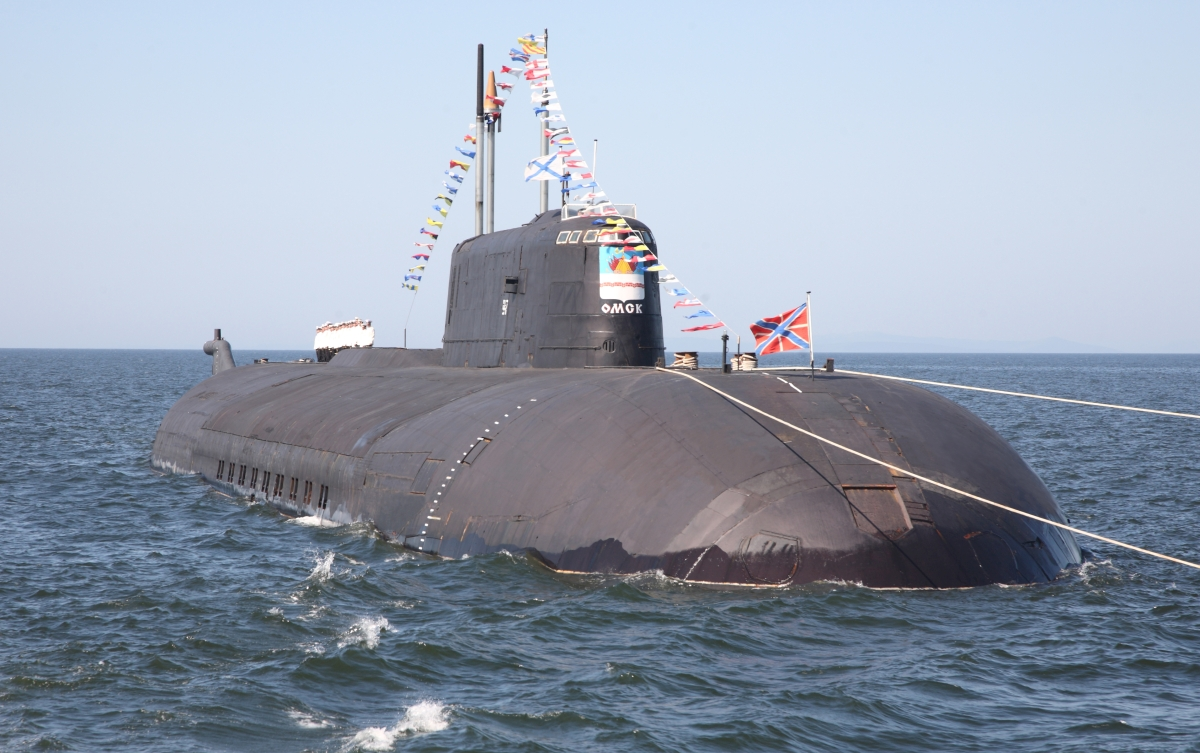
- Omsk

History

Russia
- Name: K-186
- Builder: Sevmash, Severodvinsk
- Laid down: 13 July 1989
- Launched: 10 May 1993
- Commissioned: 15 December 1993
- Renamed: Omsk; (Омск)
- Namesake: Omsk
- Identification: Pennant number: 947
- Status: Active
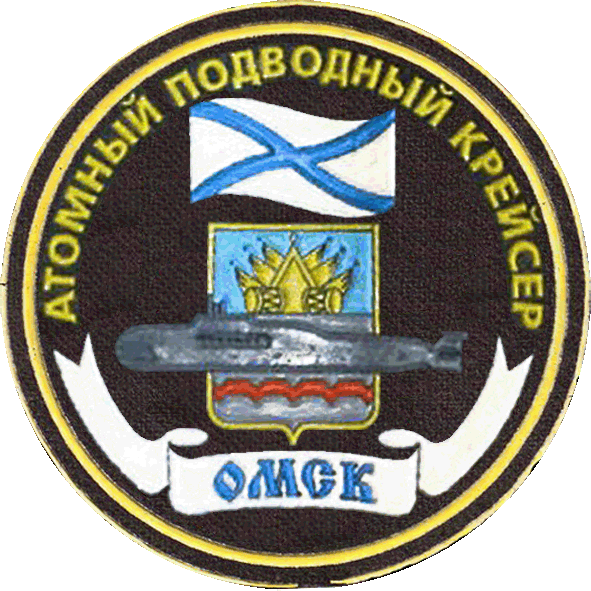
- Badge

General characteristics
- Class & type: Oscar II-class submarine
- Displacement: 12,300–14,500 long tons (12,500–14,700 t) surfaced; 16,200–19,100 long tons (16,500–19,400 t) submerged
- Length: 155 m (508 ft 6 in) maximum
- Beam: 18.2 m (59 ft 9 in)
- Draught: 9 m (29 ft 6 in)
- Installed power: 2 × pressurized water cooled reactors (HEU <= 45%)
- Propulsion: 2 × steam turbines delivering 73,070 kW (97,990 shp) to two shafts
- Speed: 15 knots (28 km/h; 17 mph) surfaced; 32 knots (59 km/h; 37 mph) submerged
- Endurance: 120 days
- Test depth: 600 m
- Complement: 94/107
- Armament: 4 × 533 mm (21.0 in) and 2 × 650 mm (26 in) torpedo tubes in bow; 28 × 533 mm and 650 mm weapons, including RPK-2 Vyuga (SS-N-15 Starfish) anti-submarine missiles with 15 kt nuclear warheads and RPK-6 Vodopad/RPK-7 Veter (SS-N-16) anti-submarine missiles with 200 kt nuclear warhead or Type 40 anti-submarine torpedo or 32 ground mines; 24 × P-700 Granit (SS-N-19 Shipwreck) cruise missiles with 750 kilograms (1,650 lb) HE

Omsk (K-186, Russian: К-186 «Омск») is a Project 949A Oscar-class submarine in the Russian Navy. It is assigned to the Pacific Fleet at Rybachy submarine base.

== Development and design ==
The design assignment was issued in 1969. The development of Project 949 was a new stage in the development of APRC-class submarines, which, in accordance with the concept of asymmetric response, were tasked with countering aircraft carrier strike formations. The new missile submarines were to replace the submarines of Projects 659 and 675 and in accordance with the terms of reference surpassed them in all basic parameters - could launch missiles from both surface and underwater position, had less noise, higher underwater speed, three times higher ammunition, missiles with radically improved combat capabilities. Project 949 became the pinnacle and the end of the development of highly specialized submarines (aircraft carrier killers).

In December 2011, they became known that the Rubin Central Design Bureau had developed a modernization project. It is planned to replace the P-700 missiles with the more modern P-800 Oniks missiles from the Caliber family. Modification of launch containers is planned, without alteration of the hull. The modernization of the nuclear submarine of the Northern Fleet will be carried out at the Zvezdochka CS, and the Zvezda shipyard.

The design is double-hulled, with a distance between a light and durable body of 3.5 meters, which provides a significant buoyancy margin, up to 30%, and provides additional protection against underwater explosions. For their characteristic appearance, they received the nickname baton, and for their powerful strike weapons they were nicknamed aircraft carrier killers. The robust housing is divided into ten internal compartments.

== Construction and career ==
The submarine was laid down on 13 July 1989 at Sevmash, Severodvinsk. Launched on 10 May 1993 and commissioned on 15 December 1993. On 20 February 1993, she was renamed Omsk.

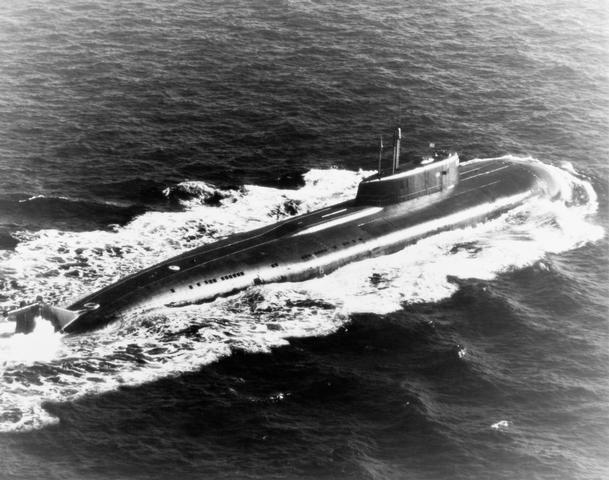
Omsk underway on 5 September 1994

At the end of August 1994, Omsk under the command of Captain 1st Rank A.S. Astapov left the Zapadnaya Litsa Bay, rounded the northern tip of Novaya Zemlya, went under the ice and went out into the high latitudes of the Arctic Ocean by the trench of St. Anna. Then, in difficult hydrometeorological and ice conditions and in navigationally dangerous areas in the shallow waters of the Chukchi Sea, she made the transition and became part of the 10th division of the 2nd flotilla of submarines based in Kamchatka. In 15 days, the submarine covered about 4,000 miles (6,400 km) under the ice. The senior on board was Rear Admiral I. N. Kozlov. For the preparation and implementation of the ice crossing from the North to Kamchatka, both officers were awarded the title of Hero of Russia in 1996.

In 1999 Omsk shadowed the aircraft carrier USS John C. Stennis off San Diego and Hawaii.

In 2013, Omsk under the command of Captain 1st Rank Roman Velichenko became the winner of the competition between multipurpose nuclear-powered ships to search for and destroy enemy submarines with the performance of practical firing with torpedoes.

From 2015 to 2019, Omsk was undergoing repairs and modernization at the Zvezda Aircraft Factory. From May to June it was tested, in June 2019 the submarine was transferred to the Pacific Fleet after modernization.

On 29 June 2019, the press service of the Eastern Military District reported that Omsk was transferred to the Pacific Fleet after the completion of scheduled repairs and technical modernization. The ship handover ceremony took place at the Zvezda shipyard in the Far East in the town of Bolshoy Kamen. Before that, during the tests, the submarine successfully completed a number of test tasks in the waters of the Sea of Japan, including deep-sea diving. All mechanisms and systems have been tested in combat conditions. In the course of modernization, launch complexes of cruise missiles Oniks and 3M-54 Kalibr were installed onboard Omsk. The atomic reactor was also recharged. For the excellent modernization and repair of Omsk, Chief of Staff of the Pacific Fleet - First Deputy Fleet Commander Vice Admiral Sergei Rekish awarded the most employees of the Zvezda plant with medals 110 years of the Russian submarine fleet. On 9 August, the submarine returned to its permanent base in Kamchatka.

In the first post-refit exercise, Omsk successfully destroyed SSBN Alexander Nevsky in a simulated exercise. At the end of 2019, the Omsk crew won two challenge prizes from the Commander-in-Chief of the Navy - for the destruction of enemy ships by firing cruise missiles at sea targets and for the search and destruction of enemy submarines with the execution of a torpedo attack.

In 2019, its commander was Captain 2nd Rank Oleg Aleksandrovich Grishayev.

On 27 August 2020, during the Ocean Shield 2020 exercise, the missile cruiser Varyag and Omsk jointly fired in the Bering Sea; Omsk hit the target with a P-700 Granit missile at a distance of more than 320 kilometers. On 28 August 2020, it surfaced in international territorial waters off the Pacific coast of Alaska, which worried local fishermen.

On 4 August 2021, Omsk returned from deployment, with Kuzbass returning on 24 August.

Again underway on 29 September 2021, firing a Granit missile in a joint exercise with Guards Missile Cruiser Varyag.

On 15 July 2022, Omsk (along with Tomsk and Kuzbass) returned from three month deployment. It was part of a "coercion" exercise, to discourage naval forces of other countries from taking action against Russia during the Russian invasion of Ukraine.

On 19 September 2022, Omsk and SSN Novosibirsk launched Granit (SS-N-19 Shipwreck) and Onyx (SS-N-26 Strobile) cruise missiles against a seaborne target in the Chukchi Sea. In September 2024 it took part in the "OKEAN-2024" exercise, involving 400 vessels and 90,000 personnel. The submarine remained active as of 2025.

It was reported Omsk may have been lost in an explosion on 26 August 2026 in Peter the Great Bay near Volchanets in Primorsky Krai.
