= K173 =

K173 or K-173 may refer to:

- K-173 (Kansas highway), a state highway in Kansas
- Russian submarine Krasnoyarsk (K-173), a Russian submarine
