= Russian submarine Tver =

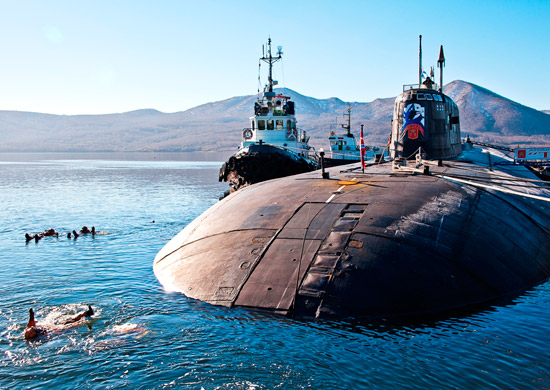
- Tver in 2013

History

Russia
- Name: K-456 Tver
- Namesake: Tver
- Commissioned: 1991
- Home port: Rybachiy

General characteristics
- Class & type: Oscar II-class submarine
- Displacement: 13,400 t, 16,400 t
- Length: 154 m (505 ft 3 in)
- Beam: 18.20 m (59 ft 9 in)
- Draft: 9 m (29 ft 6 in)
- Propulsion: 2 nuclear reactors OK-650b (HEU <= 45%), 2 steam turbines, 2/7-bladed props
- Speed: 32 knots (59 km/h; 37 mph) submerged, 16 knots (30 km/h; 18 mph) surfaced
- Test depth: 300 to 1,000 m (980 to 3,280 ft) (by various estimates)
- Complement: 44 officers, 68 enlisted
- Armament: 24 × SS-N-19/P-700 Granit, 4 × 533 mm and 2 × 650 mm bow torpedo tubes

K-456 Tver, formerly known as K-456 Vilyuchinsk (ex Kasatka), is a Russian Oscar-class submarine of the Russian Navy. It was commissioned in 1991 as part of the Russian Northern Fleet and was transferred to the Russian Pacific Fleet in September 1993. The submarine is currently based at the Rybachiy Nuclear Submarine Base, in Vilyuchinsk, near Petropavlovsk-Kamchatsky. Until 28 January 2011 it was called Vilyuchinsk, when the name was changed to Tver.

As of 2022, it is unclear if the submarine was at sea after its last exit in 2016.
