= K119 =

K119 or K-119 may refer to:

- K-119 (Kansas highway), a state highway in Kansas
- Russian submarine Voronezh (K-119), a Russian Navy submarine
