= K150 =

K150 or K-150 may refer to:

- K-150 (Kansas highway), a state highway in Kansas
- Russian submarine Tomsk (K-150), a Russian submarine
