= MV Krasnodar =

A number of motor vessels have been named Krasnodar, after the city in Russia, including

- MV Krasnodar (1925), a Soviet cargo ship in service 1946–75. IMO Number 5196438
- MV Krasnodar (2003), a Liberian tanker built in 2003. IMO Number 9270517

== See also ==
- Russian submarine Krasnodar (K-148), a Russian Oscar-class submarine
- Krasnodar (disambiguation)
