= Legenda (satellite system) =

Soviet satellite targeting system

Legenda, or the MKRC Legenda system, is a Soviet satellite targeting system mated to the SS-N-19 missile. It consisted of the US-P SIGINT satellites and the US-A Radar Ocean reconnaissance satellites, which were nuclear powered. The Legenda system consists of 37 ELINT satellites named US-P and 32 US-A nuclear powered radar satellites to provide global coverage. Legenda is now non-functional after the US-A and US-P satellites were deactivated. It is being replaced by the Liana system with 4 operational satellites as of July 2021.

== See also ==
- P-700 Granit
