= Russian submarine Krasnoyarsk (K-173) =

Russian Oscar-class submarine

History

Russia
- Name: K-173 Krasnoyarsk
- Laid down: 4 August 1983
- Launched: 27 March 1986
- Commissioned: 31 December 1986
- Fate: Scrapped

General characteristics
- Class & type: Oscar II-class submarine
- Displacement: 13.400 t, 16.400 t
- Length: 154 m (505 ft 3 in)
- Beam: 18.2 m (59 ft 9 in)
- Draft: 9 m (29 ft 6 in)
- Propulsion: 2 nuclear reactors OK-650b (HEU <= 45%), 2 steam turbines, 2/7-bladed props
- Speed: 32 knots (59 km/h; 37 mph) submerged, 16 knots (30 km/h; 18 mph) surfaced
- Test depth: 300 to 1,000 m (980 to 3,280 ft) (by various estimates)
- Complement: 44 officers, 68 enlisted
- Armament: 24 × SS-N-19/P-700 Granit; 4 × 533 mm and 2 x 650 mm bow torpedo tubes

K-173 Krasnoyarsk was an Oscar-class submarine which was commissioned on 31 December 1986, and entered service with the Russian Navy. Krasnoyarsk has been removed from active service.

On 29 April 2016, the boat caught fire whilst being scrapped at Vilyuchinsk and was scuttled to extinguish the fire.
