= Russian submarine Kursk =

Oscar-II class cruise missile submarine

- Wreck of Kursk in a floating dock at Roslyakovo.

History

Russia
- Name: K-141 Kursk
- Namesake: Battle of Kursk
- Laid down: 1990
- Launched: 1994
- Commissioned: 30 December 1994
- Stricken: 12 August 2000
- Fate: All 118 hands lost in 100 m (330 ft) of water in Barents Sea on 12 August 2000
- Status: Raised from the seafloor (except bow), towed to shipyard, and dismantled

General characteristics
- Class & type: Oscar II-class submarine
- Displacement: 13,400 to 16,400 tonnes (13,200 to 16,100 long tons; 14,800 to 18,100 short tons)
- Length: 154.0 m (505.2 ft)
- Beam: 18.2 m (60 ft)
- Draft: 9.0 m (29.5 ft)
- Propulsion: 2 OK-650b nuclear reactors (HEU <= 45%), 2 steam turbines, two 7-bladed propellers
- Speed: 32 knots (59 km/h; 37 mph) submerged, 16 knots (30 km/h; 18 mph) surfaced
- Test depth: 300 to 500 m (980 to 1,640 ft) by various estimates
- Complement: 44 officers, 68 enlisted
- Armament: 24 × SS-N-19/P-700 Granit, 4 × 533 mm (21 in) and 2 × 650 mm (26 in) torpedo tubes (bow); 24 torpedoes
- Notes: Home port: Vidyayevo, Russia

K-141 Kursk (Russian: Курск) (Note: In full, Russian: Атомная Подводная Лодка «Курск» (АПЛ «Курск»), romanised: Atomnaya Podvodnaya Lodka "Kursk" (APL "Kursk"), lit. 'Atomic-powered submarine Kursk') was an Oscar II-class nuclear-powered cruise missile submarine of the Russian Navy. On 12 August 2000, K-141 Kursk was lost when it sank in the Barents Sea, killing all 118 personnel on board.

== Construction ==
Silhouette of an Oscar-II class submarine

K-141 Kursk was a Project 949A class Antey (Russian: Aнтей, meaning Antaeus) submarine of the Oscar class, known as the Oscar II by its NATO reporting name, and was the penultimate submarine of the Oscar II class designed and approved in the Soviet Union. Construction began in 1990 at the Soviet Navy military shipyards in Severodvinsk, near Arkhangelsk, in the northern Russian SFSR. During the construction of K-141, the Soviet Union collapsed; work continued, and she became one of the first naval vessels completed after the collapse. In 1993 K-141 was named Kursk after the Battle of Kursk, on the 50-year anniversary of this battle. K-141 was inherited by Russia and launched in 1994, before being commissioned by the Russian Navy on 30 December, as part of the Russian Northern Fleet.

Kursk was assigned to the home port of Vidyayevo, Murmansk Oblast.

== Capabilities ==
The Antey design represented the highest achievement of Soviet nuclear submarine technology. They are the second-largest cruise missile submarines ever built, after some Ohio-class submarines converted to carry cruise missiles in 2007. Kursk was built to defeat an entire United States Navy carrier strike group. A single Type 65 torpedo carried a 450 kg (990 lb) warhead powerful enough to sink an aircraft carrier. Both missiles and torpedoes could be equipped with nuclear warheads. She was 9.1 m (30 ft) longer than the preceding Oscar I-class submarines. The senior officers had individual cabins and the entire crew had access to a gymnasium.

Her outer hull, made of high-nickel, high-chromium stainless steel 8.5 mm (0.33 in) thick, had exceptional corrosion resistance and a weak magnetic signature, helping to conceal it from U.S. magnetic anomaly detector (MAD) systems. There was a 200 mm (7.9 in) gap to the 50.8 mm (2.00 in)-thick steel pressure hull. She was designed to remain submerged for up to 120 days. The sail superstructure was reinforced to allow it to break through Arctic ice. The submarine was armed with 24 SS-N-19/P-700 Granit cruise missiles, and eight torpedo tubes in the bow: four 533 mm (21 in) and four 650 mm (26 in). With a range of 550 km (340 mi), Granit missiles were capable of supersonic flight at altitudes over 20 km (12 mi). They were designed to swarm enemy vessels and intelligently choose individual targets which terminated with a dive onto the target. Kursk's torpedo tubes could launch either torpedoes or anti-ship missiles with a range of 50 km (31 mi). Her weapons included 18 SS-N-16 "Stallion" anti-submarine missiles.

Kursk was part of Russia's Northern Fleet, which suffered funding cuts throughout the 1990s. Many of its submarines were anchored and rusting in Zapadnaya Litsa Naval Base, 100 km (62 mi) from Murmansk. Little work to maintain all but the most essential front-line equipment, including search and rescue equipment, was performed. Northern Fleet sailors had gone unpaid in the mid-1990s.

== Deployments ==
During her five years of service, Kursk completed only one mission, a six-month deployment to the Mediterranean Sea during the summer of 1999 to monitor the United States Sixth Fleet responding to the Kosovo crisis. As a result, many of her crew had spent little time at sea and were inexperienced.

== Naval exercise and disaster ==
Kursk joined the "Summer-X" exercise, the first large-scale naval exercise planned by the Russian Navy in more than a decade, on 10 August 2000. It included 30 ships including the fleet's flagship Pyotr Velikiy, four attack submarines, and a flotilla of smaller ships. The crew had recently won a citation for its excellent performance and had been recognised as the best submarine crew in the Northern Fleet. While on an exercise, Kursk loaded a full complement of combat weapons. It was one of the few vessels authorised to carry a combat load at all times.

=== Explosion ===
On the first day of the exercise, Kursk successfully launched a Granit missile armed with a dummy warhead. Two days later, on the morning of 12 August, Kursk prepared to fire dummy torpedoes at the Kirov-class battlecruiser Pyotr Velikiy. These practice torpedoes had no explosive warheads and were manufactured and tested at a much lower quality standard. On 12 August 2000, at 11:28 local time (07:28 UTC), there was an explosion while preparing to fire. The Russian Navy's final report on the disaster concluded the explosion was due to the failure of one of Kursk's hydrogen peroxide-fuelled Type 65 torpedoes. A subsequent investigation concluded that high-test peroxide (HTP), a form of highly concentrated hydrogen peroxide used as propellant, seeped through a faulty weld in the torpedo casing. When HTP comes into contact with a catalyst, it rapidly expands by a factor of 5000, generating vast quantities of steam and oxygen. The pressure produced by the expanding HTP ruptured the kerosene fuel tank in the torpedo and set off an explosion equal to 100–250 kilograms (220–550 lb) of TNT. The submarine sank in relatively shallow water, bottoming at a depth of 108 metres (354 ft) about 135 km (84 mi) off Severomorsk, at 69°40′N 37°35′E. A second explosion 135 seconds after the initial event was equivalent to 3-7 tons of TNT. The explosions blew a large hole in the hull and caused the first three compartments of the submarine to collapse, killing or incapacitating all but 23 of the 118 personnel on board.

=== Rescue attempts ===
The British and Norwegian navies offered assistance, but Russia initially refused all help. All 118 sailors and officers aboard Kursk died. The Russian Admiralty initially told the public that the majority of the crew died within minutes of the explosion. On 21 August, Norwegian and Russian divers found 24 bodies in the ninth compartment, the turbine room at the stern. Captain-lieutenant Dmitri Kolesnikov wrote a note listing the names of 23 sailors who were alive in the compartment after the sinking.

Kursk carried a potassium superoxide chemical oxygen generator cartridge; these are used to absorb carbon dioxide and chemically release oxygen during an emergency. However, the cartridge became contaminated with sea water and the resulting chemical reaction caused a flash fire, consuming the available oxygen. Investigation showed that some personnel temporarily survived the fire by plunging under water, as fire marks on the bulkheads indicated the water was at waist level at the time. Ultimately, the remaining crew burned to death or suffocated.

Putin interview on the tragedy (with subtitles)

Russian president Vladimir Putin, though immediately informed of the tragedy, was assured by the Navy that the situation was under control and the crew's rescue was imminent. He waited for five days before ending his holiday at a presidential resort in Sochi on the Black Sea. Only four months into his presidency, he was highly criticised by the media and public alike for choosing to remain at the resort. Previously highly popular, his approval rating dropped dramatically. The president's response appeared callous and the government's actions looked incompetent. A year later he said, "I probably should have returned to Moscow, but nothing would have changed. I had the same level of communication both in Sochi and in Moscow, but from a PR point of view I could have demonstrated some special eagerness to return."

== Submarine recovery ==
Submarine wreck after the disaster

A consortium formed by the Dutch companies Mammoet and Smit International was awarded a contract by Russia to raise the vessel, excluding the bow. They modified the barge Giant 4 which raised Kursk and recovered the remains of her crew.

During salvage operations in 2001, the team first cut the bow off the hull using a tungsten carbide-studded cable. As this tool had the potential to cause sparks which could ignite remaining pockets of reactive gases, such as hydrogen, the operation was executed with care. Most of the bow was abandoned and the rest of the vessel was towed to Severomorsk and placed in a floating dry dock for analysis.

The remains of Kursk's reactor compartment were towed to Sayda Bay on Russia's northern Kola Peninsula, where more than 50 reactor compartments were afloat at pier points, after a shipyard drained all the fuel from the wreck in early 2003.

Some torpedo and torpedo tube fragments from the bow were recovered; the rest was destroyed by explosives in 2002.

== Official inquiry results ==
Not withstanding the Navy's oft-stated position that a collision with a foreign vessel had triggered the event, a report issued by the government attributed the disaster to a torpedo explosion caused when high-test peroxide (HTP), a form of highly concentrated hydrogen peroxide, leaked from a faulty weld in the torpedo's casing. The report found that the initial explosion destroyed the torpedo room compartment, killing everyone within the first compartment. The blast entered the second and perhaps the third and fourth compartments through an air conditioning vent. All of the 36 men in second compartment command post were immediately incapacitated or killed by the blast wave. The first explosion caused a fire that raised the temperature of the compartment above 2,700 °C (4,890 °F). The heat caused the warheads of between five and seven additional torpedoes to detonate, creating an explosion equivalent to 2–3 tons of TNT measuring 4.2 on the Richter magnitude scale on seismographs across Europe. The explosion was detected as far away as Alaska.

=== Alternative explanation ===
Vice-admiral Valery Ryazantsev disagreed with the government's official conclusion. He blamed the disaster on inadequate training, poor maintenance, and incomplete inspections that caused the crew to mishandle the weapon. Examining the wrecked sub, investigators recovered a partially burned copy of the safety instructions for loading HTP torpedoes, but the instructions were for a significantly different type of torpedo and omitted essential steps for testing an air valve. The 7th Division, 1st Submarine Flotilla never inspected the crew's qualifications and readiness to fire HTP torpedoes. Kursk's crew had no experience with such torpedoes and had not been trained in handling or firing them. Ryazantsev believes the lack of training and improper manuals, compounded by incomplete inspections and oversight, set off a chain of events that led to the first explosion when the inexperienced crew loaded the practice torpedo.

== Media ==
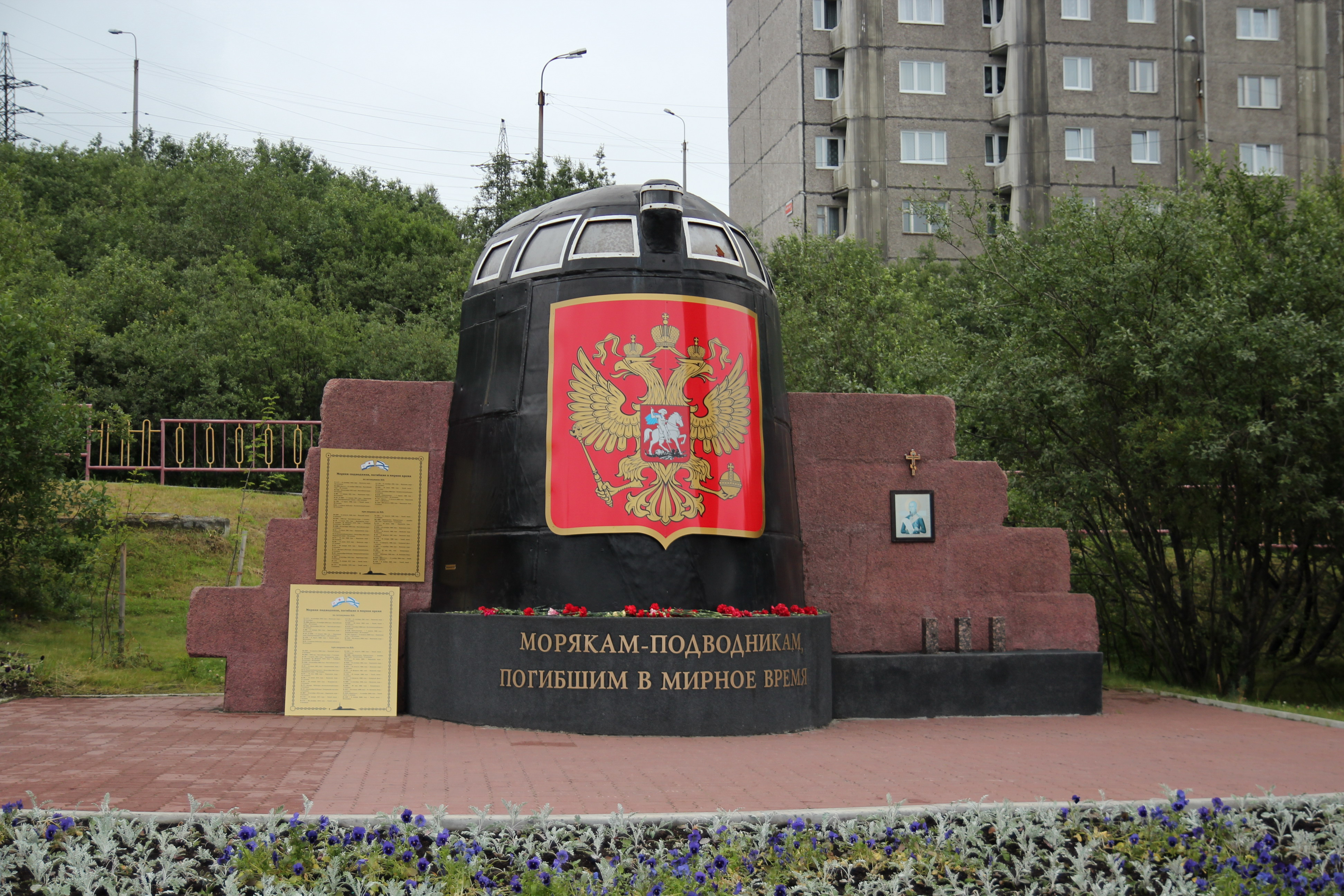
Monument over Kursk.

=== Books ===
- Truscott, Peter (2002), Kursk: Russia's Lost Pride. Simon & Schuster UK. ISBN 0-7432-3072-8
- Dunmore, Spencer (2002), Lost Subs: From the "Hunley" to the "Kursk", the Greatest Submarines Ever Lost – And Found. Cambridge, MA: Da Capo. ISBN 0-306-81140-5
- Moore, Robert (2002), A Time to Die: The Untold Story of the Kursk Tragedy. Crown Publishers NY, NY. ISBN 978-0609610008
- Weir, Gary E. and Boyne, Walter J. (2003), Rising Tide: The Untold Story Of The Russian Submarines That Fought The Cold War. Basic Books, NY, NY. ISBN 978-0465091126
- Flynn, Ramsey (2004), Cry from the Deep: The Sinking of the Kursk, the Submarine Disaster That Riveted the World and Put the New Russia to the Ultimate Test. Harper Collins. ISBN 978-0060936419
- Rear Admiral Mian Zahir Shah (2005) Sea Phoenix: A True Submarine Story. ISBN 978-9698318048

=== Songs ===
- "Travel Is Dangerous", a song from the album Mr Beast by post-rock band Mogwai.
- Finnish doom metal band Kypck is claimed to have cross-references both to the Battle of Kursk and the submarine named after the city.
- "Капитан Колесников" (Captain Kolesnikov), a song by the Russian rock band DDT
- "The Kursk" is a song by Matt Elliott from his album Drinking Songs
- "Angel 141 (Russian: Ангел 141)" is a song by Amatory from the album DOOM (2019)
- "K-141 Kursk" is a song by heavy metal band Wolf from their album Legions of Bastards
- "Kursk", a song by the Massachusetts-based melodic hardcore band A Wilhelm Scream on their 2004 album Mute Print
- "Den ensomme Nordens dronning" (The Lonely Queen of the North) is a song by the Dutch brutal death metal band The Monolith Deathcult, from their 2008 album "III - Trivmvirate"

=== Theatre ===
- Kursk – a play by playwright Bryony Lavery from the British point of view.

=== Movies ===
- Kursk (also known as "The Command", and "Kursk: The Last Mission"). - The film from 2018 follows the 2000 K-141 Kursk submarine disaster and the governmental negligence that followed. By Thomas Vinterberg.

== See also ==
- 2008 Russian submarine accident
- List of Russian military accidents
- List of sunken nuclear submarines
- Major submarine incidents since 2000
- Submarines destroyed by hot-running torpedoes: HMS Sidon, and possibly USS Scorpion and PNS Ghazi
- Igor Spasskiy – The designer of the Oscar II class
