= Russian submarine Arkhangelsk (K-525) =

Soviet nuclear-powered cruise missile sub

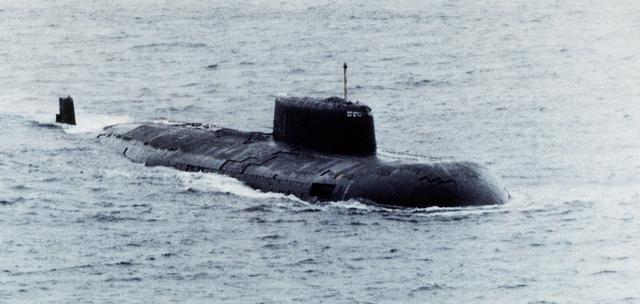
- Oscar I-class submarine in 1987, either Arkhangelsk or Murmansk

History

→ Soviet Union → Russia
- Name: K-525; Arkhangelsk
- Namesake: Arkhangelsk
- Builder: Sevmash
- Laid down: 25 July 1975
- Launched: 3 May 1980
- Commissioned: 30 December 1980
- In service: 24 January 1981
- Out of service: 1996
- Fate: Scrapped from January 2004 to February 2005

General characteristics
- Class & type: Oscar-class submarine
- Displacement: 12,500 t (12,300 long tons) surfaced; 22,500 t (22,100 long tons) submerged
- Length: 122 m (400 ft 3 in)
- Beam: 18.2 m (59 ft 9 in)
- Draft: 9 m (29 ft 6 in)
- Installed power: 2 × nuclear reactors
- Propulsion: 2 × steam turbines; 2 × shafts
- Speed: 16 kn (30 km/h; 18 mph) surfaced; 32 kn (59 km/h; 37 mph) submerged
- Test depth: 600 m (1,968 ft 6 in)
- Complement: 94 officers and sailors
- Armament: 24 × missile silos; 6 × torpedo tubes

Arkhangelsk (K-525, Russian: К-525 «Архангельск») was the lead ship of the Project 949 Oscar-class of nuclear-powered cruise missile submarines of the Russian Navy and formerly the Soviet Navy. Arkhangelsk was one of the two Oscar I variant submarines, along with Murmansk. The vessel was laid down on 25 July 1975 at the Sevmash shipyard in Severodvinsk, launched on 3 May 1980, and commissioned on 30 December 1980 as K-525. It entered service with the Northern Fleet on 24 January 1981.

K-525 later received the name Arkhangelsk and remained in the Navy until it was decommissioned in 1996. Both of the two Oscar I-class submarines were to be scrapped. The process of dismantling Arkhangelsk and Murmansk began in 2004 and was completed in 2005.

== Design ==
The Project 949 (NATO reporting name Oscar) class was part of the third generation of Soviet nuclear-powered submarines. In 1967 work began on the P-700 Granit anti-ship missile, a long-range cruise missile designed to target NATO carrier battle groups. The development of a submarine that would carry the missile was started by the Rubin Design Bureau in 1969.

The Oscar class has a double hull, with twelve missile silos on each side in between the outer hull and the pressure hull. In total it holds 24 Granit missiles. As a result the submarine had a broad beam of 18.2 m (59 ft 9 in), along with a length of 144 m (472 ft 5 in) and a draft of 9 m (29 ft 6 in). It had a surface displacement of 12,500 tonnes (12,300 long tons) and a submerged displacement of 22,500 tonnes (22,100 long tons). By displacement, the Oscar-class boats were the second largest submarines in the world at the time, after the Soviet Project 941 Typhoon-class. By length they were the third largest, after the Typhoon and the United States Navy's Ohio-class.

The pressure hull was divided into nine compartments. It also had an escape chamber that can carry its entire crew to the surface. The submarine's power source were two OK-650 pressurized water reactors, and its propulsion included two steam turbines, which provided 100,000 horsepower to drive the two propeller shafts. This gave it a top speed of 16 kn (30 km/h; 18 mph) while on the surface and 32 kn (59 km/h; 37 mph) while submerged. Its armament also included four 533 mm (21.0 in) and two 650 mm (26 in) torpedo tubes on the bow, which could fire torpedoes or missiles. The Oscar-class submarines have an antenna that allows them to receive targeting information from satellites. It had a test depth of 600 m (1,968 ft 6 in), and the crew consisted of 94 officers and sailors.

== History ==
K-525, the lead ship of the Project 949 Oscar-class, was laid down on 25 July 1975 at the Sevmash shipyard in Severodvinsk, launched on 3 May 1980, and commissioned on 30 December 1980. It entered service in the Northern Fleet of the Soviet Navy on 24 January 1981. Besides K-525 only one other Project 949 submarine was made, K-206, and after it was complete the next vessels of the class were given upgrades, becoming the Project 949A (Oscar II).

In 1987 and 1988 K-525 won the prize of the Navy commander-in-chief for successful missile launches. At some point it received the name Arkhangelsk. In 1996 Arkhangelsk was decommissioned, despite the fact that it was reported to be in good condition and had only served half of its expected service life. Both it and its sister ship, K-206 (renamed Murmansk), were to be removed from service and scrapped, on order of commander-in-chief, Admiral of the Fleet Feliks Gromov. After its decommissioning, the name Arkhangelsk was given to the Typhoon-class submarine TK-17.

From 1998 the two submarines awaited dismantling in Severodvinsk. In January 2004, the process of breaking up Arkhangelsk and Murmansk began, and was completed in February 2005, with funding from the United Kingdom. Their empty reactor compartments were moved to the Sayda Bay storage facility.

== Sources ==
- Gardiner, Robert & Chumbley, Stephen, eds. (1995). Conway's All the World's Fighting Ships 1947–1995. London: Conway Maritime Press. ISBN 1-55750-132-7.
- Polmar, Norman; Moore, K. J. (2003). Cold War Submarines: The Design and Construction of U.S. and Soviet Submarines, 1945–2001. Dulles, Virginia: Potomac Books Inc. ISBN 1-57488-594-4.
- Polmar, Norman; Noot, Jurrien (1991). Submarines of the Russian and Soviet Navies, 1718–1990. Annapolis, Maryland: Naval Institute Press. ISBN 0-87021-570-1.
