= Krasnodarsky =

Krasnodarsky (masculine), Krasnodarskaya (feminine), or Krasnodarskoye (neuter) may refer to:

- Krasnodar Krai (Krasnodarsky krai), a federal subject of Russia
- Krasnodarsky (rural locality) (Krasnodarskaya, Krasnodarskoye), name of several rural localities in Russia
