= Oscar-class submarine =

Soviet nuclear cruise missile submarine class

Oscar II class
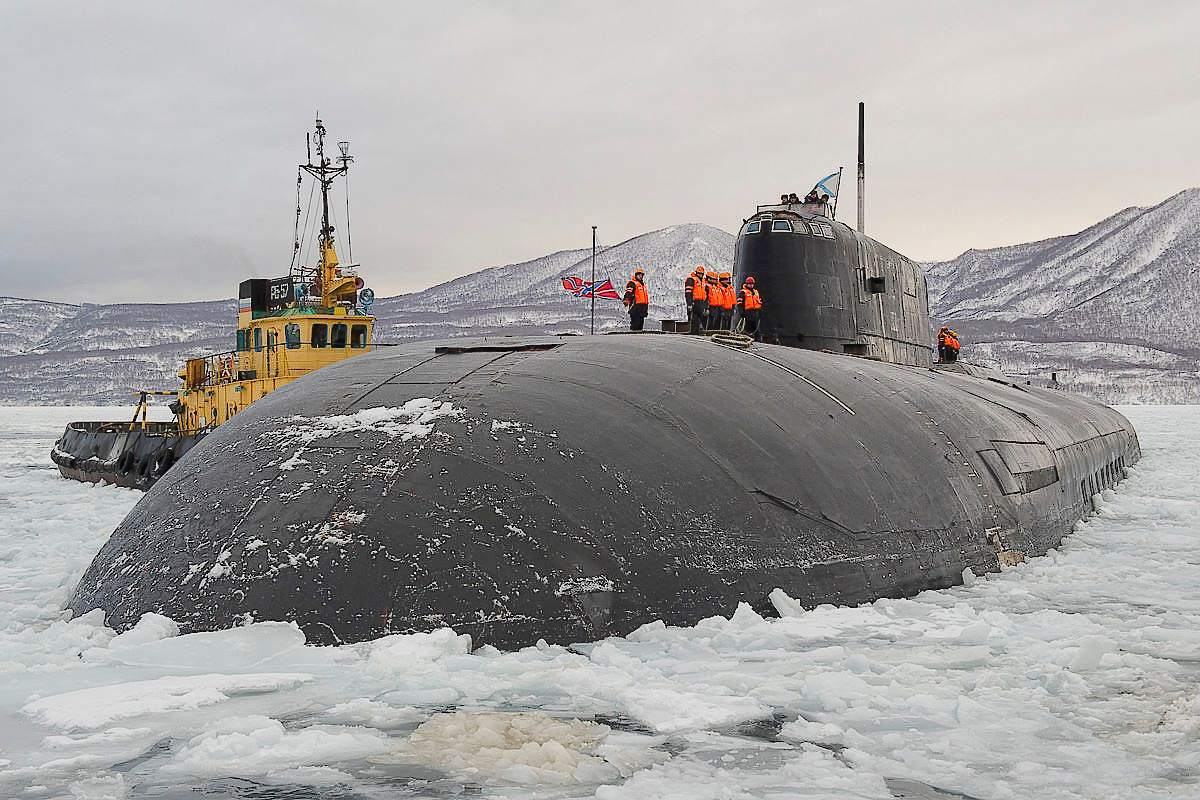
- K-150 Tomsk in Vilyuchinsk, Russia December, 2015

Class overview
- Name: Oscar II class
- Builders: Sevmash
- Operators: Soviet Navy; Russian Navy
- Preceded by: Papa class; Charlie class
- Succeeded by: Yasen class
- Built: 1975–2022, may be restarted
- In commission: 1980–present
- Planned: 20 (2 949, 18 949A)
- Completed: 14 (2 949, 11 949A, 1 09852)
- Canceled: 6 (2 incomplete, 4 never laid down)
- Active: 6 (modernization of some boats to 949AM)
- Laid up: 2
- Lost: 1
- Retired: 5?

General characteristics
- Type: Nuclear-powered cruise missile submarine
- Displacement: 12,500/14,700 tonnes surfaced; 16,500/19,400 tonnes submerged
- Length: 155 m (508 ft 6 in) maximum
- Beam: 18.2 m (59 ft 9 in)
- Draught: 9 m (29 ft 6 in)
- Installed power: 2 × pressurized water cooled reactors, HEU ≤ 45%
- Propulsion: 2 × steam turbines delivering 73,070 kW (97,990 shp) to two shafts
- Speed: 15 knots (28 km/h; 17 mph) surfaced; 32 knots (59 km/h; 37 mph) submerged
- Endurance: 120 days
- Test depth: 600 m
- Complement: 94/107
- Armament: 4 × 533 mm (21.0 in) and 2 × 650 mm (26 in) torpedo tubes in bow; 28 × 533 mm and 650 mm weapons, including RPK-2 Vyuga (SS-N-15 Starfish) anti-submarine missiles with 15 kt nuclear warheads and RPK-6 Vodopad/RPK-7 Veter (SS-N-16) anti-submarine missiles with 200 kt nuclear warhead or Type 40 anti-submarine torpedo or 32 ground mines; 24 × P-700 Granit (SS-N-19 Shipwreck) cruise missiles with 750 kilograms (1,650 lb) HE or 6 × 100 Mt Poseidon nuclear-powered, nuclear-armed drones

The Oscar class, Soviet designations Project 949 Granit and Project 949A Antey (NATO reporting names Oscar I and Oscar II, respectively), are a series of nuclear-powered cruise-missile submarines designed in the Soviet Union for the Soviet Navy. First built in the 1970s, six remain in service with the Russian Navy. Two other vessels were slated to be modernized since at least 2017 as Project 949AM, to extend their service life and increase combat capabilities but it is unclear whether work continues as of 2023.

The Project 949 submarines were the largest cruise-missile submarines in service until some Ohio-class ballistic-missile submarines were converted to carry cruise missiles in 2007. They are the fourth-largest class of submarines in displacement and length. Only the Soviet Typhoon-class, Russian Borei-class, and American Ohio-class ballistic-missile submarines are larger.

== History ==
The first submarine of Project 949 was laid down in the mid-1970s and was commissioned in 1980. In 1982, an updated and larger version (Project 949A) replaced the earlier version. In total, 14 submarines were constructed. The Oscar class was designed to attack NATO carrier battle groups using long-range P-700 Granit (SS-N-19 "Shipwreck") antiship missiles and targeting data provided by the EORSAT satellite system (via the submarine's "Punch Bowl" antenna). In the financial problems that followed the fall of the Soviet Union, the Oscar class was prioritized by the Russian Navy, and when many older submarine classes were retired, the Oscar class remained active in both the Northern and Pacific Fleets.

=== Modernization ===
The Rubin Design Bureau started working on Project 949A modernization in 2011, with Zvezdochka and Zvezda shipyards to carry out modernization of the vessels. In September 2015, Russian Defence Minister Sergey Shoygu announced during his visit to Zvezda shipyard that at least three Oscar-class submarines were to undergo repair and modernization to extend their service life by 20 years. The upgraded submarines will be known as "Project 949AM", according to the Russian officials. Modernization cost was estimated at RUB12 billion (US$182 million) per submarine.

In September 2016, Tass reported submarines K-132 Irkutsk and K-442 Chelyabinsk were then being modernized to 949AM. According to the Deputy Prime Minister of Russia Yury Borisov, Russia's Pacific Fleet may get four modernized Oscar II-class submarines armed with Kalibr cruise missiles by 2021.

== Versions ==
=== Project 949 Granit (Oscar I) ===
Project 949

Two Project 949 Granit submarines were built at Severodvinsk between 1975 and 1982 and assigned to the Soviet Northern Fleet. K-525 was laid down in 1975 and K-206 was laid down in 1979. After the construction of the first two submarines, production continued with the improved project 949A Antey. Both submarines of the Project 949 were decommissioned in 1996 and scrapped in 2004.

=== Project 949A Antei (Oscar II) ===
Project 949A

Eleven Project 949A Antey submarines were completed at Severodvinsk, of which five were assigned to the Soviet Northern Fleet. At one stage, a new fourth-generation follow-on to the Project 949A had been planned, but this was later dropped. The external differences between the two classes were that the 949A class is about 10 metres (33 ft) longer than its predecessor (around 154 metres, 505 ft rather than 143 m, 469 ft), providing space and buoyancy for improved electronics and quieter propulsion.

Some sources speculate that the acoustic performance of the Oscar II class is superior to early Akula class, but inferior to the Akula II class, as well as subsequent (fourth-generation) designs. It also has a larger fin, and its propellers have seven blades instead of four.

Like all post-World War II Soviet designs, they are of double-hull construction. Similar to other Soviet submarine designs, Project 949 not only has a bridge open to the elements on top of the sail, but also for use in inclement weather has an enclosed bridge forward and slightly below this station. A distinguishing mark is a slight bulge at the top of the fin. A large door on either side of the fin reaches this bulge. These are wider at the top than on the bottom, and are hinged on the bottom. The Federation of American Scientists reports that this submarine carries an emergency crew escape capsule; these doors possibly cover it. The VSK escape capsule can accommodate 110 people.

=== Project 949AM ===
Modernization of Project 949A submarines, first announced by the Russian Defence Ministry in 2011. As part of the modernization, submarines were to have their 24 P-700 Granit antiship missiles replaced with up to 72 newer 3M-54 Kalibr or P-800 Oniks antiship cruise missiles. The upgrade requires no design changes to the hull, as the new missiles can fit into the existing launchers outside the pressure hull. The modernized boats also were to get upgraded Omnibus-M combat information and Simfoniya-3.2 navigation systems, as well as new fire-control system, communications, sonar, radar, and electronic intercept equipment. The modernization aims to bring the submarines up to the same technological level as Russia's next-generation Yasen-class nuclear-powered, cruise-missile submarines.

=== Belgorod, Project 09852 ===
In December 2012, construction began on a special-purpose research and rescue submarine, designated Project 09852, and based on the incomplete Project 949A (Oscar II class) submarine Belgorod. The submarine is reportedly designed to carry both manned (e.g. Project 18511 midget submarine) and unmanned (e.g. Klavesin-1R) underwater vessels. However, while carrying smaller unmanned underwater vehicles (UUVs) would be possible as-is on an Oscar-class hull, the accommodation of a midget submarine such as Project 18511 Paltus or the even larger Project 10831 Losharik, probably would require a major hull extension to accommodate a docking compartment. For example, the length of the submarine BS-64 Podmoskovye was increased by 9 metres (30 ft), though the SLBM missile compartment was completely removed.

Belgorod reportedly was to be used as a carrier of the rumored Poseidon (NATO reporting name Kanyon) nuclear-powered, thermonuclear-armed, unmanned underwater device capable to carry a 100 Mt thermonuclear warhead, with at least four such devices being carried horizontally in place of the 24 P-700 Granit (SS-N-19 Shipwreck) launchers for a total yield of 600 Mt of TNT.

Belgorod was estimated to be 184 metres (604 ft) long, which would make her the longest submarine in the world.

On 23 April 2019, Belgorod was floated out of a slipway during a ceremony at the Sevmash shipyard, watched by the President of Russia Vladimir Putin via a TV link. Further work was to be completed afloat and the submarine was scheduled to start its factory and state trials in 2020, after which it was to be delivered to the Russian Navy. However, this schedule was delayed with sea trials then projected to begin in May 2021. After some delays, sea trials were reported to have started on June 25, 2021. The submarine was delivered to the Russian Navy on 8 July 2022.

== Units ==
No	Name	Project	Laid down	Launched	Commissioned	Fleet	Status
K-525	Arkhangelsk	949	25 July 1975	3 May 1980	30 December 1980	Northern	Scrapped in 2005
K-206	Murmansk (ex-Minskiy Komsomolets)	949	22 April 1979	10 December 1982	30 November 1983	Northern	Scrapped by 2005
K-148	Krasnodar	949A	22 July 1982	3 March 1985	30 September 1986	Northern	Scrapped in 2014
K-173	Krasnoyarsk	949A	4 August 1983	27 March 1986	31 December 1986	Pacific	Scrapped in 2016/17
K-132	Irkutsk	949A	8 May 1985	27 December 1987	30 December 1988	Pacific	Reported to have decommissioned December 2025
K-119	Voronezh	949A	25 February 1986	16 December 1988	29 December 1989	Northern	Inactive, in reserve from 2020
K-410	Smolensk	949A	9 December 1986	20 January 1990	22 December 1990	Northern	Active, after overhaul completed in December 2013
K-442	Chelyabinsk	949A	21 May 1987	18 June 1990	28 December 1990	Pacific	In modernization to 949AM at Zvezda shipyard since 2016.
K-456	Tver (ex-Kasatka, Vilyuchinsk)	949A	9 February 1988	28 June 1991	18 August 1992	Pacific	In reserve as of 2026
K-266	Orel (ex-Severodvinsk)	949A	19 January 1989	22 May 1992	30 December 1992	Northern	Active, after overhaul completed in April 2017
K-186	Omsk	949A	13 July 1989	10 May 1993	15 December 1993	Pacific	Active, after overhaul completed in 2008
K-150	Tomsk	949A	27 August 1991	20 July 1996	30 December 1996	Pacific	Active, after overhaul completed in 2019
K-141	Kursk	949A	22 March 1992	16 May 1994	30 December 1994	Northern	Lost on 12 August 2000

== Gallery ==
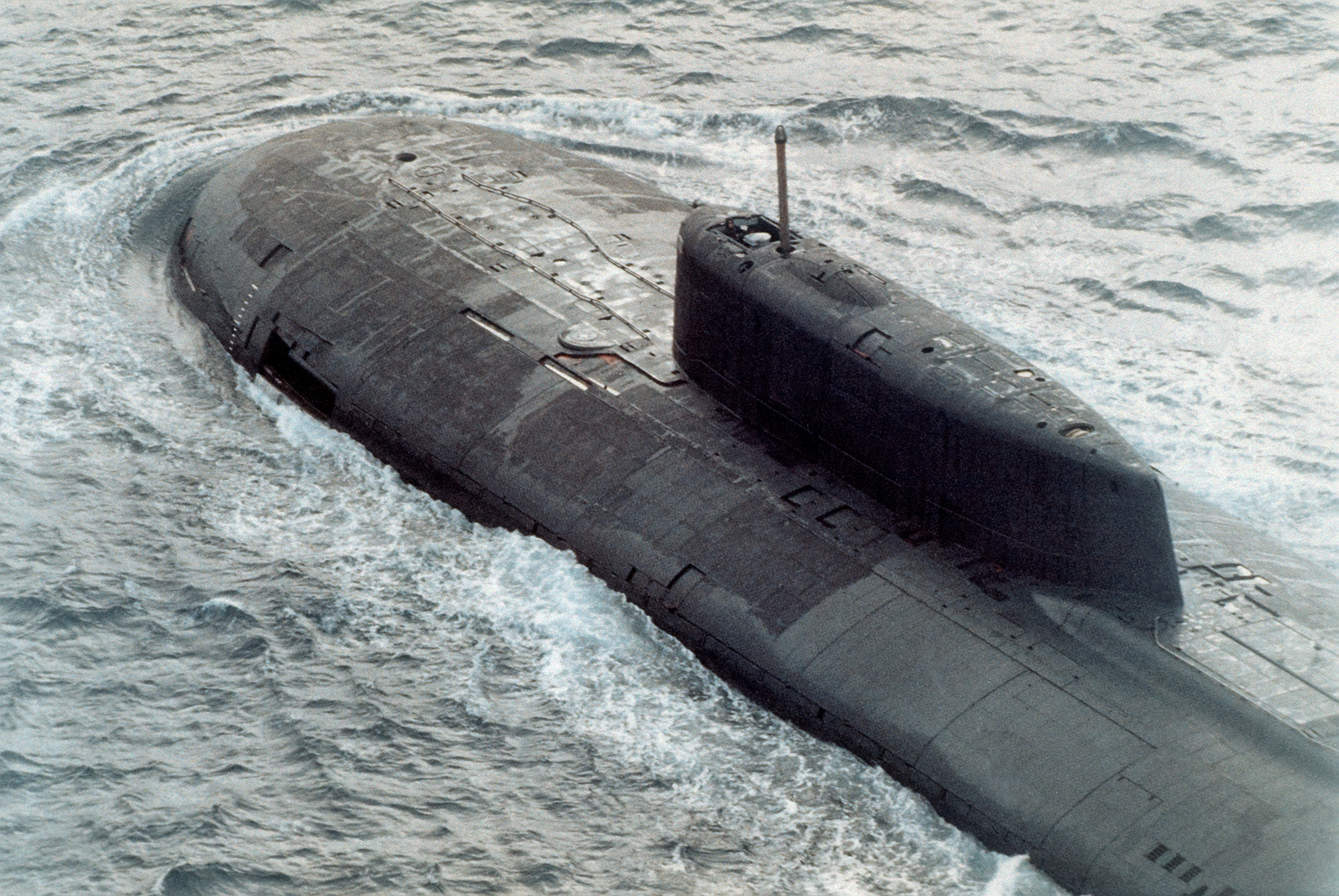
This picture clearly displays the arrangement of the hatches in the hull above the missile tubes, on either side of the dorsal fin. Also shown is the opening for the forward hydroplane (currently folded in), as well as the bulge on the top of the fin under which the rescue capsule is located. Although partially obscured by shadow, the seam between the capsule and the fin is faintly visible.

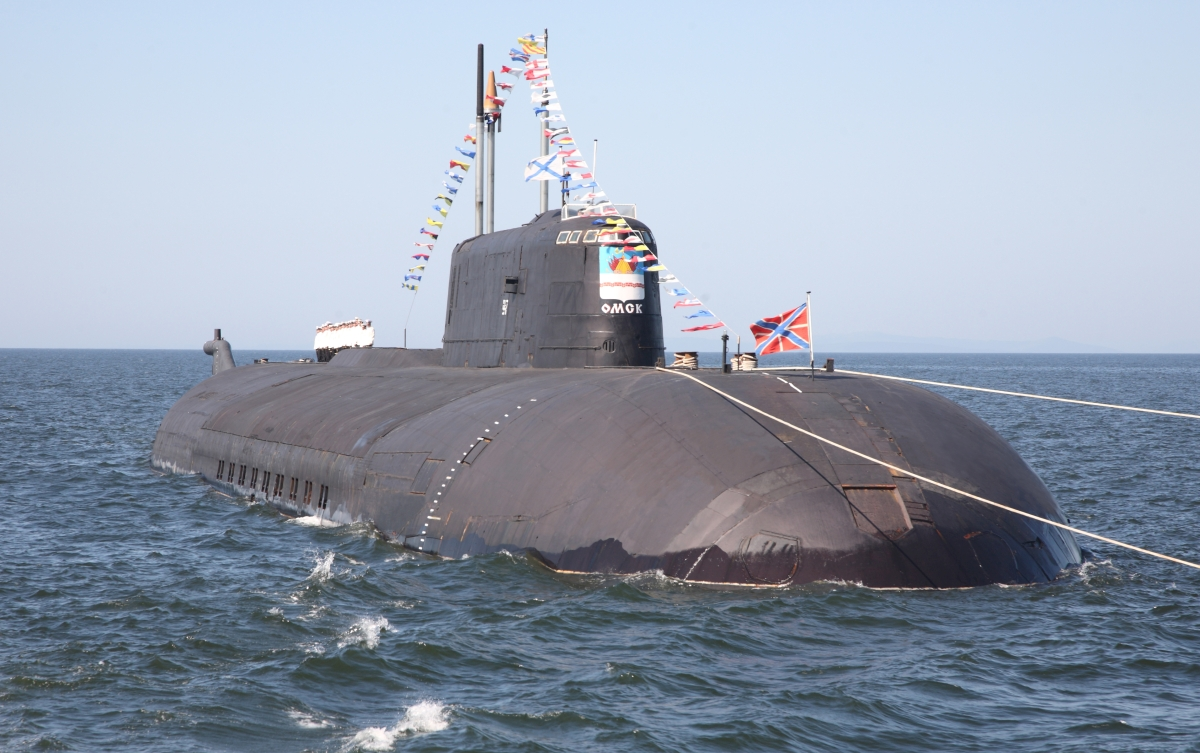
K-186 Omsk during 2008 Naval Parade in Vladivostok

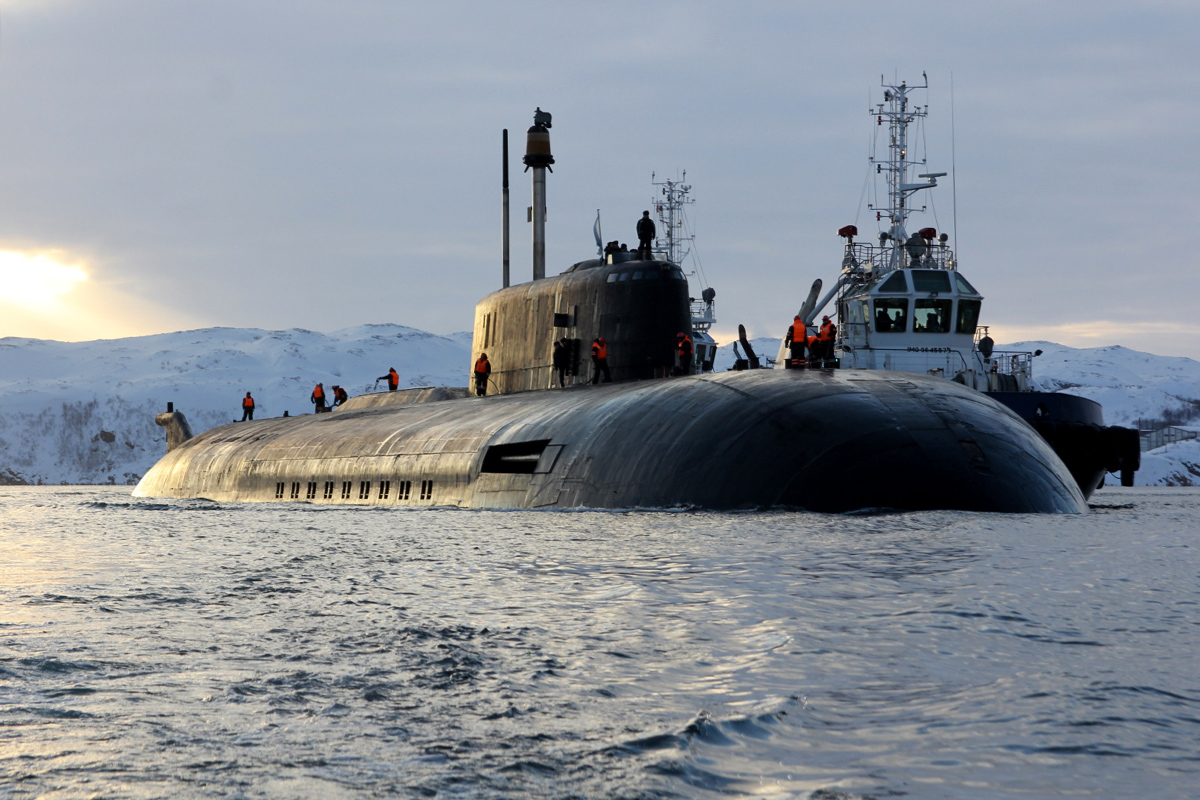
K-266 Orel after completion of its overhaul

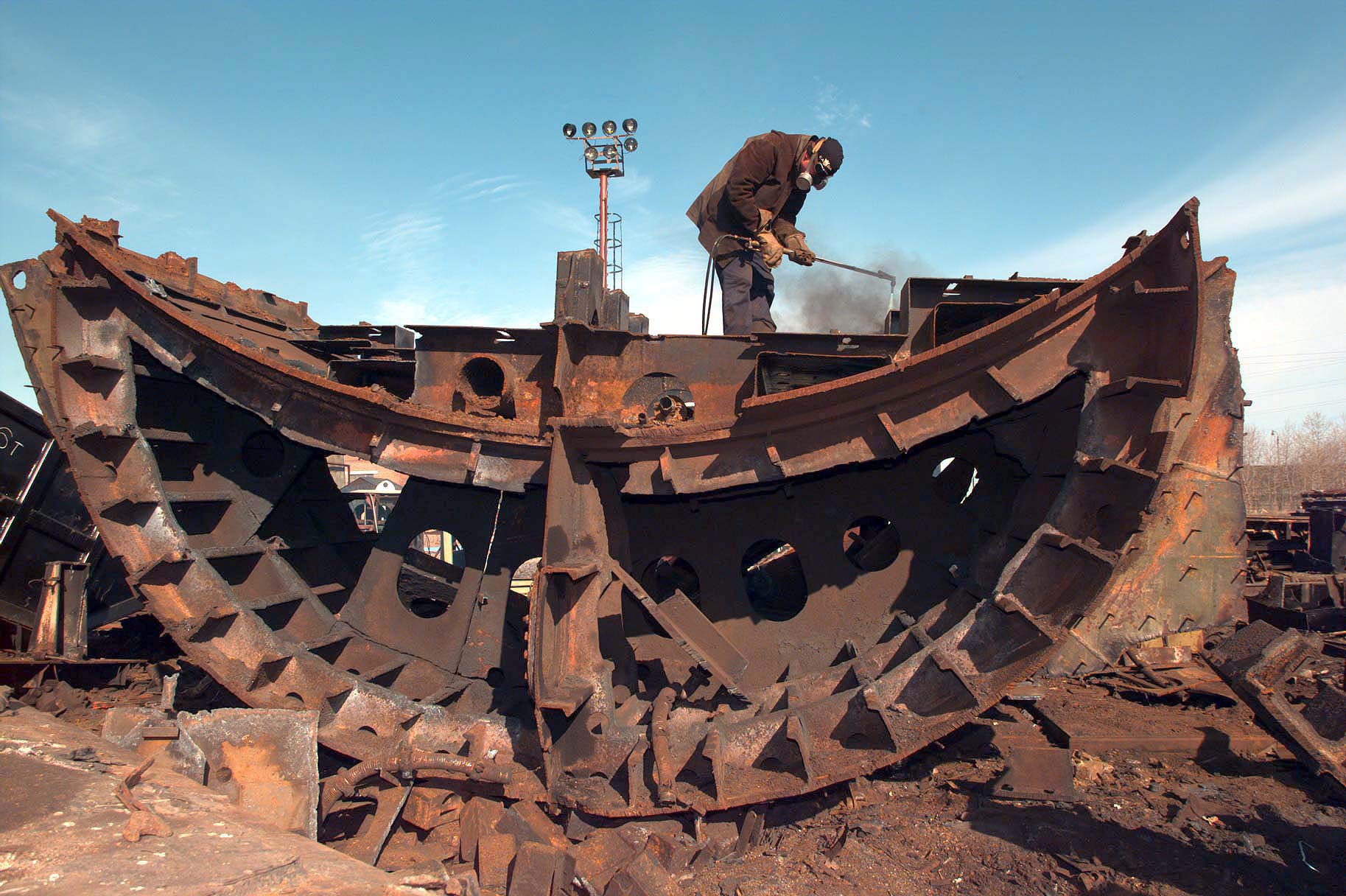
Disassembling of an Oscar-class submarine at the Zvezdochka shipyard in Severodvinsk, Russia

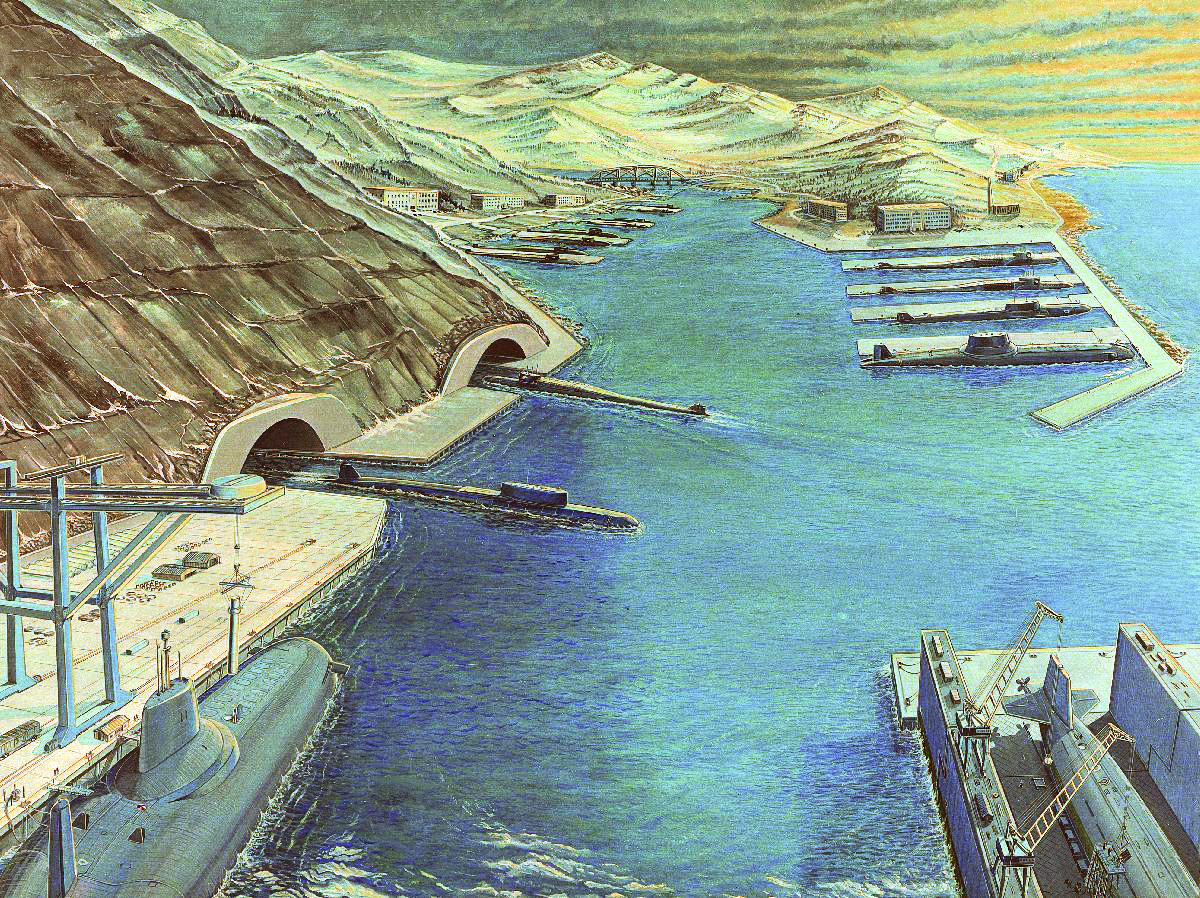
Artist impression of a Soviet ballistic missile submarine base during the 1980s

== See also ==
- List of submarine classes in service
