= Krasnodarsky (rural locality) =

Krasnodarsky (Russian: Краснода́рский; masculine), Krasnodarskaya (Краснода́рская; feminine), or Krasnodarskoye (Краснода́рское; neuter) is the name of several rural localities in Russia:

- Krasnodarsky, Krasnodar Krai, a khutor in Krasnoarmeysky District of Krasnodar Krai
- Krasnodarsky, Stavropol Krai, a khutor in Razdolnensky Selsoviet of Novoalexandrovsky District of Stavropol Krai
- Krasnodarskoye, a selo in Krasnodarsky Selsoviet of Ust-Pristansky District of Altai Krai
