= Vilyuchinsk =

Closed town in Kamchatka Krai, Russia

Vilyuchinsk Вилючинск
- Town
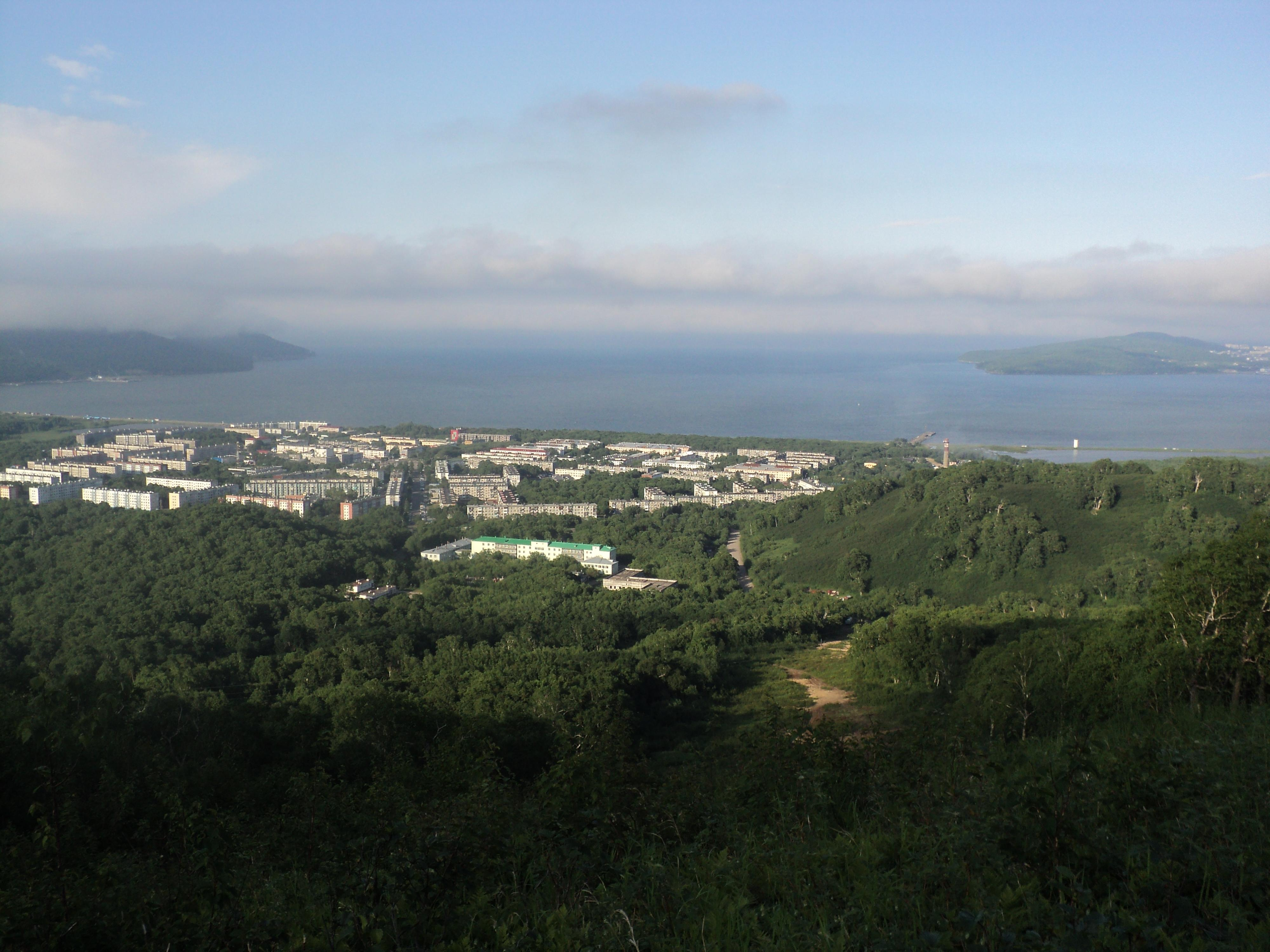

- Flag Coat of arms
- Interactive map of Vilyuchinsk
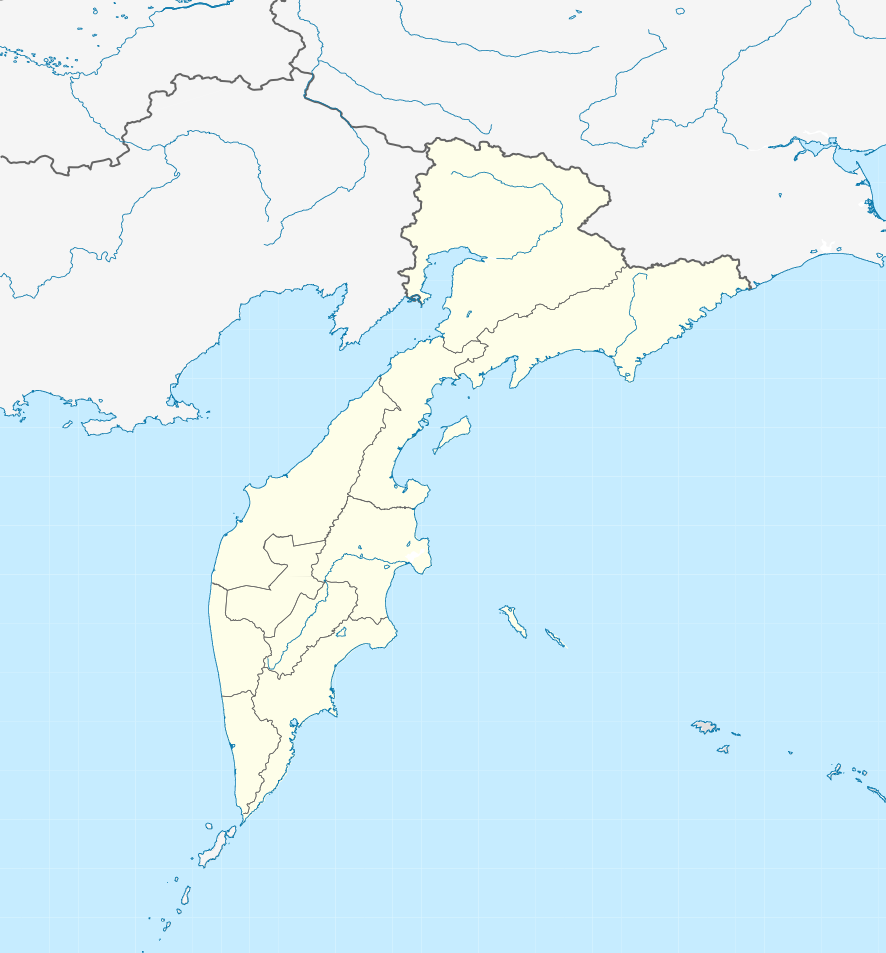
- Location of Vilyuchinsk Vilyuchinsk (Kamchatka Krai)
- Coordinates: 52°55′50″N 158°24′10″E
- Country: Russia
- Federal subject: Kamchatka Krai
- Founded: October 16, 1968

Government
  - Mayor: Alexey Sova
- Elevation: 10 m (33 ft)

Population (2010 Census)
  - Total: 22,905
  - Estimate (2023): 21,834 (−4.7%)

Administrative status
  - Subordinated to: Vilyuchinsk Town Under Krai Jurisdiction
  - Capital of: Vilyuchinsk Town Under Krai Jurisdiction

Municipal status
  - Urban okrug: Vilyuchinsky Urban Okrug
  - Capital of: Vilyuchinsky Urban Okrug
- Time zone: UTC+12 (MSK+9)
- Postal code: 684090–684093
- Dialing code: +7 41535
- OKTMO ID: 30735000001
- Website: www.viluchinsk-city.ru

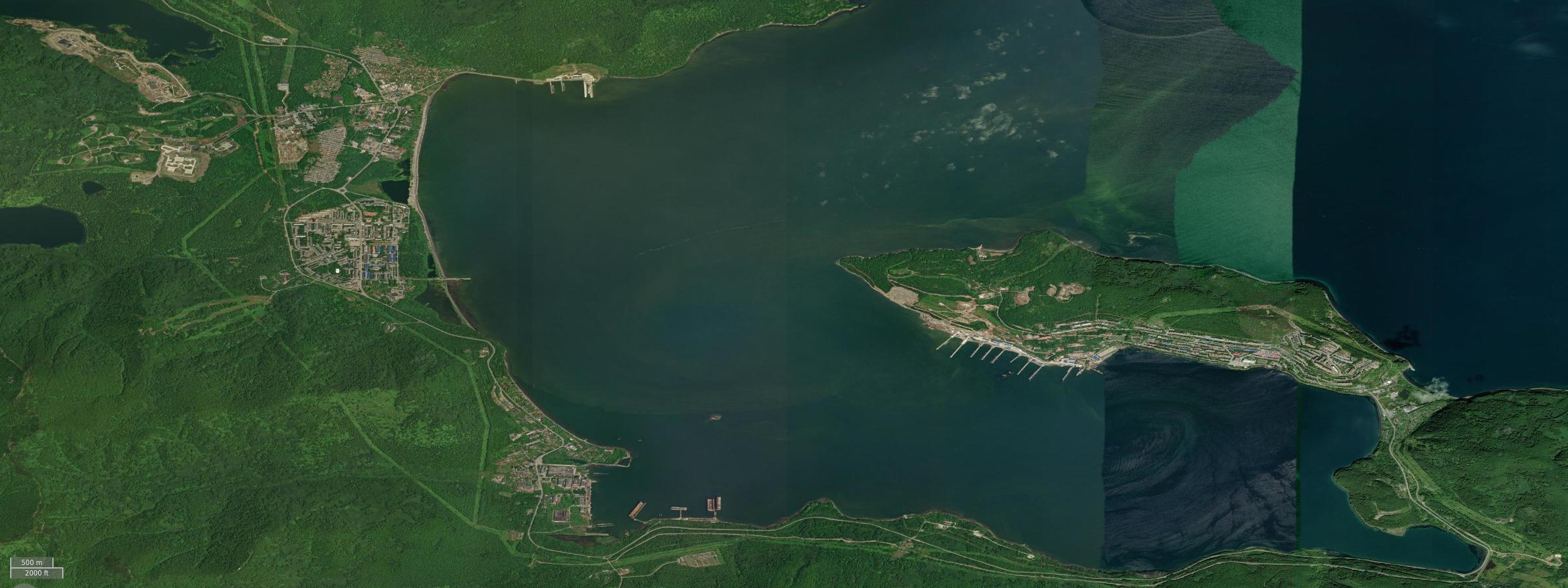
Satellite imagery of Vilyuchinsk prior to the 2025 Kamchatka Peninsula earthquake

Vilyuchinsk (Russian: Вилючинск) is a closed town in Kamchatka Krai, Russia, located on the Kamchatka Peninsula about 20 kilometers (12 mi) across Avacha Bay from Petropavlovsk-Kamchatsky. Population: 22,905 (2010 census); 24,166 (2002 census).

== History ==
It was founded as Sovetsky (Сове́тский) on October 16, 1968 through the amalgamation of three earlier settlements which supplied the Soviet Navy and served as a base for submarine construction: Rybachy, Primorsky, and Seldevaya. In 1970, as with other closed towns in the Soviet Union, it was given a code name based on the nearest major city, becoming known officially as Petropavlovsk-Kamchatsky-50 until 1994. In 1994, the town was renamed after the nearby volcano, Vilyuchik.

== Administrative and municipal status ==
Within the framework of administrative divisions, it is incorporated as Vilyuchinsk Town Under Krai Jurisdiction—an administrative unit with the status equal to that of the districts. As a municipal division, Vilyuchinsk Town Under Krai Jurisdiction is incorporated as Vilyuchinsky Urban Okrug.

== Economy ==
Besides the construction of nuclear submarines, the town's economy is largely reliant on fishing and the processing of fish. In the suburb of Rybachy, one of the three original settlements from which the town was created, a squadron of submarines of the Pacific Fleet has been based since August 1938. The local ship-repair industry began to develop in late 1959.

Despite plans for the navy base to be closed in 2003 due to a lack of finances, it has continued to operate. The base had been modernized in the late 2000s with newly constructed residential buildings, a hospital, a nursery school, and a sports center with a water park opened in 2007 personally by President Vladimir Putin.

== Religion ==
Two Russian Orthodox churches were built in the 1990s, the first in the town.
