= RPK-2 Vyuga =

RPK-2 Vyuga (NATO reporting name: SS-N-15 'Starfish')
- Mission profile
- Type: Anti-submarine/ship missile
- Place of origin: Soviet Union

Service history
- In service: 1969–current
- Used by: Russia

Production history
- Designed: 1960s

Specifications
- Warhead: ≥5 kt thermonuclear warhead or a Type 40 torpedo
- Warhead weight: 2445 kg
- Propellant: solid fuel rocket
- Operational range: 35–45 km (22–28 mi)
- Maximum speed: Mach 0.9
- Guidance system: Inertial guidance
- Launch platform: Akula, Oscar, Typhoon, Alfa, Delta, Kilo, Borei, Charlie

The RPK-2 Vyuga (Russian: РПК-2 Вьюга, blizzard; NATO reporting name: SS-N-15 Starfish), also designated as 81R, is a Soviet surface- or submarine-launched, nuclear-armed anti-submarine missile system, launched exclusively through 533-millimetre (21.0 in) torpedo tubes. The system was designed in Sverdlovsk, Russian SFSR in the 1960s.

Analogous to the SUBROC missile previously used by the US Navy, it is designed to be fired from a 533 mm torpedo tube. It is boosted by a choice of mechanisms depending on model before clearing the water, firing a solid fuel rocket and delivering its payload up to 45 kilometres (28 mi) away. The payload ranges from a simple depth charge to a 200 kt nuclear depth bomb.

== Design ==
The RPK-2 uses a 82R torpedo or 90R nuclear depth charge in the 533 mm version, and a 83R torpedo carrying or 86R nuclear depth charge in 650 mm version.

Both submarine- and surface-launched versions exist. The surface-launched versions are used by the Slava, Kirov, Neustrashimy and Udaloy classes. The submarine-launched versions are used by the Akula, Oscar, Typhoon, Delta, Kilo, and Borei classes. However, the munition package used in either is identical and hence the ship-launched version is launched into the water and submerges before firing its engines.The Charlie class submarines was also outfitted with the Starfish missile, with 5 being fired from INS Chakra during her service with the Indian Navy.

== Operators ==
Russia
Soviet Union
India

== See also ==
- Metel Anti-Ship Complex, predecessor
- RPK-6 Vodopad and RPK-7 Veter, successor
- 82R Vikhr (SUW-N-1)
- SMART
