= RPK-6 Vodopad/RPK-7 Veter =

Soviet anti-submarine missile

External videos
- SS-N-16 Stallion test launch on YouTube

RPK-6 Vodopad (Russian: РПК-6 Водопад, "waterfall") is a Soviet 533 mm anti-submarine missile deployed operationally since 1981.

RPK-7 Veter (Russian: РПК-7 Ветер, "wind") is a 650 mm version, deployed operationally since 1984.

Both missiles are given the same United States Navy designation SS-N-16 and NATO designation Stallion.

Both missiles are torpedo-tube launched, with a solid-fuel rocket engine to power them above the surface. They are dual-role and can be armed with either a 400 mm anti-submarine torpedo or a nuclear depth charge.

The Veter's increased range of approximately 100 kilometers was an impressive boost over its predecessor the RPK-2 Vyuga, which could only reach half the distance.

== Specifications (RPK-7 Veter) ==
Performance:

- Range: 100 km (55 nmi)

Payload:

- Nuclear depth charge or 400 mm torpedo

Guidance:

- inertial guidance

== Operators ==
Soviet Union

- Soviet Navy

Russia

- Russian Navy
