= P-700 Granit =

P-700 Granit (NATO reporting name: SS-N-19 'Shipwreck')
- Type: Long-range anti-ship cruise missile Surface or submarine launched
- Place of origin: Soviet Union/Russia

Service history
- In service: Since 1983
- Used by: Soviet Union, Russia

Production history
- Designer: OKB-52/NPO Mashinostroyeniya, Vladimir Chelomey
- Designed: 1970s
- Produced: 1985–1992

Specifications
- Mass: 7,000 kg (15,400 lb)
- Length: 10 m (33 ft)
- Diameter: 0.85 m (33 in)
- Warhead: High explosive or nuclear
- Warhead weight: 750 kg (1,653 lb)
- Blast yield: 500 kt
- Engine: turbojet and ramjet probable
- Operational range: 300 nmi (556 km)
- Maximum speed: Mach 1.6 (low altitude); Mach 2.5+ (high altitude)
- Guidance system: Inertial guidance, active radar homing with home-on-jam, and Legenda satellite targeting system (believed to be nonfunctional after the fall of the USSR)
- Launch platform: Oscar-class submarines Kirov-class battlecruiser & Kuznetsov-class aircraft carrier

The P-700 Granit (Russian: П-700 "Гранит"; English: granite) is a Soviet and Russian naval anti-ship cruise missile. Its GRAU designation is 3M45 and its NATO reporting name is SS-N-19 Shipwreck. It comes in surface-to-surface and submarine-launched variants, and can also be used against ground targets.

== Design and building ==
The P-700 was designed in the 1970s to replace the P-70 Ametist and P-120 Malakhit, both effective missiles but with too short a range in the face of improving weapons of U.S. Navy carrier battle groups. The missile was partially derived from the P-500 Bazalt.

Built by Chelomei/NPO Mashinostroenia, the bulging 10 m missile has swept-back wings and tail, weighs around 7,000 kilograms and can be fitted with either a 750 kg HE warhead, a FAE warhead, or a 500 kt thermonuclear warhead. A stubby cylindrical solid-fuel rocket is fitted to the rear for launch; this booster stage is released when the missile enters sustained flight. For many years it was believed that this missile used a turbojet engine during the sustained flight; after Russian and Western media gained access to its performance characteristics, it was understood that its propulsion system was a ramjet.

The P-700 has a distinctive annular air intake in the nose. Maximum speed is believed to be between Mach 1.6 and Mach 2.5. Range has been estimated at 400 km, 500 km, and 550–625 km. The guidance system is mixed-mode, with inertial guidance, terminal active radar homing guidance and also anti-radar homing. Mid-course correction is probable.

It is widely claimed that the missile, when fired in a swarm (group of 4–8) has a unique guidance mode. One of the weapons climbs to a higher altitude and designates targets while the others attack. The missile responsible for target designation climbs in short pop-ups, so as to be harder to intercept. The missiles are linked by data connections, forming a network. If the designating missile is destroyed the next missile will rise to assume its purpose. Missiles are able to differentiate targets, detect groups and prioritize targets automatically using information gathered during flight and types of ships and battle formations pre-programmed in an onboard computer. They will attack targets in order of priority, highest to lowest: after destroying the first target, any remaining missiles will attack the next prioritized target.Such description received some doubts. The missile has a means of countering the attacking anti-missiles. Also, the on-board computer carries data designed to counter an enemy's electronic warfare and to evade counter-measures.

The P-700 was derived from the P-500 Bazalt missile with a turbojet. The P-700 was in turn developed into the P-800 Oniks, which uses ramjet propulsion, and the BrahMos missile, a joint Indian/Russian modernization of the P-800.

== Deployment ==
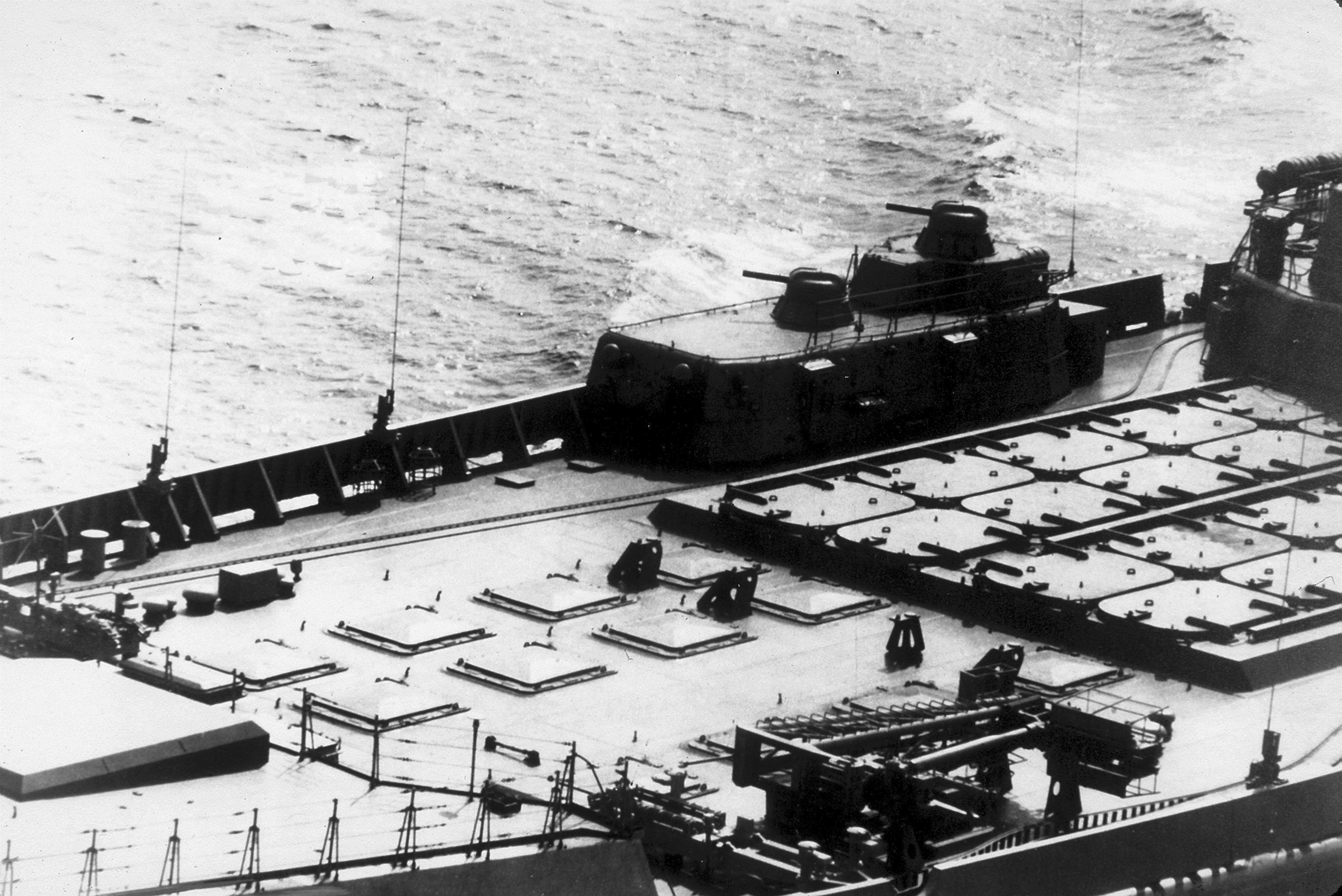
SS-N-19 launchers on the Kirov-class battlecruiser Frunze.

Initial deployment was aboard the cruiser Kirov (now the Admiral Ushakov) in 1980 and the missile entered service on 19 July 1983.

Unusually for an aircraft carrier, the Kuznetsov-class also carried 12 Granit launchers. This gave the Admiral Kuznetsov an additional primary attack capability, but also had the political advantage of classing the vessel as an aircraft cruiser instead. (Note: See Montreux Convention Regarding the Regime of the Straits § Aircraft carriers) Unconfirmed reports say that the missiles were removed in 2000, to provide more aircraft hangar space.

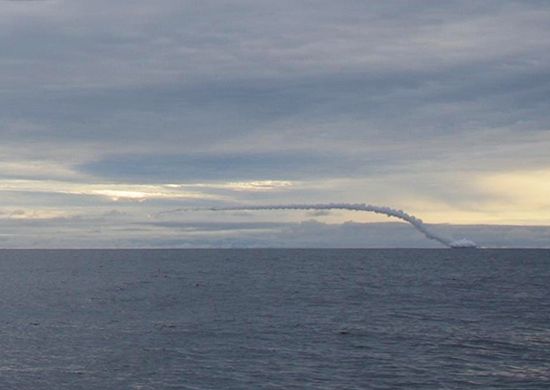
Launch of P-700 Granit from K-410 Smolensk, 2016

It is currently in service with the Russian Northern Fleet on the Kirov-class battlecruisers Admiral Nakhimov and Pyotr Velikyi, and with the Russian Northern and Pacific fleets as the main weapon of the Oscar-class cruise missile submarines.

The Kursk carried 24 missiles when it sank following a torpedo explosion during an exercise on 12 August 2000. The Russian navy was extremely concerned about possible NATO attempts to recover a missile and guarded the site of the wreck throughout the recovery effort. The missiles were recovered intact following a $65 million salvage operation.

The size of the missile limits the platforms on which it can operate and be launched from. It has only been deployed from Oscar-class submarines, Kirov-class battlecruisers, and the Admiral Kuznetsov aircraft carrier. Ships of all three types will have their Granit missiles replaced with new launch cells to carry smaller Oniks and Kalibr cruise missiles in greater numbers.

== P-1000 Vulkan deployment ==
The P-1000 missile was partially derived from the P-500 and P-700. Its maximum speed is claimed to be between Mach 1.5 - Mach 2.5 depending on altitude, and its range is claimed to be between 700 and 1000 km (800). Warhead: 500 kg. Years of production 1985–1992. The body of the missile resembles that of the P-500, but it has the ability of the P-700 to overcome defensive countermeasures. Long range missile can achieve the target only at low altitudes (up to 25 meters or lower) approximation (in which case the maximum range is less than 500 km).

=== Substitution in 2018 ===
Starting in 2018, the P-700 is planned to be replaced by the Zircon (missile).

== Operators ==
Current operator

- Russia
  - Russian Navy

Former operators

- Soviet Union
  - Soviet Navy

== See also ==
- List of missiles
- List of NATO reporting names for surface-to-surface missiles
