= JL-1 =

Submarine-launched ballistic missile

Julang-1 (JL-1), NATO : CSS-N-3
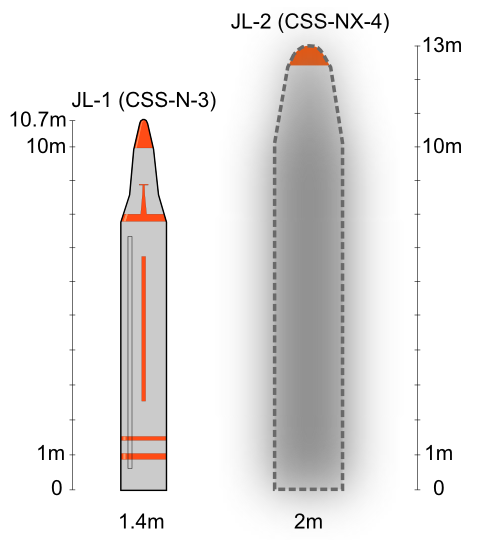
- JL-1 and JL-2.
- Type: SLBM

Service history
- Used by: China

Production history
- Designer: Huang Weilu
- Designed: 1970s
- Manufacturer: Factory 307 (Nanjing Dawn Group)
- Produced: 1980s

Specifications
- Mass: 14,700 kilograms (32,400 lb)
- Length: 10.7 metres (35 ft)
- Width: 1.4 metres (4.6 ft)
- Warhead: nuclear
- Blast yield: 250-500Kt
- Propellant: Solid fuel
- Operational range: 1,770 km (JL-1), 2,500 km (JL-1A)
- Guidance system: Inertial
- Launch platform: Xia class submarine

The Julang-1 (Chinese: 巨浪-1; pinyin: Jù Làng Yī; lit. 'Huge Wave-1', also known as the JL-1; NATO reporting name CSS-N-3) was China's first generation nuclear submarine-launched ballistic missile (SLBM). The JL-1 and its warheads are believed to be retired and dismantled.

== History ==
On 26 March 1967, the National Defense Science and Technology Commission began working on the SLBM JL-1 (Julang, "Great Wave"). The Ninth Academy simultaneously conceptualized a smaller thermonuclear warhead for the missile. In 1970, the Ninth Academy completed a theoretical design for the thermonuclear warhead.

The general designer of the missile was Huang Weilu, and Chen Deren (Chinese: 陈德仁, 1922 – 21 December 2007) served as his deputy. The missile was assembled at Factory 307 (now Nanjing Dawn Group [南京晨光集团]).

The JL-1 was deployed on Xia class submarine in 1986. The Type 092 Xia class nuclear submarine has 12 launch tubes.

The JL-1 was initially tested and deployed on the PLAN's modified Golf class SSB. The Golf has since been modified again for further testing of other missiles, such as the JL-2, which has test-launched multiple times with varying levels of success.

The DF-21 appears to be a land-based version of the JL-1.

A 2011 US Department of Defense described the operational status of the JL-1 as "questionable". As of 2018, the JL-1 and its warheads are believed to have been retired and dismantled.

== See also ==
- JL-2 – (China)
- R-29 Vysota – (Soviet Union)
- R-29RM Shtil – (Soviet Union)
- R-29RMU Sineva – (Russia)
- R-29RMU2 Layner – (Russia)
- RSM-56 Bulava – (Russia)
- UGM-133 Trident II – (United States)
- M45 (missile) – (France)
- M51 (missile) – (France)
- K Missile family – (India)
- Pukguksong-1 – (North Korea)
- R-39 Rif – (Soviet Union)
- R-39M – (Russia)
