= SS-N-23 =

NATO reporting name SS-N-23 Skiff can refer to:

- R-29RM Shtil Soviet missile (most commonly)
- R-29RMU Sineva Russian missile
- R-29 Vysota missile family
