= Russian submarine Ekaterinburg =

Russian submarine

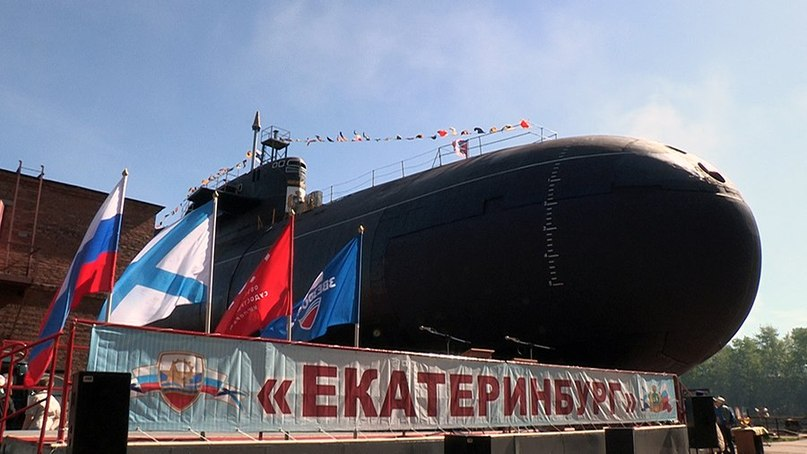
- K-84 Ekaterinburg at Zvezdochka, summer 2014

History

Soviet Union, Russia
- Name: K-84 Ekaterinburg
- Namesake: City of Yekaterinburg
- Builder: Northern Machinebuilding Enterprise (Sevmash)
- Laid down: 17 February 1982
- Commissioned: 30 December 1985
- Status: Inactive, to be decommissioned

General characteristics
- Class & type: Delta IV-class submarine
- Displacement: 11,740 tons (surface); 18,200 tons (submerged)
- Length: 167.4 m (549 ft 3 in)
- Beam: 11.7 m (38 ft 5 in)
- Draft: 8.8 m (28 ft 10 in)
- Propulsion: Two VM4-SG nuclear reactors
- Speed: 14 knots (26 km/h; 16 mph) (surface); 24 knots (44 km/h; 28 mph) (submerged)
- Endurance: 90 days
- Complement: 140 officers and men
- Armament: 16 × R-29RM Shtil or R-29RMU Sineva nuclear ballistic missiles; 4 × 533 mm torpedo tubes; 12 × torpedoes

K-84 Ekaterinburg (Russian: К-84 Екатеринбург) is a Project 667BDRM Delfin-class (NATO reporting name: Delta IV) nuclear-powered ballistic missile submarine. The submarine was laid down on 17 February 1982 at the Russian Northern Machine-Building Enterprise (Sevmash). It was commissioned into the Soviet Navy on 30 December 1985. After the collapse of the Soviet Union, the submarine continued to serve in the Russian Navy. Initially known only by its hull number, in February 1999 it was renamed after the city of Yekaterinburg.

== Construction ==
Construction of the nuclear submarine Ekaterinburg (K-84) began at the Northern Machinebuilding Enterprise (Sevmash) in Severodvinsk on 17 February 1982, before being commissioned into the Soviet Navy on 30 December 1985. It was the second of the seven-boat Project 667BDRM Delfin class, which was developed at the Rubin Design Bureau in September 1975. A ballistic missile submarine, it was designed primarily to carry up to 16 R-29RM Shtil (NATO designation: SS-N-23 Skiff) SLBM for use against military and industrial facilities in the case of a nuclear war. Each Shtil missile carries ten 100 kt multiple independently targeted reentry vehicles, and has a circular error probable of 500 metres (1,600 ft). It is also equipped with RPK-7 Veter (NATO designation: SS-N-16 Stallion) anti-ship missiles for use against large surface vessels, and self-defense torpedoes.

== Operational history ==
After commissioning, Ekaterinburg was deployed to the base at Olenya Bay, and during the second half of 1986 underwent acoustic trials. In August 1989, Ekaterinburg conducted a failed launch of all its missiles under Operation Behemoth. Four months later, in December 1989, it was the first submarine to attempt to launch all its missiles while underwater; the first launch was successful, though the second was not. In 1993, it was transferred to the base at Sayda-Guba. On 3 December 1996, Ekaterinburg entered the Zvezdochka shipyard in Severodvinsk for an overhaul, though work did not begin until March 1998. It re-entered service in 2003, based in Yagelnaya Bay. It test-fired R-29RMU Sineva missiles in December 2003 and June 2004, and during Northern Fleet exercises in August 2005 fired missiles at the Kamchatka range. Also in 2005, Ekaterinburg was awarded the Navy Commander's Prize for its missile launches. In 2006, it successfully fired missiles at the Chizha test range from the North Pole. On 20 May 2011, the boat fired the first R-29RMU2 Liner SLBM, aimed at the Kura Test Range.

In 2020, its weapons were removed as it was prepared for decommissioning. In 2021 it was reported that it would be decommissioned in 2022.

=== Drydock fire incident ===
On 29 December 2011 around 12:20 UTC, Ekaterinburg caught fire while in the floating drydock PD-50 in Murmansk, and after several hours of firefighting efforts, it was partially sunk in an effort to control the fire. Initial statements from Russian authorities indicate there were no injuries or radiation leakage, and that the vessel was not carrying any weapons as it was drydocked for repairs. The fire apparently began when sparks from welding being done on the boat's hull ignited wooden scaffolding around the ship, then spread to the flammable rubber coating covering the hull. Russian President Dmitry Medvedev ordered the repair of the submarine and a thorough investigation of the incident on 30 December 2011. The boat's hydroacoustic system was disabled in the fire. Some sources speculated that the submarine's pressure hull suffered possible structural damage due to the intense heat; the temperature inside the torpedo room allegedly rose to 60-70 °C.

A commission was to study the damage to the submarine and determine whether it was economical to repair it. A Zvezdochka shipyard spokesperson said that the repairs would take more than a year.

On 12 January 2012 ITAR-TASS reported that the repair of the submarine would take three to four years. The repair would be combined with a scheduled refit that was to start in 2013. As it would be some months before the submarine can be transferred to the shipyard due to winter sea ice, the repairs would begin in May–June, 2012, so the submarine would not be expected to return to service before 2015.

On 14 February 2012, Vlast reported that the submarine had been carrying 16 R-29RM Shtil (NATO designation SS-N-23 Skiff) SLBMs, armed with four nuclear warheads in each missile, at the time of the fire, though officials had said at the time of the fire that no nuclear weapons were on board, as they had been unloaded before the fire broke out. According to Vlast, the presence of nuclear weapons on the burning vessel would have meant that “Russia, for a day, was on the brink of the biggest catastrophe since the time of Chernobyl.” However, according to Russia's Deputy Prime Minister Dmitry Rogozin, the nuclear weapons had not been unloaded before the repair work started.

The submarine was handed over to the fleet after repair on 19 December 2014. Damage from the fire on the submarine exceeded a billion rubles.
