= R-29RMU2 Lajner =

Submarine-launched ballistic missile

R-29RMU2.1 Lajner
- Type: SLBM
- Place of origin: Russia

Service history
- In service: 2014–present
- Used by: Russian Navy

Production history
- Designer: Makeyev Rocket Design Bureau
- Manufacturer: Krasnoyarsk Machine-Building Plant

Specifications
- Mass: 40 tons
- Length: 15 m
- Diameter: 1.9 m
- Warhead: 4 × 500kt or 12 × 100kt multiple thermonuclear warheads
- Engine: Three-stage liquid-propellant rocket
- Operational range: 8,300-11,000 km
- Guidance system: Astroinertial with GLONASS
- Accuracy: 250 m

The R-29RMU2.1 Lajner (Russian: Р-29РМУ2.1 "Лайнер" meaning Liner as in airliner or ocean liner) with NATO reporting name SS-NX-31 / SS-N-31 is a Russian liquid-fuelled submarine-launched ballistic missile (SLBM) and the newest member of the R-29 missile family, developed by the Makeyev Rocket Design Bureau and produced by the Krasnoyarsk Machine-Building Plant. Derived from the R-29RMU2 Sineva SLBM, the Lajner can carry twelve nuclear warheads, three times as many as Sineva. It was expected to enter service with the Russian Navy's Delta IV-class submarines after a successful test programme that spanned from May to September 2011. The Russian Navy confirmed in 2014 that the system was now in use.

== History and design ==
On 9 August 2011, the Russian Ministry of Defense disclosed the details of the Lajner SLBM, whose first launch occurred on 20 May earlier that year. The authorities originally claimed the launch to be of a Sineva missile, but on 23 May 2011 it was revealed that the missile fired was actually the Lajner. The successful firing, aimed at the Kura Test Range, was conducted from the submarine K-84 Ekaterinburg.

K-114 Tula, one of the seven Delta IV-class submarines of the Russian Navy, launched the second Lajner in September 2011.

The second launch of the Lajner missile took place on 29 September 2011 from the submarine K-114 Tula in the Barents Sea aimed at the Kura Test Range. Following the second successful Lajner test, the Russian Navy decided to accept the missile into active service to augment the RSM-56 Bulava missile and improve the future viability of the Delta IV-class submarines until at least 2030. Development work on the missile was completed by late February 2012. Missile was recommended by the State Commission for adoption as of December 2012. Missile weapons complex D-29RMU2.1 with missile R-29RMU2.1 accepted for service by decree of the President of the Russian Federation in January 2014.

The Lajner missile is a highly advanced derivative of the three-stage liquid-propelled R-29RMU2 Sineva SLBM, which was accepted into service in 2007. While many technical details are not disclosed, it is known that the missile is capable of carrying up to twelve low-yield nuclear warheads called MIRVs capable of striking several targets individually. This is twice the number of warheads the solid-propellant RSM-56 Bulava SLBM can carry, and, unlike those of the Sineva SLBM, these warheads can be of a mixed set with various yields. While it shares flight characteristics with the Sineva, the Lajner is equipped with improved systems to overcome anti-ballistic missile shields. The missile can carry twelve low-yield warheads without penetration aids, ten low-yield warheads with penetration aids, eight low-yield warheads with enhanced penetration aids, or four medium-yield warheads with penetration aids.

== Operators ==
Russia

- Russian Navy

== See also ==
- R-29 missile family – (Soviet Union)
- R-39 – (Soviet Union)
- R-39M – (Russia)
- RSM-56 Bulava – (Russia)
- UGM-133 Trident II – (United States)
- M45 (missile) – (France)
- M51 (missile) – (France)
- JL-3 – (China)
- K-6 – (India)
- Pukguksong-6 – (North Korea)
