= UFO sightings in Norway =

This article is a list of UFO sightings that were reported in Norway.

== 1986 ==
On the evening of 13 July 1986, a married couple at a mountain farm near Torpo, along with their son and some friends, witnessed a pair of bright objects in the sky, the first of which was allegedly moving dramatically, flashing, and releasing sparks. The husband captured film of the incident, which was later analyzed by the ufological organization Ground Saucer Watch (GSW). They stated that there was no evidence of a hoax; however, they suggested the apparent motion of the objects could be attributable to camera movement and also highlighted the lack of reference points in the photos or videotape. They were unable to give a conclusive answer on the nature of the objects. Other experts suggested the bright objects were actually the planet Jupiter and the star Arcturus.

== 2006 ==
On the evening of 21 August 2006, a strange light phenomenon was reported by multiple witnesses in the sky over northern Norway, from Finnsnes in Troms, to Bodø in Nordland. A bright, green, shining orb was traveling at fantastic speed in the night sky, the police were contacted by various eyewitnesses who observed the object, and extensive speculation followed. The next day, the phenomenon was suggested to have been a bolide.

== 2009 ==
On 9 December 2009, a bluish spiraling light was seen, filmed, and photographed over Norway. Jonathan McDowell, a Harvard astrophysicist, suggested that the light and spiral were caused by a failed Bulava missile test from a submarine deployed by the Russian Federation.

== See also ==
- List of reported UFO sightings
