= Russian ship Vladimir Monomakh =

At least two ships of the Imperial Russian, Soviet or Russian Navy have been named Vladimir Monomakh after Vladimir II Monomakh.

- Russian cruiser Vladimir Monomakh - Armoured cruiser launched in 1882 and sunk at the Battle of Tsushima in 1905.
- Russian submarine Vladimir Monomakh - a Borei-class submarine launched in 2012.
