= R-29RM =

Russian ballistic missile

R-29RM / RSM-54
- Type: SLBM

Service history
- In service: 1986–2010
- Used by: Soviet Navy; Russian Navy

Production history
- Designer: Makeyev Rocket Design Bureau
- Manufacturer: Krasnoyarsk Machine-Building Plant

Specifications
- Mass: 40.3 tonnes
- Length: 14.8 metres
- Diameter: 1.9 m
- Warhead: The payload (2800 kg) was capable of carrying ten 100 kT yield MIRV warheads, though only a four MIRV warhead version entered production.
- Blast yield: 200 kt each
- Engine: Three-stage liquid fueled stages using N_{2}O_{4}/UDMH propellant
- Operational range: 8,300 kilometres (5,200 mi)
- Guidance system: Astroinertial
- Accuracy: CEP 500 metres

The R-29RM (Russian: Р-29РМ, NATO reporting name SS-N-23 Skiff) was a liquid propellant, submarine-launched ballistic missile in use by the Russian Navy. It had the alternate Russian designations RSM-54 and GRAU index 3M27. It was designed to be launched from the Delta IV submarine, each of which is capable of carrying 16 missiles. The R-29RM could carry four 100 kiloton warheads and had a range of about 8,500 kilometres (5,300 mi). They were replaced with the newer R-29RMU2 Sineva and later with the enhanced variant R-29RMU2.1 Layner.

== History ==
=== Development ===
Development of the R-29RM started in 1979 at the Makeyev Rocket Design Bureau. The navy accepted the armament in 1986 and subsequently installed the D-9RM launch system consisting of a cluster of 16 R-29RM on board the nuclear-propelled Project 667BDRM submarines.

=== Operation Behemoth ===
On 6 August 1991 at 21:09, K-407 Novomoskovsk, under the command of Captain Second Rank Sergey Yegorov, became the world's only submarine to successfully launch an all-missile salvo, launching 16 R-29RM (RSM-54) ballistic missiles of the total weight of almost 700 tons in 244 seconds (operation code name "Behemoth-2"). All the missile hit their designated targets at the Kura Missile Test Range in Kamchatka.

=== Space launch vehicle ===
Several R-29RM were retrofitted as Shtil' carrier rockets to be launched by Delta-class submarines, the submarines being mobile can send a payload directly into a heliosynchronous orbit, notably used by imaging satellites. Outside the confines of the Russian military, this capability has been used commercially to place three out of four microsatellites into a low Earth orbit with one cancellation assigned to the Baikonur Cosmodrome for better financial terms.

=== End of service ===
The last boat carrying R-29RM, K-51 Verkhoturye, went into refit to be rearmed with the newer R-29RMU Sineva on 23 August 2010.

== Operators ==
=== Former operators ===
Russia

- Russian Navy (1992-2010)

Soviet Union

- Soviet Navy (1986-1991)

== See also ==
- R-29 Vysota – (Soviet Union)
- R-29RMU Sineva – (Russia)
- R-29RMU2 Layner – (Russia)
- RSM-56 Bulava – (Russia)
- UGM-133 Trident II – (United States)
- M51 (missile) – (France)
- JL-3 – (China)
- K-6 – (India)
- Pukguksong-6 – (North Korea)
- R-39 Rif – (Soviet Union)
- R-39M – (Russia)
