= Russian submarine Generalissimus Suvorov =

2022 Borei-class submarine

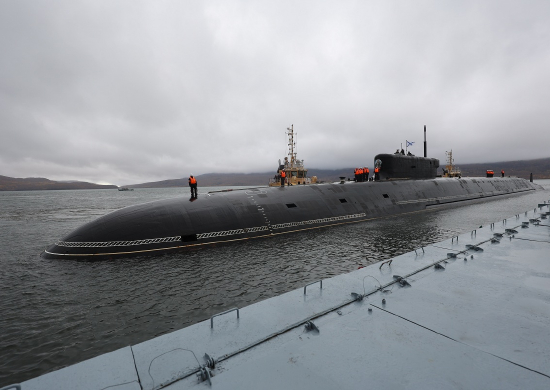
- Generalissimus Suvorov in 2023

History

Russia
- Name: Generalissimus Suvorov
- Namesake: Alexander Suvorov
- Builder: Sevmash
- Laid down: 26 December 2014
- Launched: 11 January 2022
- Commissioned: 29 December 2022
- Home port: Vilyuchinsk
- Status: Active

General characteristics
- Type: Borei-class submarine
- Displacement: 14,720 t (14,488 long tons) surfaced; 24,000 t (23,621 long tons) submerged
- Length: 170 m (557 ft 9 in)
- Beam: 13.5 m (44 ft 3 in)
- Draught: 10 m (32 ft 10 in)
- Propulsion: 1 × OK-650B nuclear reactor; 1 × AEU steam turbine; 1 shaft
- Speed: 25 knots (46 km/h)
- Complement: 130 officers and sailors
- Armament: 16 × R-30 Bulava SLBMs; 6 × 21 in (533 mm) torpedo tubes to fire a variety of appropriately sized weapons

Generalissimus Suvorov (Russian: РПКСН Генералиссимус Суворов) is a Borei-class (Project 955A) nuclear-powered ballistic missile submarine developed by the Rubin Design Bureau and constructed by the Sevmash for the Russian Navy. The submarine is named after Alexander Suvorov.

== Construction and career ==
The submarine was laid down on 26 December 2014. At the end of 2015, the hull of the submarine was finished. It was taken out of the workshop on 25 December 2021 and launched on 11 January 2022. She started sea trials on 20 July 2022.

On 25 October 2022, the first photo of Generalissimus Suvorov on trials was published.

On 1 November 2022, she was being prepared for commissioning and on November 3 launched a Bulava ballistic missile from a submerged position during trials in the White Sea. The missile successfully hit a target at the Kura Missile Test Range on the Kamchatka Peninsula. On 7 November, all trials were finished.

She was commissioned on 29 December 2022. As of early 2023, the submarine was reported operating out of Severomorsk in the Northern Fleet operational area where her crew was continuing training. Upon completion of the training, she was reportedly started her transfer to the Pacific Fleet in August 2023 which was completed on 16 October 2023. In October 2026, it was reported that the submarine had test-fired a Bulava submarine-launched ballistic missile (SLBM) from the Sea of Okhotsk toward the Chizha test range in Russia’s Arkhangelsk Region.
