= Russian submarine Tula =

Russian Delta-IV-class submarine

- K-114 Tula at a pier of the Russian Northern Fleet's naval base in the town of Gadzhiyevo, Murmansk Oblast

History

Soviet Union, Russia
- Name: K-114 Tula
- Namesake: City of Tula, Russia
- Builder: Northern Engineering Plant (Sevmash)
- Laid down: 22 February 1984
- Launched: 22 January 1987
- Commissioned: 30 October 1987
- In service: 1987–199?, 2006–2014, 2017-present
- Home port: Gadzhiyevo, Murmansk Oblast
- Status: Active

General characteristics
- Class & type: Delta IV-class submarine SSBN
- Displacement: 11,740 tons (surfaced); 18,200 tons (submerged)
- Length: 167.4 m (549 ft 3 in) (on design waterline)
- Beam: 11.7 m (38 ft 5 in)
- Draught: 8.8 m (28 ft 10 in)
- Propulsion: 2 WM-4 pressurized-water reactors, 90 MW each; 2 GT3A-365 steam turbines, 20,000 hp (15,000 kW) each
- Speed: 14 knots (26 km/h; 16 mph) (surfaced); 24 knots (44 km/h; 28 mph) (submerged)
- Endurance: 90 days
- Test depth: 400 m (1,300 ft)
- Complement: 135 men
- Sensors & processing systems: "Snoop Tray" surface search radar, "Mouse Roar" active attack sonar, "Shark Hide" flank array sonar, "Pelamida" towed array sonar
- Armament: 16 x R-29RM Shtil or R-29RMU Sineva nuclear ballistic missiles, RPK-7 Veter anti-ship missiles, 4 x 533-mm bow tubes for up to 18 torpedoes

K-114 Tula (К-114 Тула) is a Russian Project 667BDRM Delfin-class (NATO reporting name: Delta IV) nuclear-powered ballistic missile submarine (SSBN). As such, she carries a complement of R-29RM Shtil and R-29RMU Sineva nuclear submarine-launched ballistic missiles (SLBM) as her primary deterrent mission, along with anti-ship missiles and torpedoes, the latter for self-defense. Built in Severodvinsk during the late 1980s, she served with the Soviet Navy before being transferred to the Russian Navy following the dissolution of the Soviet Union. Tula underwent an extensive overhaul during 2000–2004 and was fitted with upgraded Shtil SLBMs, several of which were launched from her during her later operational life. She was sponsored by the city of Tula, and is homeported in Gadzhiyevo.

== Construction ==
Construction of the nuclear submarine Tula (K-114) began at the Northern Machinebuilding Enterprise (Sevmash) in Severodvinsk on 22 February 1984, before being commissioned into the Soviet Navy on 30 October 1987. She was the fourth of the seven-boat Project 667BDRM Delfin class, which was developed at the Rubin Design Bureau in September 1975. A ballistic missile submarine, she was designed primarily to carry up to 16 R-29RM Shtil (NATO designation: SS-N-23 Skiff) SLBM for use against military and industrial facilities in the case of a nuclear war. Each Shtil missile carries ten 100 kt multiple independently targeted reentry vehicles, and has a circular error probable of 500 metres (1,600 ft). She is also equipped with RPK-7 Veter (NATO designation: SS-N-16 Stallion) anti-ship missile for use against enemy submarines, and self-defense torpedoes.

Line drawing

Line drawing showing the starboard side of K-114 Tula. The white cheatline marks the boat's waterline.

== Operational history ==
Locations of importance for K-114 Tula

Due to her nature as an SSBN, and like most submarines, the operation of Tula is mostly classified. During 1987–1988, the boat conducted seven patrols, including five in the Arctic, 17 combat duties, and firing of twelve missiles. In October 1990, Soviet Deputy Minister of Defense General V. M. Kochetov visited Tula; this happened shortly before the collapse of the Soviet Union, when the boat was transferred to the Russian Navy. Until 2000, she logged 134,856 miles (217,030 km) in total distance travelled, 77,245 miles (124,314 km) of which was submerged.

From June 2000 until 21 April 2004, Tula underwent overhaul at the Zvezdochka shipyard, Severodvinsk, the third boat after Verkhoturie (K-51) and Ekaterinburg (K-84). The overhaul extended her service life by ten years, and allowed her to carry R-29RMU Sineva missiles. She conducted sea trials in early 2006 and re-entered service shortly thereafter, despite plans to do so in 2005. Tula's post-overhaul operational history is characterised by a number of missile launches, the first of which occurred on 17 December 2007, when she launched a Sineva missile aimed at the Kura Test Range in the Kamchatka Peninsula. Within eight days, Tula launched another missile, again aimed at Kura; both tests were successful.

The successful launch recorded a distance of 11,547 kilometres. This is the best result ever achieved using this [R-29RM Sineva] ballistic missile.

— Russian President Dmitry Medvedev

Another four launches took place during 2008–2011, mostly from the Barents Sea. On 11 October 2008, Tula launched a Sineva while submerged. The missile reached the equatorial Pacific region after having flown for 11,547 kilometres (7,175 mi), a record for the missile. The launch was part of the bigger "Stabilnost 2008" exercise, which comprised eight surface ships, five submarines, 11 aircraft and 5,000 sailors. Tula launched the Sineva again on 4 March 2010 after an unremarkable 2009. The test was successful, as was another launch of two more missiles, on 6 August 2010, aimed at the Kura Test Range. On 29 September 2011, Tula conducted the latest launch of the Sineva missile aimed at Kura from the Barents Sea. Tula received a second major overhaul in 2014 by the Ship Repair Center Zvezdochka and returned to active service in December 2017. In 2022 during the Russian invasion of Ukraine, the submarine participated in nuclear exercises together with other elements of Russian nuclear triad forces.

Recent footage of the Tula shows that it has been fitted with slat armor to prevent drone strikes, the first ocean going asset to carry such a modification. The submarine was again reported active as of 2025.
