= Arcturus-class submarine =

Future Russian ballistic missile submarine class

The Arcturus class is a planned future replacement for the Russian Borei class of ballistic missile submarines. It was announced in 2022 and is designed by Rubin Design Bureau.

At the Army-2022 expo, the Rubin Design Bureau revealed a new ballistic missile submarine design, with an angled hull design, similar to the British Dreadnought class, intended to make the submarine harder to detect. The submarine will also contain 12 missile tubes, and will be able to carry the Surrogat-V AUV, which is an anti-submarine warfare drone. It will also have 20% less displacement compared to current ballistic missile submarines, with a planned crew of around 100 people, and being 134 meters in length.

On 21 June 2023, the Rubin Design Bureau announced that the Arcturus class would begin replacing the Borei class from 2037 onwards.

== See also ==
- List of Soviet and Russian submarine classes
- Future of the Russian Navy
- List of submarine classes in service
- Submarine-launched ballistic missile
