= Russian submarine Yury Dolgorukiy =

Submarine in the Russian Navy

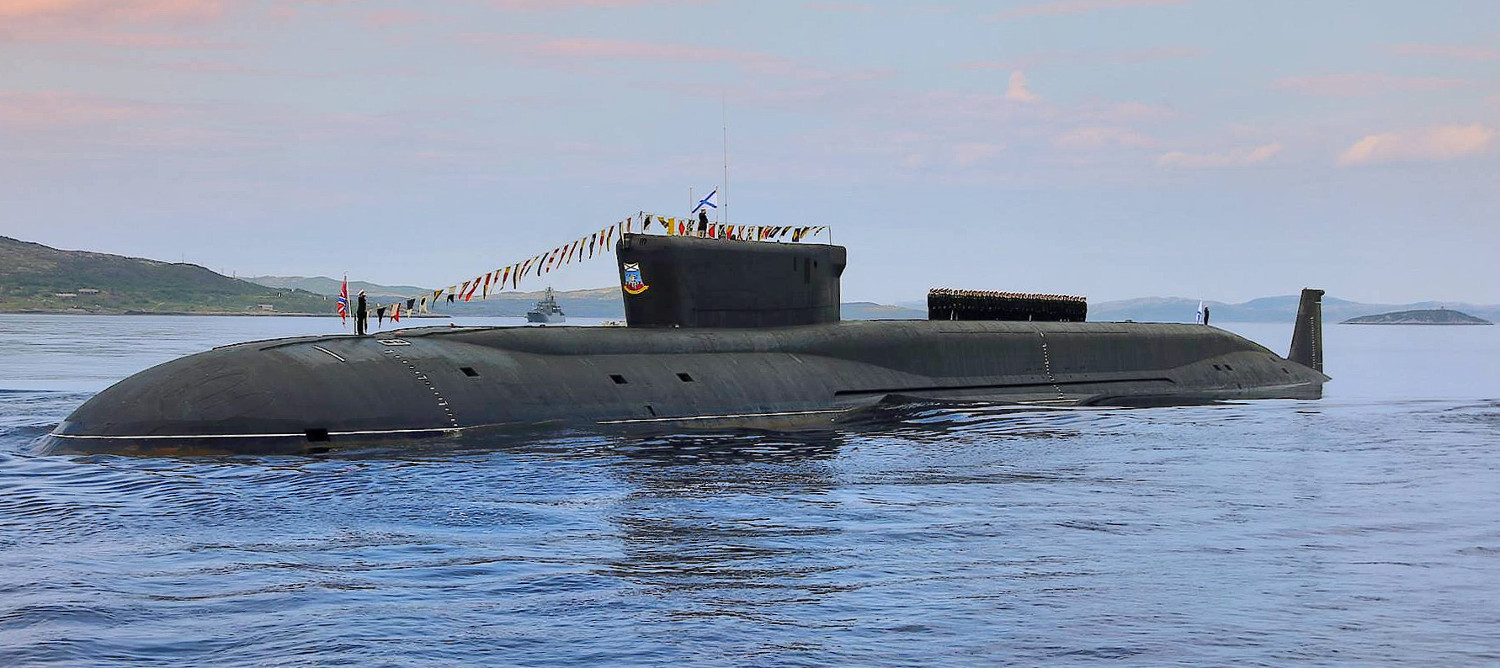
- Yury Dolgorukiy in October 2015

History

Russia
- Name: Yury Dolgorukiy
- Namesake: Yuriy Dolgorukiy
- Builder: Sevmash
- Laid down: 2 November 1996
- Launched: 13 February 2008
- Commissioned: 10 January 2013
- Status: In active service

General characteristics
- Class & type: Borei-class submarine
- Displacement: 14,720 t (14,488 long tons) surfaced; 24,000 t (23,621 long tons) submerged
- Length: 170 m (557 ft 9 in)
- Beam: 13.5 m (44 ft 3 in)
- Draught: 10 m (32 ft 10 in)
- Propulsion: 1 × OK-650B nuclear reactor (HEU <= 45%); 1 × AEU steam turbine; 1 shaft
- Speed: 25 knots (46 km/h; 29 mph)
- Complement: 130 officers and men
- Armament: 16 × RSM-56 Bulava SLBMs; 6 × 21 in (533 mm) torpedo tubes; RPK-2 Vyuga anti-submarine/ship missiles

Yury Dolgorukiy (K-535; Russian: К-535 Юрий Долгорукий) is a Borei-class nuclear-powered ballistic missile submarine of the Russian Navy, and the lead vessel of the class. Named after the founder of Moscow, Yuri Dolgorukiy, the vessel was laid down on 2 November 1996 and was first planned to enter service in 2001. However, project for the R-39M SLBM that the Borei class was supposed to carry was abandoned after several failed tests, and the submarine was redesigned for the new RSM-56 Bulava SLBM. The RSM-56 Bulava is smaller than the original R-39M, and in the 2007 START treaty data exchange it was reported that all Borei-class submarines would be equipped with 16 missiles instead of 12, as originally intended. Yury Dolgorukiy was commissioned on 10 January 2013, making it the first new strategic submarine to join the Northern Fleet since 1992.

== History ==
On 15 April 2007, the submarine was rolled out of the construction hall into a launch dock in Severodvinsk, when the vessel was about 82% complete. The Russian government allocated nearly 5 billion rubles, or 40% of the Navy's 2007 weapons budget, for the completion of the submarine.

There was some speculation that Yuriy Dolgorukiy would be rushed through the rest of the production and testing phases in order to be ready for the 2008 Russian presidential election. Much of the vessel's equipment remained uninstalled and untested, a process that would normally take over a year to complete.

On 13 February 2008, Yuriy Dolgorukiy was finally launched from the floating dock in Severodvinsk where the final outfitting took place. The submarine's reactor was first activated on 21 November 2008, and the submarine began its sea trials on 19 June 2009.

=== Sea trials ===
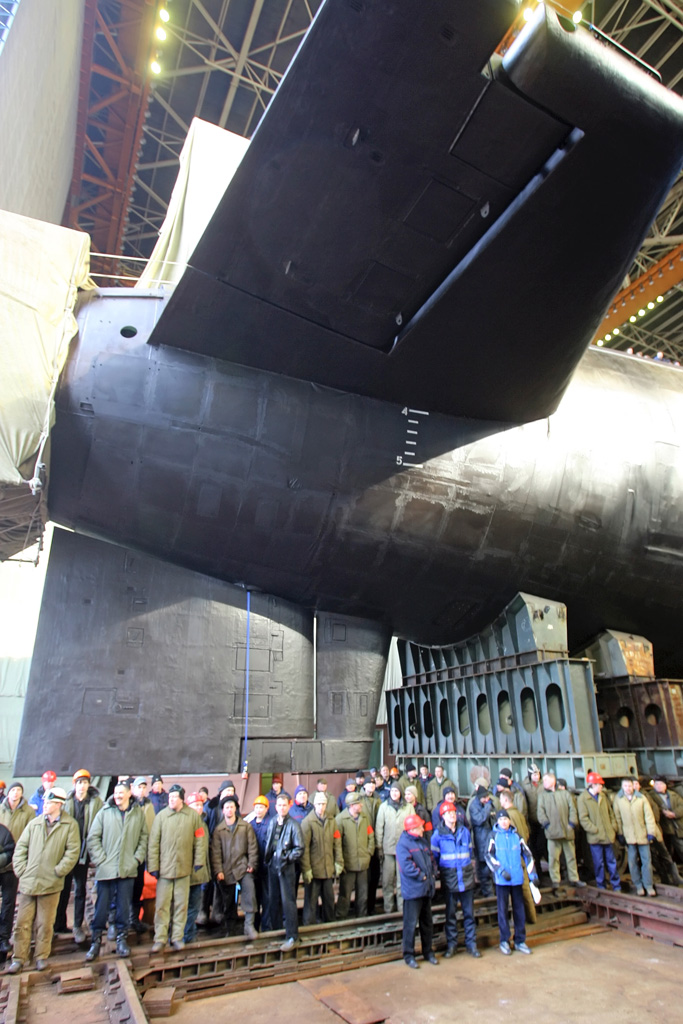
The launching of Yury Dolgorukiy

In July 2010, Yuriy Dolgorukiy passed the first of several company sea trials, in which navigation systems, buoyancy control system, and some other characteristics were tested at sea. All company tests were completed by the end of September 2010 and she was then preparing for state trials.

It was initially planned to conduct the first torpedo launches during the ongoing state trials in December 2010 and then in same month conduct the first launch of the main weapon system, the RSM-56 Bulava SLBM. The plan was then postponed to mid-summer 2011 due to ice conditions in White Sea.

The submarine was expected to be commissioned to Russian Pacific Fleet in the first half of 2011, but in December 2010 it was announced that Yury Dolgorukiy had technical defects and would be laid up for repairs. The work would take at least six months, and after this the submarine would continue the Bulava missile tests and could be ready for active duty by the later half of 2011.

On 7 June 2011, Yury Dolgorukiy left the Sevmash shipyard to continue sea trials and on 28 June the first Bulava SLBM was successfully launched.

On 12 January 2012, it was reported the submarine had successfully finished state trials and that Yury Dolgorukiy would be ready for commissioning within the next couple of months. It was later reported that both Yuri Dolgorukiy and Alexander Nevsky would enter service in the summer of 2012. Dmitry Rogozin later confirmed that the submarine will be transferred to the Russian navy on 29 July 2012. Yury Dolgorukiy was expected to join the Russian Navy by the end of the year, but tests carried out during the latest sea trials revealed a number of technical flaws. Software glitches in the automated launch control system prevented further tests of the Bulava missile, the submarine's main weapon. “We are expecting the Yury Dolgorukiy submarine to enter service in 2013,” then Defense Minister Anatoliy Serdyukov told Russian lawmakers at a meeting on defense issues.

The second Borei-class submarine, Alexander Nevsky, could join Russia's Pacific Fleet in 2014, the minister said. Sevmash shipyard claimed RUB 30 mln from Russian Defense Ministry for non-accepting Yury Dolgorukiy because it has to maintain the submarine, since then Defense Minister Anatoly Serdiukov decided to postpone commissioning of the sub and, therefore, deferral of all maintenance expenditures. According to the source, non-accepting of the submarine is related to the non-availability of mooring quays, primarily at Kamchatka where the first two Borei-class subs, Yury Dolgorukiy and Alexander Nevsky will be stationed.

Finally Yury Dolgorukiy joined the Russian Navy on 10 January 2013. The official ceremony of raising the Russian Navy colors on the submarine was led by Defense Minister Sergey Shoigu. Speaking via video-link, he informed the President Vladimir Putin that St. Andrew's ensign had been raised on the submarine, symbolically marking introduction of the submarine into the Russian Navy. In 2014, after a series of exercises, the submarine is fully operational with the Russian Northern Fleet. Yury Dolgorukiy completed its first deterrent patrol in 2015.

In 2024, the submarine began a prolonged refit/upgrade period that was likely to last several years.

== In fiction ==
- The Yury Dolgorukiy plays a prominent role in the Rick Campbell novel Ice Station Nautilus.
