= Russian submarine Knyaz Vladimir =

Borei-class nuclear-powered ballistic missile submarine of the Russian Navy

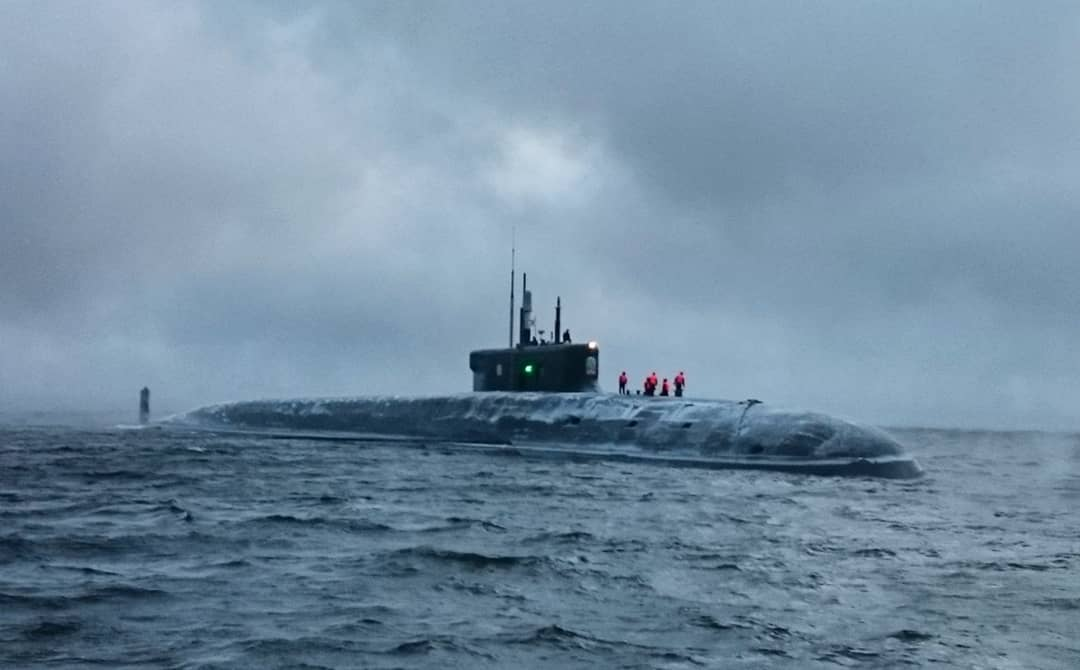
- Knyaz Vladimir during sea trials in February 2019

History

Russia
- Name: Knyaz Vladimir
- Namesake: Prince Vladimir
- Builder: Sevmash
- Laid down: 30 July 2012
- Launched: 17 November 2017
- Commissioned: 12 June 2020
- Status: In active service

General characteristics
- Class & type: Borei-class submarine
- Displacement: 14,720 t (14,488 long tons) surfaced; 24,000 t (23,621 long tons) submerged
- Length: 170 m (557 ft 9 in)
- Beam: 13.5 m (44 ft 3 in)
- Draught: 10 m (32 ft 10 in)
- Propulsion: 1 × OK-650V nuclear reactor; 1 × AEU steam turbine; 1 shaft
- Speed: 25 knots (46 km/h; 29 mph)
- Complement: 130 officers and men
- Armament: 16 × R-30 Bulava SLBMs; 6 × 21 in (533 mm) torpedo tubes to fire a variety of appropriately sized weapons

K-549 Knyaz Vladimir (Russian: АПЛ Князь Владимир) is a Borei-class nuclear-powered ballistic missile submarine, the first upgraded Borei-A (Project 955A) unit to enter service with the Russian Navy. The submarine is named after Knyaz Vladimir the Great.

== History ==
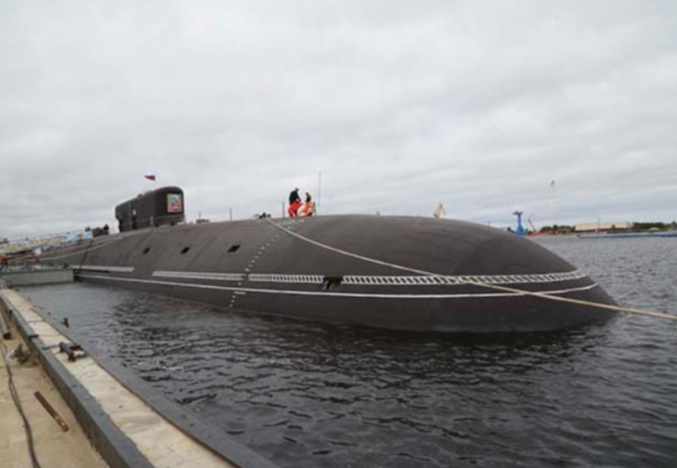
Nuclear submarine Knyaz Vladimir in the Gulf of Finland on 9 July 2021

Project 955A was developed by the Rubin Design Bureau, and the chief designer was Sergey Kovalev. The keel was expected to have been laid down in 2010, but this was delayed until July 2012 because of a price dispute between the Russian MOD and the United Shipbuilding Corporation.

Knyaz Vladimir is the first unit of the Project 955A sub-class and was intended to differ by several modifications from the previous units of the Project 955. These modifications included major structural changes, reduced acoustic signature, and more modern communication equipment. While initially reported to have four more (20 in total) launch tubes, the 955A includes 16 missile tubes, the same as the Project 955. The submarine was to be armed with the newest Russian submarine launched ballistic missile (SLBM), the RSM-56 Bulava. Knyaz Vladimir and its sister ships will eventually replace the Soviet-era Delta and Typhoon-class submarines in the Russian Navy.

Knyaz Vladimir was floated out on 17 November 2017, and it began the first stage of factory trials by late November 2018. The submarine returned to Sevmash in early 2019 and was to begin a second stage of factory trials by late June 2019. On 22 October 2019, Aleksandr Moiseyev, commander in chief of the Northern Fleet, stated that Knyaz Vladimir was expected to complete its sea trials by the end of the year. According to Moiseyev, completion of the sea trials was to be accompanied by the launch of a Bulava missile. On 29 October, the submarine conducted a successful Bulava launch from a submerged position in the White Sea.

According to TASS's defense industry sources, commissioning of the Knyaz Vladimir was delayed until the first quarter of 2020 due to a number of detected deficiencies. The following Komsomolskaya Pravda report, citing Alexei Rakhmanov, President of the USC, specified the commissioning period as "end of January" 2020.

On 28 May 2020, Knyaz Vladimir was accepted by the Ministry of Defence of Russia and was commissioned into service with the Russian Navy on 12 June 2020. With a pennant number K-549, the submarine is part of the 31st Submarine Division at the Northern Fleet.

On 26 March 2021, an unprecedented operation took place in the Arctic Ocean, as Knyaz Vladimir and two Delta IV-class ballistic missile submarines (SSBN), together armed with 48 SLBMs, surfaced simultaneously from under the ice with precision in a limited space with a radius of 300 meters for the first time in the history of the Russian Navy and former Soviet navy and in the world. The operation was part of the Umka-2021 exercise. The 1.5-meter-thick ice was broken by firing a torpedo. Russian Northern Fleet subs train frequently under icy conditions, including cruising under the Arctic, and as a part of training they learn how to find or make holes with a torpedo in ice in order to surface and dive. Russian navy submarines break ice on a regular basis and have developed special weapons to break ice in order to fire SLBMs, which was tested for the first time in 2014.

The submarine was reported active as of 2026.
