= Russian submarine Knyaz Pozharskiy =

Russian nuclear submarine

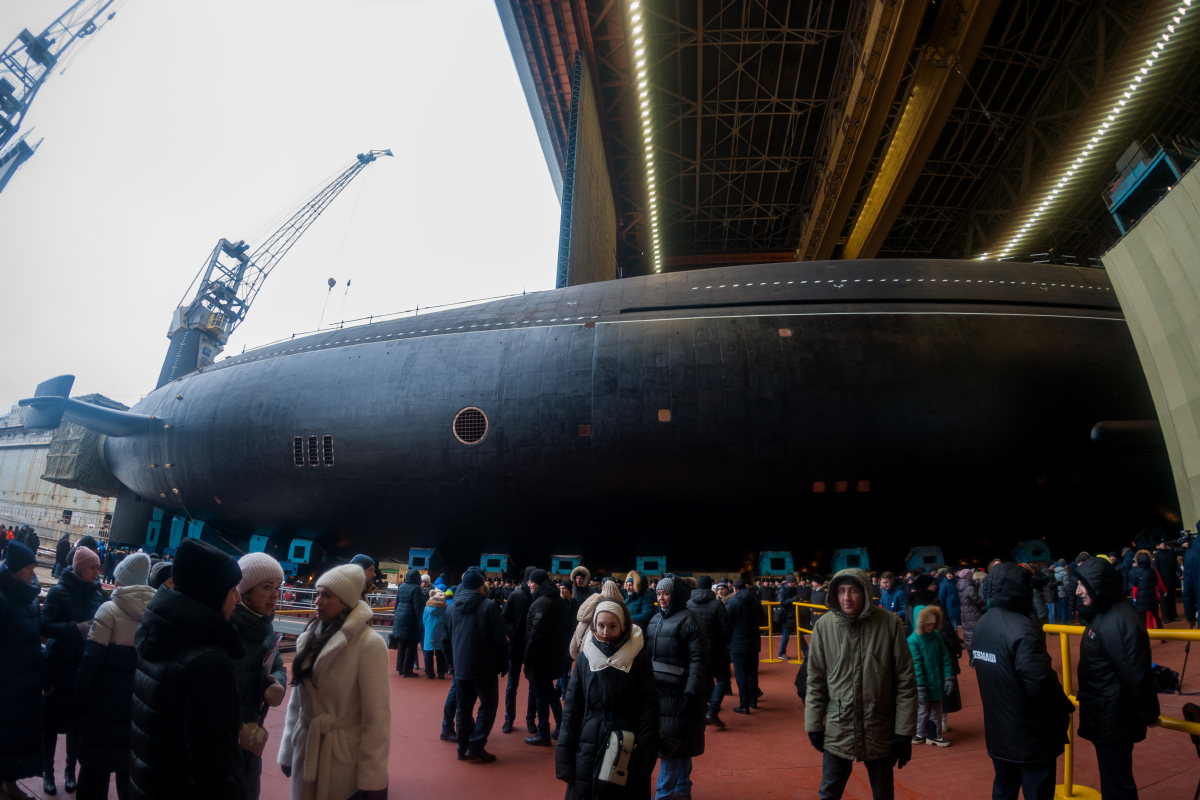
- Submarine Knyaz Pozharskiy launching ceremony

History

Russia
- Name: Knyaz Pozharsky
- Namesake: Dmitry Pozharsky
- Builder: Sevmash
- Laid down: 23 December 2016
- Launched: 3 February 2024
- Commissioned: 24 July 2025
- Status: In service

General characteristics
- Type: Borei-class submarine
- Displacement: 14,720 t (14,488 long tons) surfaced; 24,000 t (23,621 long tons) submerged
- Length: 170 m (557 ft 9 in)
- Beam: 13.5 m (44 ft 3 in)
- Draught: 10 m (32 ft 10 in)
- Propulsion: 1 × OK-650B nuclear reactor; 1 × AEU steam turbine; 1 shaft
- Speed: 25 knots (46 km/h; 29 mph)
- Complement: 107 officers and men
- Electronic warfare & decoys: RIM HAT, SNOOP HALF ESM
- Armament: 16 × R-30 Bulava SLBMs; 6 × (21 in (533 mm)) torpedo tubes to fire a variety of appropriately sized weapons

Knyaz Pozharsky (Russian: АПЛ Князь Пожарский) is a Borei-class nuclear-powered ballistic missile submarine of the Russian Navy. The submarine is named after Knyaz Dmitry Pozharsky.

== History ==
Project 955A was designed by Sergei Kovalev of the Rubin Design Bureau as an improved variant of the original Project 955. Construction of the Knyaz Pozharsky began with the keel laying on 23 December 2016 at the Sevmash shipyard in Severodvinsk, part of the United Shipbuilding Corporation. At the time the keel was laid, Russian Navy's Deputy Commander-in-Chief Vice Admiral Viktor Bursuk declared "The 955A series is coming to an end with this submarine. Now the Navy is working together with the Rubin Design Bureau on modernization of the project." However, in November 2018, additional two vessels were confirmed to be built by 2028.

Knyaz Pozharsky is to be deployed with the Russia's Northern Fleet.

The submarine went into service on 24 July 2025. The ceremony included Russian President Vladimir Putin and First Deputy Prime Minister Denis Manturov. It arrived on its permanent base on 2 August 2025.
