= Russian submarine Imperator Aleksandr III =

Nuclear-powered ballistic missile submarine

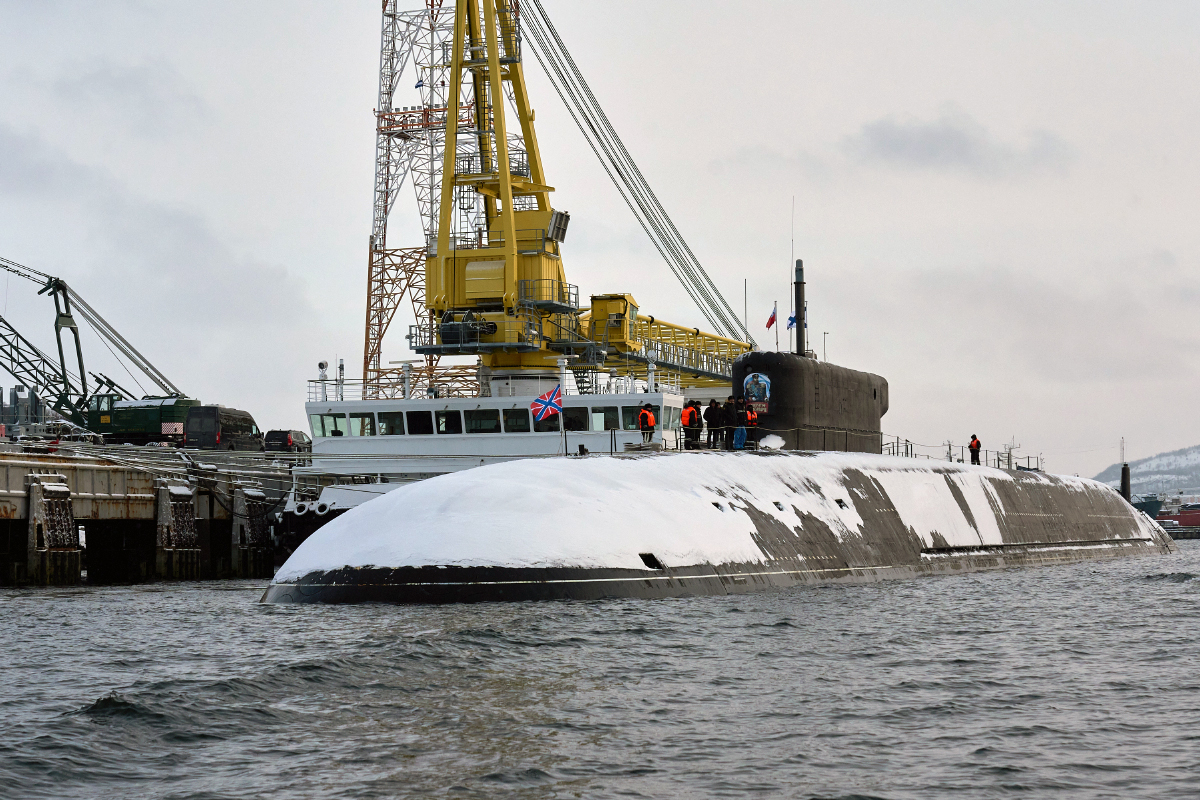
- Imperator Aleksandr III in 2024

History

Russia
- Name: Imperator Aleksandr III
- Namesake: Alexander III of Russia
- Builder: Sevmash
- Laid down: 18 December 2015
- Launched: 29 December 2022
- Commissioned: 11 December 2023
- Status: In service

General characteristics
- Type: Borei-class submarine
- Displacement: 14,720 t (14,488 long tons) surfaced; 24,000 t (23,621 long tons) submerged
- Length: 170 m (557 ft 9 in)
- Beam: 13.5 m (44 ft 3 in)
- Draught: 10 m (32 ft 10 in)
- Propulsion: 1 × OK-650B nuclear reactor; 1 × AEU steam turbine; 1 shaft
- Speed: 25 knots (46 km/h; 29 mph)
- Complement: 130 officers and men
- Electronic warfare & decoys: RIM HAT, SNOOP HALF ESM
- Armament: 16 × R-30 Bulava SLBMs; 6 × (21 in (533 mm) torpedo tubes) to fire a variety of appropriately sized weapons; RPK-2 Vyuga anti-submarine missile

Imperator Aleksandr III (Император Александр III) is a Borei-class nuclear-powered ballistic missile submarine of the Russian Navy. The submarine is named after Alexander III of Russia and was launched on 29 December 2022.

== Service history ==
The boat was reported to be nearing the conclusion of its state sea trials as of November 2023. She entered service on 11 December 2023.

After the completion of testing in the Arctic Ocean, Imperator Aleksandr III joined the Pacific Fleet in September 2024. In the summer of 2025 it carried out a three-month deployment in the Pacific Ocean.
