= Russian ship Dmitri Donskoi =

At least three ships of the Imperial Russian, Soviet or Russian Navy have been named Dmitri Donskoi after Dmitry Donskoy.

- Russian frigate Dmitri Donskoi - a 51-gun frigate that was stricken in 1872.
- Russian cruiser Dmitrii Donskoi - an armoured cruiser launched in 1883 and scuttled after the Battle of Tsushima in 1905.
- Russian submarine Dmitry Donskoy (TK-208) - the lead ship of the Typhoon-class nuclear-powered ballistic missile submarines.
- Russian submarine Dmitry Donskoy (K-556) - a submarine of the Borei-class nuclear-powered ballistic missile submarines.
