= Russian submarine Knyaz Oleg =

2020 Borei-class submarine

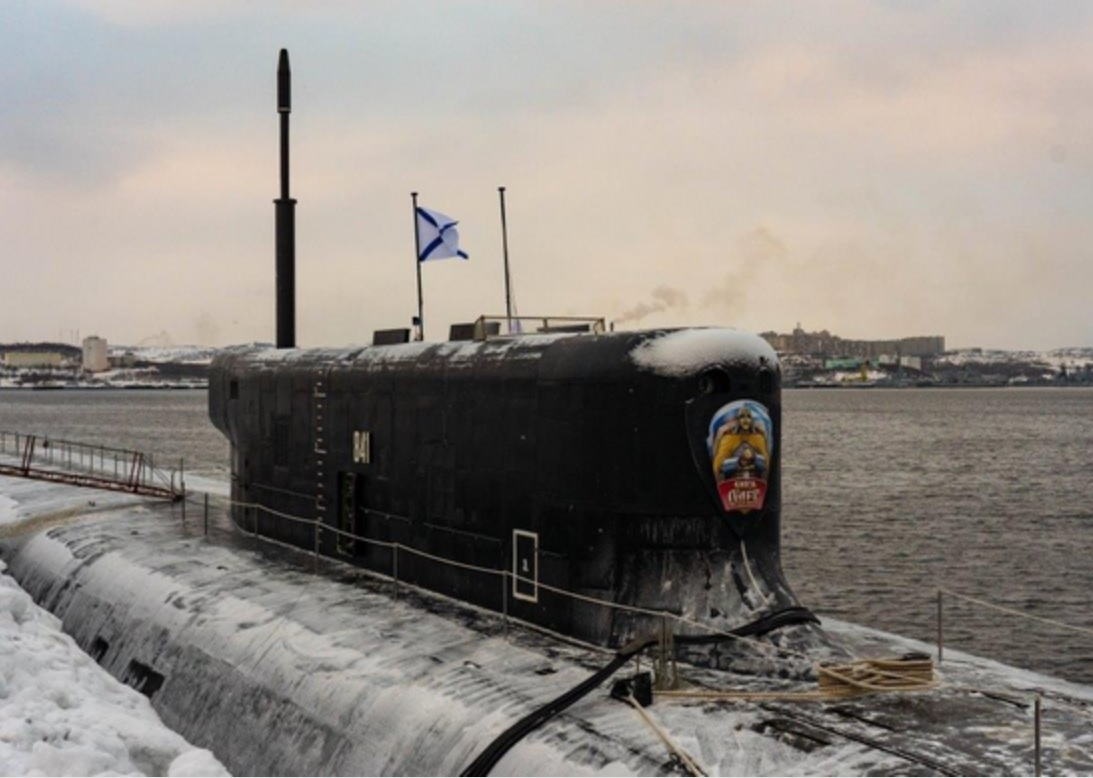
- Knyaz Oleg arrives at the Northern Fleet in February 2022

History

Russia
- Name: Knyaz Oleg
- Namesake: Oleg of Novgorod
- Builder: Sevmash
- Laid down: 27 July 2014
- Launched: 16 July 2020
- Commissioned: 21 December 2021
- Home port: Vilyuchinsk
- Status: In active service

General characteristics
- Type: Borei-class submarine
- Displacement: 14,720 t (14,488 long tons) surfaced; 24,000 t (23,621 long tons) submerged
- Length: 170 m (557 ft 9 in)
- Beam: 13.5 m (44 ft 3 in)
- Draught: 10 m (32 ft 10 in)
- Propulsion: 1 × OK-650B nuclear reactor; 1 × AEU steam turbine; 1 shaft
- Speed: 25 knots (46 km/h; 29 mph)
- Complement: 130 officers and sailors
- Armament: 16 × R-30 Bulava SLBMs; 6 × (21 in (533 mm) torpedo tubes) to fire a variety of appropriately sized weapons

Knyaz Oleg (Russian: АПЛ Князь Олег) is a Borei-class (Project 955A) nuclear-powered ballistic missile submarine developed by the Rubin Design Bureau and constructed by the Sevmash for the Russian Navy. The submarine is named after Oleg of Novgorod.

== Construction and career ==
The submarine was laid down on 27 July 2014. In February 2018, it was reported that the construction of the submarine had been delayed because the builder, Sevmash, had not received a diesel generator for the submarine. According to Sevmash the problem was with its supplier Kolomensky Zavod, which had not been able to deliver the part.

It was launched from its shipyard on 16 July 2020. She was reported on sea trials as of April 2021. While it was initially anticipated that the submarine would serve in the Pacific Fleet after commissioning, in May 2021 it was reported that consideration was being given to potentially transferring some of the Borei-class boats originally intended for the Pacific Fleet to the Northern Fleet instead. As of 2021, it was therefore unclear whether Knyaz Oleg would ultimately deploy with the Pacific or the Northern Fleet.

On 21 October 2021, Knyaz Oleg launched one missile from submerged position in the White Sea. Warheads successfully hit targets at the Kura Missile Test Range in Kamchatka.

On 21 December 2021, Knyaz Oleg was commissioned along with Novosibirsk into the Pacific Fleet. Russian President Vladimir Putin attended the ceremony via video call. The submarine was reported to have arrived at its permanent base in the Pacific in September 2022.
