= Russian submarine Alexander Nevsky =

Russian ballistic missile submarine

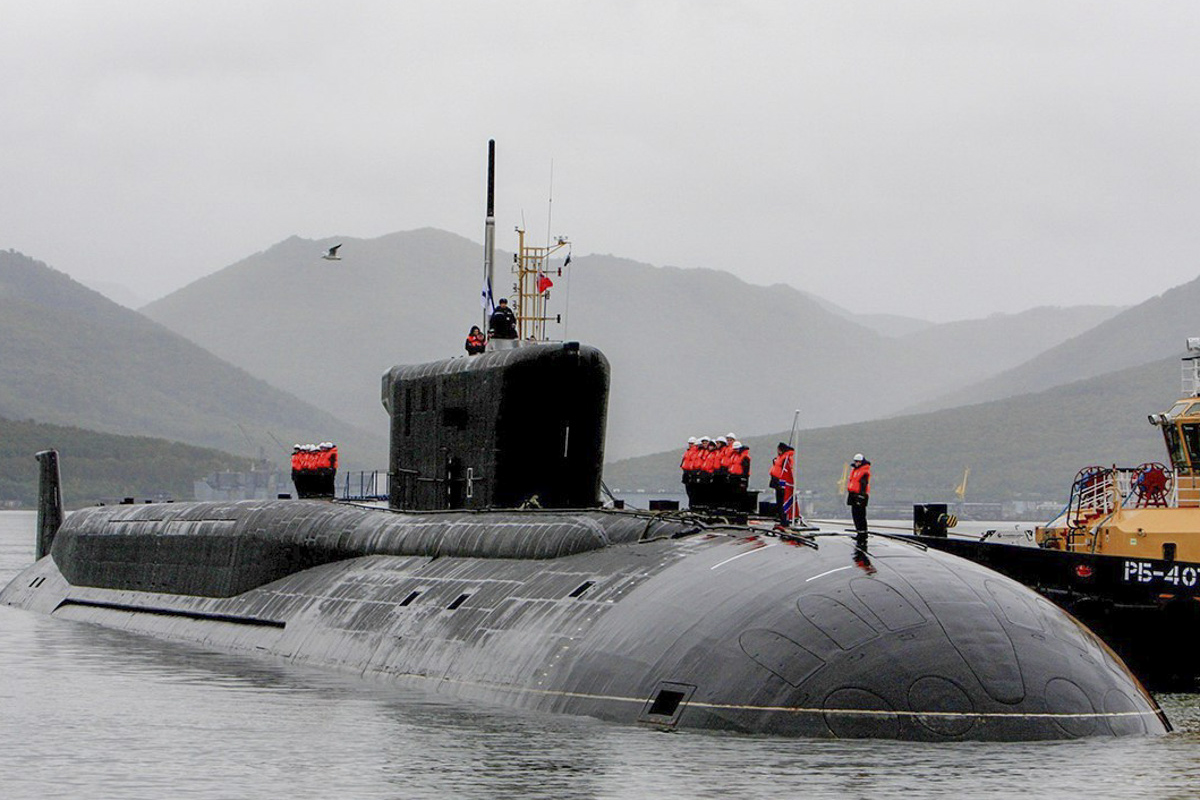
- Alexander Nevsky in Vilyuchinsk.

History

Russia
- Name: Alexander Nevsky
- Namesake: Alexander Nevsky
- Builder: Sevmash
- Laid down: 19 March 2004
- Launched: 6 December 2010
- Commissioned: 23 December 2013
- Status: In active service

General characteristics
- Class & type: Borei-class submarine
- Displacement: 14,720 t (14,488 long tons) surfaced; 24,000 t (23,621 long tons) submerged
- Length: 170 m (557 ft 9 in)
- Beam: 13.5 m (44 ft 3 in)
- Draught: 10 m (32 ft 10 in)
- Propulsion: 1 × OK-650B nuclear reactor (HEU <= 45%); 1 × AEU steam turbine; 1 shaft
- Speed: 28 knots (52 km/h; 32 mph)
- Complement: 130 officers and men
- Armament: 16 × Bulava SLBMs; 6 × RPK-2 Viyuga cruise missiles (21 in (533 mm) torpedo tubes)

K-550 Alexander Nevsky (Александр Невский, tr. Aleksandr Nevskij) is a Russian nuclear ballistic missile submarine of the fourth generation Borei class (Project 955). Named after the Russian saint Alexander Nevsky, the submarine was laid down in March 2004 and was first planned to be launched in 2009. However, budgetary problems and repeated failures of the submarine's main weapon, the Bulava SLBM missile, pushed the launch date backward. Russian officials have however claimed that the submarine has been completed on time and even ahead of schedule.

== Design and description ==
The submarine was to have been rolled out from its construction hall on 30 November 2010. This was postponed to December due to bad weather, according to the shipyard's press service.

On 2 December 2010, the submarine was rolled out from its construction hall to floating dock and would be launched at an unknown future date. The submarine was inspected by the Russian Prime Minister, Vladimir Putin on 13 December 2010. With an estimated cost of 23 billion RUR (~US$900 million), the new submarine has no significant differences from the lead ship, SSBN Yury Dolgorukiy.

On 24 October 2011, the submarine started its sea trials. It was planned to launch the first SLBM from Alexander Nevsky in 2012.

The submarine entered service on 23 December 2013.

== Commissioning and deployment ==
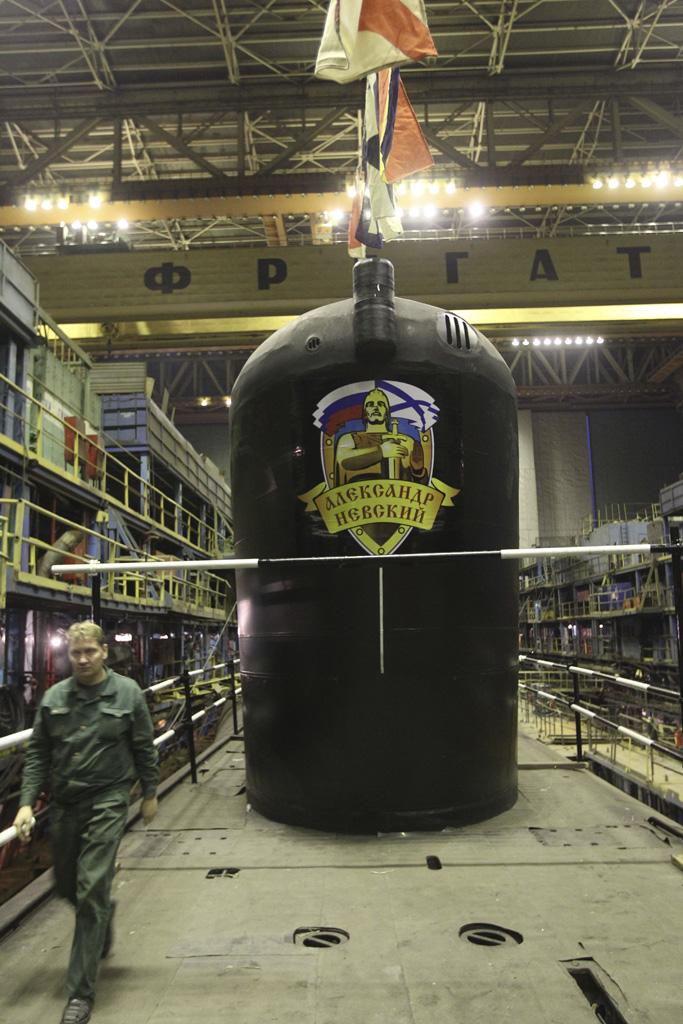
K-550 shortly before rolling out to floating dock

Alexander Nevsky, the second Borei-class vessel, has been commissioned into the Russian Navy, a Russia's Defense Ministry source told the TASS news agency on 14 April 2015. The submarine passed all its trials, including the test firing of its Bulava SLBMs.

Alexander Nevsky transferred from the Northern Fleet to the Pacific Fleet and arrived in the port of Vilyuchinsk, in the Kamchatka Peninsula on 30 September 2015.

By 10 October 2016, K-550 had reached the Russian region of the Sea of Japan. It surfaced near a tiny Russian fishing craft, almost sinking the boat and its crew of two fishermen. They filmed K-550's surfacing and their video went viral in Russia and made world news. In November 2016, she finished a combat patrol.

In late 2019, she was hit by Omsk in simulation exercises.

In September 2020, she finished a combat patrol.
