= RSM-56 Bulava =

Russian submarine-launched ballistic missile

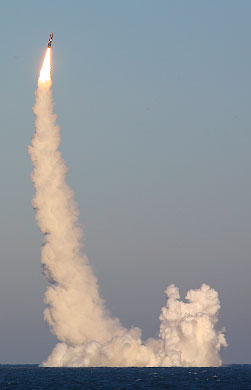
- Bulava launched from submarine Yuri Dolgoruky on 28 October 2011
- Type: SLBM
- Place of origin: Russia

Service history
- In service: 2018–present
- Used by: Russian Navy

Production history
- Designer: Moscow Institute of Thermal Technology
- Manufacturer: Votkinsk Plant State Production Association
- Unit cost: $32.2 million (2012)
- Produced: 2011

Specifications
- Mass: 36.8 t (36.2 long tons; 40.6 short tons)
- Length: 11.5 m (38 ft) (without warhead); 12.1 m (40 ft) (launch container)
- Diameter: 2 m (6 ft 7 in) (missile); 2.1 m (6 ft 11 in) (launch container)
- Warhead: 6 × 150 kt MIRVs
- Engine: Three stage solid and liquid head stage
- Payload capacity: 1150 kg
- Propellant: Solid propellant and liquid fuel
- Operational range: 8,300 km ≥ 9,300, 10,000km
- Guidance system: Inertial guidance, possibly with Astro-inertial guidance and/or GLONASS update
- Accuracy: 250-300 m CEP
- Launch platform: Borei-class submarines Typhoon-class submarine Dmitri Donskoi (as a testbed)

The RSM-56 Bulava (Russian: Булава, lit. "mace", NATO reporting names SS-N-30 / SS-NX-32, GRAU index 3M30, 3K30) is a nuclear capable submarine-launched ballistic missile (SLBM) developed for the Russian Navy and deployed in 2019 on the new Borei class of ballistic missile nuclear submarines. It is intended to serve as a crucial component of Russia's nuclear triad.

Designed by Moscow Institute of Thermal Technology, development of the missile was launched in the late 1990s as a replacement for the R-39 Rif solid-fuel SLBM. The Project 955/955A Borei-class submarines carry 16 missiles per vessel.

A source in the Russian defense industry told TASS on June 29, 2018, that the D-30 missile system with the R-30 Bulava intercontinental ballistic missile had been accepted for service in the Russian Navy after its successful four-missile salvo launch tests in 2018.

== Description ==
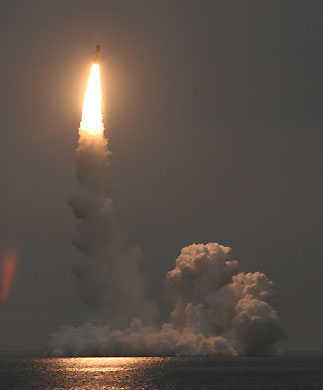
A Bulava tested in June 2017.

The Bulava missile was developed by Moscow Institute of Thermal Technology under the leadership of chief designer Yury Solomonov. Although it utilizes some engineering solutions used for the recent RT-2PM2 Topol-M ICBM, the new missile has been developed virtually from scratch. The Bulava is the submarine version of the Topol-M, and is both lighter and thinner than the Volna. The two missiles are expected to have comparable ranges, and similar CEP and warhead configurations. Bulava has a declared START throw weight of 1150 kg to 9,500 kilometers.

The missile has three stages; the first and second stages use solid fuel propellant, while the third stage uses a liquid fuel to allow high maneuverability during warhead separation. The missile can be launched from an inclined position, allowing a submarine to fire them while moving. It has a low flight trajectory, and due to this could be classified as a quasi-ballistic missile. It is rumored to possess advanced missile defense evasion capabilities and can maneuver at its boost stage.

Borei-class submarines carrying Bulava missiles are expected to be an integral part of the Russian nuclear triad until 2040.

Bulava can be loaded on TEL road mobile launchers, on railway BZhRK trains and other various launchers.

== Development history ==
=== Inception ===
In the 1990s, Russia had two submarine-launched ICBMs, the solid-fuel R-39 and the liquid-fuel R-29 Vysota family, both developed by the Makeyev Design Bureau. A new missile, designated R-39UTTH Bark was under development to replace the R-39. The Bark was planned to become the only submarine-launched ballistic missile of the Russian nuclear arsenal. However, its development was plagued with problems, and after three test failures the Bark programme was canceled in 1998. Moscow Institute of Thermal Technology was now tasked with developing a new advanced missile. The institute promised that it would be able to quickly develop a new naval missile based on its recent Topol-M land-based ICBM.

The new missile would be deployed per 16 missiles on the Borei I (Project 955) and Borei II (Project 955A) class submarines. As the new submarines would not be ready in time for flight tests, the Typhoon-class submarine Dmitry Donskoy was upgraded to carry Bulavas.

Key people involved in the decision to develop Bulava included the institute director and Bulava's chief designer Yury Solomonov; director of the Defense Ministry's Fourth Central Research Institute, Major-General Vladimir Dvorkin; Navy Commander, Fleet Admiral Vladimir Kuroyedov; Defense Minister, Marshal Igor Sergeyev; Economics Minister Yakov Urinson and Prime Minister Viktor Chernomyrdin.

=== First tests ===
The missile completed the first stage launch-tests at the end of 2004. Although it was initially planned to base the Bulava design on the Topol-M, the first tests showed that the new missile was completely different in terms of appearance, dimensions and warhead lay-out. It was later acknowledged that the Moscow Institute of Thermal Technology had developed Bulava virtually from scratch, reusing only a few engineering solutions from the Topol-M.

=== Troubles ===
The missile's flight test programme was problematic. Until 2009, there were 6 failures in 13 flight tests and one failure during ground test, blamed mostly on substandard components. This led to the missile's chief designer, Yury Solomonov resigning from his post in July 2009. Aleksandr Sukhodolskiy was appointed as the new general designer of sea-based ballistic missiles at the Moscow Institute of Thermal Technology; Solomonov however retained his post of general designer of land-based missiles.

After a failure in December 2009, further tests were put on hold and a probe was conducted to find out the reasons for the failures. Testing was resumed on 7 October 2010 with a launch from the Typhoon-class submarine Dmitri Donskoi in the White Sea; the warheads successfully hit their targets at the Kura Test Range in the Russian Far East. Seven launches have been conducted since the probe, all successful. On 28 June 2011, the missile was launched for the first time from its standard carrier, Borei-class submarine Yury Dolgorukiy, and on 27 August 2011 the first full-range (over 9,000 km (5,600 mi)) flight test was conducted. After this successful launch, the start of serial production of Bulava missiles in the same configuration was announced on 28 June 2011. A successful salvo launch on 23 December 2011 concluded the flight test programme. The missile was officially approved for service on 27 December 2011, and was reported to be commissioned aboard Yuri Dolgorukiy on 10 January 2013. The missile did however continue to fail in the summer of 2013 and was not operational as of November 2013. The Bulava became operational aboard Yury Dolgorukiy as of October 2015. However, recent developments put this in question. In November 2015, the submarine Vladimir Monomakh fired two missiles while submerged. One of the missiles self-destructed during the boost phase and the other failed to deliver its warheads to the specified target. After being sent back to the manufacturer, it was determined that the missiles failed due to manufacturing defects.

After two successful tests in June 2017 and May 2018, a source in the Russian defense industry told TASS on June 29, 2018, that the D-30 missile system with the R-30 Bulava intercontinental ballistic missile had been accepted for service in the Russian Navy.

==== Explanations for the failures ====
Chief designer Solomonov blamed the failures on the poor state of the Russian defense industry and problems in the design-technology-production chain.

"Sometimes [the problem] is poor-quality materials, sometimes it is the lack of necessary equipment to exclude the 'human' factor in production, sometimes it is inefficient quality control"

According to Solomonov, the industry is unable to manufacture 50 of the necessary components for the missile, forcing designers to improvise and look for alternative solutions, which seriously complicates the testing process. Solomonov further said that despite the failures, there was no need for changes in the design.

Sergei Kovalyov, the designer of three generations of Russian strategic submarines said that due to lack of funding, the developers had been unable to conduct test launches from a floating pad to test the underwater segment of the missile's trajectory. He also said that there were insufficient funds to conduct ground-based test launches. Both types of testing had been standard procedure during Soviet times. Kovalyov also criticised the poor quality of missile components provided by a large number of sub-contractors and the absence of military representatives at manufacturing plants.

The 2009 Norwegian spiral anomalies, a temporary strange light phenomenon over vast areas of northern Norway have been explained with a failed stage of a Bulava missile test. According to a spokesman, "The missile's first two stages worked as normal, but there was a technical malfunction at the next, third, stage of the trajectory".

==== Effects on the military ====
Due to the delays in Bulava's development, the launch of the fourth Borei-class submarine, Svyatitel Nikolay, was pushed back. Russia was planning to build eight Borei-class submarines by 2015.

Only one Typhoon-class submarine, Dmitry Donskoy, was modified to launch Bulavas. The Bulava program is the most expensive weapons project in Russia.

==== Debate about the program ====
Despite continued test failures, the Russian defense minister, Anatoliy Serdyukov, has stated that the project will not be abandoned. "We will certainly not give up the Bulava. I think that despite all the failures, the missile will fly," he said in an interview in late December 2009. The Russian military has been adamant that there is no alternative to Bulava.

There has been discussions among analysts about the possibility of re-equipping the Borei-class submarines with the more reliable liquid-propellant R-29RMU Sineva missiles. The Sineva is an upgrade of the R-29RM Shtil and entered service in 2007. According to RIA Novosti military analyst Ilya Kramnik, this would have been an attractive option, given that the less advanced Sineva missiles already have "virtually the same impressive specifications as the Trident II (D5) SLBMs wielded by the U.S. Navy and the Royal Navy." However, the work needed to redesign and modify the Borei-class submarines to carry Sinevas is regarded as too expensive.

==== Probe ====
After a launch failure in December 2009 caused by a defective engine nozzle and which led to the 2009 Norwegian spiral anomaly, further tests were put on hold and a review of the missile program was initiated. The results of the probe were delivered to the Russian government in May 2010.

=== 2010 tests ===
Testing was resumed for the first time after the probe on 7 October 2010. The missile was launched from the submerged Dmitry Donskoy, in the White Sea, and the warheads successfully hit their targets at the Kura testing range, 380 kilometres (240 mi) to the north of Petropavlovsk-Kamchatsky in the Russian Far East. The launch reportedly took place at 07:15 UTC. The missile travelled over 6,000 kilometres (3,700 mi), and the rocket's trajectory was within the normal parameters, according to a Navy official.

The second test launch in 2010 from Dmitry Donskoy was set to 29 October and was successful.

The next test to be performed from Yuriy Dolgorukiy was initially planned to December 2010, but was postponed to mid-summer 2011 due to ice conditions in White Sea.

=== 2011 tests and deployment ===
According to the Russian Vice Premier Sergei Ivanov another six successful launches (one planned in 2010, other five in 2011) will be required before the missile could be commissioned.

=== 2012 tests and deployment ===
In August 2012 a high-ranking official of Russia's United Shipbuilding Corporation said in 2012 Russia will test fire its Bulava missile only once, in November, specifically from the nuclear-powered submarine Alexander Nevsky.

=== 2013 deployment ===
Bulava was finally commissioned with its lead carrier Yuri Dolgorukiy on 10 January 2013. The official ceremony of raising the Russian Navy colors on the submarine was led by Russian Defense Minister Sergey Shoigu. After another failed launch in September, Shoigu announced a pause in the state trials of the next two submarines and five more test launches. The entire production run of the missiles was then recalled for factory inspections.

=== 2026 tests and deployment ===
On 28 October 2026, the Pacific Fleet's Project 955A Borei-A class nuclear submarine Generalissimus Suvorov executed a successful submerged test launch of an R-30 Bulava missile from the Sea of Okhotsk. The warheads hit their designated targets at the Chizha Proving Ground in the Arkhangelsk region.

== Timetable ==
RSM-56 Bulava launches
#	Date	Result	Position	Submarine	Notes
01	24 June 2004	Failure	Surfaced	Dmitriy Donskoi	Solid-propellant engine exploded during the test.
02	23 September 2004	Success	Submerged	Dmitriy Donskoi	Ejection of a full mock-up of the Bulava missile from a submerged position.
03	27 September 2005	Success	Surfaced	Dmitriy Donskoi	First flight test. The missile flew for 14 minutes and covered a distance of 5,500 km (3,400 mi). Warheads hit all designated targets at the testing grounds.
04	21 December 2005	Success	Submerged	Dmitriy Donskoi	All targets at the Kura Missile Test Range were hit.
05	7 September 2006	Failure	Submerged	Dmitriy Donskoi	A glitch in the program caused the missile to deviate from set trajectory and fall into the sea before reaching the target.
06	25 October 2006	Failure	Submerged	Dmitriy Donskoi	The missile deviated from the trajectory, self-destructed and fell into the White Sea.
07	24 December 2006	Failure	Surfaced	Dmitriy Donskoi	Malfunction of the third-stage engine caused the missile to self-destruct.
08	29 June 2007	Success	Submerged	Dmitriy Donskoi	Warheads hit targets at the Kura Missile Test Range.
09	18 September 2008	Success	Submerged	Dmitriy Donskoi	Launch at 18:45, warheads hit target at 19:05.
10	28 November 2008	Success	Submerged	Dmitriy Donskoi	The first statements suggests that the test was a success.
11	23 December 2008	Failure	Submerged	Dmitriy Donskoi	The missile malfunctioned during firing of its third-stage and self-destructed on command.
12	15 July 2009	Failure	Submerged	Dmitriy Donskoi	The missile self-destructed after a malfunction during the first-stage of its flight from the White Sea.
13	9 December 2009	Failure	Submerged	Dmitriy Donskoi	The missile test failed due to a malfunction in the third-stage engine. Notably caused the 2009 Norwegian spiral anomaly.
14	7 October 2010	Success	Submerged	Dmitriy Donskoi	Targets at the Kura Missile Test Range in the Russian Far East were successfully hit.
15	29 October 2010	Success	Submerged	Dmitriy Donskoi	Launch from the White Sea. Targets at the Kura Missile Test Range were hit successfully.
16	27 June 2011	Success	Submerged	Yury Dolgorukiy	First launch from standard missile carrier from the White Sea. Targets at the Kura Missile Test Range were hit successfully.
17	27 August 2011	Success	Submerged	Yury Dolgorukiy	Maximum flight range test, launch from the White Sea from a submerged position. Target at the Pacific Ocean was hit successfully.
18	28 October 2011	Success	Submerged	Yury Dolgorukiy	Successful launch from the White Sea. Warheads hit target at the Kura Missile Test Range in Kamchatka.
19	23 December 2011	Success	Submerged	Yury Dolgorukiy	A salvo launch involving two missiles. Warheads hit designated targets at the Kura Missile Test Range in Kamchatka.
20	6 September 2013	Failure	Submerged	Alexander Nevsky	A malfunction in one of its systems on the second minute of the flight.
21	9 September 2014	Success	Submerged	Vladimir Monomakh	The missile was launched from a location off northwest Russia's White Sea and hit a designated target at the Kura Missile Test Range.
22	29 October 2014	Success	Submerged	Yury Dolgorukiy	The missile successfully hit all targets at the Kura Missile Test Range.
23	28 November 2014	Success	Submerged	Alexander Nevsky	Alexander Nevsky fired the missile from under water in the Barents Sea and it landed on a military training ground in Kamchatka, as planned.
24	15 November 2015	Failure or success	Submerged	Vladimir Monomakh	According to Pravda.ru, one of the missiles self-destructed during the boost phase and the other demonstrated low accuracy. After being sent back to the manufacturer, it was determined that the missiles failed due to manufacturing defects. Other sources state the two missiles were flown successfully and the warheads hit the designated targets at the Kura Missile Test Range.
25	27 September 2016	Partial Success	Submerged	Yury Dolgorukiy	Two missiles were launched, one successfully struck a designated target at the Kura Missile Test Range, another one self-destructed.
26	26 June 2017	Success	Submerged	Yury Dolgorukiy	Warheads of the Bulava missile performed a full cycle of the flight and successfully hit the designated targets at the Kura Missile Test Range in Kamchatka.
27	22 May 2018	Success	Submerged	Yury Dolgorukiy	Fired a salvo of four missiles from submerged position. Tactical and technical characteristics and reliability of the strategic missile submarine Yury Dolgorukiy and the Bulava missile were confirmed. This was the first time Russia test-launched such number of SLBMs since the Operation Behemoth-2 on 6 August 1991.
28	24 August 2019	Success	Submerged	Yury Dolgorukiy	Fired a Bulava missile from the Barents Sea as part of combat training. Warheads hit targets at the Kura Missile Test Range in Kamchatka.
29	30 October 2019	Success	Submerged	Knyaz Vladimir	Fired a Bulava missile from the White Sea from submerged position as part of submarine trials. Warheads hit targets at the Kura Missile Test Range in Kamchatka.
30	12 December 2020	Success	Submerged	Vladimir Monomakh	Fired a salvo of four missiles from submerged position. Warheads have hit targets at the Chiza Missile Test Range in Kanin peninsula.
31	21 October 2021	Success	Submerged	Knyaz Oleg	Fired one missile from submerged position in the White Sea. Warheads have successfully hit targets at the Kura Missile Test Range in Kamchatka.
32	3 November 2022	Success	Submerged	Generalissimus Suvorov	Fired one missile from submerged position in the White Sea. Warheads have successfully hit targets at the Kura Missile Test Range in Kamchatka.
33	5 November 2023	Success	Submerged	Imperator Aleksandr III	Fired one missile from submerged position in the White Sea. Warheads have successfully hit targets at the Kura Missile Test Range in Kamchatka.
34	30 October 2024	Success		Knyaz Oleg	Fired one missile from position in the Okhotsk Sea. Warheads have hit targets at the Chiza Missile Test Range in Kanin peninsula.
35	28 October 2026	Success	Submerged	Generalissimus Suvorov	Fired one missile from a submerged position in the Sea of Okhotsk. The warheads successfully hit designated targets at the Chizha Missile Test Range in the Arkhangelsk region.

== Service ==
In October 2010 it was reported that 150-170 operational missiles would be built (124 active + reserve for training and tests). After the successful launch on 27 June 2011, the Russian government announced the start of serial production of Bulava missiles. On 10 January 2013, Bulava was adopted into experimental service with its lead carrier submarine Yuri Dolgorukiy. It was reported in June 2018 that the missile has been accepted for service by the Russian Navy after its successful test firings conducted in 2018. Russian state media reported on 14 May 2024 that the missile officially entered service on 7 May.

== Operators ==
Russia

- The Russian Navy is the only operator of the RSM-56 Bulava. As of July 2025, 128 missiles were deployed on 8 Borei-class ballistic missile submarines:
  - K-535 Yury Dolgorukiy
  - K-550 Alexander Nevsky
  - K-551 Vladimir Monomakh
  - K-549 Knyaz Vladimir
  - K-552 Knyaz Oleg
  - K-553 Generalissimus Suvorov
  - K-554 Imperator Aleksandr III
  - K-555 Knyaz Pozharskiy

== Specifications ==
Specifications comparison
	Bulava R-30 Russia	Trident C4 United States	Trident D5 United States	M51 (missile) France	JL-2 China
Number of stages	3	3	3	3	3
Length of assembled missile without front section, m	11.5	10.3	13.59	12	13
Maximum diameter of missile airframe (without stabilizers, raceways, protruding elements), m	2	1.88	2.11	2.3	2
Launch weight, tonnes	36.8	32.3	58.5	52	42
Total length of missile as a unit with launch canister (with front section), m	12.1	n/a	13.58	n/a	n/a
Throw weight, kg	1,150	1,500	2,800	n/a	n/a
Throw Weight (kg) Per Tonne	31.25	46.44	47.86	n/a	n/a
Warhead	6-10 × 100-150 kt	8 × 100 kt	8 × 475 kt (Mk-5 RV); 14 × 90-100 kt (Mk-4/Mk-4A); ≥1 × 5-7 kt (W76-2)	6-10 × 100-300 kt	1 × 1 Mt
Operational range, km	8,000-15,000	7,400	6,700-12,000	8,000-10,000	7,200
Accuracy, CEP (meters)	350	229-500	100-381 (Mk-4 RV, to be retired)	150-200	n/a
Navigation	astro-inertial, GLONASS	astro-inertial	astro-inertial, GPS	astro-inertial, Galileo	astro-inertial, BeiDou
In service	2018–present	1979 - 2005	1990–present	2010–present	2015–present

== See also ==
- R-29 Vysota – (Soviet Union)
- R-29RM Shtil – (Soviet Union)
- R-29RMU Sineva – (Russia)
- R-29RMU2 Layner – (Russia)
- Kanyon – (Russia)
- UGM-133 Trident II – (United States)
- M51 (missile) – (France)
- JL-3 – (China)
- K-6 – (India)
- Pukguksong-6 – (North Korea)
- R-39 Rif – (Soviet Union)
- R-39M – (Russia)
