= Russian submarine Vladimir Monomakh =

2012 Borei-class submarine

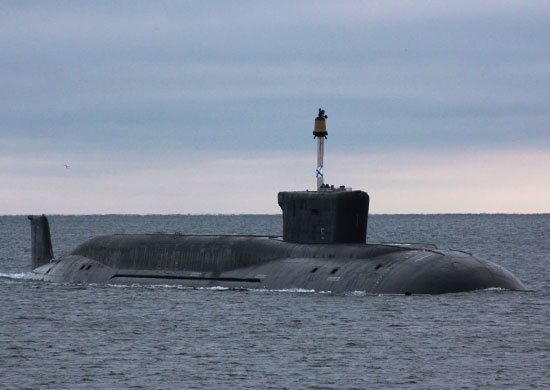
- Vladimir Monomakh on sea trials

History

Russia
- Name: Vladimir Monomakh
- Namesake: Vladimir II Monomakh
- Builder: Sevmash
- Laid down: 19 March 2006
- Launched: 30 December 2012
- Commissioned: 19 December 2014
- Home port: Vilyuchinsk
- Status: In active service

General characteristics
- Class & type: Borei-class submarine
- Displacement: 14,720 t (14,488 long tons) surfaced; 24,000 t (23,621 long tons) submerged
- Length: 170 m (557 ft 9 in)
- Beam: 13.5 m (44 ft 3 in)
- Draught: 10 m (32 ft 10 in)
- Propulsion: 1 × OK-650B nuclear reactor (HEU <= 45%); 1 × AEU steam turbine; 1 shaft
- Speed: 25 knots (46 km/h; 29 mph)
- Complement: 130 officers and men
- Armament: 16 × Bulava SLBMs; 6 × SS-N-15 cruise missiles (21 in (533 mm) torpedo tubes)

K-551 Vladimir Monomakh (Russian: АПЛ Владимир Мономах) is a Russian ballistic missile submarine of the fourth generation Borei class (Project 955) that became operational in 2015. It is named after Vladimir II Monomakh (1053–1125), the Grand Duke of Kievan Rus'.

== Development ==
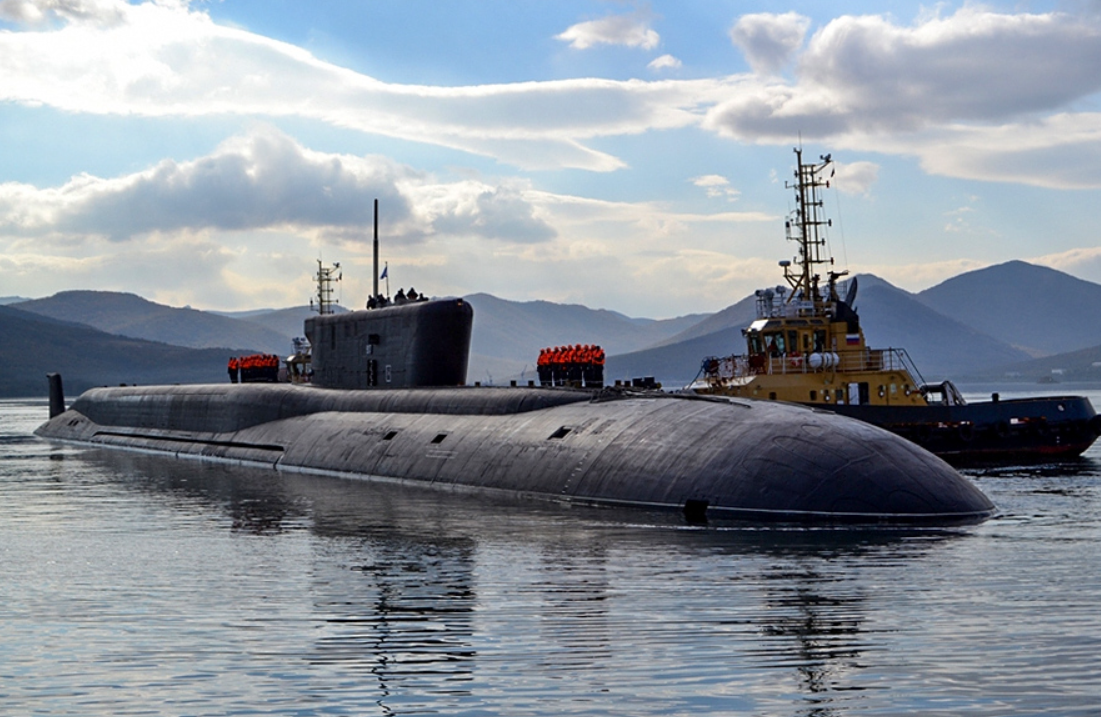
Arrival of SSBN Vladimir Monomakh to Vilyuchinsk

The project was developed by the Rubin Design Bureau, and the chief designer was Sergei Nikitich Kovalev. The keel was laid down on 19 March 2006 at the Sevmash shipyard in Severodvinsk. The hull of the Akula-class submarine K-480 Ak Bars was used in the construction of Vladimir Monomakh.

The submarine will be armed with 16 of the newest submarine-launched ballistic missile developed in Russia, the Bulava (NATO designation SS-N-32). Vladimir Monomakh and its sister ships will replace the Delta III and IV classes in the Russian Navy. The submarine was launched on 30 December 2012 and began moored tests in January 2013.

The submarine finished its first sea trials on 8 October 2013 when returning from a 25-day trial at sea. On 9 September 2014 a Bulava missile was launched from the submarine.

== Service history ==
Vladimir Monomakh entered service on 19 December 2014. It arrived to its permanent base in the Pacific Fleet on 26 September 2016.

The submarine launched a salvo of Bulava ballistic missiles during training exercises in November 2015 and in December 2020.
