= R-29RMU Sineva =

Submarine-launched ballistic missile

R-29RMU2 Sineva
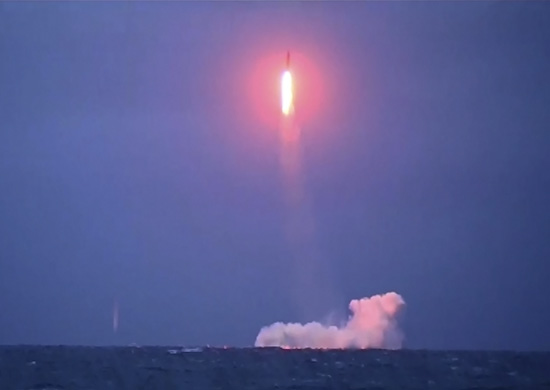
- Sineva launched on 12 December 2015
- Type: SLBM
- Place of origin: Russia

Service history
- In service: 2007–present
- Used by: Russian Navy

Production history
- Designer: Makeyev Rocket Design Bureau
- Manufacturer: ZMZ/KMZ

Specifications
- Mass: 40.3 tonnes
- Length: 14.8 m
- Diameter: 1.9 m
- Engine: Three-stage liquid-propellant rocket
- Operational range: 8,300 km (max range),
- Guidance system: Astroinertial, GLONASS
- Accuracy: 250-500 m

The R-29RMU2 Sineva (Russian: Синева, lit. "blueness"), code RSM-54, is a Russian liquid-fueled submarine-launched ballistic missile with GRAU index 3M27, designation SS-N-23A Skiff. It can carry four warheads and is designed to be launched from Delta IV-class submarines, which are armed with 16 missiles each. As of 2017, there are 96 launchers deployed on the submarines.

The first full-range test was reportedly conducted on October 11, 2008; the reported range was 11,547 kilometres (7,175 mi). The R-29RMU2 entered service in 2007 and is expected to remain in service until at least 2030.

Current plans call for the construction of approximately 100 such missiles.

The Sineva missile has reportedly been modified into R-29RMU2 Layner missile as of 2012.

== Background ==
At its height in 1984, the Soviet Navy conducted over 100 SSBN patrols. The Russian Navy declined during the 1990s, with no SSBN patrols carried out in 2001–2002. The development of the Sineva is part of a program tasked with "preventing the weakening of Russia's nuclear deterrent."

The R-29RMU2 Sineva is seen as a rival to the solid propellant Bulava SLBM. Originally, the Russian Navy was slated to receive the Sineva missile in 2002, but the first test was conducted only in 2004. The missile was eventually commissioned in 2007. The missile was reported to carry new nuclear warheads.

== Testing ==
=== Initial launch failures ===
Failed Sineva test launches took place during the strategic command exercise “Security-2004” (held 10–18 February 2004), which also included the launch of a Molniya communication satellite and an R-36 missile. The launch failures involving nuclear submarines Novomoskovsk and Karelia may have been caused by a military satellite blocking the launch signal; this incident did not lead to any serious consequences for the K-407 Novomoskovsk strategic nuclear submarine. March 1, 2004 saw then Russian president Vladimir Putin instructing the acting defence minister to carry out an investigation in order to determine the reason of the launch failures of the three RSM-54 missiles in mid-February.

=== Successful launches ===
On 17 March 2004 Novomoskovsk of the Russian Northern Fleet performed a successful launch of the RSM-54 Sineva. The missile's two warheads reportedly hit their targets. President Vladimir Putin and Defense Minister Sergei Ivanov observed a successful test launch of the Sineva missile from K-84 Yekaterinburg. Further successful launches were conducted by Yekaterinburg on 8 September 2006. The missile was launched from an ice-covered polar region toward the Chizha test site at the Kanin Peninsula. The three warheads were reported to have successfully reached their targets.

Another successful launch was performed on 4 March 2010 from the Barents Sea. This was followed by more launches on 6 August 2010, when K-114 Tula fired two missiles towards the Kura Test Range. Two more launches were carried out on 20 May 2011 and 27 July 2011, both successful.

On 5 November 2014, Tula hit targets at the Kura Test Range firing from the Barents Sea.

The 27th underwater launch occurred on 12 December 2015; the Russian Ministry of Defence shared video on official YouTube site and major Russian news channels.

Another successful launch was conducted on 12 October 2016 and one more on 24 August 2019. Eight more launches took place on 17 October 2019, 9 December 2020, 19 February 2022, 26 October 2022, 25 October 2023, 29 October 2024, 22 October 2025 and 21 May 2026.

== Operators ==
Russia

- Russian Navy

== See also ==
- R-29 Vysota – (Soviet Union)
- R-29RM Shtil – (Soviet Union)
- R-29RMU2 Layner – (Russia)
- RSM-56 Bulava – (Russia)
- Kanyon – (Russia)
- UGM-133 Trident II – (United States)
- M45 (missile) – (France)
- M51 (missile) – (France)
- JL-2 – (China)
- JL-3 – (China)
- Pukguksong-1 – (North Korea)
- R-39 Rif – (Soviet Union)
- R-39M – (Russia)

== External sources ==
- CSIS Missile Threat - SS-N-23
