= R-39 (missile) =

Submarine-launched ballistic missile

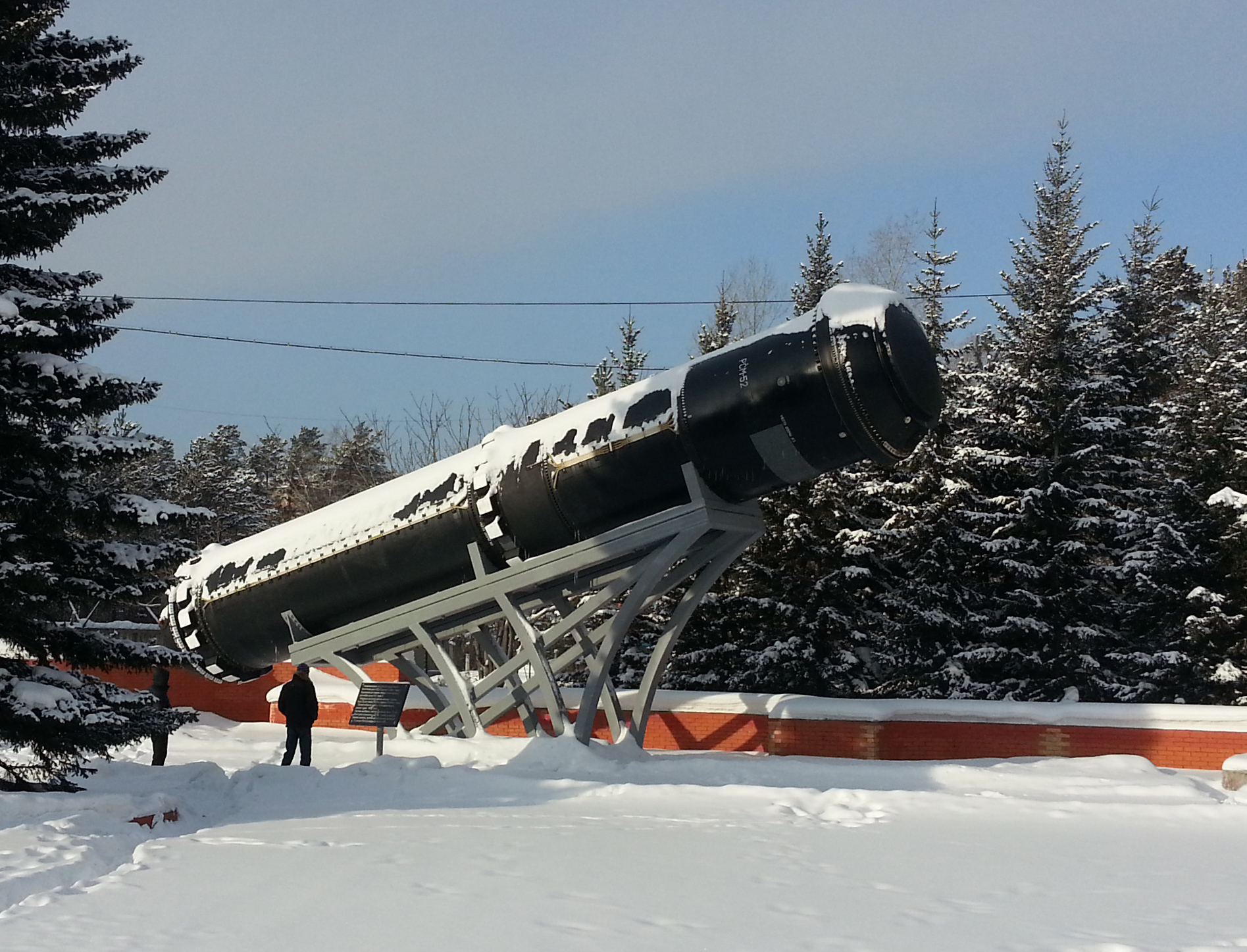
- R-39
- Type: SLBM
- Place of origin: Soviet Union

Service history
- In service: 1983–2004
- Used by: Soviet Navy; Russian Navy

Production history
- Designer: Makeyev Rocket Design Bureau
- Manufacturer: Zlatoust Machine-Building Plant

Specifications
- Mass: 84 tonnes (185,000 lb)
- Length: 16.1 metres (53 ft) (8.4 metres (28 ft) without warhead)
- Diameter: 2.4 metres (7.9 ft)
- Warhead: 10 MIRV thermonuclear
- Blast yield: 100–200 kt each
- Engine: Three-stage Solid-fuel rocket
- Operational range: 8,300 kilometres (5,200 mi)
- Guidance system: Astro-inertial guidance
- Accuracy: 500 metres (1,600 ft) CEP

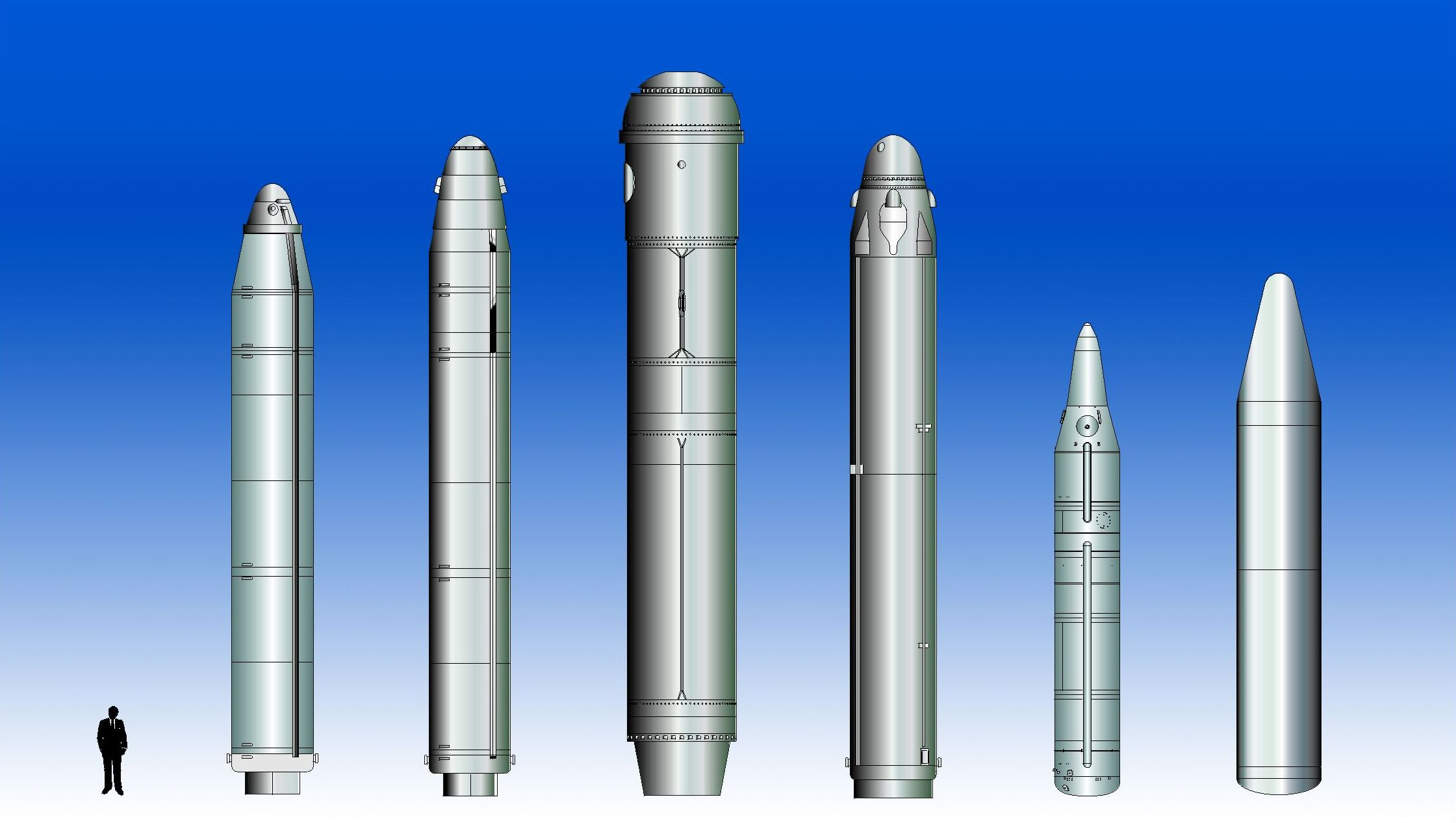
Submarine-based missiles: R-29, R-29R, R-39, R-29RМ, CSS-NX-3, JL-2

The R-39 (Russian: Р-39; NATO reporting name: SS-N-20 Sturgeon; bilateral arms control designation: RSM-52) was a submarine-launched ballistic missile (SLBM) that served with the Soviet Navy from its introduction in 1983 until 1991, after which it served with the Russian Navy until 2004. The missile had GRAU indices of 3M65, 3M20, and 3R65. It was carried on board Typhoon-class submarines.

An intercontinental missile, the R-39 had a three-stage solid-fuel boost design with a liquid-fuel post-boost unit carrying up to ten multiple independently targetable reentry vehicle warheads. Like other SLBMs the initial launch was powered by a gas generator in the bottom of the firing tube. During the missile's passage through the water additional motors produce a gaseous wall around the missile, reducing hydrodynamic resistance. The launch system was designated "D-19".

== Development ==
Development work began at NII Mashinostroyeniya in 1971 and the design gained official approval in 1973. Initial test flights from 1979 found problems in the solid-fuel boost engines, over half of the early flights failed. Later tests aboard a modified Typhoon-class submarine were more successful and deployment began in May 1983, with 20 missiles in each submarine. At full deployment, 120 missiles were deployed with 1,200 total warheads.

Under the terms of the START I and START II treaties, from 1996 a number of R-39 missiles were destroyed. Throughout the 1990s, Typhoon class submarines and the R-39 missiles they carried were gradually withdrawn from service. All the missiles were decommissioned by 2004 and all the Typhoon class submarines have been retired.

A successor design, R-39M Grom (Russian: Гром, Thunder)/RSM-52V/SS-N-28 for D-19UTTKh launch system, suffered a succession of testing failures and was cancelled.

== Operators ==
=== Former operators ===
Russia

- Russian Navy

Soviet Union

- Soviet Navy

== See also ==
- R-39M – (Russia)
- R-29 – (Soviet Union)
- R-29RM – (Soviet Union)
- R-29RMU Sineva – (Russia)
- R-29RMU2 Lajner – (Russia)
- RSM-56 Bulava – (Russia)
- JL-2 – (China)
- JL-3 – (China)
- UGM-133 Trident II – (United States)
- M45 – (France)
- M51 – (France)
- K-6 – (India)
- Pukguksong-5 – (North Korea)
