= Borei-class submarine =

Nuclear powered ballistic missile submarine built for Russian Navy

- Borei-class SSBN profile (project 955)

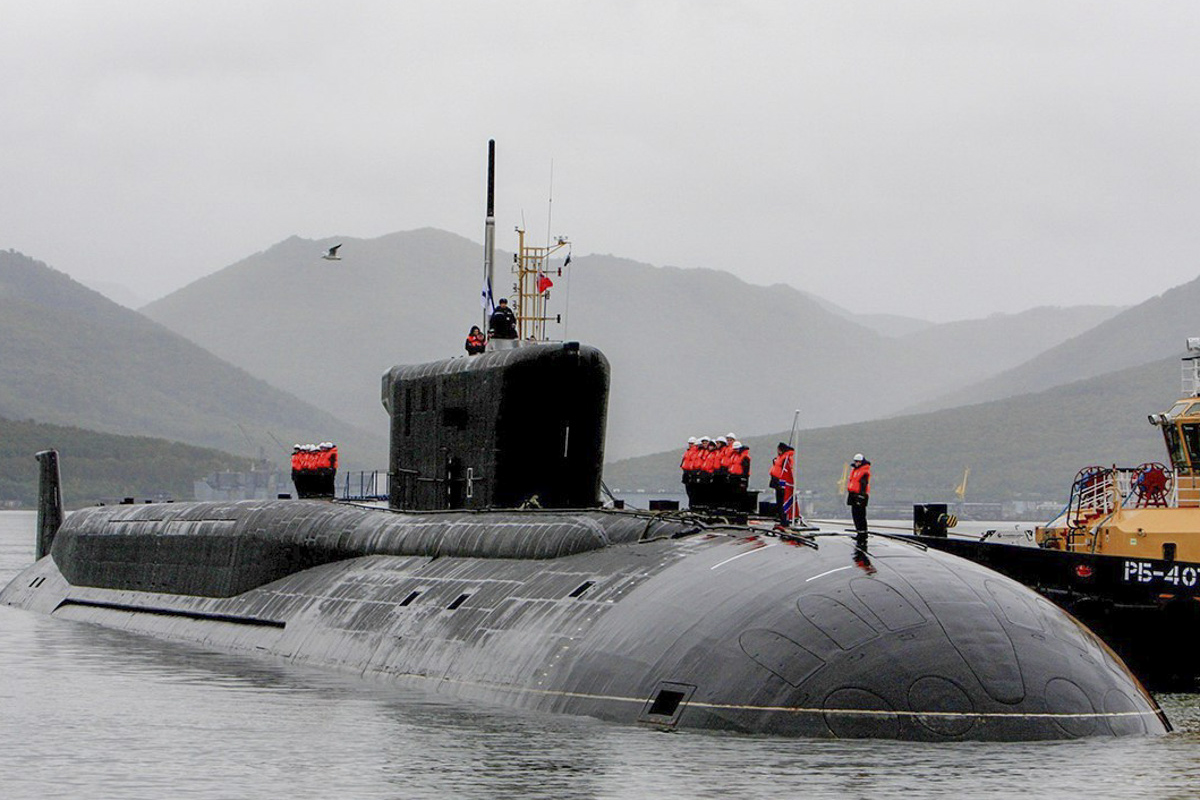
- K-550 Alexander Nevsky

Class overview
- Name: Borei class
- Builders: Sevmash, designed by Rubin
- Operators: Russian Navy
- Preceded by: Delta IV class, Typhoon class
- Succeeded by: Arcturus class
- Cost: US$713 million
- Built: 1996–present
- In commission: 2013–present
- Planned: 12
- Building: 2
- Completed: 8
- Active: 8

General characteristics
- Type: nuclear-powered ballistic missile submarine
- Displacement: 14,720 t (14,488 long tons) surfaced; 24,000 t (23,621 long tons) submerged
- Length: 170 m (557 ft 9 in)
- Beam: 13.5 m (44 ft 3 in)
- Draught: 10 m (32 ft 10 in)
- Propulsion: 1 × ОК-650V nuclear reactor; 1 × Steam turbine, 50,000 SHP; 1 × Pump-jet
- Speed: Submerged: 29 knots (54 km/h; 33 mph); Surfaced: 15 knots (28 km/h; 17 mph)
- Range: Unlimited
- Test depth: 400 metres (1,300 ft)
- Complement: 107 total crew
- Armament: 16 × RSM-56 Bulava SLBMs with 6 MIRV warheads (project 955 and 955A); 8 x 533mm torpedo tubes or 6 × 533mm torpedo tubes (BOREI-A); 6 x 533mm external Special Purpose External Tubes (SPETS) REPS-324 Shlagbaum anti-torpedo defense system; RPK-2 Vyuga anti-submarine/ship missiles

The Borei class, alternate transliteration Borey, Russian designation Project 955 Borei and Project 955A Borei-A (Russian: Борей, lit. 'Boreas', NATO reporting name Dolgorukiy), are a series of nuclear-powered ballistic missile submarines being constructed by Sevmash for the Russian Navy. The class has been replacing the steadily retiring Russian Navy Delta III and Delta IV classes and fully retired (as of February 2023) Typhoon, all three classes being Soviet-era submarines.

Despite being a replacement for many types of SSBNs, Borei-class submarines are much smaller than those of the Typhoon class in both displacement and crew (24,000 tons submerged opposed to 48,000 tons and 107 personnel as opposed to 160 for the Typhoons). In terms of class, they are more accurately a follow-on for the Delta IV-class SSBNs.

== History ==
The first design work on the project started in the mid-1980s and the construction of the first vessel started in 1996. Previously, a short-lived, smaller parallel design appeared in 1980s with designation Project 935 Borei II. A new submarine-launched ballistic missile (SLBM) called the R-39UTTH Bark was developed in parallel. However, the work on this missile was abandoned and a new missile, the RSM-56 Bulava, was designed. The submarine needed to be redesigned to accommodate the new missile, and the design name was changed to Project 955. The vessels were developed by Rubin Design Bureau and are being built by Russia's Northern shipyard Sevmash in Severodvinsk.

It was reported in 2013 that the arrival of the Borei class will enable the Russian Navy to resume strategic patrols in southern latitudes that had not seen a Russian missile submarine for 20 years.

=== Launch and trials ===
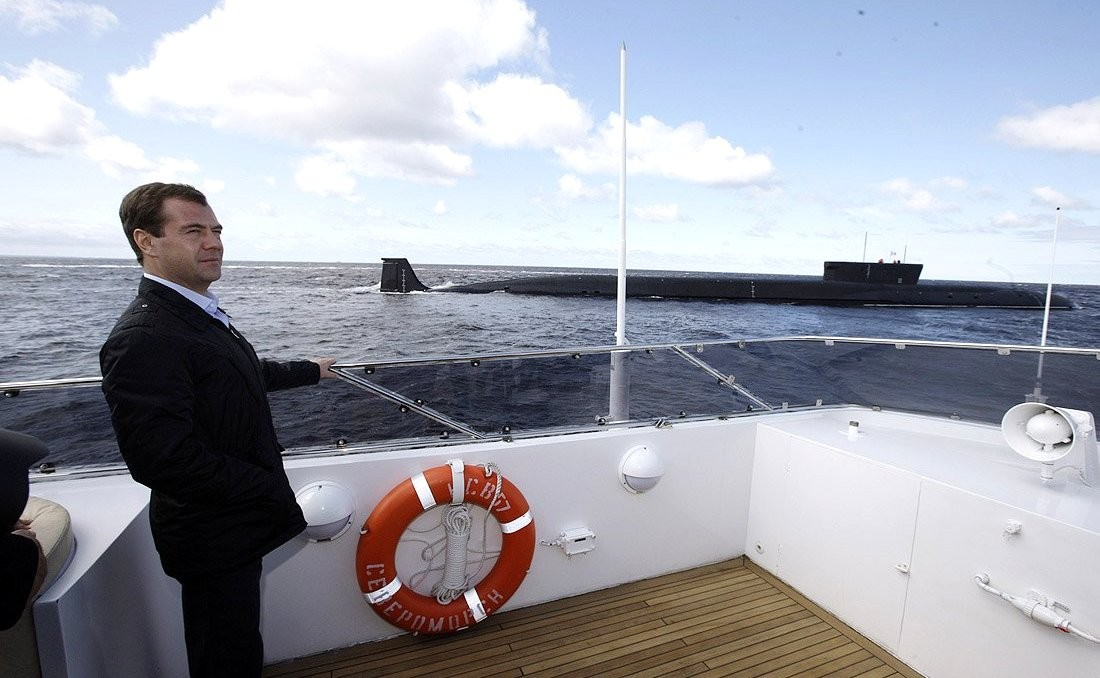
Then President Dmitry Medvedev with the submarine Yury Dolgorukiy in the background

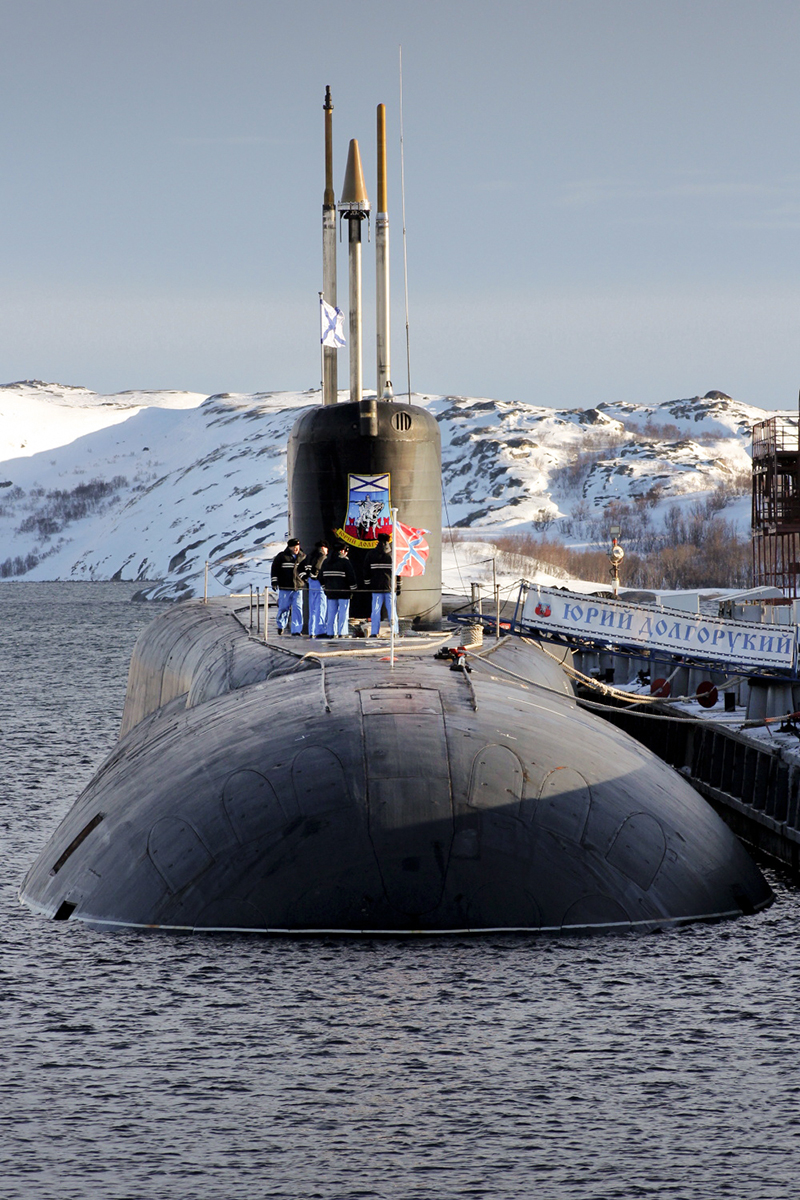
Yury Dolgorukiy in Severomorsk

The launch of the first submarine of the class, Yury Dolgorukiy (Юрий Долгорукий), was scheduled for 2002 but was delayed because of budget constraints. The vessel was eventually rolled out of its construction hall on 15 April 2007 in a ceremony attended by many senior military and industrial personnel. Yuriy Dolgorukiy was the first Russian strategic missile submarine to be launched in seventeen years since the end of the Cold War. The planned contingent of eight strategic submarines was expected to be commissioned within the next decade, with five Project 955 planned for purchase through 2015.

Yuriy Dolgorukiy was not put into the water until February 2008. On 21 November 2008 the reactor on Yuriy Dolgorukiy was activated and on 19 June 2009, the submarine began its sea trials in the White Sea. By July 2009, it had yet to be armed with Bulava missiles and was therefore not fully operational, although it had been ready for sea trials on 24 October 2008.

On 28 September 2010 Yuriy Dolgorukiy completed company sea trials. By late October the Russian Pacific Fleet was fully prepared to host Russia's new Borei-class strategic nuclear-powered submarines. It is expected that four subs will be deployed in the Northern Fleet and four subs in the Pacific Fleet. On 9 November 2010 Yuriy Dolgorukiy passed all sea trials directed to new equipment and systems.

Initially, the plan was to conduct the first torpedo launches during the ongoing state trials in December 2010 and then in the same month conduct the first launch of the main weapon system, RSM-56 Bulava SLBM. The plan was then postponed to mid-summer 2011 due to ice conditions in the White Sea.

On 2 December 2010 the second Borei-class submarine, Alexander Nevskiy, was moved to a floating dock in Sevmash shipyard. There the final preparations took place before the submarine was launched. The submarine was launched on 6 December 2010 and began sea trials on 24 October 2011.

On 28 June 2011 a Bulava missile was launched for the first time from Yuriy Dolgorukiy. The test was announced as a success. After long delays finally the lead vessel, Yuriy Dolgorukiy, joined the Russian Navy on 10 January 2013. The official ceremony raising the Russian Navy colors on the submarine was led by Russian Defence Minister Sergei Shoigu. It was actively deployed in 2014 after a series of exercises.

== Design ==
Cross sections

Borei class includes a compact and integrated hydrodynamically efficient hull for reduced broadband noise and the first ever use of pump-jet propulsion on a Russian nuclear submarine. Russian news service TASS claimed the noise level is to be five times lower when compared to the third-generation nuclear-powered Akula-class submarines and two times lower than that of the U.S. Virginia-class submarines. The acoustic signature of Borei is significantly stealthier than that of the previous generations of Russian SSBNs, but it has been reported that their hydraulic pumps become noisier after a relatively short period of operation, reducing the stealth capabilities of the submarine.

The Borei submarines are approximately 170 metres (560 ft) long, 13 metres (43 ft) in diameter, and have a maximum submerged speed of at least 46 kilometres per hour (25 kn; 29 mph). They are equipped with a floating rescue chamber designed to fit the whole crew. Smaller than the Typhoon class, the Boreis were initially reported to carry 12 missiles but are able to carry 16 because the 36-ton Bulava SLBM (a modified version of the Topol-M ICBM) weighs less than the originally proposed R-39UTTH Bark. Cost was estimated in 2010 at some ₽23 billion (US$734 million, equivalent to US$863 million in 2020 terms). In comparison, the cost of an Ohio-class SSBN was around US$2 billion per boat (1997 prices, equivalent to over US$3 billion in 2020 terms).

Each Borei is constructed with 1.3 million components and mechanisms. Its construction requires 17,000 tons of metal, which is 50% more than the Eiffel Tower. The total length of piping is 109 km and the length of wiring is 600 km. Ten thousand rubber plates cover the hull of the boat.

== Versions ==
=== Project 955A (Borei-A) ===
Borei-A variant

Units of the Project 955A include improved communication and detection systems, improved acoustic signature and have major structural changes such as addition of all moving rudders and vertical endplates to the hydroplanes for higher maneuverability, and a different sail geometry. Besides, they are equipped with hydraulic jets and improved screws that allow them to sail at nearly 30 knots while submerged with minimal noise. Although first reported to carry 20 Bulava SLBMs, the 955A will be armed with 16 SLBMs with 6 to 10 nuclear warheads atop each, just like the project 955 submarines.

The contract for five modified 955A submarines was delayed several times due to price dispute between the Russian Defence Ministry and the United Shipbuilding Corporation. The contract was formally signed on 28 May 2012.

The first 955A submarine, Knyaz Vladimir, was laid down on 30 July 2012, during a ceremony attended by the Russian President Vladimir Putin. Two additional project 955A submarines were laid down in 2014, one in late 2015, and one in late 2016.

On 17 November 2017, the fourth Borei-class submarine and the first of the improved Project 955A, Knyaz Vladimir, was launched.

On 25 October 2022, the first photo of Generalissimus Suvorov, the sixth vessel in the class, were published while performing sea trials. On 7 November, all trials were finished and she was being prepared for commissioning.

According to Sevmash official, Vitaliy Bukovskiy, all Borei-A submarines are to be equipped with aspen banyas able to accommodate 3–4 people.

=== Project 955B (Borei-B) ===
The Project 955B was expected to feature a new water jet propulsion system, an upgraded hull, and new noise reduction technology. The concept design was to be initiated by the Rubin Design Bureau in 2018 and four project 955B boats were proposed with the first unit to be delivered to the Russian Navy in 2026. However, the project wasn't reportedly included in the Russia's State Armament Programme for 2018–2027 due to cost-efficiency. Instead, six more Borei-A submarines were to be built after 2023. According to a 2018 report, Russia's State Armament Programme for 2018–2027 includes construction of two more Borei-A submarines by 2028. The construction should take place at Sevmash starting in 2024 with deliveries to the Russian Navy in 2026 and 2027 respectively.

=== Borei-K ===
A proposed version armed with cruise missiles instead of SLBMs, similar to the American Ohio-class nuclear-powered cruise missile submarines (SSGNs), is under consideration by the Russian Defence Ministry.

== Planned successor ==
At the Army-2022 expo, the Rubin Design Bureau revealed a new ballistic missile submarine design, intended to replace the Borei class. The Arcturus class will have an angled hull design, similar to the Dreadnought class, intended to make the submarine harder to detect. The submarine will also contain 12 missile silos, and will be able to carry the Surrogat-V AUV, which is an anti-submarine warfare drone. It will also have 20% lower displacement compared to current ballistic missile submarines, with a planned crew of around 100 people, and being 134 meters in length.

On 21 June 2023, the Rubin Design Bureau announced that the Arcturus class would begin replacing the Borei class from 2037 onwards.

== Units ==
#	Name	Project	Laid down	Launched	Commissioned	Fleet	Status
K-535	Yury Dolgorukiy	955	2 November 1996	12 February 2008	29 December 2012	Northern	Active
K-550	Alexander Nevsky	955	19 March 2004	13 December 2010	23 December 2013	Pacific	Active
K-551	Vladimir Monomakh	955	19 March 2006	30 December 2012	19 December 2014	Pacific	Active
K-549	Knyaz Vladimir	955А	30 July 2012	17 November 2017	12 June 2020	Northern	Active
K-552	Knyaz Oleg	955А	27 July 2014	16 July 2020	21 December 2021	Pacific	Active
K-553	Generalissimus Suvorov	955А	26 December 2014	25 December 2021	29 December 2022	Pacific	Active
K-554	Imperator Aleksandr III	955А	18 December 2015	29 December 2022	11 December 2023	Pacific	Active
K-555	Knyaz Pozharskiy	955А	23 December 2016	3 February 2024	24 July 2025	Northern	Active
	Dmitry Donskoy	955A	23 August 2021	2026	2026	Northern	Under construction
	Knyaz Potemkin	955A	23 August 2021		2028	Northern	Under construction

== See also ==
- List of Soviet and Russian submarine classes
- Future of the Russian Navy
- List of submarine classes in service
- Submarine-launched ballistic missile

== Bibliography ==
- Polmar, Norman (2026). Submarines of the Russian and Soviet Navies: 1946–2026. Schiffer Publishing. ISBN 978-0-7643-7083-0.
