= R-29 (missile) =

Submarine-launched ballistic missile

R-29 /RSM-40
- Type: SLBM
- Place of origin: Soviet Union/Russia

Service history
- In service: 1974–present
- Used by: Russian Navy

Production history
- Designer: Makeyev Rocket Design Bureau

Specifications
- Mass: 32,800 kg (72,300 lb)
- Length: 13.2 m (43 ft)
- Diameter: 1.8m
- Propellant: liquid
- Guidance system: astro-inertial

The R-29 (Russian: Р-29) is a family of Soviet submarine-launched ballistic missiles, designed by Makeyev Rocket Design Bureau. All variants use astro-inertial guidance systems.

== Variants ==
=== R-29 ===
- Deployment date: 1974
- Manufacturer designation: 4K75
- DoD designation: SS-N-8 Mod 1
- ASCC designation: "Sawfly"
- SALT designation: RSM-40
- Submarine: Delta I and Delta II
- Total Mass: 32,800 kg
- Core Diameter: 1.80 m
- Total Length: 13.20 m
- Span: 1.80 m
- Payload: 1100 kg
- Maximum range: 7,700 km (4,784 miles)
- Number of Standard Warheads: 1 (800 kt)
- Number of stages: 2

=== R-29R ===
- Deployment date: 1978
- Manufacturer designation: 4K75R
- DoD designation: SS-N-18 Mod 1
- ASCC designation: "Stingray"
- SALT designation: RSM-50
- Submarine: Delta III
- Total Mass: 35,300 kg
- Core Diameter: 1.80 m
- Total Length: 14.40 m
- Span: 1.80 m
- Payload: 1650 kg
- Maximum range: 6,500 km (4,038 miles)
- Number of Standard Warheads: 3 (500 kt)
- Number of stages: 2

=== R-29RK ===
- Manufacturer designation: 4K75RK
- DoD designation: SS-N-18 Mod 2
- ASCC designation: "Stingray"
- SALT designation: RSM-50
- Submarine: Delta III
- Total Mass: 34,388 kg
- Core Diameter: 1.80 m
- Total Length: 14.40 m
- Span: 1.80 m
- Maximum range: 6,500 km (4,038 miles)
- Number of Standard Warheads: 7 (100 kt)
- Number of stages: 2

=== R-29RL ===
- Manufacturer designation: 4K75RL
- DoD designation: SS-N-18 Mod 3
- ASCC designation: "Stingray"
- SALT designation: RSM-50
- Submarine: Delta III
- Total Mass: 35,300 kg
- Core Diameter: 1.80 m
- Total Length: 14.09 m
- Span: 1.80 m
- Maximum range: 9,000 km (5,592 miles)
- Number of Standard Warheads: 1 (450 kt)
- Number of stages: 2

== Operators ==
Russia

- The Russian Navy is the only operator of the R-29 missile family. Modernized and active variants are the R-29RMU Sineva and R-29RMU2 Layner. As of 2023, 64 R-29RMU/RMU2 on Delta-class ballistic missile submarines:
- Delta IV class has 16 (R-29RMU/RMU2) per ship.
  - K-51 Verkhoturye
  - K-114 Tula
  - K-18 Karelia
  - K-407 Novomoskovsk

=== Former operators ===
Soviet Union
- Soviet Navy

== See also ==
- RSM-56 Bulava – (Russia)
- Kanyon – (Russia)
- UGM-133 Trident II – (United States)
- M45 (missile) – (France)
- M51 (missile) – (France)
- JL-1 – (China)
- JL-2 – (China)
- K Missile family – (India)
- Pukguksong-1 – (North Korea)
- R-39 Rif – (Soviet Union)
- R-39M – (Russia)
