= Pukguksong-6 =

North Korean submarine-launched ballistic missile

Pukguksong-6 (presumed)
- Type: Submarine-launched ballistic missile
- Place of origin: North Korea

Production history
- Designed: 2022
- Manufacturer: North Korea
- No. built: 4 prototypes

Specifications
- Length: 13.2 m (43 ft)
- Width: 2.21 m (7.3 ft)
- Warhead: Nuclear warhead MIRV-capable (unconfirmed)
- Propellant: solid fuel
- Operational range: 4,000–12,000 km (2,500–7,500 mi)
- Launch platform: Submarine (planned)

The Pukguksong-6 (Korean: 북극성-6; lit. 'Polaris 6') is presumed to be the official designation of a North Korean solid-fueled submarine-launched ballistic missile (SLBM) first unveiled in 2022.

== Description ==
Images of the Pukguksong-6
- At the 25 April 2022 military parade

The Pukguksong-6 is a solid-propelled missile probably derived from Pukguksong-5. It is longer than Pukguksong-4 and Pukguksong-5. The missile's estimated length and diameter is 13.2 m (43 ft) and 2.21 m (7.3 ft) respectively and likely uses three-stage design. However, German analyst Norbert Brügge claimed the missile to be a two-stage silo-based missile with a longer first stage compared to Pukguksong-5.

As an improved version of Pukguksong-5, Pukguksong-6 may have a much longer range and capability of carrying multiple warheads, and is believed to be able to carry three to four reentry vehicles. The missile is also said to be theoretically capable of hitting the continental United States, with an estimated range of 4,000–12,000 km (2,500–7,500 mi).

The missile is also claimed to be the largest SLBM produced by North Korea, as well as the North Korea's largest solid-fueled ballistic missile as of September 2022.

The Pukguksong-6 may be intended to be launched from a 3,000-ton submarine under construction as of 2022, as well as a nuclear-powered submarine under construction as of 2025.

== History ==
At the 8th Congress of the Workers' Party of Korea held in January 2021, North Korean leader Kim Jong Un confirmed that an intercontinental-range SLBM was in development.

North Korea first displayed Pukguksong-6 on 25 April 2022 during a military parade. Four missiles were placed on 6-axle trucks. North Korea did not reveal the official designation, and the Pukguksong-6 designation remains unconfirmed. It is also possible that the missile is internally called Pukguksong-6S.

A small-scale model of the missile appeared at a banquet attended by Kim Jong Un on 27 August 2023.

In February 2026, North Korea revealed a plan of supplying weapons to their armed forces, including sea-based ICBMs, suggesting continued effort to develop and deploy Pukguksong-6.

There has been no known test for this missile so far.

== See also ==
- Pukguksong-3 – (North Korea)
- K-6 – (India)
- M51 – (France)
- RSM-56 Bulava – (Russia)
- UGM-133 Trident II – (United States)
- JL-3 – (China)
