= R-39M =

- Type: Strategic SLBM

Service history
- In service: cancelled

Production history
- Designer: Makeyev Rocket Design Bureau

Specifications
- Length: 16.1 m
- Diameter: 2.42 m
- Warhead: 10
- Engine: solid fuel rocket
- Operational range: >8,000 km
- Guidance system: Astro-inertial
- Accuracy: 500 metres CEP (western estimate)

R-39UTTH Bark, NATO reporting name SS-NX-28, was a Russian submarine-launched ballistic missile. The missile was an upgraded version of the R-39 missile that was designed for the Typhoon class. The new missile was to be carried by the new Russian nuclear submarines of the Borei class. The third test launch of a prototype R-39M on 25 November 1998 resulted in a catastrophic failure of the SLBM's booster. The missile exploded roughly 200 meters after take-off from its ground-based launch facility. Having failed its first three test firings the project was ordered abandoned by the Russian Security Council. The missile was later replaced by the Bulava and Layner missile systems.

== See also ==
- RSM-56 Bulava – (Russia)
- UGM-133 Trident II – (United States)
- M51 – (France)
- JL-3 – (China)
- Pukguksong-6 – (North Korea)
