= Kura Missile Test Range =

Endpoint of missile tests conducted by the Russian military

- Near Klyuchi in Russia

Site information
- Type: ICBM test range
- Owner: Russian Armed Forces
- Operator: Russian Aerospace Forces (VKS)
- Open to the public: No

Location
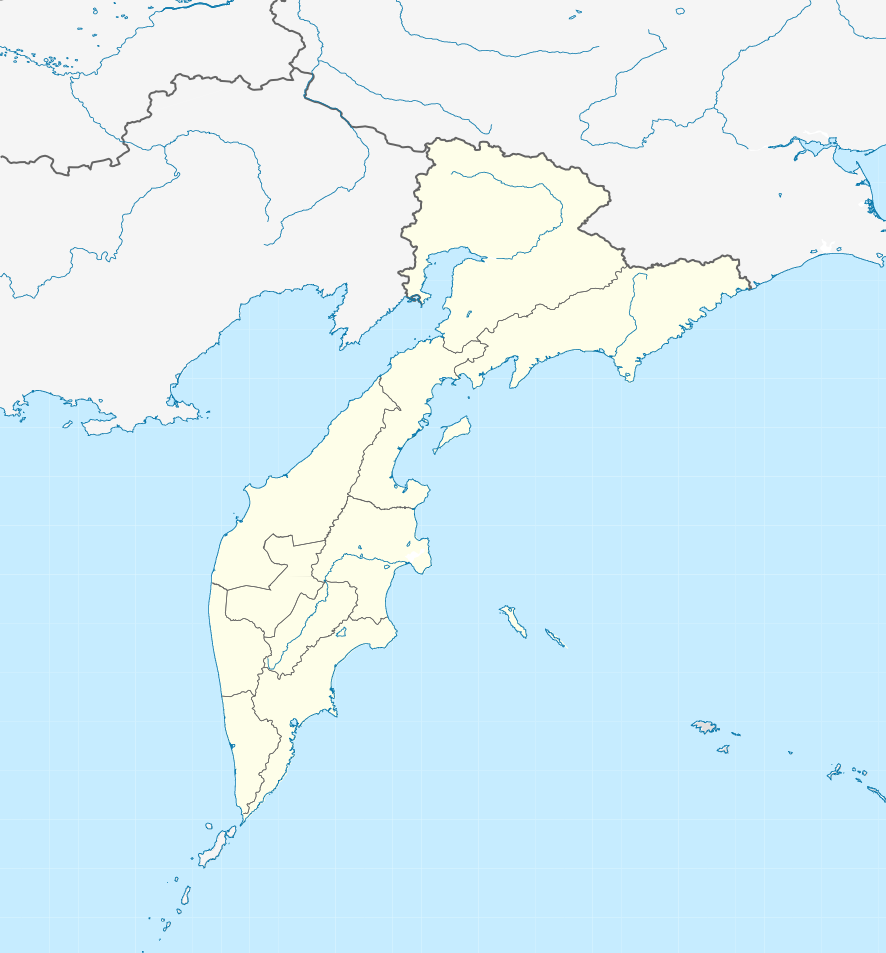
- Location in Russia Location in Kamchatka Krai, Russia
- Coordinates: 57°20′00″N 161°50′00″E

Site history
- Built: 1955

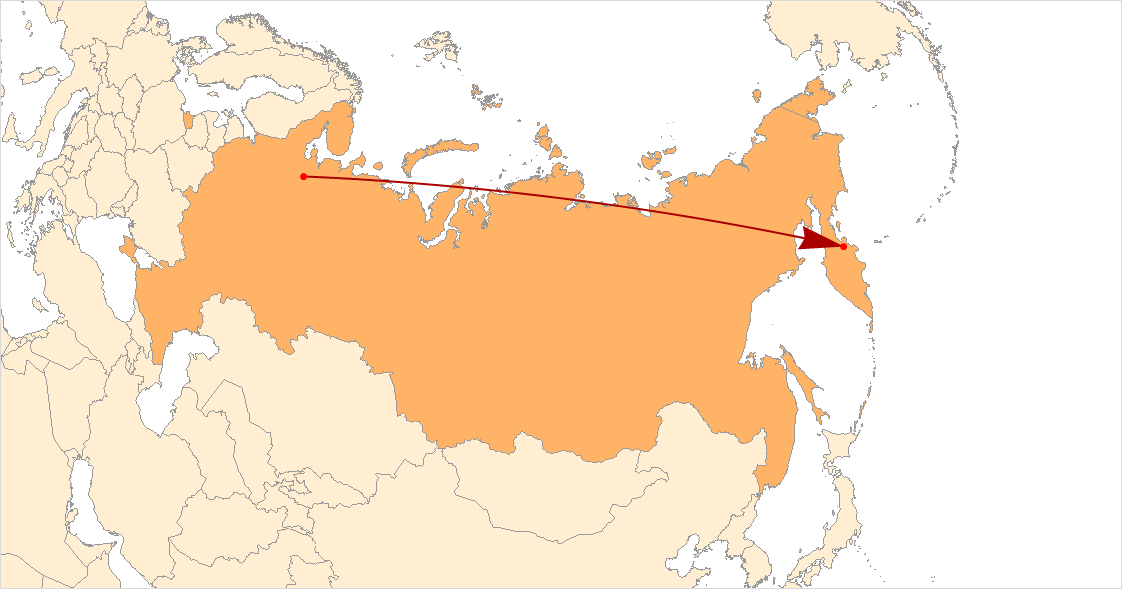
General trajectory of missiles from the Plesetsk Cosmodrome to the Kura Missile Test Range – 5,700 km (3,100 nmi; 3,500 mi)

Kura Missile Test Range (Russian: Ракетный полигон Кура́), originally known as Kama, is a Russian intercontinental ballistic missile impact area located in northern Kamchatka Krai in the Russian Far East. It is the destination for ballistic missiles which are test fired from other centers, and was chosen due to its remoteness and distance. It is 130 kilometers (81 mi) northeast of the settlement of Klyuchi and the military townlet is called Klyuchi-1, after the nearest settlement.

== History ==
The range was developed beginning in 1955 and was operational in 1957. The first impact occurred on 21 August 1957, and was followed by 136 impacts through 1964.

Although the range is a test site for intercontinental ballistic missiles, which are controlled by the Russian Strategic Rocket Forces, the range is administratively under Plesetsk Cosmodrome, and consequently is part of the Russian Space Forces.

Kura Missile Testing Range remains active in 2024. An ICBM was launched there on 25 Oct 2023, after the Russian Parliament withdrew from the 1996 Nuclear Test Ban treaty in response to the failure by the USA to ratify the Treaty for 28 years.

It was reported that the strategic nuclear submarine Yury Dolgorukiy of Project 955 (Borei) on Wednesday, 29 October 2014 20:27 MSK (17:27 UTC) successfully conducted its fifth launch of Bulava submarine-launched ballistic missile (SLBM) at Kura firing range. On 30 October 2013 Russia conducted a large-scale exercise to check the readiness of its strategic forces. The Strategic Rocket Forces conducted two ICBM launches – a Topol missile was launched from the Plesetsk test site and an R-36M2 (RS-10V/SS-18) missile from a silo in Dombarovskiy. Both missiles delivered their warheads to the Kura test site in Kamchatka. Previous impact was recorded at 10:15 (06:15 GMT) on Wednesday 23 May 2012 when a new as yet unnamed ballistic missile designed to evade the US missile shield was tested. The missile was fired from a mobile launcher on the Plesetsk range. The warhead was delivered successfully to its designated area on the Kura range on Kamchatka. A Bulava missile, launched from submarine Dimitri Donskoi, landed at Kura in October 2010. Test launches of R-29RMU Sineva and RT-2PM2 Topol-M missiles also frequently target the Kura Missile Test Range.

== United States surveillance ==
The Kura range attracted intense interest from United States intelligence agencies in 1957. There was early speculation that missiles were being launched from this range, but this was settled by information from Lockheed U-2 missions in summer 1957 which flew directly over the range and could find no launch infrastructure. The study noted that impacts in the nearby water were likely, and that the Soviets were expected to install sonic detection systems to measure water impacts. The missions revealed a regiment of seven Mil Mi-4 helicopters based at Klyuchi which provided logistical support for the range.

Up to 1994, the United States maintained Eareckson Air Station (formerly Shemya Air Force Base) only 935 km (581 mi) away, equipped with radars and aircraft to monitor impacts at Kura. One of these radars, Cobra Dane, was fielded in 1977 at Shemya specifically for this purpose.
