= Submarine-launched satellite =

There have been a number of ventures into submarine-launched satellites. The advantage of launching a satellite from a submarine compared to from land is that the launch vehicle can reach a large number of different inclinations and could increase its performance to low Earth orbit by launching from equatorial sites. Missiles used for this purpose include the Volna and the Shtil', as well as theoretically the R-39 Rif. Submarines used include Delta-class submarines.

== Attempts ==
The first known attempt to launch a satellite from a submarine was conducted on July 7, 1998, when a Russian nuclear submarine (the K-407 Novomoskovsk) launched the Tubsat-N in Barents Sea using a Shtil' rocket. Tubsat-N was a German miniaturized satellite for communication designed by Technische Universität Berlin.

Another launch was conducted on May 29, 2006, using a Shtil 1 rocket.

== See also ==
- Air launch to orbit
- Sea Launch
