= Decommissioning of Russian nuclear-powered vessels =

The decommissioning of Russian nuclear-powered vessels is an issue of major concern to the United States and to Scandinavian countries near Russia. From 1950 to 2003, the Soviet Union and its major successor state, Russia, constructed the largest nuclear-powered navy in the world, with more ships than all other navies combined: 248 submarines (91 attack submarines, 62 cruise missile submarines, 91 ballistic missile submarines and four research submarines), four Kirov-class battlecruisers, and a missile test ship, as well as nine icebreakers. Many were or are powered by two reactors each, bringing the total to 468 reactors.

With the end of the Cold War and chronic under-funding of its navy, Russia decommissioned many of these vessels, and according to one November 2008 report, intended to scrap all decommissioned submarines (over 200) by 2012. However, the safety records of the Soviet and Russian navies and Russian governmental budgetary constraints are matters of great concern. Ships awaiting decommissioning receive little maintenance, and there are insufficient waste storage facilities, raising worries about possible ecological damage from accidents or improper storage.

== Overview ==
In the midst of the Cold War, the Soviet Union was more concerned about building up its fleet than making provisions for the disposal of aging nuclear-powered vessels. It was not until 1986 that "the Central Committee of the Communist party and the Supreme Soviet ratified Decree No. 095-296 which laid down formal procedures for decommissioning and dismantling inactive nuclear submarines." By this time, the first generation November-class submarines had been in service for over 20 years. To put this figure in perspective, the service life expectancy of more modern Delta IVs is estimated to be between 20 and 30 years with regular overhauls, or 10 to 15 without.

Progress was hindered by the large number of government bodies involved, resulting in much confusion and competition. The breakup of the Soviet Union in 1991 further complicated matters. Russia assumed responsibility for all of the Soviet Navy's nuclear-powered ships, but agreements between agencies responsible for decommissioning had to be renegotiated.

The major issues are financial. In 1995, a Northern Fleet submarine based near Murmansk nearly suffered a nuclear meltdown when power was cut off due to unpaid electricity bills. Decommissioned vessels are often left in floating storage until funds can be allocated for their dismantling. As of November 2001, "up to 40% of the decommissioned submarines have been in floating storage without much maintenance for more than 10 years".

The situation has caused such concern that the United States, United Kingdom, Japan and Scandinavian countries have contributed funding and assistance. The Arctic Military Environmental Cooperation (AMEC) was a joint Norwegian, Russian, and American government consortium (which the UK later joined) set up to deal with military environmental issues, mainly the dismantling of Russia's nuclear submarine fleet in Europe. After the "somewhat acrimonious dissolution" of AMEC, the Norwegian and British governments shared the £3.9 million cost of dismantling a Russian November-class submarine. Under AMEC's successor, Cooperative Threat Reduction, the British government financed the dismantling of two Oscar I submarines. The Nunn–Lugar Cooperative Threat Reduction program has been responsible for the deactivation and destruction of many weapons, including 33 nuclear submarines. With the "Star of Hope" program, Japan funded the dismantling of five Victor III and one Charlie I submarine in the Far East.

Another critical issue is security. Russian sailors have been convicted and jailed for two 1993 thefts of highly enriched uranium from fuel rods. In 1994, Russian officials caught two North Korean agents trying to buy submarine dismantlement schedules.

== Reactor disposal ==
Removing the fuel from a nuclear reactor requires a specially trained team. A reactor must first be cooled down for at least three years after its final shutdown. The coolant is then removed, followed by the hull above the reactor, and then the top shield. The fuel elements are extracted and transported by ship and then rail to a storage facility.

The still heavily radioactive reactor compartment can then be cut away. (Most Russian submarines have two reactors, "in separate rooms, but in the same compartment.") Due to a lack of land storage facilities, two adjoining emptied compartments, one forward and one aft, are usually cut off as well to provide buoyancy for storage on water. In some cases, however, only the reactor compartment is removed, and pontoons attached to keep it afloat. A third method involves filling the reactor compartment with polystyrene for buoyancy. "Reactor compartments from Polyarny and other shipyards at the Kola Peninsula and in Severodvinsk, Arkhangelsk county, are towed to Sayda Bay".

On 10 August 1985, control rods were incorrectly removed from a Victor-class submarine during defueling at Chazma Bay naval yard outside Vladivostok, resulting in an explosion, the "release of large amounts of radioactivity", and ten deaths. In addition to this Victor, five other submarines have damaged cores, preventing their defueling by normal methods.

A March 1993 Russian government report acknowledged that "during the period [from] 1965 to 1988, the Northern Fleet had dumped four reactor compartments with eight reactors (three containing damaged fuel) in the Abrosimov Gulf in 20 to 40 meters of water." Six other compartments, containing nine reactors in all, had also been dumped into the water in the 1960s and 1970s.

== Submarines ==
=== November class ===
The surviving November-class submarines were decommissioned between 1986 and 1990. Several of them have been scrapped already. All of the survivors remain laid-up hulks in Russian naval bases (K-14, K-42, K-115 and K-133 of the Pacific Fleet, as well as K-11 and K-21 of the Northern Fleet). There are plans to convert the first submarine of the class (K-3) into a museum ship in Saint Petersburg, but the hulk remains in Polyarny, Murmansk Oblast, due to economic reasons and the "radiophobia" of some ecological organizations.

K-5 was defueled at the naval yard at Polyarny in November 1966. According to one source, the shipyard "likely dismantled" the submarine the same year.

K-27 was an experimental attack submarine of the November class that went into service in October 1963. A reactor malfunction on 24 May 1968 resulted in the release of radioactive gas into the engine room and fatal exposure to nine crewmen. The Soviet Navy considered replacing the reactor, but subsequently abandoned the idea, and K-27 was officially decommissioned on 1 February 1979. "The empty spaces of the reactor and equipment associated with the reactor ... were filled with a solidifying radiation-resistant preservative" and K-27 was scuttled off the northeastern coast of Novaya Zemlya on 6 September 1982.

K-159 sank in the Barents Sea on 30 August 2003, while being towed to be scrapped, killing nine crewmen and depositing 800 kilograms (1,800 lb) of reactor fuel on the seabed.

=== Hotel class ===
All eight Hotel-class submarines were decommissioned for scrapping between 1987 and 1991. One undated article placed a Hotel-class submarine at Sevmorput Naval Shipyard No. 35 in Murmansk. As of February 2003, two were reported to be at Russian Shipyard Number 10 at Polyarny.

=== Echo class ===
All 34 Echo-class submarines were decommissioned for scrapping between 1985 and 1995. According to the Federation of American Scientists, one or possibly two Echos was decommissioned in the mid-1980s, and the remaining three or four in 1990. The 29 Echo IIs were all decommissioned by the mid-1990s.

On 23 October 2002, a nuclear submarine caught fire during dismantlement at Sevmorput; according to the Bellona Foundation, it was probably the Echo II-class K-22. Fortunately, the reactor compartment had already been removed, and there was no danger of radioactive contamination.

=== Papa class ===
On 4 June 2010, Voice of Russia reported that K-222, the sole member of the Papa class, had been scrapped at Severodvinsk.

=== Yankee class ===
As a result of the SALT I and START I/II treaties, 33 of the 34 Yankee class were decommissioned, while K-219 was lost on 6 October 1986 after an explosion and fire near Bermuda. The Bellona Foundation reported on 7 February 2003 that:

- K-214 had been dismantled at Sevmash shipyard "as an experiment to determine whether the yard can handle such operations."
- ten were dismantled at Zvezdochka shipyard: K-216, K-415, K-137, K-140, K-210, K-228, K-444, K-221, K-418, and K-32

=== Delta class ===
Some of the Delta IIIs were decommissioned and others put in reserve. Five remain in active service, along with all seven Delta IVs. Delta I-class submarines K-279, K-385, K-472 and K-475, Delta II K-193, and Delta IIIs K-441 and K-424 were all reported dismantled at Zvezdochka shipyard.

=== Charlie class ===
On 4 June 1997, a Charlie "sank in a harbor on the Kamchatka Peninsula". However, a local official reported that the reactor core had already been removed. On 21 November 2005, Russian President Vladimir Putin and Japanese Prime Minister Junichiro Koizumi reached an agreement to dismantle five decommissioned nuclear submarines, among them a Charlie I, the latter "the first project in Kamchatka under the Japan-Russia cooperation framework."

=== Victor class ===
According to some sources, all 16 Victor Is and seven Victor IIs were decommissioned by 1996. One cited "various sources" in estimating that only "somewhere between 8 and 15 [Victor IIIs] had been decommissioned due to lack of funds in the 1999-2000 timeframe" while another placed the number at "about a dozen" (of the 26 built) by 1996.

In February 2003, under the Russian-Japanese "Star of Hope" program, Japan spent $6 million to dismantle a Victor III of Russia's Pacific Fleet; the job was completed in December 2004. Another 20 billion yen ($171 million) was allocated to dismantle four Victor IIIs at the Zvezda shipyard in the town of Bolshoi Kamen and a Charlie I at Vilyuchinsk, Kamchatka (as previously mentioned).

=== Alfa class ===
K-64, the first of seven Alfa-class submarines, joined the Soviet Navy in December 1971. The following year, however, "the K-64 suffered a major reactor problem when the liquid metal in the primary coolant hardened". Her hull was cut in half in 1973–1974 at Sverodvinsk, the forward portion being sent to Leningrad to be used for training, the reactor compartment being kept at Zvezdochka. The remaining boats were decommissioned for scrapping, five in 1990 and one in 1996. As of February 2003, K-463, K-316, K-432 and K-493 had been dismantled at Sevmash, with the remaining two at Bolshaya Lopatka, Zapadnaya Litsa, awaiting the same fate. The Alfa reactors use a liquid metal coolant that must be kept at a temperature over 123°C to avoid solidifying; a 2002 paper reports that the coolant in both K-123 and K-373 has solidified. An Alfa reactor compartment was reported in November 1997 as being at "an open site on Yagry island in Severodvinsk".

=== Oscar class ===
The two Oscar Is were decommissioned in 1996. By 2006, it was reported that their dismantling, funded by the United Kingdom under the Cooperative Threat Reduction program, had been completed at Sevmash shipyard. Two or possibly three Oscar IIs "were inactivated in the late 1990s, and as of mid-2000 were laid up awaiting disposal."

=== Typhoon class ===
TK-13 was withdrawn from active service in 1997, and scrapped in 2007–2009, "funded by Russia, USA and Canada as part of the ['Global partnership' program]". In September 2011, the Russian defense ministry announced it will decommission and dismantle the three remaining boats to comply with the START III treaty and because its newer Borei-class submarines require smaller crews and are less costly to maintain.

=== Akula class ===
K-284 Akula, the lead ship of the Akula-class submarine, "was decommissioned in 1995 to avoid the expense of a reactor refueling".

== Surface ships ==
NS Lenin, the world's first nuclear-powered surface and civilian ship, was decommissioned in 1989. It was subsequently converted into a museum ship.

Of the six Arktika-class icebreakers, two are no longer in service. NS Arktika was taken out of service and had its reactor removed in 2008. NS Sibir was taken out of service in 1992 due to a problem in the vessel's steam generation system. The Barents Observer reported on 3 November 2008 that the Russian authorities were preparing to decommission and scrap Sibir. In 2010, the deputy chief engineer of Atomflot, the Russian nuclear fleet operator, reported that "all radioactive [materials] have been unloaded" from Sibir, but the "decommissioning decision has not been made yet, however."
