= Delta III-class submarine =

Nuclear-powered ballistic missile submarine class

- A Delta III-class submarine

Class overview
- Name: Delta III class
- Builders: Severnoye Mashinostroitelnoye Predpriyatie Severodvinsk
- Operators: Soviet Navy, Russian Navy
- Preceded by: Delta II class
- Succeeded by: Delta IV class & Typhoon class
- Subclasses: Project 09786 Special Purpose Submarine
- Built: 1974–1982
- In service: 1976–present
- Completed: 14
- Active: 1
- Retired: 13

General characteristics
- Type: Submarine
- Displacement: Surfaced: 13,500 tons; Submerged: 18,200 tons
- Length: 166 m (545 ft)
- Beam: 12.3 m (40 ft)
- Draught: 8.7 m (29 ft)
- Depth: Operational: 320 m (1,050 ft); Maximum: 400 m (1,300 ft)
- Propulsion: Reactor system OK-700A (two VM-4S (2*90 MW) PWR) powering 2 steam turbines delivering 44,700 kW (59,900 shp) to 2 five-bladed fixed pitched shrouded propellers
- Speed: Surfaced: 14 knots (26 km/h; 16 mph); Submerged: 24 knots (44 km/h; 28 mph)
- Range: Unlimited, except by food supplies
- Complement: 40 officers, 90 enlisted
- Armament: 16 × RSM-50 R-29R "Vysota" missiles; 4 × bow 533 mm (21 in) torpedo tubes; 16 torpedoes (SET-65, SAET-60M, 53-65K, 53-65M)

The Delta III-class submarine, Soviet designation Project 667BDR Kaľmar (Squid), is a large ballistic missile submarine operated by the Russian Navy. Like other previous Delta-class submarines, the Delta III class is a double hulled design, with a thin low magnetic steel outer hull wrapped around a thicker inner pressure hull.

== Design ==
The technical description and requirements for a new ballistic missile submarine were published in 1972. Development of Project 667BDR was begun at the Rubin Central Design Bureau for Marine Engineering under the direction of main designer Sergeiy Nikiticz Kovalev (Сергей Никитич Ковалёв). The submarine was to be a successor to the project 667BD. The Delta III-class submarines are significantly quieter and have a higher missile section for newer, longer-ranged missiles.

The hull is divided into ten waterproof sections. The first, third, and tenth sections are emergency sections with escape hatches and transverse struts added to increase pressure resistance. A new modular freon firefighting system was installed. A solarium and gymnasium were to be installed to improve living conditions.

The main propulsion system, OK-700A, consists of two pressurized water reactor VM-4S (2×90 MW) with two steam turbines giving 60,000 shaft horsepower (45,000 kW) to two five-bladed, fixed-pitch shrouded propellers with improved hydro-acoustic characteristics. Two back-up TG-3000 turbogenerators were also installed. Average period between refuelling and overhaul is about ten years.

The Delta III class are fitted with a new sonar system, the MGK-400 Rubikon (in submarine K-424, the older MGK-100 Kerch was installed), developed under the leadership of main designer S.M. Shelechov. The Rubikon can operate in infrasound frequencies, and contains automated systems for target classification. Its maximum range in ideal hydrologic conditions is about 200 km (120 mi). The Delta III class are equipped with a new battle management system, the Almaz-BDR (or MVU-JZBDR) torpedo fire control. For improved stealthiness, a new inertial navigation system, Tobol-M-1 (on newer ships Tobol-M-2), with higher accuracy, was installed. Tobol-M works with data from two observatories which are saved for two days, and also contains a hydro-acoustic navigational station (Shmeľ or "Bumblebee"), which allows the submarine to determine its position from hydro-acoustic buoys. The Delta III class includes the Molnija-M communications system, with satellite capabilities provided by the Tsunami subsystem.

In February 1973, State Rocket Center Makayev began development of a new two-stage liquid-fueled ballistic missile R-29R (3M40, RSM-50, SS-N-18). Improvements in the R-29R over the original R-29 include MIRVed capability and upgraded inertial navigation system with satellite-assisted navigation, giving the new missile greater accuracy (~900 m (3,000 ft)), increasing its damage potential against all types of military targets whether "soft" or "hard". Fire control for the R-29R is achieved through the D-9R ballistic missile system, which contains sixteen SLBM tubes, just like the preceding Project 667BD. The Delta III class most often carried 16 of the R-29R (height: 16.635 m (54.58 ft); diameter: 1.8 m (5.9 ft); starting weight: 36.3 tons) missiles each carrying 3 MIRVs (0.2 мт each) with a range of about 6,500 km (4,000 mi). They also can carry R-29RK with 7 (0.1 мт) MIRVs and range of about 6,500 km or R-29RL with single (0.45 мт) warhead and range of about 9,000 km (5,600 mi). Coupled with the R-29R's capabilities and the performance of the D-9R, the Russian Navy possesses, for the first time, the ability to launch any number of its missiles in a single salvo with shorter launch intervals.

The submarines have four 533mm bow torpedo tubes and carry sixteen torpedoes of types SET-65, SAET-60M, 53-65K, 53-65M, or any combination thereof.

== History ==
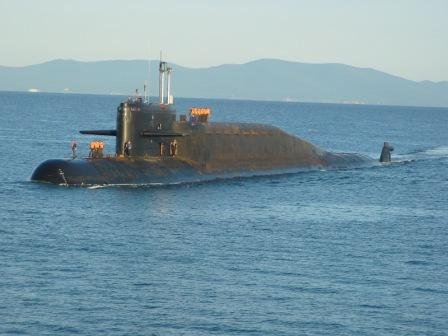
K-433 submarine

The first ship of the class, K-424, was laid down on 30 January 1974 in Severnoye Mashinostroitelnoye Predpriyatie (Sevmash), Severodvinsk, as the last ship of the Delta II class. During construction the new D-9R missile system was integrated into the Delta II hull without any changes in other equipment. The ship was launched on 11 February 1976 and passed sea trials in November 1976. Then tests of the new missile system were started in the White and Barents Seas; 22 missiles were launched (four R-29PL, six R-29R, twelve R-29RK) and the missile system was commissioned in September 1978.

Most submarines served in the Pacific Fleet at Rybachiy submarine base near Petropavlovsk-Kamchatsky. Seven under-ice Arctic voyages and two along the Southern territories were completed since 1980. Under-ice voyages were very difficult. In some places the depth of the sea is less than 50 metres (160 ft) and the thickness of ice about 15 metres (49 ft). That gives only a few metres around the submarine.

Two submarines served in the Northern Fleet at the Gazhiyevo submarine base and three at the Olenya submarine base. From the 1990s all the Northern Fleet subs were stationed at Gazhiyevo.

All Delta III-class submarines passed general overhaul refuelling and upgrade in Zvezdochka shipyard, Severodvinsk, or in Zvezda shipyard, Bolshoy Kamen, since 1991, when the Soviet Union collapsed. An upgraded missile system, D-9R, with lightly modified R-29R missiles, was delivered from 1987 to 1990. On some ships the sonar station Avrora-1 was installed.

Most of the ships were decommissioned from 1995, when their next overhaul became due. Only the newest submarine, K-44 Ryazan, had a second general overhaul and refuelling during 2005–2007, which gave it a potential service life to 2017. It underwent another overhaul in 2012 and returned to service in 2017.

In 1994–2002 the submarine K-129 was rebuilt in Zvezdochka shipyard to be a special purpose submarine of Project 09786 (carrier of mini submarine) and renamed as BS-136 Orenburg.

On 30 September 2008, a Russian Navy spokesman reported that Ryazan had successfully completed a 30-day transit from a base in northern Russia under the Arctic ice cap to the Rybachiy submarine base, Kamchatka Peninsula. The Navy added that Ryazan would soon be assigned to regularly patrol the Pacific Ocean. In July 2008, six Delta III boats were active, of which two were believed to be in the process of decommissioning.

K-433 Svyatoy Georgiy Pobedonosets was involved in a collision with a fishing vessel on 22 September 2011. The submarine did not sustain serious damage.

As part of Russia's "Thunder 2019" military exercise, Ryazan attempted to launch two R-29R ballistic missiles on 17 October 2019. However, only one did so successfully while the other remained in its launch tube. In early 2025 satellite imagery showed that Ryazan was present at the Rybachiy Nuclear Submarine Base but it was not possible to ascertain its service status.

== As a space launch platform ==
The Delta III-class submarine was also used as a launch platform for the Volna space launch vehicle, which was derived from the R-29R ballistic missile. Four launches were completed between 2001 and 2005, from K-496 Borisoglebsk and K-44 Ryazan.

== Sections of pressure hull ==
1. Forward torpedo section
2. Battery and forward habitable section
3. Command and control section
4. Forward missile section
5. Rear missile section
6. Auxiliary mechanism and rear habitable section
7. Nuclear reactor section
8. Forward turbine section
9. Rear turbine section
10. Stern section

== Boats ==
Delta III class — significant dates
#	Shipyard	Name	Laid down	Launched	Commissioned	Fleet	Status
K-424	SEVMASH, Severodvinsk	NA	30 January 1974	11 February 1976	30 December 1976	Northern	Decommissioned 28 March 1995 for scrapping
K-441	SEVMASH, Severodvinsk	NA	7 May 1974	25 May 1976	31 October 1976	Pacific	Decommissioned 28 March 1995 for scrapping
K-449	SEVMASH, Severodvinsk	NA	19 July 1974	29 July 1976	5 February 1977	Pacific	In reserve from 1996, decommissioned in 2001, scrapped 2008
K-455	SEVMASH, Severodvinsk	NA	16 October 1974	16 August 1976	30 December 1976	Pacific	In reserve from 1998–99, probably decommissioned
K-490	SEVMASH, Severodvinsk	NA	6 March 1975	27 January 1977	30 September 1977	Pacific	In reserve from 1998–99, probably decommissioned
K-487	SEVMASH, Severodvinsk	NA	9 June 1975	4 April 1977	27 December 1977	Northern	In reserve from 1998–99, probably decommissioned
K-496	SEVMASH, Severodvinsk	Borisoglebsk	23 September 1975	13 August 1977	30 December 1977	Northern	Decommissioned on 9 December 2008, fuel discharged.
K-506	SEVMASH, Severodvinsk	Zelenograd	29 December 1975	26 January 1978	30 November 1978	Pacific	Removed from service in 2010, Decommissioned in June 2010
K-211	SEVMASH, Severodvinsk	Petropavlovsk-Kamchatskiy	19 August 1976	13 January 1979	28 September 1979	Pacific	Removed from active service in December 2010, in reserve 2012
K-223	SEVMASH, Severodvinsk	Podolsk	19 February 1977	30 April 1979	27 November 1979	Pacific	Removed from active service in 2018
K-180	SEVMASH, Severodvinsk	NA	27 December 1977	8 January 1980	25 September 1980	Pacific	In reserve from 2004, scrapped in 2008
K-433	SEVMASH, Severodvinsk	Svyatoy Georgiy Pobedonosets	24 August 1978	20 June 1980	15 December 1980	Pacific	Removed from active service in 2018
BS-136 (ex K-129)	SEVMASH, Severodvinsk	Orenburg	9 April 1979	15 April 1981	5 November 1981	Northern	1994–2002 – conversion to special purpose submarine Project 09786 (carrier of mini-submarine). Allegedly refitted in 2021
K-44	SEVMASH, Severodvinsk	Ryazan	31 January 1980	19 January 1982	17 September 1982	Pacific	Decommissioned

== See also ==
- List of submarine classes in service
