= Chizha test range =

Missile test range in northern Russia

- Kanin Peninsula, Nenets Autonomous Okrug in Russia

Site information
- Type: missile test range
- Operator: Russian Strategic Rocket Forces? Russian Navy?
- Status: in use

Chizha test range (Russian: полигон "Чижа") is a missile test range on the Kanin Peninsula in the Nenets Autonomous Okrug in northern Russia.

The village of Chizha is located on the River Chizha, which flows into the Barents Sea on the west side of the Kanin Peninsula. There is an aerodrome nearby and a monitoring station located at 67°4′11″N 44°18′21″E. Chizha test range is described as being on the tip of Cape Kanin, which is, 180 kilometres (110 mi) to the north.

On 19 October 2012 an R-29R Submarine-launched ballistic missile was launched from the Delta III class submarine K-433 Svyatoy Georgiy Pobedonosets towards the test range at Chizha. The submarine was in the Sea of Okhotsk, near the Pacific Ocean, over 6,000 kilometres (3,700 mi) away.

The same submarine had previously launched a missile towards Chizha on 28 October 2010, and on 9 October 2009.

== See also ==
- Kura Test Range
