= House of Razi-Bondarenko =

- Дом Рази-Бондаренко
- Location: Taganrog, Petrovskaya street, 84
- Coordinates: 47°12′55″N 38°55′47″E

The House of Razi-Bondarenko (Russian: Дом Рази-Бондаренко) is a building at Petrovsky, 84 in the city of Taganrog of the Rostov region. Nadezhda Razi and Semyon Mikhailovich Bondarenko were its most famous owners at different times.

== History ==
In the third quarter of the 19th century, a merchant named Razi acquired a site at the corner of Bolshoy Birzhevoy Lane in Taganrog. Adjacent to this site was a one-story building owned by his wife, Nadezhda Razi, which had been in her possession since 1873. Over time, two buildings were constructed in this location. One of them housed the Zvezdochka, which was supported by Dmitry Antonovich Kremenitsky, a petty bourgeoise. Nearby, the Gepferta hotel operated, and it also housed the city's finest cooperative confectionery bench. Later, the house became the location of a bookstore owned by S. S. Belokovsky, a teacher of initial schools, although this arrangement was short-lived and eventually transferred to A. A. Vashinenko. In the 1880s, a printing house was established at the site. The house remained under the ownership of Nadezhda Razi until 1906. It is known that in 1908, her successors and the successors of M. A. Popondopulo applied for the establishment of a brick extension and bench on the even side of Petrovsky Street.

In 1913 (according to other data – in 1915) Semyon Mikhailovich Bondarenko became the owner of the site and buildings. Prior to this, he owned houses at Aleksandrovskaya, 50 and Mikhaylovskoy, 41, as per the old street numbering system. Semyon Bondarenko's father was a merchant, and Semyon Mikhailovich started his business by purchasing and reselling large quantities of fish.

Semyon Bondarenko gained recognition in the city through the cinema he opened in Tchaikovsky Lane in January 1914. The cinema had a distinctive facade with an inscription created using electric bulbs, which read "Semyon Bondarenko movie theater". From April 1916 onwards, Bondarenko personally took charge of the theater's operations and ensured that the films were shown without interruptions. He achieved this by replacing the old equipment with new machinery manufactured by the Stalemate factory.

In March 1918 the movie theater was nationalized and renamed "Palace". In 1919 an art miniature "Mosaic" opened in it. By 1920 it was renamed "The second state a name of the Great Russian Revolution". In 1925 it adopted the name "Great Mute". During the 1930s, it became known as Rot Front and gained recognition as the city's first sound movie theater. In July 1957, it transitioned to screening large-format films.
