= Russian submarine Bryansk =

Soviet and Russian nuclear missile submarine

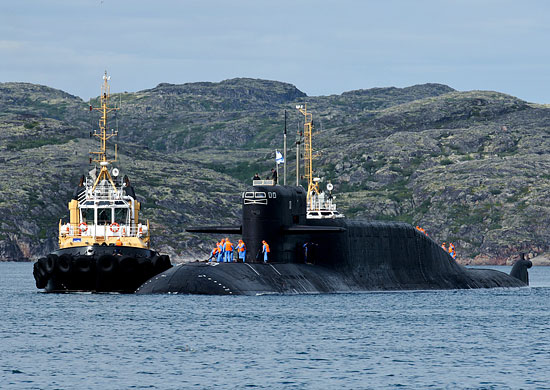
- Bryansk in 2013

History

Soviet Union, Russia
- Name: K-117 Bryansk
- Namesake: Bryansk
- Builder: Northern Machinebuilding Enterprise (Sevmash)
- Laid down: 20 April 1985
- Launched: 8 February 1988
- Commissioned: 30 September 1988
- Home port: Sayda Bay, Skalisty Naval Base
- Status: in active service

General characteristics
- Class & type: Delta-class submarine
- Displacement: 11,700 tons (surface); 18,200 tons (submerged)
- Length: 167 m (547 ft 11 in)
- Beam: 11.7 m (38 ft 5 in)
- Draft: 8.8 m (28 ft 10 in)
- Propulsion: Two VM4-SG nuclear reactors
- Speed: 14 knots (26 km/h; 16 mph) (surface); 24 knots (44 km/h; 28 mph) (submerged)
- Endurance: 80 days
- Complement: 135 officers and men
- Armament: 16 × RSM-54 missiles (R-29RMU); D-9RM missile system; 16 × missile launchers; 4 × 533mm torpedo tubes; 12 × torpedoes

K-117 Bryansk is a Russian Project 667BDRM Delfin-class (NATO reporting name: Delta IV) nuclear-powered ballistic missile submarine. The submarine was laid down in April 1985 in the Russian Northern Machinebuilding Enterprise, Sevmash. In September 1988 the submarine was commissioned in the Soviet navy. When launched the submarine became the 1000th Russian/Soviet submarine constructed. After the collapse of the Soviet Union the submarine continued to serve in the Russian navy. In July 2002 the submarine went into overhaul and didn't return until early 2008. As of 2010 the submarine is on active duty with the Russian Northern Fleet.

On 28 October 2010, the submarine conducted a successful SLBM launch.

The submarine remained active as of 2025.
