= Russian submarine Novomoskovsk =

1990 Delta IV-class submarine

Coordinates: 69°30′N 34°12′E

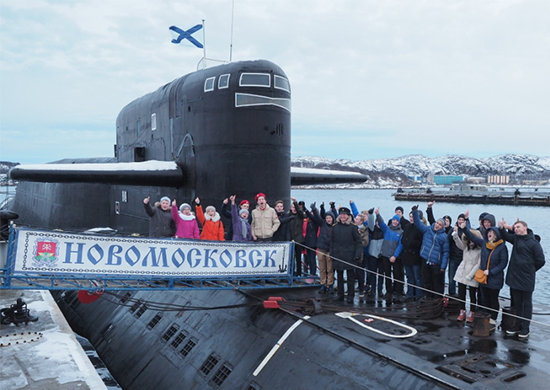
- Schoolchildren from the city of Gadzhiyevo visit K-407 Novomoskovsk.

History

→ Soviet Union → Russia
- Name: K-407 Novomoskovsk
- Namesake: Novomoskovsk, Russia
- Builder: Northern Engineering Plant (Sevmash)
- Laid down: 4 March 1988
- Launched: 28 February 1990
- Completed: 27 November 1990
- Commissioned: 20 February 1992
- Home port: Olenya Bay, Skalisty Naval Base
- Status: Ship in active service

General characteristics
- Class & type: Delta-class submarine
- Displacement: 11,700 tons (surface); 18,200 tons (submerged)
- Length: 167 m (547.9 ft)
- Beam: 11.7 m (38.4 ft)
- Draft: 8.8 m (28.9 ft)
- Propulsion: Two VM4-SG nuclear reactors
- Speed: 14 knots (26 km/h; 16 mph) (surface); 24 knots (44 km/h; 28 mph) (submerged)
- Endurance: 80 days
- Complement: 135 officers and men
- Armament: 16 × RSM-54 missiles; D-9RM missile system; 16 × missile launchers; 4 × 533mm torpedo tubes; 12 × torpedoes

K-407 Novomoskovsk is a Project 667BDRM Delfin-class ballistic missile submarine (NATO reporting name Delta IV) of the Russian Navy's Northern Fleet.

== Background ==
Construction of the nuclear submarine K-407 Novomoskovsk began at the Northern Machinebuilding Enterprise (Sevmash) in Severodvinsk on 2 February 1987, and it became part of the Soviet Navy on 27 November 1990. She was the last of seven 667BDRM Delfin submarines and the last SSBN submarine built in the USSR. This class of submarines was developed at the Rubin Design Bureau in 1975 and is considered one of the most successful Soviet submarine missile carrier designs.

== Specification ==
The submarine has a submerged displacement of 18,200 tons and a surface displacement of 11,700 tons. It is 167 m (547 ft 11 in) long and 11.7 m (38 ft 5 in) wide. It is powered by two nuclear reactors with a total power of 180 MW (240,000 hp). The submarine's immersion depth is 400 m (1,300 ft); its surface speed is 14 knots (26 km/h; 16 mph), and its underwater speed is 24 knots (44 km/h; 28 mph). It carries a crew of 135. Armaments include a D-9RM missile system (16 RSM-54 ballistic missiles) and four 533 mm (21.0 in) torpedo tubes.

The RSM-54 missile (3M37, R-29RM, or SS-N-23 according to the NATO classification) is a liquid-propellant, three-stage missile with separable heads (it carries four or ten warheads depending on the modification). It has a range of 8,300 km (5,200 mi), a CEP of 500 m (1,600 ft), and a launching mass of 40.3 tons. It is 14.8 m (48 ft 7 in) long and 1.9 m (6 ft 3 in) in diameter.

== History ==
On 6 August 1991 at 21:09 Novomoskovsk, under the command of Captain Second Rank Sergey Yegorov, became the world's only submarine to successfully launch an all-missile salvo, launching 16 ballistic missiles (RSM-54) of total weight of almost 700 tons at an interval of several seconds (operation code name "Behemoth-2"). The first and the last missiles hit their targets successfully, while the others were self-destroyed in the air according to the plan. This operation was considered by the Soviet Navy as a part of possible nuclear war scenario ("Dress rehearsal of the Apocalypse") and experimentally confirmed the technical possibility of a safe underwater all-missile salvo. Politically, the Soviet ballistic missile submarines passed a reasonability check as a part of strategic triad. The previous attempt of an all-missile salvo (operation code name "Behemoth") was performed in 1989 and finished unsuccessfully, however with no casualties. As the experiment took place just before the August Putsch in the USSR, its results were forgotten for a while, and the crew's work wasn't rewarded by the Soviet government authorities.

On 19 March 1993, Novomoskovsk, under the command of Captain First Rank Andrey Bulgakov, collided with USS Grayling. The American submarine was trailing the Russian submarine and miscalculated its speed. Both submarines returned to their homeports, and though badly damaged both returned to service. Grayling was decommissioned in 1997, while Novomoskovsk remains in service 30 years later.

In 1996, Novomoskovsk, together with the submarine K-447, successfully fired a batch of ballistic missiles. The city of Novomoskovsk in Tula Oblast took the submarine under its patronage, and on June 19, 1997, K-407 received the name Novomoskovsk.

On 7 July 1998, Novomoskovsk, under the command of Captain 1st Rank Aleksandr Moiseyev, launched a Shtil'-1 carrier rocket with two German scientific Tubsat-N and Tubsat-N1 microsatellites while submerged in the Barents Sea.

The unusual launch was the first time a commercial payload had ever been sent from Earth into orbit from a submarine and the first commercial space launch in the history of the Russian Navy.

The satellite, developed by Technische Universität Berlin, was placed in orbit on an SS-N-23 (RSM-54)-type ballistic missile. The Northern Fleet was paid some 200,000 German Mark (US$111,000) for the launch.

In 1999, Novomoskovsk pioneered the launch of a ballistic missile from the geographic location of the North Pole.

On 17 February 2004, Novomoskovsk seemingly attempted to test-fire a SS-N-23 ballistic missile, but the missile failed to come out of its silo because of an unspecified technical problem. The Russian Navy, despite earlier statements describing the test, explained that no "physical" launch was intended at all: the exercise was supposed to be a simulation. President of Russia Vladimir Putin was aboard Arkhangelsk, an Akula-class ballistic missile submarine (NATO reporting name Typhoon), to observe the exercise.

On 17 March 2004, Novomoskovsk physically test-fired two SS-N-23 ballistic missiles, successfully hitting designated practice targets on the Kamchatka Peninsula.

Like the other 667BDRM Delfin ships in service with the Northern Fleet, K-407 is slated to receive new SLBMs to replace the RSM-54. The missile is a new-build, minor modernization of the RSM-54. It does not bear a separate designator from the RSM-54/R-29RM/SS-N-23 asides from the name "Sineva". Testing of the R-29RM "Sineva" was completed in June 2004. Novomoskovsk is the third Delfin-class submarine in line to receive the new missile (after her siblings K-51 Verkhoturye and K-84 Ekaterinburg). She was fully overhauled and modernized in 2006 before returning to service.

In July 2006, cleric of Aleksandr Nevskiy Cathedral, the head of the Diocesan department on interaction with the Armed Forces and law enforcement agencies, priest Leonid Leontiuk was temporarily included in the personnel list of the K-18 Kareliya and was on board of K-407 Novomoskovsk. During the deployment the priest has performed the consecration ceremony of submarine's compartments, met with submarine personnel, led discussions on the basics of faith and spiritual life. Six sailors got baptized on board.

In November 2008 K-407 Novomoskovsk went to the Zvezdochka plant for general overhaul and modernization. On 29 July 2012 the refit was finished and the submarine returned to active service.

The submarine was expected to remain in service until 2020. However, she was still listed in commission as of 2022 and reported active as of 2025.

== 2010s ==
Novomoskovsk was described in Russian sources as being "worthy" of the proud name of "the most shooting" submarine of the Russian Navy. The submarine is part of the 31st Order of the Red Banner underwater strategic missile cruiser division of the 12th submarine squadron of the Northern Fleet (Olenya Bay, Skalisty Naval Base). The submarine's commander in 2012 was Captain Stepan Kelbas.

As a member of association of Russian regions and cities, patrons of Northern Fleet ships and units, the Tula Oblast patronages K-114 Tula and K-407 Novomoskovsk submarines and assists in "patriotic education" and preparation of young people for serving in the Armed Forces of the Russian Federation. Citizens of Novomoskovsk have preference to serve on K-407 Novomoskovsk. The submarine crew are regularly provided by humanitarian goods and visited by the city authorities.

== In popular culture ==
In 2007, Russian plastic model manufacturer Alanger introduced a 1:350 scale model of K-407 Novomoskovsk. In 2021, Rockstar Games added to GTA Online Kosatka, A Submarine owned by player, and run by Russian sailor called Pavel. The Submarine is highly based on 407 Novomoskovsk
