= K279 =

K279 or K-279 may refer to:

- K-279 (Kansas highway), a state highway in Kansas
- Soviet submarine K-279, a former Soviet Union submarine
