= Cosmos 1 =

Solar sail project

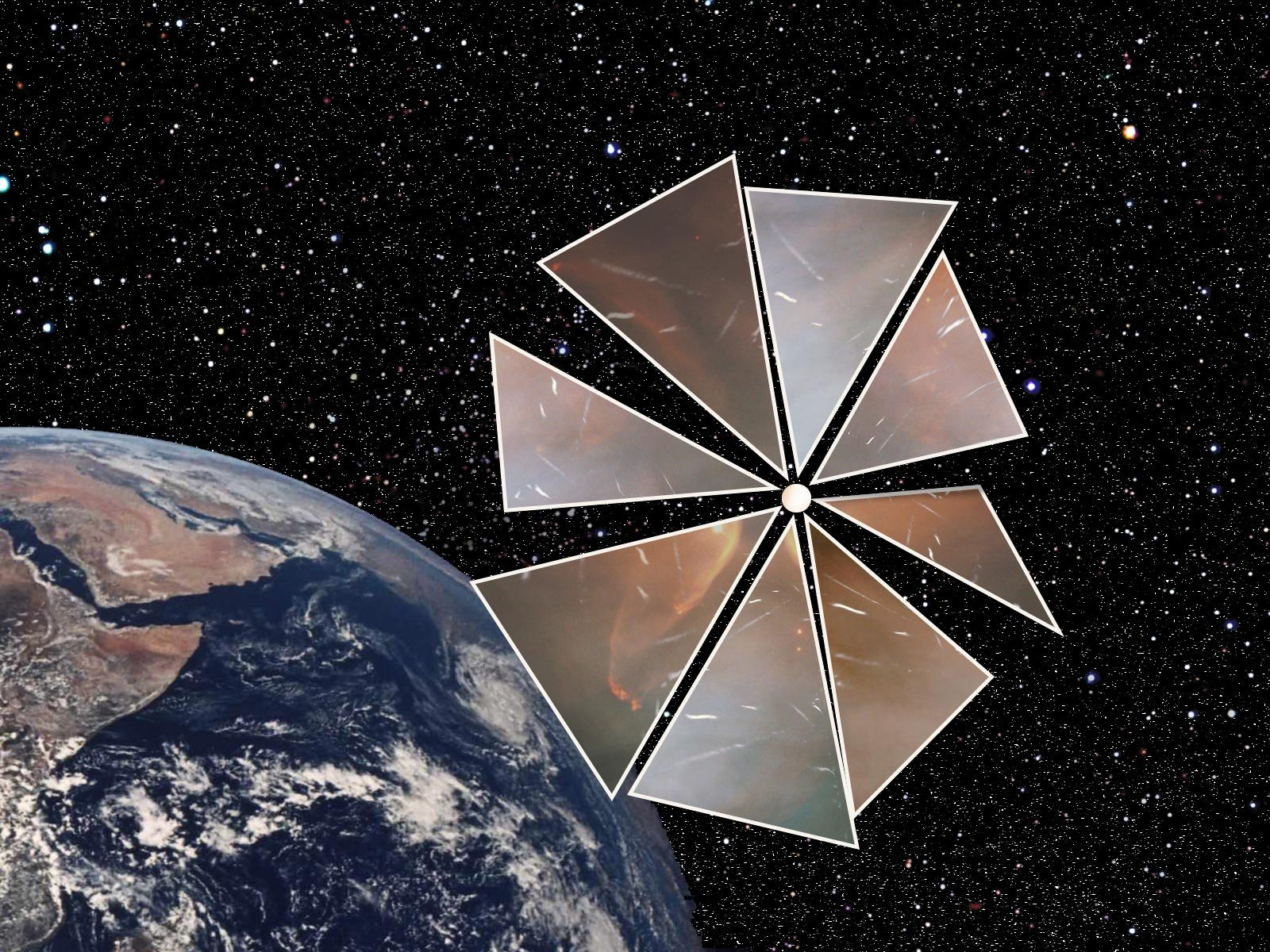
- An artist's rendering of Cosmos 1 orbiting the Earth
- Mission type: Technology demonstration
- Operator: The Planetary Society
- Mission duration: Failed to orbit 30 days (planned)

Spacecraft properties
- Manufacturer: The Planetary Society
- Launch mass: 100 kg (220 lb)
- Dimensions: 30 m (98 ft) in diameter

Start of mission
- Launch date: 21 June 2005, 19:46:09 UTC
- Rocket: Volna
- Launch site: K-496 Borisoglebsk, Barents Sea
- Contractor: Makeyev Rocket Design Bureau

End of mission
- Destroyed: Failed to orbit

Orbital parameters
- Reference system: Geocentric orbit (planned)
- Regime: Low Earth orbit
- Altitude: 800 km (500 mi)
- Inclination: 80.00°

Cosmos 1 was a project by Cosmos Studios and The Planetary Society to test a solar sail in space. As part of the project, an uncrewed solar-sail spacecraft named Cosmos 1 was launched into space at 19:46:09 UTC (15:46:09 EDT) on 21 June 2005 from the submarine Borisoglebsk in the Barents Sea. However, a rocket failure prevented the spacecraft from reaching its intended orbit. Once in orbit, the spacecraft was supposed to deploy a large sail, upon which photons from the Sun would push, thereby increasing the spacecraft's velocity (the contributions from the solar wind are similar, but of much smaller magnitude).

Had the mission been successful, it would have been the first ever orbital use of a solar sail to speed up a spacecraft, as well as the first space mission by a space advocacy group. The project budget was US$4 million. The Planetary Society planned to raise another US$4 million for Cosmos 2, a reimplementation of the experiment provisionally to be launched on a Soyuz resupply mission to the International Space Station (ISS). The Discovery Channel was an early investor. However, advances in technology and the greater availability of lower-mass piggyback slots on more launch vehicles led to a redesign similar to NanoSail-D, called LightSail-1, announced in November 2009.

== Planned mission profile ==
To test the solar sail concept, the Cosmos 1 project launched an orbital spacecraft they named Cosmos 1 with a full complement of eight sail blades on 21 June 2005; the summer solstice. The spacecraft had a mass of 100 kg (220 lb) and consisted of eight triangular sail blades, which would be deployed from a central hub after launch by the inflating of structural tubes. The sail blades were each 15 m (49 ft) long, had a total surface area of 600 m^{2} (6,500 sq ft), and were made of aluminized-reinforced PET film (MPET).

The spacecraft was launched on a Volna launch vehicle (a converted SS-N-18 intercontinental ballistic missile (ICBM)) from the Russian Delta III submarine Borisoglebsk, submerged in the Barents Sea. The spacecraft's initial circular orbit would have been at an altitude of about 800 km (500 mi), where it would have unfurled the sails. The sails would then have gradually raised the spacecraft to a higher Earth orbit. "Cosmos 1 might boost its orbit 50 to 100 km (31 to 62 mi) over the expected 30-day life of the mission", said Louis Friedman of The Planetary Society.

The mission was expected to end within a month of launch, as the mylar of the blades would degrade in sunlight.

=== Possible beam propulsion ===
The solar-sail craft could also have been used to measure the effect of artificial microwaves aimed at it from a radar installation. A 70 m (230 ft) dish at the Goldstone facility of NASA Deep Space Network would have been used to irradiate the sail with a 450 kW beam. This experiment in beam-powered propulsion would only have been attempted after the prime mission objective of controlled solar-sail flight was achieved.

=== Tracking ===
The craft would have been visible to the naked eye from most of the Earth's surface: the planned orbit had an inclination of 80°, so it would have been visible from latitudes of up to approximately 80° north and south.

A network of tracking stations around the world, including the Tarusa station, 121 km (75 mi) south of Moscow, and the Space Sciences Laboratory at the University of California, Berkeley, tried to maintain contact with the solar sail during the mission. Mission control was based primarily at the Russian company NPO Lavochkin in Moscow; a center that the Planetary Society calls Mission Operations Moscow (MOM).

== Physics ==
The craft would have been gradually accelerating during each orbit as a result of the radiation pressure of photons colliding with the sails. As photons reflected from the surface of the sails, they would transfer momentum to them. As there would be no air resistance to oppose the velocity of the spacecraft, acceleration would be proportional to the number of photons colliding with it per unit time. Sunlight amounts to a tiny 5×10^{−4} m/s^{2} acceleration in the vicinity of the Earth. Over one day, the spacecraft's speed would reach 45 m/s (150 ft/s); in 100 days its speed would be 4,500 m/s (15,000 ft/s), in 2.74 years 45,000 m/s (150,000 ft/s).

At that speed, a craft would reach Pluto, a very distant dwarf planet in the Solar System, in less than 5 years, although in practice the acceleration of a sail drops dramatically as the spacecraft gets farther from the Sun. However, in the vicinity of Earth, a solar sail's acceleration is larger than that of some other propulsion techniques; for example, the ion thruster-propelled SMART-1 spacecraft has a maximum acceleration of 2×10^{−4} m/s^{2}, which allowed SMART-1 to achieve lunar orbit in November 2004 after launch in September 2003.

== Other aspects ==
Besides the main spacecraft, launched in June 2005, the Cosmos 1 project has funded two other craft:

- A suborbital test was attempted in 2001 with only two sail blades. The spacecraft failed to separate from the rocket.
- A second orbital spacecraft (LightSail-1) was launched in May 2015.

One of Cosmos 1 solar-sail blades was displayed at the Rockefeller Center office complex in New York City in 2003.
