= Shtil' =

Rocket used for launching satellites

- Shtil'
- Function: Small-lift launch vehicle
- Country of origin: Russia

Size
- Height: 14.8 m (49 ft)
- Diameter: 1.9 m (6.2 ft)
- Mass: 39,300 kg (86,600 lb)

Capacity

Payload to LEO
- Altitude: 200 km (120 mi)
- Mass: 280 kg (620 lb)

Launch history
- Status: Retired
- Launch sites: K-407 Novomoskovsk, K-84 Ekaterinburg
- Total launches: 2
- Success(es): 2
- Failure: 0
- Partial failure: 0
- First flight: 7 July 1998
- Last flight: 26 May 2006

Space launch vehicle Shtil' (Russian: Штиль - calm (weather)), is a converted SLBM used for launching artificial satellites into orbit, with a payload of around 280 kg (620 lb). It is the first launch vehicle to successfully launch a payload into orbit from a submarine, although launch from land based structures is possible as well.

== Description ==
The launcher is based on the R-29RM SLBM (designed by State Rocket Center Makeyev), similar to the Volna Launch Vehicle. It is a 3-stage launch vehicle that uses liquid propellant. The payload is placed in a special capsule in the space head next to the third stage engine nozzle. The missiles used are withdrawn from active service with the Russian Navy and converted to civilian launch vehicles by removing the warheads and antennas. To inject the payload into the right orbit the flight software is adjusted and additional measuring equipment is installed. Because of its mobile launch platform the Shtil' launch vehicle can reach a large number of different inclinations and both Sun-synchronous orbit and low Earth orbit. The possible payload is determined by the desired mission. On a typical mission to a 200 km circular orbit at an inclination of 79 degrees the Shtil' has a payload of 280 kg. Proposed version have a higher payload capacity of up to 430 kg for the Shtil-3.

== Proposed versions ==
=== Shtil'-2.1 ===
A proposed version under development of the Shtil' launch vehicle features the payload in a special section on top of the space head. This increases the possible volume and weight of the payload inserted into orbit.

=== Shtil'-2R ===
A further developed version of the launch vehicle features a larger payload section on top of the space head. The additional space is used for larger and heavier payloads and an additional boost engine to propel the payload in higher orbits. The increase in length of the launch vehicle means that it can only be launched from a ground based launching complex.

=== Shtil'-3 ===
The final proposed version of the Shtil' launch vehicle features a redesigned third stage with enlarged propellant tanks. The space head used on previous version is omitted and replaced by a newly designed section for instruments and the payload adapter. The payload section can, when necessary for the mission, include an additional booster engine.

== Launch history ==
- On 7 July 1998, the Shtil' launch vehicle placed two payloads in Low Earth Orbit. The German Tubsat-N and Tubsat-N1 were launched from the Delta-class submarine K-407 Novomoskovsk of the Russian Northern Fleet 3rd Flotilla. The launch was made from a firing range in the Barents Sea. The payloads weighing 8 kg and 3 kg respectively were placed in a 400 x 776 km orbit at an inclination of 78.9 degrees. This was the first time satellites were launched from a submarine.
- On 26 May 2006, the Shtil' launch vehicle inserted the Kompas 2 satellite into Low Earth Orbit. The launch was performed from the Barents Sea by the Delta-class submarine K-84 Ekaterinburg. The Kompass 2 satellite has a weight of 77 kg and was put in a 500 km high orbit at an inclination of 79.8 degrees.

=== Cancelled launch ===
- The South African satellite SumbandilaSat, an 80-kg microsatellite with a multispectral imager as primary payload, was scheduled for launch from the Sthil' launch vehicle in early 2007. SumbandilaSat was eventually launched into a 500 km low Earth orbit on 17 September 2009 on a Soyuz-2.1b rocket.

== See also ==
- Sea Launch
- Submarine-launched ballistic missile
- Comparison of orbital launchers families
- Comparison of orbital launch systems
- Volna
