= Russian submarine BS-64 =

History

Russia
- Name: BS-64
- Builder: Northern Engineering Plant (Sevmash), Severodvinsk
- Laid down: 18 December 1982
- Launched: 2 February 1986
- Commissioned: 23 December 1986
- Renamed: Had been K-64 until 2002
- Status: In active service

General characteristics (As Delta IV class)
- Class & type: Delta-class submarine
- Displacement: 11,700 tons (surface); 18,200 tons (submerged)
- Length: 174 m (570.9 ft)
- Beam: 11.7 m (38.4 ft)
- Draught: 8.8 m (28.9 ft)
- Propulsion: Two VM4-SG nuclear reactors
- Speed: 14 knots (26 km/h; 16 mph) (surface); 24 knots (44 km/h; 28 mph) (submerged)
- Endurance: 80 days
- Complement: 135 officers and ratings
- Armament: 16 × RSM-54 missiles; D-9RM missile system; 16 × missile launchers; 4 × 533mm torpedo tubes; 12 × torpedoes

BS-64 is a Project 667BDRM Delfin-class ballistic missile submarine (NATO reporting name Delta IV) of the Russian Navy. She was originally designated K-64.

K-64 was removed from active service in 1999 and was ordered to be refitted. It was planned for her to be reactivated in 2002 to replace the Yankee 'Stretch'-class KS-411. KS-411 had been the mothership for the Paltus-class mini submarines, which are believed to be used for a combination of oceanographic research, search and rescue, and underwater intelligence-gathering. Due to lack of funds this plan was postponed. K-64 was renamed BS-64 in 2002, and her central section containing 16 silos for ballistic missiles was removed to create space for the installation of scientific-experimental equipment, cabins for scientists and a rest room for the regular crew. There were unofficial reports that in 2008 the ship had been named Vladimir, before the official name Podmoskovye was announced later that year.

After her conversion was completed at Zvezdochka shipyard the submarine was relaunched on 11 August 2015. Following the completion of repairs it is believed that the submarine was converted to serve as carrier of mini submarine(s), such as the deep-diving nuclear powered mini-submarine Losharik. Sea trials started in the White Sea in October 2016 and the submarine was handed over to the Russian Navy in December the same year as a Pr. 09787 carrier of mini-submarines and possibly as a nuclear deep-water station.

The submarine was reported active as of 2021.

In 2026 she may have undertaken operations near British and European critical underwater infrastructure.
