= Russian submarine Borisoglebsk =

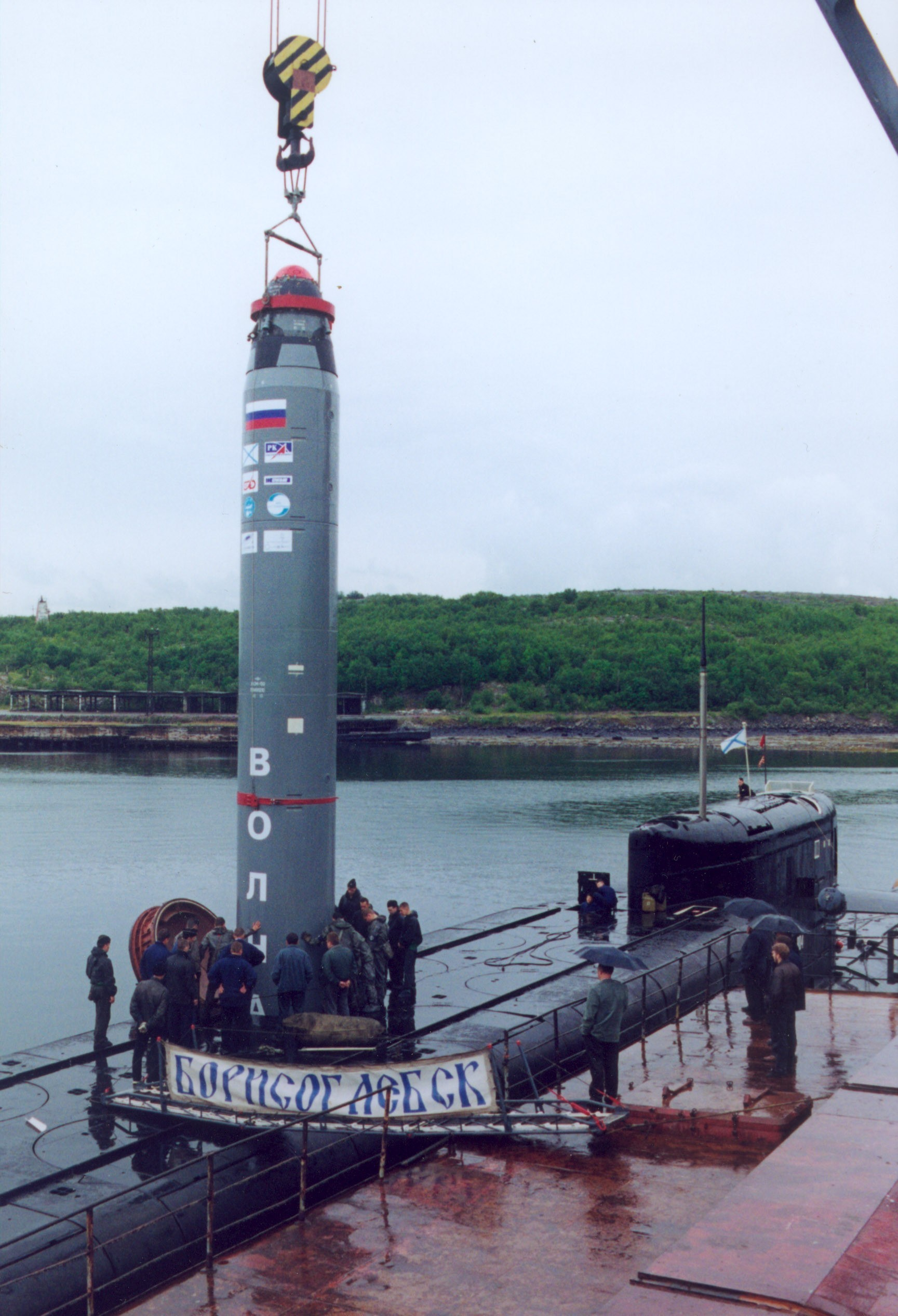
- SLV Volna at K-496, 2001

History

Soviet Union, Russia
- Name: Borisoglebsk
- Namesake: Borisoglebsk
- Laid down: 23 September 1975
- Launched: 13 August 1977
- Completed: 30 December 1977
- Decommissioned: December 2008
- Fate: To be dismantled

General characteristics
- Class & type: Delta III-class submarine
- Displacement: Surfaced: 10,600 tons; Submerged: 13,700 tons
- Length: 155 m (509 ft)
- Beam: 11.7 m (38 ft)
- Draught: 8.7 m (29 ft)
- Depth: Operational: 320 m (1,050 ft); Maximum: 400 m (1,300 ft)
- Propulsion: Reactor system OK-700A (two VM-4S (2*90 MW) PWR) powering 2 steam turbines delivering 44,700 kW (59,900 shp) to 2 five-bladed fixed pitched shrouded propellers
- Speed: Surfaced: 14 knots (26 km/h; 16 mph); Submerged: 24 knots (44 km/h; 28 mph)
- Range: Unlimited, except by food supplies
- Complement: 40 officers, 90 enlisted
- Armament: 16 × RSM-50 R-29R "Vysota" missiles; 4 × bow 533 mm (21 in) torpedo tubes; 16 torpedoes (SET-65, SAET-60M, 53-65K, 53-65M)

K-496 Borisoglebsk is a Russian advanced Delta III SSBN nuclear submarine. On 21 June 2005 the vessel served as the launch platform for a Volna space launch vehicle carrying a payload containing a solar sail experiment, Cosmos 1. The submarine was based in the Russian Northern Fleet. In early December 2008 Borisoglebsk was decommissioned from the fleet and was getting ready to be scrapped.

== Sources ==
- Russian Media Monitoring Agency – Kursk submarine (2000–2003) / WPS Russian Media Monitoring Agency
