= Operation Behemoth =

Soviet military exercises in 1989-1991

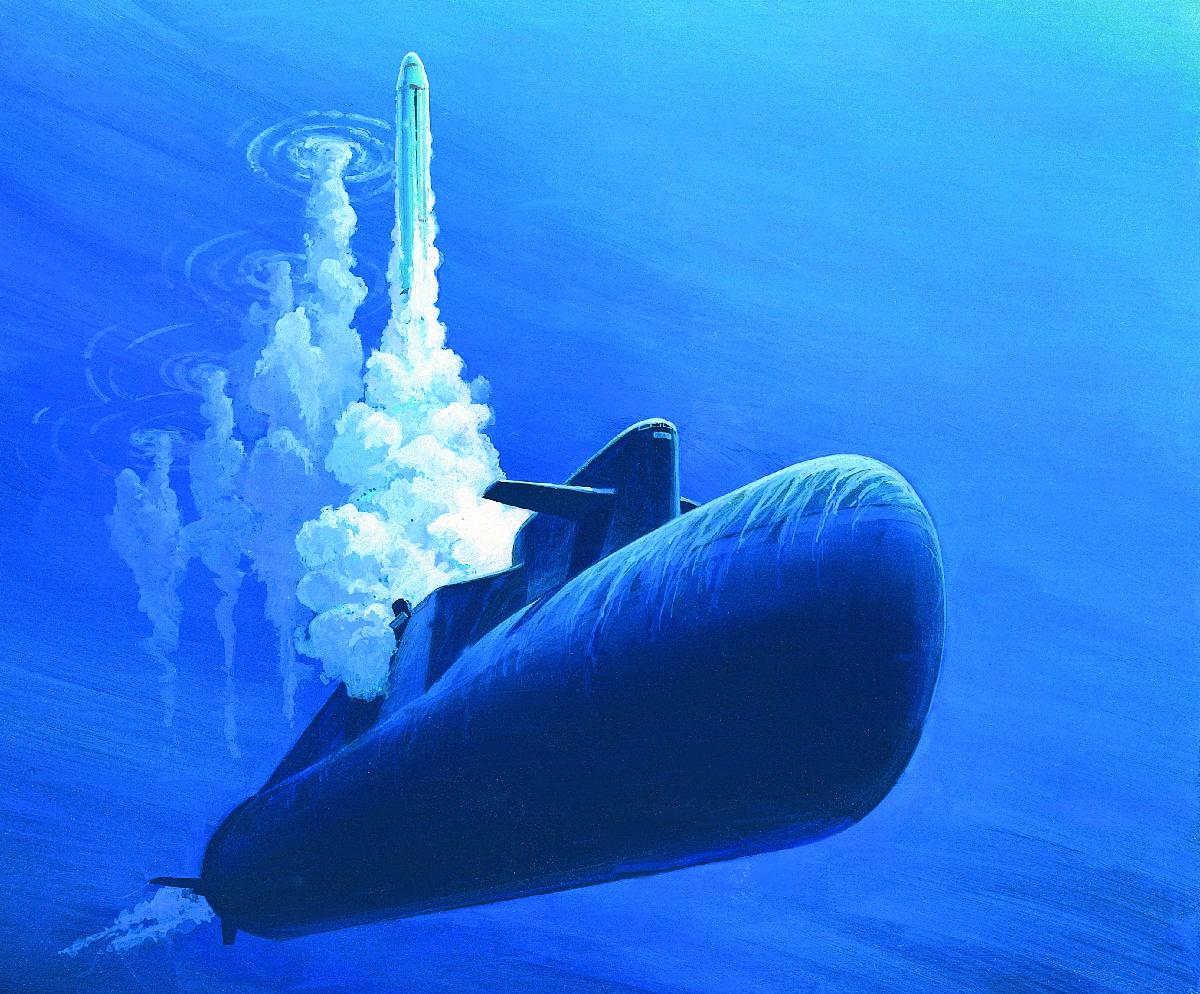
Artist's conception of the operation Behemoth-2

Operation Behemoth-1, Behemoth-2 (Russian: Бегемот - Begemot, Hippopotamus) were military exercises held by the Soviet Northern Fleet in 1989 and 1991. Behemoth-2 was the first time a ballistic missile submarine launched all of its missiles at once. The exercise took place barely four months before the collapse of the Soviet Union.

== Behemoth-1 ==
On August 6, 1989, the Delta IV-class submarine, K-84 Ekaterinburg, attempted to salvo launch all 16 R-29RM missiles. The operation failed due to a leak of fuel and oxidizer from missile number six just prior to the start. This leak caused a fire and a pressure boost inside the silo which destroyed the missile.

== Behemoth-2 ==
The second attempt took place two years later and succeeded. On August 6, 1991, the Delta IV-class submarine K-407 Novomoskovsk, under the command of Captain Second Rank Sergey Yegorov, performed a full salvo underwater launch, launching all 16 R-29RM missiles on board. The whole salvo took 224 seconds (3 minutes, 44 seconds) with a 14 second interval between launches. During this the submarine expelled more than 650 tons of weight. The first and sixteenth missile, launched from the Barents Sea at a depth of 50 metres (160 ft), hit their designated targets at Kura Missile Test Range in Kamchatka.

"On August 6, 1991 at 21 hours 07 minutes a volley fire the complete fire unit of RSM-54 rockets from the submarine of the project 667BDRM was carried out the. In the interests of the reduction of expenditures the operation was conducted on the planned combat training of the crew of submarine and the regular flight only of two rockets. The rockets, which start in the volley of the first and last, had to run complete flight program and fall onto the assigned aiming points. The remaining rockets, which participate in the volley, had to from all parameters of launch completely correspond to combat missiles, but the height of their flight could be arbitrary. For conducting the volley by complete fire unit was isolated the submarine “Novomoskovsk” (commander of boat S.V. Yegorov) and 16 rockets RSM-54, prepared by the Krasnoyarsk Machine Building Plant. The launching passed successfully, and until then no one in the world had conducted a shoot of a complete fire unit."

K-407 Novomoskovsk broke the record of the Yankee II-class submarine, K-140, which launched eight missiles on December 20, 1968.

Behemoth-2 was viewed as a possible scenario of a nuclear war against the United States and was executed to confirm the possibility and safety of a quick underwater salvo.
