= Soviet submarine K-279 =

History
- Name: K-279
- Ordered: 1965
- Builder: Sevmash, Severodvinsk
- Laid down: 1971
- Launched: January 1972
- Commissioned: 22 December 1972
- Decommissioned: 1992
- Fate: Dismantled, 1998

General characteristics
- Class & type: Delta-class submarine
- Displacement: 9000 m³ (8,900 t (8,759 long tons)) surfaced; 10500m³ (13,700 long tons (13,920 t)) submerged
- Length: 139 m (456 ft 0 in)
- Beam: 12 m (39 ft 4 in)
- Draft: 9 m (29 ft 6 in)
- Propulsion: 2 × VM-4B PWRs generating 90 MW each; 2 × steam turbines producing 52,000 hp (39 MW) each
- Speed: 12 knots (22 km/h; 14 mph) surfaced; 25 knots (46 km/h; 29 mph) submerged
- Endurance: 80 days
- Test depth: 390 m (1,280 ft) designed; 450 m (1,480 ft) maximum
- Complement: 120 officers and men
- Armament: D-9 launch system with 12 R-29 Vysota SLBM; 4 × 21 in (533 mm) torpedo tubes

Service record
- Part of: Soviet Northern Fleet, 1972–1991; Russian Northern Fleet, 1991–1992

K-279 was the first Project 667B Murena (also known by the NATO reporting name Delta I) ballistic missile submarine of the Soviet Navy. Development of Project 667B began in 1965. Her keel was laid down in 1971 by Sevmash at the Severodvinsk shipyard. She was launched in January 1972, and commissioned in the Soviet Northern Fleet on 22 December 1972.

== Service history ==
In 1983, while operating under the Arctic Ocean icecap at the depth of 190 metres (620 ft), K-279 struck an iceberg. The submarine rolled about 20 degrees and lost depth control, diving to 300 metres (980 ft) before recovering. The submarine continued her mission for another two months before returning to port, despite the significant damage she had suffered. The Soviet Navy published an advisory to submarine captains warning that the bottoms of icebergs can extend to depths of 200 metres (660 ft) or more.

The American writers claims that on 20 October 1986, USS Augusta collided with K-279 in the eastern Atlantic. The Soviet Navy claimed that Augusta collided with K-457.

In 1992, K-279 was decommissioned and held in reserve. In 1998 she was dismantled at Zvezdochka shipyard in Severodvinsk and her reactor section was towed to Sayda Bay.

== See also ==
- K-219, another Soviet submarine which allegedly hit USS Augusta (SSN-710).
