= Volna =

Space launch vehicle

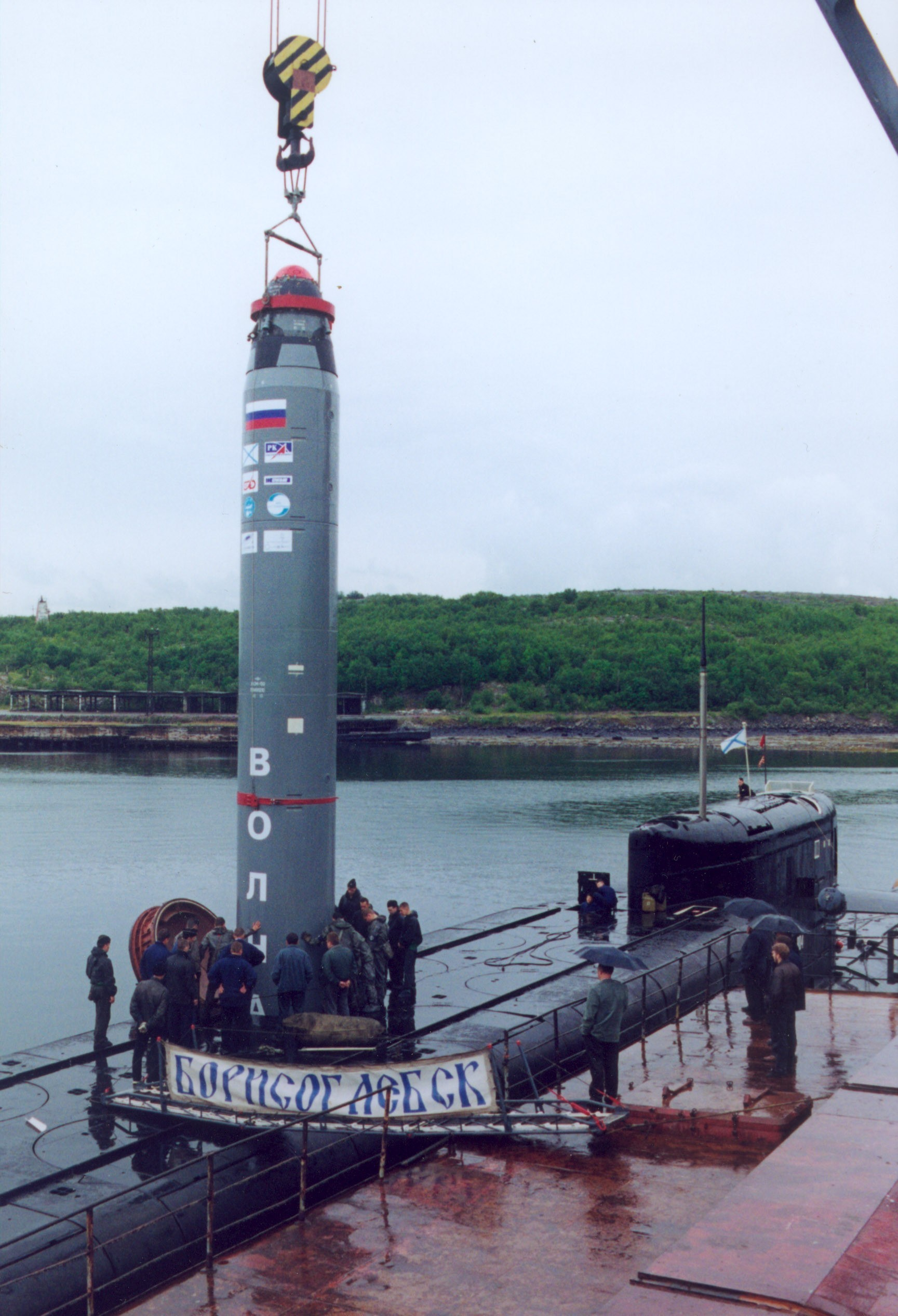
- A Volna rocket with the Cosmos 1 is loaded into the launch tube of K-496 Borisoglebsk submarine, photo by The Planetary Society
- Function: Small-lift launch vehicle
- Country of origin: Russia

Capacity

Payload to LEO
- Mass: 115 kg (254 lb)

Launch history
- Status: Retired
- Launch sites: K-496 Borisoglebsk , K-84 Ekaterinburg, K-44 Ryazan, K-407 Novomoskovsk,
- Total launches: 5
- Success(es): 2
- Failure(s): 1
- Partial failure(s): 2
- First flight: June 07, 1995
- Last flight: June 21, 2005

First stage
- Engines: RD-0243

Space launch vehicle Volna (Russian: Волна, lit. 'wave'), is a converted submarine-launched ballistic missile used for launching satellites into orbit. It is based on the R-29R designed by State Rocket Center Makayev and related to the Shtil' Launch Vehicle. The Volna is a 3-stage launch vehicle that uses liquid propellant. The warhead section is used for the payloads that can be either put into orbit with the help of an additional boost engine or travel along a sub-orbital trajectory to be recovered at the landing site. Volna can be launched from Delta III-class submarine or from land based facilities.

== Performance ==
Because of its mobile launch platform the Volna launch vehicle can reach a large number of different inclinations and could increase its performance to low Earth orbit by launching from equatorial sites. All flights to date have taken place from the Barents Sea. From this site the Volna can lift 100 kg (220 lb) into a 400 km (250 mi) high orbit with an inclination of 79°. The warhead section can accommodate a payload of up to 1.3 m^{3} (46 cu ft). For sub-orbital missions the payload can be either a recoverable vehicle of up to 720 kg (1,590 lb) or research equipment placed in a descent vehicle of up to 400 kg (880 lb).

== Launch history ==
External images
- Artist's concept of Volna launch, by Michael Carroll
- A stock photo of the Volna launch, unknown date and mission

- The first launch of the Volna took place on June 7, 1995 on a suborbital trajectory. The rocket was launched from a submarine in the Barents Sea, reached an apogee of 1250 km and the payload was recovered in Kamchatka, 5600 km from where it was launched. The payload of this flight was a thermal convection experiment, developed by Center of Applied Space Technology and Microgravity of Bremen University (Germany).
- On 20 July 2001 the second flight took place with a simplified (two-bladed) test vehicle of the Cosmos 1 solar sail of the Planetary Society and an inflatable re-entry heat shield. The Volna was launched from Delta III Submarine Borisoglebsk in the Barents Sea. Although the launch vehicle reached the intended suborbital trajectory the spacecraft failed to separate. The separation command was not issued by the flight software because of the presence of non-nominal variations. Failure of the Cosmos-1 to separate also resulted in the loss of the secondary payload, a new inflatable re-entry vehicle.
- On 12 July 2002 the Volna was used for a sub-orbital flight for a second attempt to test a new re-entry vehicle, IRDT-2. The launch took place from Delta III class submarine K-44 Ryazan. Due to a failure in the launcher/payload interface the vehicle was lost and did not land on the expected area on the Kamchatka peninsula. It is unclear whether the spacecraft separated from the third stage of the Volna and did not inflate correctly or that it remained attached to the payload module. Remains of the vehicle have not been found.
- The fourth flight took place at 21 June 2005 with on board the Cosmos 1 Solar sail. The launch took place from Delta III Submarine Borisoglebsk in the Barents Sea. The spacecraft failed to reach orbit after stage one shut down prematurely at 82.86 seconds instead of the expected 100 seconds. The failure was attributed to "critical degradation in operational capability of the engine turbo-pump". The second and third stage did not separate and the payload did not reach orbit.
- On 6 October 2005 the Volna carried IRDT-2R on a sub-orbital trajectory, launched from Delta III Class Submarine Borisoglebsk in the Barents Sea. The launch vehicle performed nominally and placed the payload on a trajectory towards the Kamchatka peninsula. Trajectory data shows that the vehicle most likely overshot the landing site and could not be recovered.

== See also ==
- Comparison of orbital launchers families
