= Tubsat-N =

Tubsat-N was a German miniaturized satellite for communication designed by Technische Universität Berlin. The satellite was launched on July 7, 1998 by the Russian submarine K-407 Novomoskovsk in Barents Sea using a Shtil' rocket.

Tubsat-N had a mass of 8.0 kg (17.60 lb) and measured 32 × 32 × 10.4 cm. The orbit of this satellite had a perigee of 400 km (240 mi) and an apogee of 776 km (482 mi).
