= Russian submarine Karelia =

1988 Delta-class submarine

K-18 Karelia
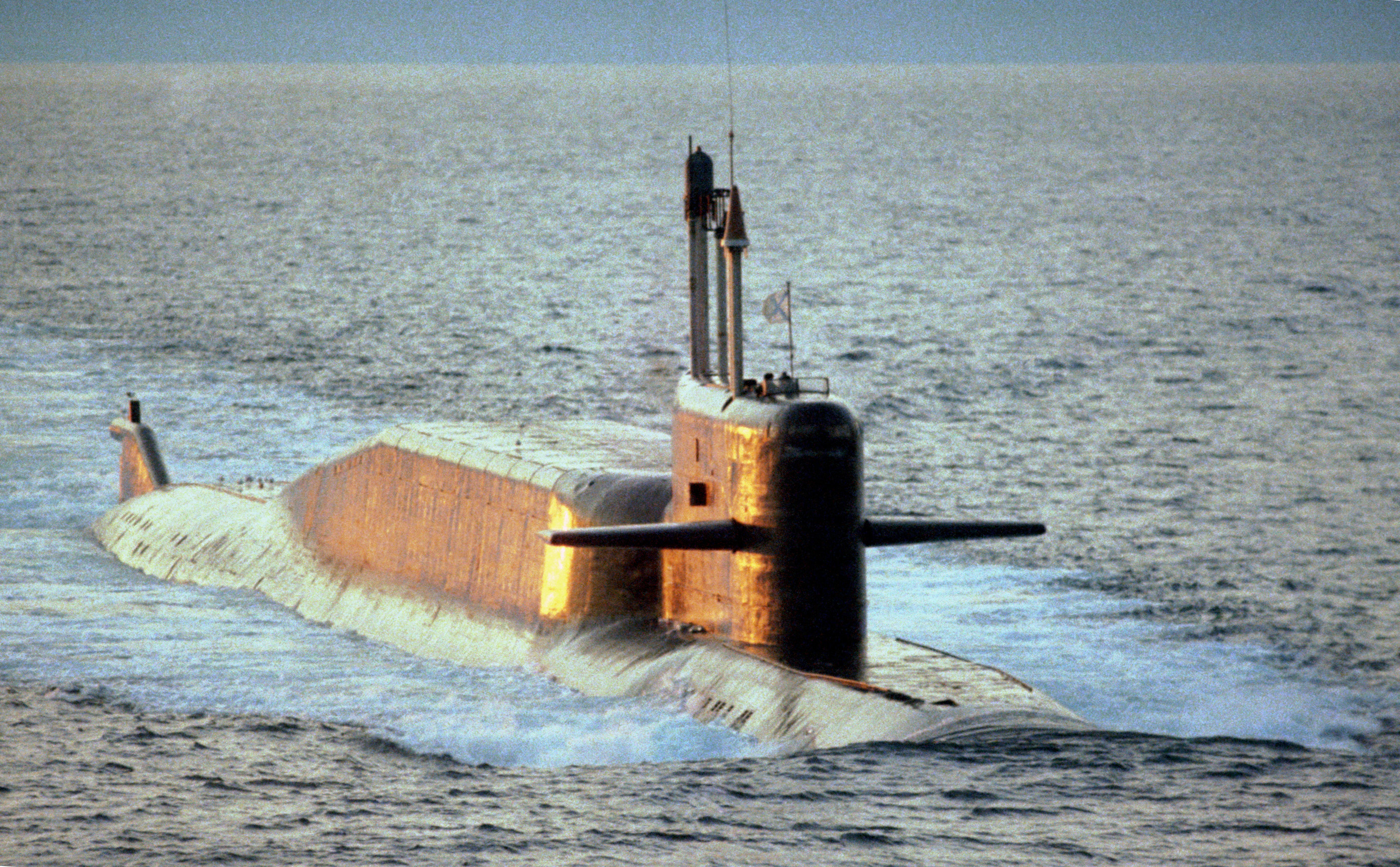
- K-18 Karelia

History

Soviet Union, Russia
- Name: K-18 Karelia
- Namesake: Republic of Karelia
- Awarded: Russian Federation
- Builder: Sevmash, Severodvinsk
- Laid down: February 1987
- Launched: 1988
- Commissioned: 1989
- Home port: Gadzhievo, Northern Fleet
- Status: Active

General characteristics
- Class & type: Delta IV-class ballistic missile submarine
- Displacement: 18,200 tonnes (17,900 long tons; 20,100 short tons)
- Length: 167 m (548 ft)
- Beam: 11.7 m (38 ft)
- Draft: 8.8 m (29 ft)
- Installed power: 2 × VM-4 pressurized water reactors; 180 MW (240,000 hp)
- Propulsion: 2 × type GT3A-365 turbines, two shafts with seven-bladed fixed-pitch propellers
- Speed: Surfaced: 14 knots (26 km/h; 16 mph); Submerged: 24 knots (44 km/h; 28 mph)
- Range: Unlimited except by food supplies
- Endurance: 80 days
- Test depth: 550–650 m (1,800–2,130 ft)
- Complement: 135-140
- Sensors & processing systems: Snoop Tray surface search radar
- Armament: 16 × R-29RM Shtil or R-29RMU Sineva nuclear ballistic missiles; RPK-7 Veter anti-ship missiles; 4 × 533-mm bow tubes for up to 12 torpedoes

K-18 Karelia (Russian: К-18 Карелия) is a Project 667BDRM Delfin-class (NATO reporting name: Delta IV) nuclear-powered ballistic missile submarine currently in service with the Russian Navy. It was built in Severodvinsk by Sevmash shipbuilding company and was commissioned in 1989. It was refitted from 2004 to 2009, after which it returned to the navy.

== Description ==
K-18 Karelia has a length of 167.4 m (549 ft) overall, a beam of 11.7 m (38 ft) and a draft of 8.8 m (29 ft). She displaces 18,200 tonnes (17,900 long tons; 20,100 short tons) and has a test diving depth of 550–650 m (1,800–2,130 ft). The complement is about 135-140.

The boat is powered by two VM-4 180 MW (240,000 hp) pressurized water reactors which drive two shafts with seven-bladed fixed-pitch propellers. She can achieve a maximum speed of 14 knots (26 km/h; 16 mph) when surfaced and 24 knots (44 km/h; 28 mph) when submerged.

The boat is equipped with 16 R-29RM Shtil (range of 8,300 km (5,200 mi) or R-29RMU Sineva (range of 11,547 km (7,175 mi) submarine-launched ballistic missiles, RPK-7 Veter anti-ship missiles and 4 533-mm bow tubes to launch up to 12 torpedoes or 24 mines.

== Construction and service ==
Karelia was laid down in the Sevmash shipbuilding yard in February 1987 and was launched in 1988. It bears the name of a region of northwestern Russia (and eastern Finland). It was commissioned into the Soviet Navy in 1989, and after the dissolution of the Soviet Union, it was transferred to the Russian Navy.

Karelia underwent modernisation at Zvezdochka shipyard in northern Russia between 2004 and 2009. The submarine had 100 new components added which included the TVR-671RM rocket torpedo system and the RSM-54 Sineva SLBMs. Other upgrades included noise reduction, better vessel-tracking capabilities and improved survivability. The submarine has fired over 14 missiles and has traveled more than 140,000 nautical miles (260,000 km; 160,000 mi).

In April 2000, Vladimir Putin, then the Acting President of Russia, spent the night in the submarine at a depth of over 50 metres, and oversaw the Northern Fleet exercises. Officers demonstrated to Putin how ballistic missiles were launched, and Putin was made an honorary submariner after he followed the traditional submariner's ritual of drinking seawater. In February 2022, the submarine participated in the Grom-2022 strategic nuclear exercises, which were held in the context of the prelude to the Russian invasion of Ukraine. The submarine successfully launched a Sineva ballistic missile from a position in the Barents Sea.

The submarine was reported in modernization refit as of 2025. It was completed in 2026.
