= Zvyozdochka, Irkutsk Oblast =

Zvyozdochka Звёздочка
- Village
- Location within Irkutsk Oblast Location within Russia
- Coordinates: 52°20′N 103°38′E
- Country: Russia
- Region: Irkutsk Oblast
- District: Angarsky District
- Time zone: UTC+8:00

Zvyozdochka (Russian: Звёздочка) is a rural locality (a settlement) in Angarsky District, Irkutsk Oblast, Russia. Population: 49 (2010 census);

== Geography ==
This rural locality is located 27 kilometres (17 mi) from Angarsk (the district's administrative centre), 43 kilometres (27 mi) from Irkutsk (capital of Irkutsk Oblast) and 4,501 kilometres (2,797 mi) from Moscow. Savvateyevka is the nearest rural locality.
