= SumbandilaSat =

South African micro Earth observation satellite

- Mission type: Technology
- Operator: University of Stellenbosch
- COSPAR ID: 2009-049F
- SATCAT no.: 35870
- Mission duration: 3 years (planned); 1 year and 9 months (achieved)

Spacecraft properties
- Manufacturer: SunSpace
- Launch mass: 81 kilograms (179 lb)

Start of mission
- Launch date: 17 September 2009, 15:55:07 UTC
- Rocket: Soyuz-2-1b/Fregat
- Launch site: Baikonur Site 31/6

End of mission
- Disposal: Damaged by solar storm
- Last contact: 14 September 2011
- Decay date: 10 December 2021

Orbital parameters
- Reference system: Geocentric
- Regime: Low Earth
- Perigee altitude: 447.7 kilometres (278.2 mi)
- Apogee altitude: 449.8 kilometres (279.5 mi)
- Inclination: 97.1 degrees
- Period: 93.4 minutes
- Epoch: 24 May 2015

SumbandilaSat (sometimes just Sumbandila, formerly ZASAT-002, AMSAT designation SO-67), was a South African micro Earth observation satellite, launched on 17 September 2009 on a Soyuz-2 launch vehicle from the Baikonur Cosmodrome. The first part of the name, Sumbandila, is from the Venda language and means "lead the way".

The University of Stellenbosch, SunSpace and the CSIR (Council for Scientific and Industrial Research) were key players in constructing SumbandilaSat. The CSIR's Satellite Application Centre (CSIR-SAC) was responsible for operations, telemetry, tracking, control as well as data capturing.

SumbandilaSat was part of a closely integrated South African space programme and served as a research tool to investigate the viability of affordable space technology. Furthermore, the data was used to, amongst others, monitor and manage disasters such as flooding, oil spills and fires within Southern Africa.

In June 2011 the satellite was damaged during a solar storm. The damage caused the on-board computer and the camera to stop functioning. This has caused it to stop fulfilling its primary objective and it has been written off as a loss by SunSpace, its builder. The final data packet from the satellite was received on 14 September 2011.

== Launch site ==
The launch site was the Baikonur Cosmodrome LC-31/6, which is located at the following coordinates:

- 45°59′48″N 63°33′50″E

== Satellite specifications ==
General satellite specifications
Item	Specification
Imager	NER < 0.6% with a forward motion compensation (FMC) factor of 4:1
Imager	Operational MTF: >= 5% over the full field (excluding orbit motion effects)
Imager	GSD = 6.25m @ an orbit altitude of 500 km
Imager	6 spectral band (visible range) line scanner
Imager	Matrix sensor included for "snapshot" pictures
Imager	Image quantisation: 12-bit (data for each pixel stored as 2 bytes)
Image modes	Default scan mode with FMC = 4:1 but system could operate with FMC = 1:1 with consequent degradation in NER
Image modes	In FMC = 4:1 mode, non-contiguous scenes of 45 km x 45 km could be imaged (max 10 scenes in 6 spectral bands before data downloading was required)
Image modes	In FMC = 1:1 mode, a contiguous strip with 45 km swath could be imaged (max track length of 450 km could be imaged in 6 spectral bands before data downloading was required)
Imager data store	24 Gbyte
Image data downlink	Expected frequency implemented on satellite exploration S-band
Image data downlink	Link margin: 3 dB @ 10° (calculated with 0dBi satellite antenna; 5W Tx power and SAC GS parameters)
Image data downlink	Data rate sufficient to download full image data store during two night passes
Image data downlink	No real-time downloading of images (all images stored on board the satellite)
Viewfinder	Live downlinking of PAL video images during TT&C ground station passes
Viewfinder	PAL images selectable between B&W (narrow FOV) and two wider FOV colour PAL cameras
Viewfinder	Satellite bore-sight steerable with "joystick" interface
Viewfinder	Viewfinder mode could be interrupted with either image snapshot or image linescan modes upon ground command
Viewfinder	The bore-sight direction of the viewfinder was the same as the main imager
ADCS system	The satellite was 3-axis stabilised
ADCS system	System performance was sufficient to maintain pointing accuracy for image downloading
ADCS system	ADCS performance did not degrade image quality
ADCS system	The satellite bore-sight could be controlled to within 3 km on the ground
ADCS system	The intended system implementation used a combination of the following actuators and sensors: Horizon, fine-Sun, coarse-Sun sensors; star camera; magnetometer(s); fibre-optic gyros; reaction wheels and magneto torquers
ADCS system	A satellite slew manoeuvre from one stabilised position to another stabilised position, through an angle of 30°, could be completed in less than 1 minute
Propulsion System	Sufficient propellant included to maintain a satisfactory orbit for 3–4 years
Propulsion System	System was to demonstrate orbit constellation deployment as well as orbit maintenance
TT&C Communication Link	Expected frequencies implemented on commercial VHF uplink and UHF downlink
TT&C Communication Link	Link margin: 6 dB @ 5° (calculated with -12dBi satellite antenna null; 5W Tx power and 12dBi GS antenna gain)
Satellite Housekeeping	One TT&C GS pass per 24h was sufficient for the purpose of monitoring telemetry and uploading of new command sets and SW
Power	Energy source: solar panel with 65W (EOL) capacity
Power	Mission planning dictated energy requirements per orbit
Experiments	Provision was made for two 1-kg experiments
Experiments	SU certified the space environmental readiness of the experiments at MC level prior to integration
Experiments	Average power available per experiment: 1.2W (TBC)
Experiments	Peak power available per experiment: 10W (TBC)
Orbit lifetime	Design lifetime of 3 years at an orbit altitude of 500 km (subject to average Sun activity)
Orbit lifetime	Given the ultimate unpredictability of the space environment, the operational life varied from the design lifetime

* Courtesy of SunSpace

== On-board experiments ==
It had a number of secondary experimental payloads on board:

- Stellenbosch University — Architectural radiation experiment for commercial off the shelf devices and a software defined radio project.
- Nelson Mandela Metropolitan University — A forced vibrating string experiment.
- University of KwaZulu-Natal — Very low frequency (VLF) radio experiment.
- SA AMSAT — 2m/70 cm amateur radio transponder, parrot repeater and a voice beacon. The AMSAT designation of this payload is SO-67.

== See also ==
- SUNSAT, first South African satellite
