= Russian submarine Verkhoturye =

Russian Navy submarine

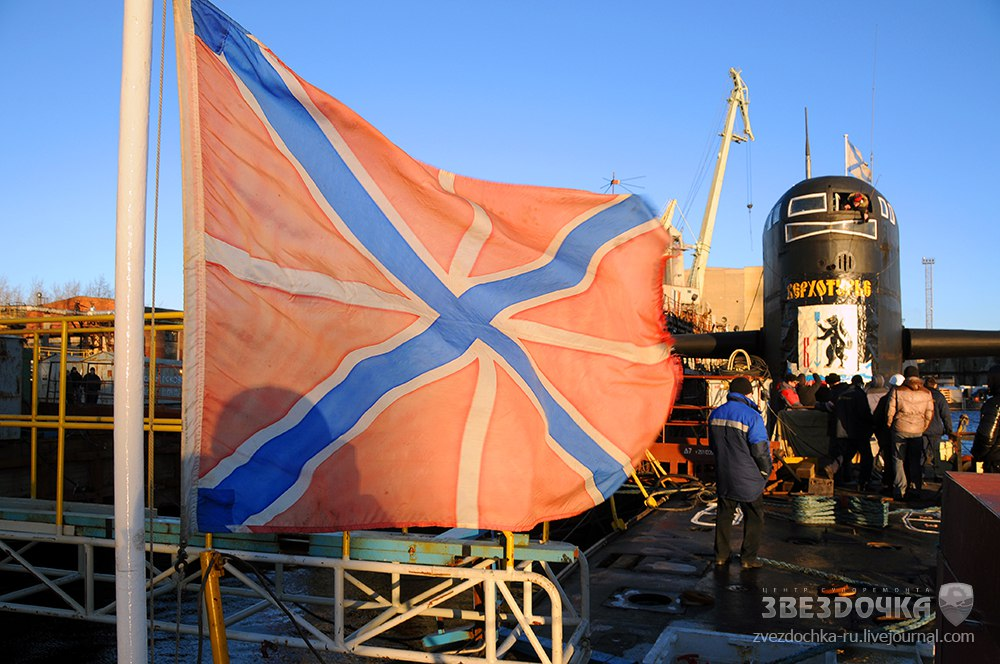
- K-51 before sea trials at Zvyozdochka, 2012

History

Soviet Union, Russia
- Name: K-51 Verkhoturye
- Namesake: Verkhoturye
- Builder: Sevmash, Severodvinsk
- Laid down: 23 February 1981
- Launched: 7 March 1984
- Commissioned: 28 December 1984
- Home port: Gadzhievo, Northern Fleet
- Status: Active

General characteristics
- Class & type: Delta IV-class ballistic missile submarine
- Displacement: 18,200 tonnes (17,900 long tons; 20,100 short tons)
- Length: 167 m (548 ft)
- Beam: 11.7 m (38 ft)
- Draft: 8.8 m (29 ft)
- Installed power: 2 × VM-4 pressurized water reactor180 MW (240,000 hp)
- Propulsion: 2 × type GT3A-365 turbines, two shafts with seven-bladed fixed-pitch propellers; Nuclear
- Speed: Surfaced: 14 knots (26 km/h; 16 mph); Submerged: 24 knots (44 km/h; 28 mph)
- Range: unlimited except by food supplies
- Endurance: 80 days
- Test depth: 550–650 m (1,800–2,130 ft)
- Complement: 135–140
- Sensors & processing systems: Snoop Tray surface search radar
- Armament: 16 × R-29RM Shtil nuclear ballistic missiles, RPK-7 Veter anti-ship missiles, 4 × 533-mm bow tubes for up to 12 torpedoes

K-51 Verkhoturye (Russian: К-51 Верхотурье) is the lead submarine of the Project 667BDRM Delfin class (NATO reporting name: Delta IV) nuclear-powered ballistic missile submarines currently in service with the Russian Navy. It was built at the Sevmash shipbuilding company in Severodvinsk between 1981 and 1984 and was commissioned in 1984. It is named after the city of Verkhoturye.

== Description ==
K-51 Verkhoturye has a length of 167.4 m (549 ft) overall, beam of 11.7 m (38 ft) and draft of 8.8 m (29 ft). It displaces 18,200 tonnes (17,900 long tons; 20,100 short tons) and can dive up to 550–650 m (1,800–2,130 ft). It carries a complement of 135–140 sailors.

Two VM-4 180 MW (240,000 hp) pressurized water reactors power the submarine, and drive two shafts with seven-bladed fixed-pitch propellers. They propel the submarine to the maximum speed of 14 knots (26 km/h; 16 mph) when surfaced and 24 knots (44 km/h; 28 mph) when submerged.

The boat's primary armament are the 16 R-29RM Shtil submarine-launched ballistic missiles which have the range of 8,300 km (5,200 mi). It also has four 533 mm bow tubes which can launch RPK-7 Veter anti-ship cruise missiles, and up to 12-18 torpedoes or 24 mines.

== Construction and service ==
Verkhoturye is the first submarine of the Delta-IV class. It was built at the Sevmash shipbuilding yard and launched under the name Imeni XXVI Siezda KPSS ("named after the 26th Congress of the CPSU") and was renamed as Verkhoturye in February 1999. The boat's keel was laid on 23 February 1981, it was launched on 7 March 1984 and was commissioned on 28 December 1984 into the Soviet Navy. The submarine was the test bed for the R-29RM submarine launched ballistic missile during 1985–1986. Between 2–29 September, it became the first submarine of the class to cruise to the Arctic Ocean while carrying missiles. After the Soviet Union's dissolution in 1991, the boat was transferred to the Russian Navy.

It underwent modernization twice, first in 1999, and then between 2010 and 2012. It re-entered service in December 2012 after the re-fit.

The submarine remained active as of 2025.
