= Russian submarine Svyatoy Georgiy Pobedonosets =

Delta III class Ballistic Missile Submarine built for Soviet/Russian Navy

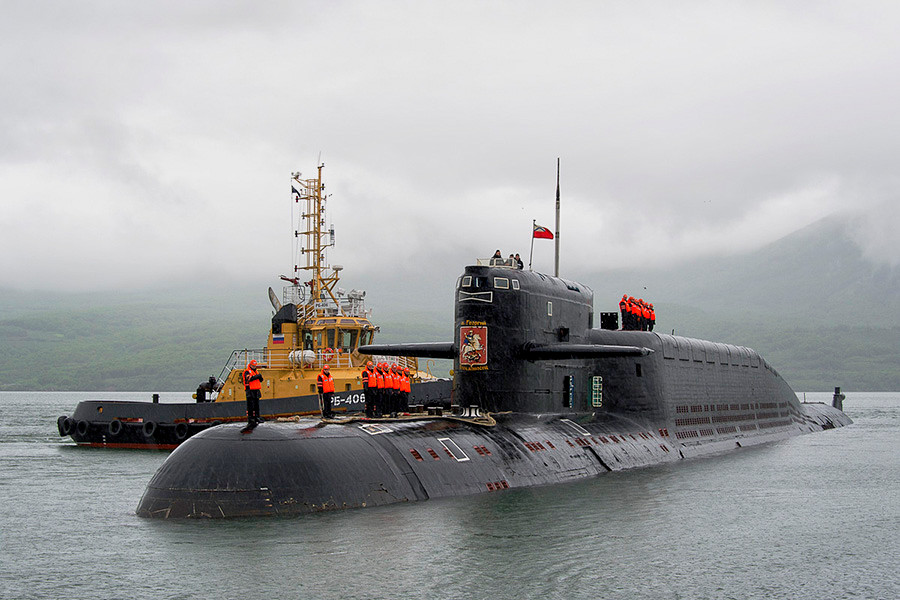

History

Russia
- Name: K-433 Svyatoy Georgiy Pobedonosets
- Namesake: Saint George the Victorious
- Laid down: 24 August 1978
- Launched: 20 June 1980
- Completed: 15 December 1980
- Commissioned: 1981
- Decommissioned: 1997
- Out of service: 2018
- Reinstated: 2004
- Fate: Retired from service

General characteristics
- Displacement: 13,500 tons; 18,200 tons
- Length: 166 m (544 ft 7 in)
- Beam: 12.3 m (39 ft 6 in)
- Draught: 8.8 m (29 ft)
- Installed power: 2 × pressurized water reactors
- Propulsion: 2 × steam turbines, 60,000 horsepower (45,000 kW)
- Speed: 14 kn (16 mph) surfaced; 24 kn (28 mph) submerged
- Complement: 135
- Armament: 16 R-29R (SS-N-18) missiles and four 533 millimetres (21.0 in) torpedo tubes

K-433 Svyatoy Georgiy Pobedonosets (Russian: К-433 «Святой Георгий Победоносец», lit. 'Saint George the Victorious') is a Russian Project 667BDR Kalmar class (NATO reporting name: Delta III) nuclear-powered ballistic missile submarine. The submarine was built for the Soviet Navy and has continued to serve in the Russian Navy. K-433 was put in reserve in 1997 and remained there until 2004 when it was recommissioned. As of 2018, it is on active duty.

The submarine is slated to be retired and replaced by the Borei class submarine in the coming years.

On October 28, 2010, the submarine carried out a successful R-29R missile test. The submarine sustained minor damage when a fishing vessel collided with it on September 22, 2011.

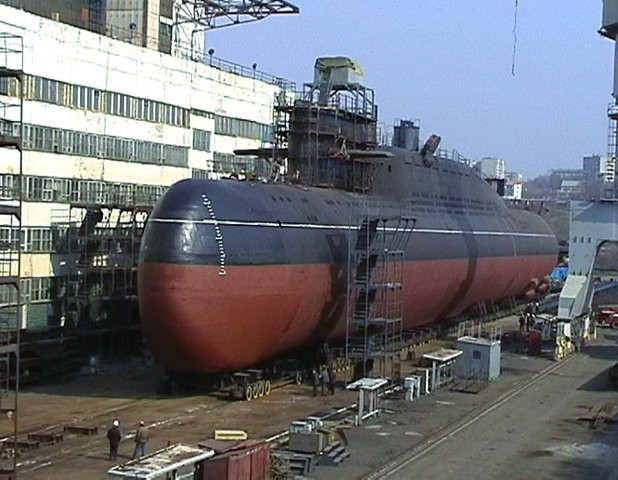
K-433 in drydock
