= Ship commissioning =

Ceremony placing a ship in active service

Ship commissioning is the act or ceremony of placing a ship in active service and may be regarded as a particular application of the general concepts and practices of project commissioning. The term is most commonly applied to placing a warship in active duty with its country's military forces. The ceremonies involved are often rooted in centuries-old naval tradition.

Ship naming and launching endow a ship hull with her identity, but many milestones remain before it is completed and considered ready to be designated a commissioned ship. The engineering plant, weapon and electronic systems, galley, and other equipment required to transform the new hull into an operating and habitable warship are installed and tested. The prospective commanding officer, ship's officers, the petty officers, and seamen who will form the crew report for training and familiarization with their new ship.

Before commissioning, the new ship undergoes sea trials to identify any deficiencies needing correction. The preparation and readiness time between christening-launching and commissioning may be as much as three years for a nuclear-powered aircraft carrier to as brief as twenty days for a World War II landing ship. USS Monitor, of American Civil War fame, was commissioned less than three weeks after launch.

== Pre-commissioning ==
Regardless of the type of ship in question, a vessel's journey towards commissioning in its nation's navy begins with a process known as sea trials. Sea trials usually take place some years after a vessel was laid down, and mark the interim step between the completion of a ship's construction and its official acceptance for service with its nation's navy.

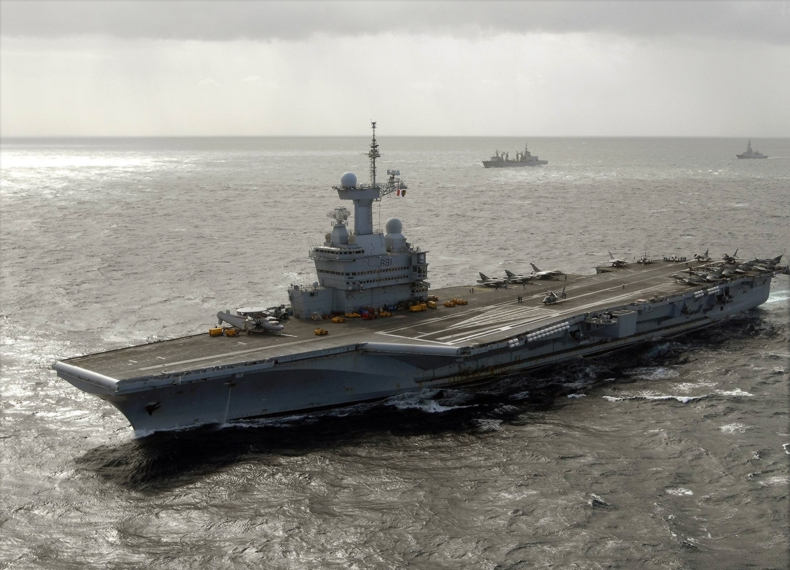
In 1999 the French carrier Charles De Gaulle began her sea trial phase, which identified the need for the flight deck to be extended for the safe operation of the E-2C Hawkeye.

Sea trials begin when the ship is floated out of its dry dock (or more rarely, moved by a vehicle to the sea from its construction hangar, as was the case with the submarine USS Virginia), at which time the initial crew for a ship (usually a skeleton crew composed of yard workers and naval personnel; in the modern era of increasingly complex ships the crew will include technical representatives of the ship builder and major system subcontractors) will assume command of the vessel in question. The ship is then sailed in littoral waters to test the design, equipment, and other ship specific systems to ensure that they work properly and can handle the equipment that they will be using in the future. Tests during this phase can include launching missiles from missile magazines, firing the ship's gun (if so equipped), conducting basic flight tests with rotary and fixed-wing aircraft that will be assigned to the ship, and various tests of the electronic and propulsion equipment. Often during this phase of testing problems arise relating to the state of the equipment on the ship, which can require returning to the builder's shipyard to address those concerns.

In addition to problems with a ship's arms, armament, and equipment, the sea trial phase a ship undergoes prior to commissioning can identify issues with the ship's design that may need to be addressed before it can be accepted into service. During her sea trials in 1999 French Naval officials determined that the French aircraft carrier Charles de Gaulle was too short to safely operate the E-2C Hawkeye, resulting in her return to the builder's shipyard for enlargement.

After a ship has successfully cleared its sea trial period, it will officially be accepted into service with its nation's navy. At this point, the ship in question will undergo a process of degaussing and/or deperming, to reduce the ship's magnetic signature.

== Commissioning ==
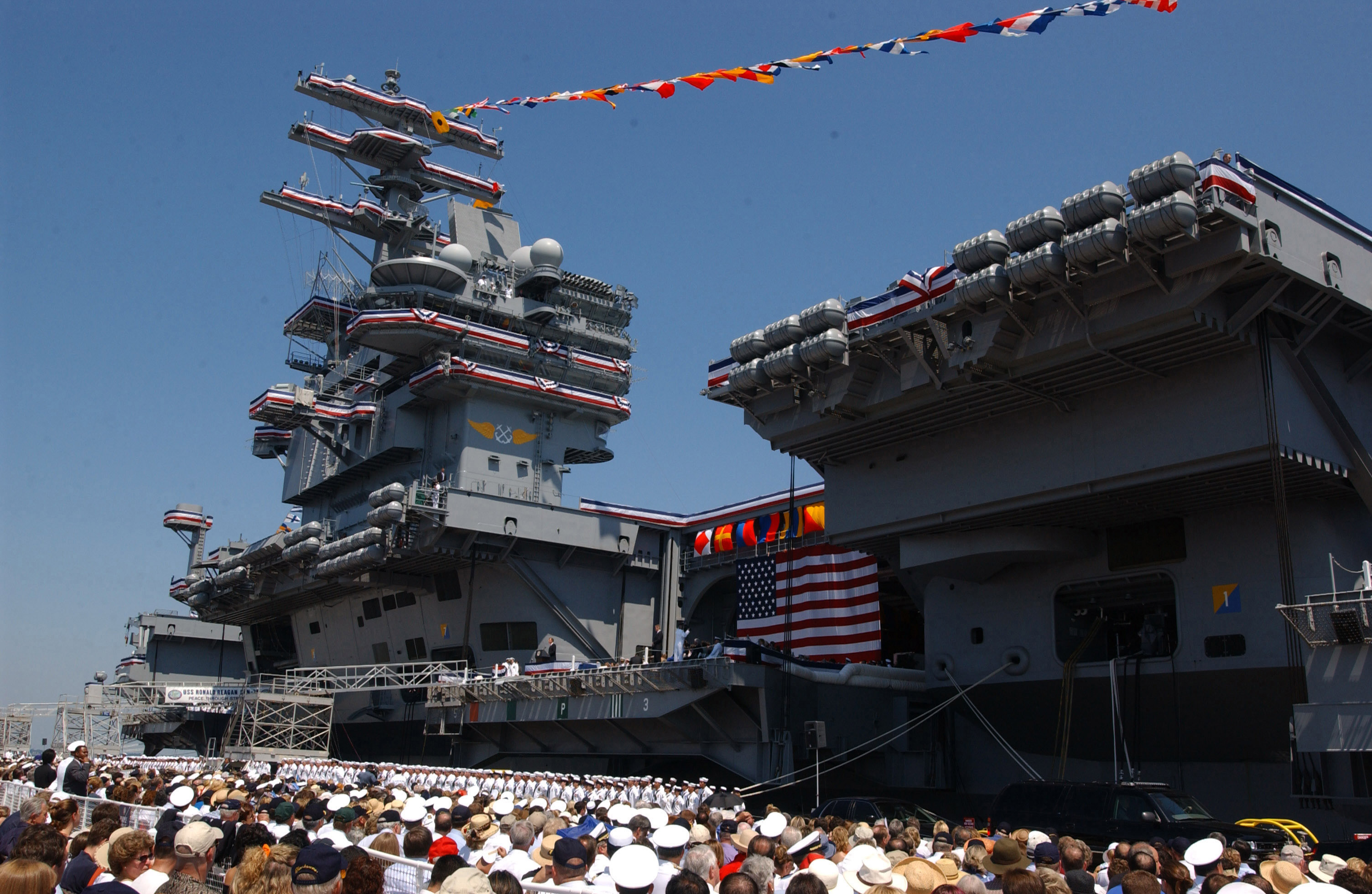
Hundreds attend the commissioning ceremony for the nuclear-powered aircraft carrier USS Ronald Reagan. Nancy Reagan, wife of the ship's namesake, gave the ship's crew its traditional first order as an active unit of the Navy: "Man the ship and bring her to life."

Once a ship's sea trials are successfully completed, plans for the commissioning ceremony will take shape. Depending on the naval traditions of the nation in question, the commissioning ceremony may be an elaborately planned event with guests, the ship's future crew, and other persons of interest in attendance, or the nation may forgo a ceremony and administratively place the ship in commission.

At a minimum, on the day on which the ship is to be commissioned the crew will report for duty aboard the ship and the commanding officer will read through the orders given for the ship and its personnel. If the ship's ceremony is a public affair, the Captain may make a speech to the audience, along with other VIPs as the ceremony dictates. Religious ceremonies, such as blessing the ship or the singing of traditional hymns or songs may also occur.

Once a ship has been commissioned its final step toward becoming an active unit of the navy it serves is to report to its home port and officially load or accept any remaining equipment (such as munitions).

== Decommissioning ==
To decommission a ship is to terminate its career in service in the armed forces of a nation. Unlike wartime ship losses, in which a vessel lost to enemy action is said to be struck, decommissioning confers that the ship has reached the end of its economical service life and is being retired from a country's navy. Depending on the naval traditions of the country, a ceremony commemorating the decommissioning of the ship may take place, or the vessel may be removed administratively with minimal fanfare. The term "paid off" is alternatively used in British and Commonwealth contexts, originating in the age-of-sail practice of ending an officer's commission and paying crew wages once the ship completed its voyage.

Ship decommissioning usually occurs some years after the ship was commissioned and is intended to serve as a means by which a vessel that has become too old or obsolete can be retired with honor from the country's armed forces. Decommissioning of the vessel may also occur due to treaty agreements (such as the Washington Naval Treaty) or for safety reasons (such as a ship's nuclear reactor and associated parts reaching the end of their service life), depending on the type of ship being decommissioned. In a limited number of cases a ship may be decommissioned if the vessel in question is judged to be damaged beyond economical repair, as was the case with USS Hugh W. Hadley, or USS Halibut. In rare cases, a navy or its associated country may recommission or leave a ship that is old or obsolete in commission with the regular force rather than decommissioning the vessel in question due to the historical significance or public sentiment for the ship in question. This is the case with the ships USS Constitution and HMS Victory. Vessels preserved in this manner typically do not relinquish their names to other, more modern ships that may be in the design, planning, or construction phase of the parent nation's navy.

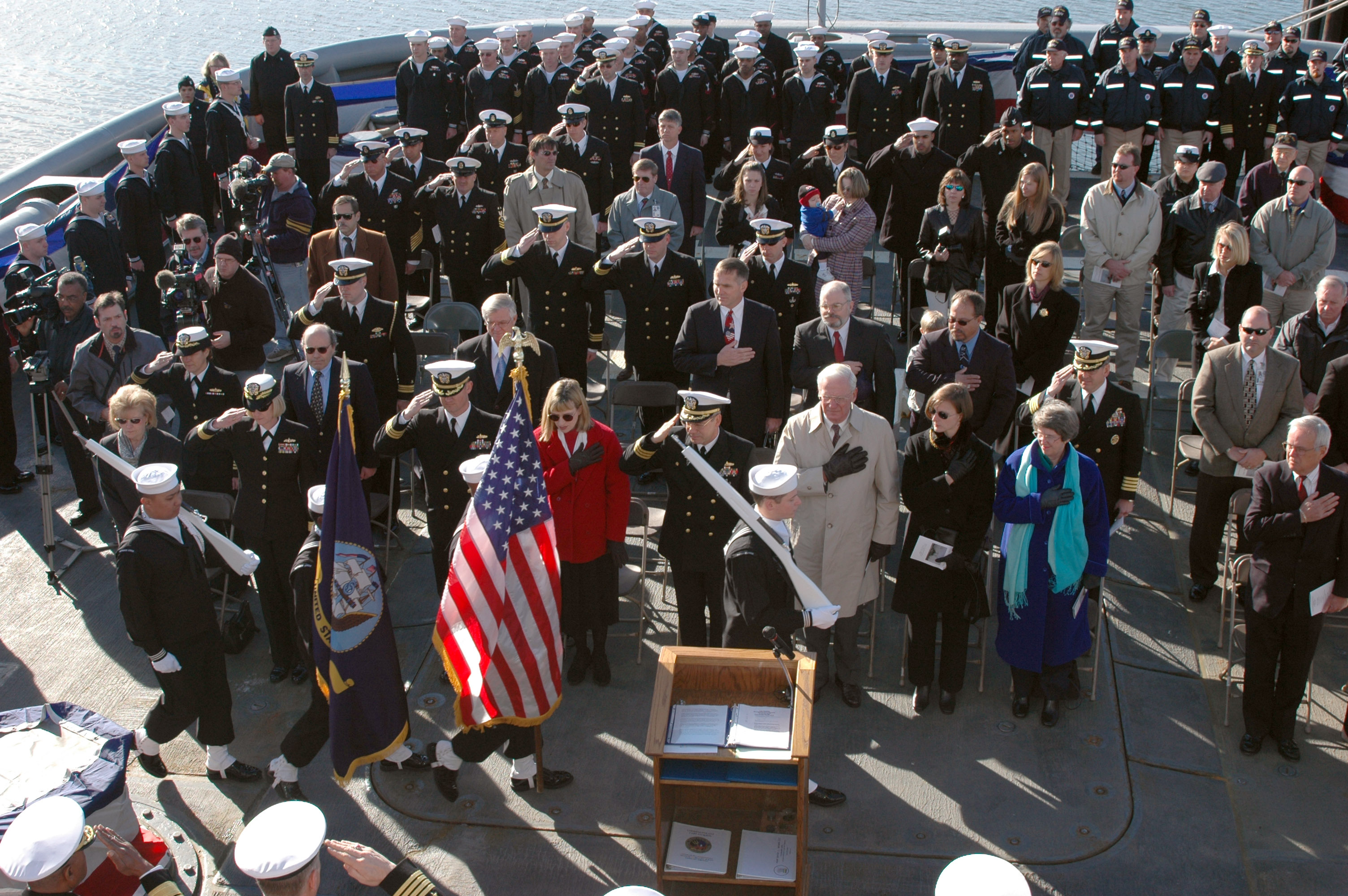
Crew members and guests salute as the colors are paraded at the decommissioning ceremony of the salvage and rescue ship Grasp

Prior to its formal decommissioning, the ship in question will begin the process of decommissioning by going through a preliminary step called inactivation or deactivation. During this phase, a ship will report to a naval facility owned by the country to permit the ship's crew to offload, remove, and dismantle the ship's weapons, ammunition, electronics, and other material that is judged to be of further use to the nation. The removed material from a ship usually ends up either rotating to another ship in the class with similar weapons and/or capabilities, or in storage pending a decision on equipment's fate. During this time a ship's crew may be thinned out via transfers and reassignments as the ongoing removal of equipment renders certain personnel (such as missile technicians or gun crews) unable to perform their duties on the ship in question. Certain aspects of a ship's deactivation – such as the removal or deactivation of a ship's nuclear weapons capabilities – may be governed by international treaties, which can result in the presence of foreign officials authorized to inspect the weapon or weapon system to ensure compliance with treaties. Other aspects of a ship's decommissioning, such as the reprocessing of nuclear fuel from a ship utilizing a nuclear reactor or the removal of hazardous materials from a ship, are handled by the government according to the nation's domestic policies. When a ship finishes its inactivation, it is then formally decommissioned, after which the ship is usually towed to a storage facility.

In addition to the economic advantages of retiring a ship that has grown maintenance intensive or obsolete, the decommissioning frees up the name used by the ship, allowing vessels currently in the planning or building stages to inherit the name of that warship. Often, but not always, ships that are decommissioned spend the next few years in a reserve fleet before their ultimate fate is decided.

== Practices by nation ==
=== United States Navy ===
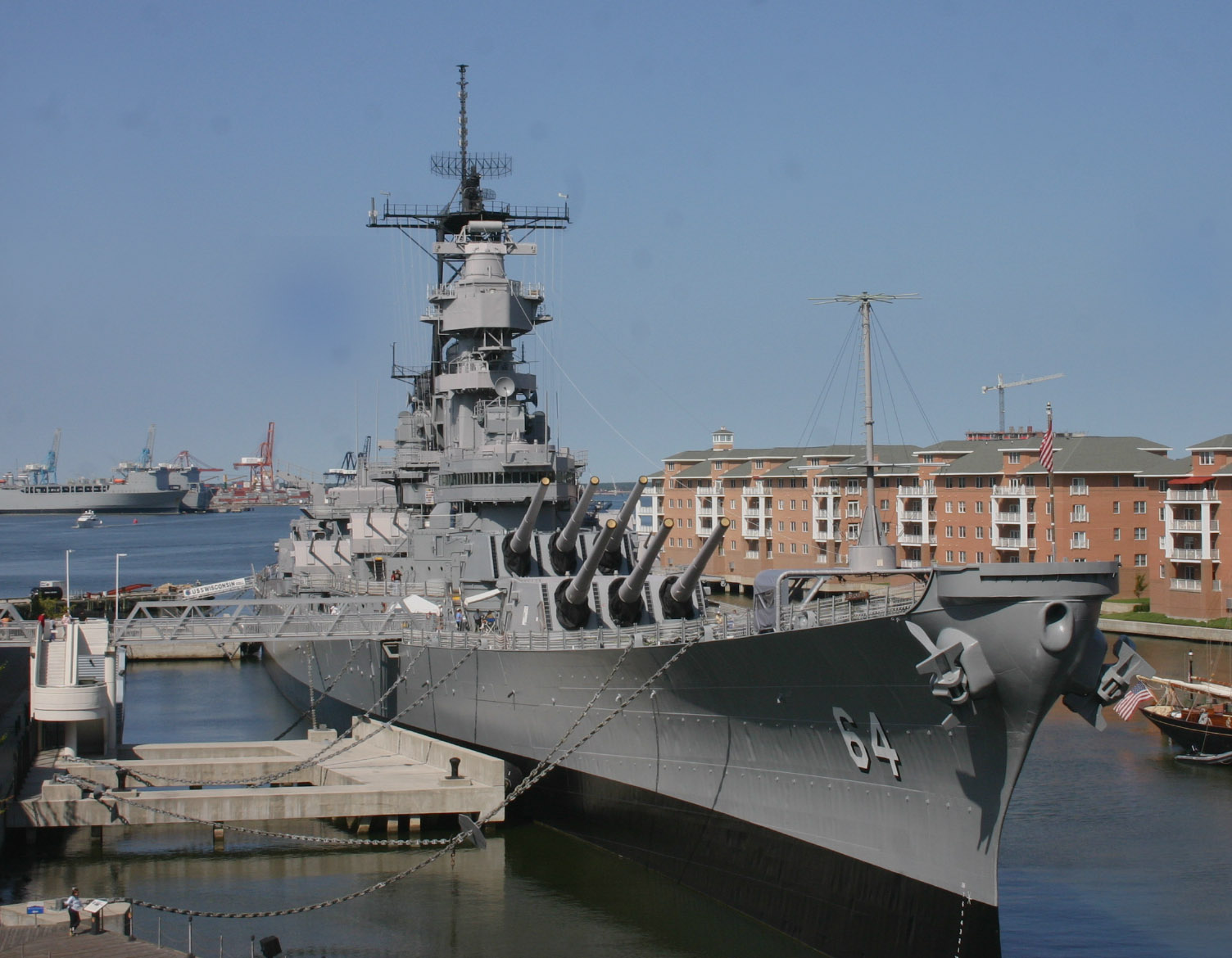
Ships may enter preservation as museum ships after being decommissioned, as seen here with USS Wisconsin, on display at Nauticus in Norfolk, Virginia.

Commissioning in the early United States Navy under sail was attended by no ceremony. An officer designated to command a new ship received orders similar to those issued to Captain Thomas Truxtun in 1798:

Sir, I have it in command from the president of the United States, to direct you to repair with all due speed on board the ship Constellation lying at Baltimore. It is required that no Time be lost in carrying the Ship into deep water, taking on board her Cannon, Ammunition, Water, Provisions & Stores of every kind — completing what work is yet to be done shipping her Complement of Seamen and Marines, and preparing her in every respect for Sea ... It is the President's express Orders, that you employ the most vigorous Exertions, to accomplish these several Objects and to put your Ship as speedily as possible in a situation to sail at the shortest notice.

In Truxtun's time, the prospective commanding officer had responsibility for overseeing construction details, outfitting the ship, and recruiting his crew. When a captain determined that his new ship was ready to take to sea, he mustered the crew on deck, read his orders, broke the national ensign and distinctive commissioning pennant, and caused the watch to be set and the first entry to be made in the log. Thus, the ship was placed in commission.

Commissionings were not public affairs, and unlike christening-and-launching ceremonies, were not recorded by newspapers. The first specific reference to commissioning located in naval records is a letter of November 6, 1863, from Secretary of the Navy Gideon Welles to all navy yards and stations. The Secretary directed: "Hereafter the commandants of navy yards and stations will inform the Department, by special report of the date when each vessel preparing for sea service at their respective commands, is placed in commission."

Subsequently, various editions of Navy regulations mentioned the act of putting a ship in commission, but details of a commissioning ceremony were not prescribed. Through custom and usage, a fairly standard practice emerged, the essentials of which are outlined in current Navy regulations. Craft assigned to Naval Districts and shore bases for local use, such as harbor tugs and floating drydocks, are not usually placed in commission but are instead given an "in service" status. They do fly the national ensign, but not a commissioning pennant.

In modern times, officers and crew members of a new warship are assembled on the quarterdeck or other suitable area. Formal transfer of the ship to the prospective commanding officer is done by the Chief of Naval Operations or his representative. The national anthem is played, the transferring officer reads the commissioning directive, the ensign is hoisted, and the commissioning pennant broken. The prospective commanding officer reads his orders, assumes command, and the first watch is set. Following, the sponsor is traditionally invited to give the first order to the ship's company: "Man our ship and bring her to life!", whereupon the ship's assigned crew would run on board and man the rails of the ship.

In recent years, commissionings have become more public occasions. Most commonly assisted by a Commissioning Support Team (CST), the Prospective Commanding Officer and ship's crew, shipbuilder executives, and senior Navy representatives gather for a formal ceremony placing the ship in active service (in commission). Guests, including the ship's sponsor, are frequently invited to attend, and a prominent individual delivers a commissioning address. On May 3, 1975, more than 20,000 people witnessed the commissioning of USS Nimitz at Norfolk, Virginia. The carrier's sponsor, daughter of Fleet Admiral Chester Nimitz, was introduced, and U.S. President Gerald R. Ford was the principal speaker.

Regardless of the type of ship, the brief commissioning ceremony completes the cycle from christening and launching to bring the ship into full status as a warship of her nation.

== See also ==
- Shakedown cruise
- Decommissioning of Russian nuclear-powered vessels
- Lists of ship commissionings and decommissionings
