= Zvyozdochka =

Zvyozdochka (Russian: Звёздочка) is the name of several inhabited localities in Russia.

Urban localities

- Zvyozdochka, Sakha Republic, an urban-type settlement in Ust-Maysky District of the Sakha Republic

Rural localities

- Zvyozdochka, Irkutsk Oblast, a settlement in Angarsky District of Irkutsk Oblast
- Zvyozdochka, Krasnodar Krai, a khutor in Krasnoselsky Rural Okrug of Kushchyovsky District in Krasnodar Krai; 46°47′N 39°35′E

Industry

- Zvezdochka (company) shipbuilding yard, repair.
