= Delta-class submarine =

Class of Russian nuclear powered ballistic submarines

External videos
- on RT Documentary Official YouTube Channel(in English)
- K-433 Svyatoy Georgiy Pobedonosets: Nuclear Triad Workhorse on YouTube

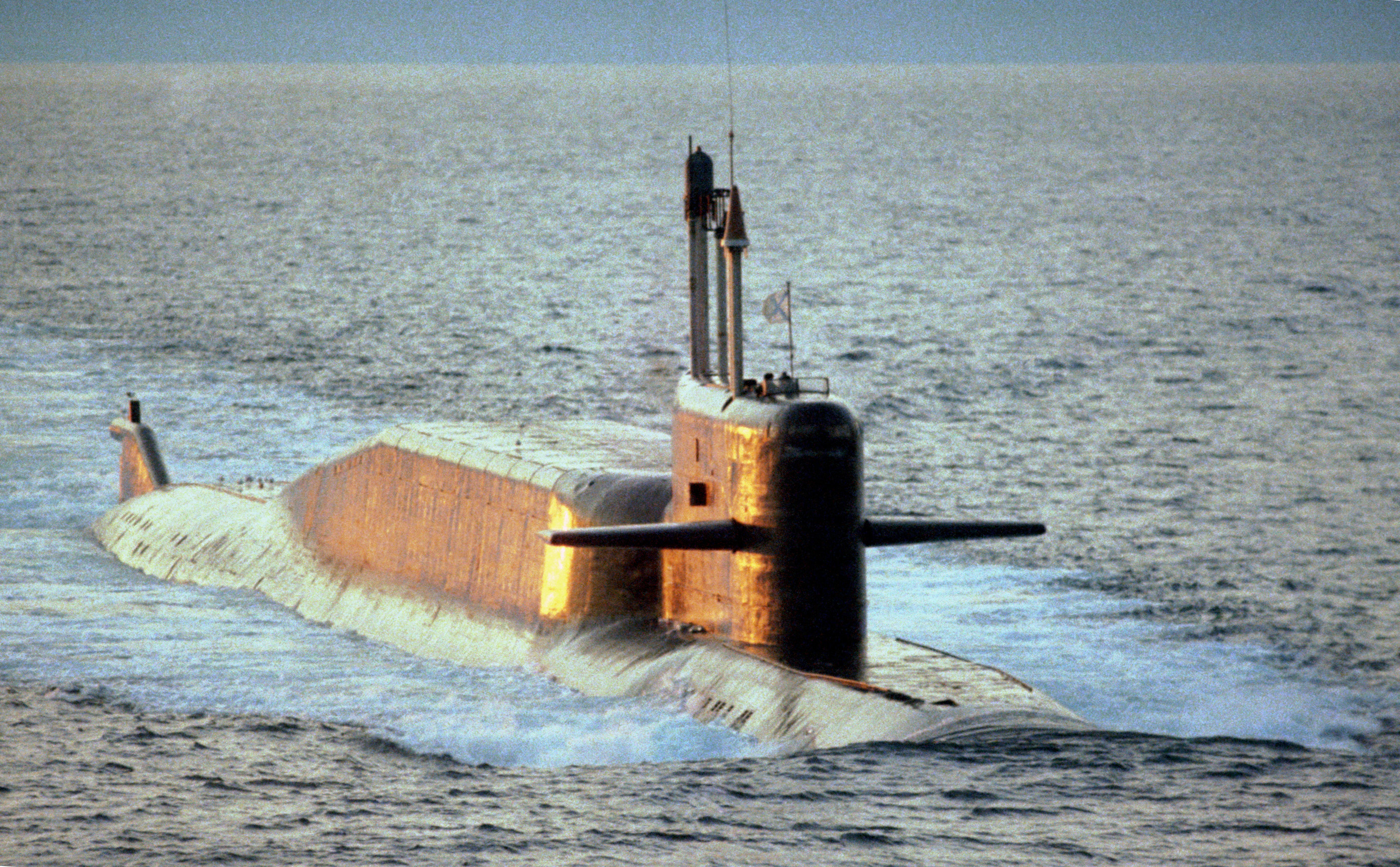
A Delta IV-class nuclear-powered ballistic missile submarine

The Delta class, (Russian: Дельта) Soviet designations Project 667B Murena, Project 667BD Murena-M, Project 667BDR Kalmar, Project 667BDRM Delfin, (NATO reporting names Delta I, Delta II, Delta III, Delta IV respectively) are a family of nuclear-powered ballistic missile submarines, designed and built in the Soviet Union, which formed the backbone of the Soviet and Russian strategic submarine fleet since their introduction in 1973. They carry nuclear ballistic missiles of the R-29 Vysota family, with the Delta I, Delta II, Delta III and Delta IV classes carrying the R-29/SS-N-8 'Sawfly', R-29D/SS-N-8 'Sawfly', R-29R/SS-N-18 'Stingray' and R-29RM/SS-N-23 'Skiff' (and later on improved versions) respectively.

The Soviets viewed the Deltas as an iterative improvement of the Yankee-class submarines, which carried R-27 Zyb missiles with a range of 2,500–3,000 km (1,600–1,900 mi). The R-29s gave the Deltas much needed standoff distance; with a range of 7,700 km (4,800 mi) the Deltas were able to perform their deterrence patrols within relative safety of the Arctic Ocean, while the Yankee-class had to patrol off the US coastline to do so. The Deltas were supplemented by the largest submarines ever built, the Typhoon-class submarines, which served as guarantors of the Soviet second strike capability. The earlier Delta boats remained in service until the 1990s, when the Soviet Union ceased to exist and many classes of submarines were decommissioned due to the severe budget cuts that resulted. A few Delta-IIIs and all of the Delta-IVs were retained by the nascent Russian Navy.

34 boats were built and commissioned during 1972–1990; approximately five or six remain active in 2023. A handful were converted into special-purpose submarines operated by GUGI.

== Development ==
In the 1960s the Soviet Navy wanted new submarine-launched nuclear missiles that could threaten targets in North America without their launch platforms needing to pass the SOSUS sensors in the GIUK gap to be within range. The resulting project was an iterative improvement of the Project 667A Navaga; The 667B could accommodate larger, more capable missiles within its enlarged dorsal hump.

== Delta I (Project 667B Murena) 18 boats ==
- A Delta I-class submarine

Class overview
- Name: Delta I class
- Builders: Komsomolsk-on-Amur; Severodvinsk
- Operators: Soviet Union
- Preceded by: Yankee class
- Succeeded by: Delta II class
- Built: 1965-?
- In service: 1972-2004
- Completed: 18
- Retired: 18

General characteristics
- Displacement: Surfaced: 7,800 tons; Submerged: 10,000 tons
- Length: 139 m (456 ft)
- Beam: 12 m (39 ft 4 in)
- Draught: 9 m (29 ft 6 in)
- Propulsion: 2 pressurized water-cooled reactors powering 2 steam turbines driving 2 shafts and each developing 38.7 MW (51,900 shp)
- Speed: Surfaced: 12 knots (22 km/h; 14 mph); Submerged: 25 knots (46 km/h; 29 mph)
- Range: Unlimited, except by food supplies
- Complement: 120
- Armament: D-9 launch tubes for 12 R-29 (SS-N-8 Sawfly) SLBMs; 4 × 533 mm (21 in) torpedo tubes; 2 × 400 mm (16 in) torpedo tubes

The Project 667B Murena/Delta I submarines could deploy on combat patrols in the marginal sea ice of the Soviet Arctic coastal zone, and often patrolled in the Norwegian and Barents Seas. Consequently, unlike their predecessors, they no longer needed to pass through Western SOSUS sonar barriers to come within range of their targets. To improve the accuracy of the missiles, the Delta I-class submarines carry the Tobol-B navigation system and the Cyclone-B satellite navigation system.

After construction was authorized in 1965, the first Delta I, K-279, was commissioned into the Soviet Northern Fleet on 22 December 1972. A total of 18 submarines of this class were built, and all served the Soviet Navy.

In 1991, nine Delta I-class submarines were still in active service. Their decommissioning began in 1994, with removal of the missile compartments scheduled by 1997. All submarines of this class were taken out of service by 2004 and were scrapped by 2005. The last active submarine of this project was the K-447 Kislovodsk, which was in service for more than 30 years and was decommissioned on March 5, 2004.

The 400 mm (16 in) tubes carry either the MG-44 swimming noise-simulation sonar decoy or the SET-40 anti-submarine torpedo.

== Delta II (Project 667BD Murena-M) 4 boats ==
- A Delta II-class submarine

Class overview
- Name: Delta II class
- Builders: Severodvinsk
- Operators: Soviet Union
- Preceded by: Delta I class
- Succeeded by: Delta III class
- Built: 1964-1974
- In service: ?-1996
- Completed: 4
- Retired: 4

General characteristics
- Displacement: Surfaced: 9,350 tons; Submerged: 10,500 tons
- Length: 155 m (508 ft 6 in)
- Beam: 12 m (39 ft 4 in)
- Draught: 9 m (29 ft 6 in)
- Propulsion: 2 pressurized water-cooled reactors powering 2 steam turbines driving 2 shafts each developing 41 MW (55,000 shp)
- Speed: Surfaced: 12 knots (22 km/h; 14 mph); Submerged: 24 knots (44 km/h; 28 mph)
- Range: Unlimited, except by food supplies
- Complement: 130
- Armament: D-9D launch tubes for 16 R-29D SLBMs; 4 × 533 mm (21 in) torpedo tubes; 2 × 400 mm (16 in) torpedo tubes

The 667BD Murena-M/Delta II submarines were designed to remedy the shortcomings of the Delta I submarine. The platform was largely the same, but the submarine was lengthened in the fourth and fifth compartments by 16 meters (52 ft) to allow the installation of four more missile tubes. The Delta-IIs also received additional quieting measures such as mounting the steam turbines on shock absorbers, having all pipes and hydraulics separated from the hull through rubber insulation, and a special hydroacoustic coating being applied to the hull.

Only four submarines of this class were built between 1964 and 1974, apparently in favor of building the following class, the Delta III, and all Delta IIs were out of service by 1996.

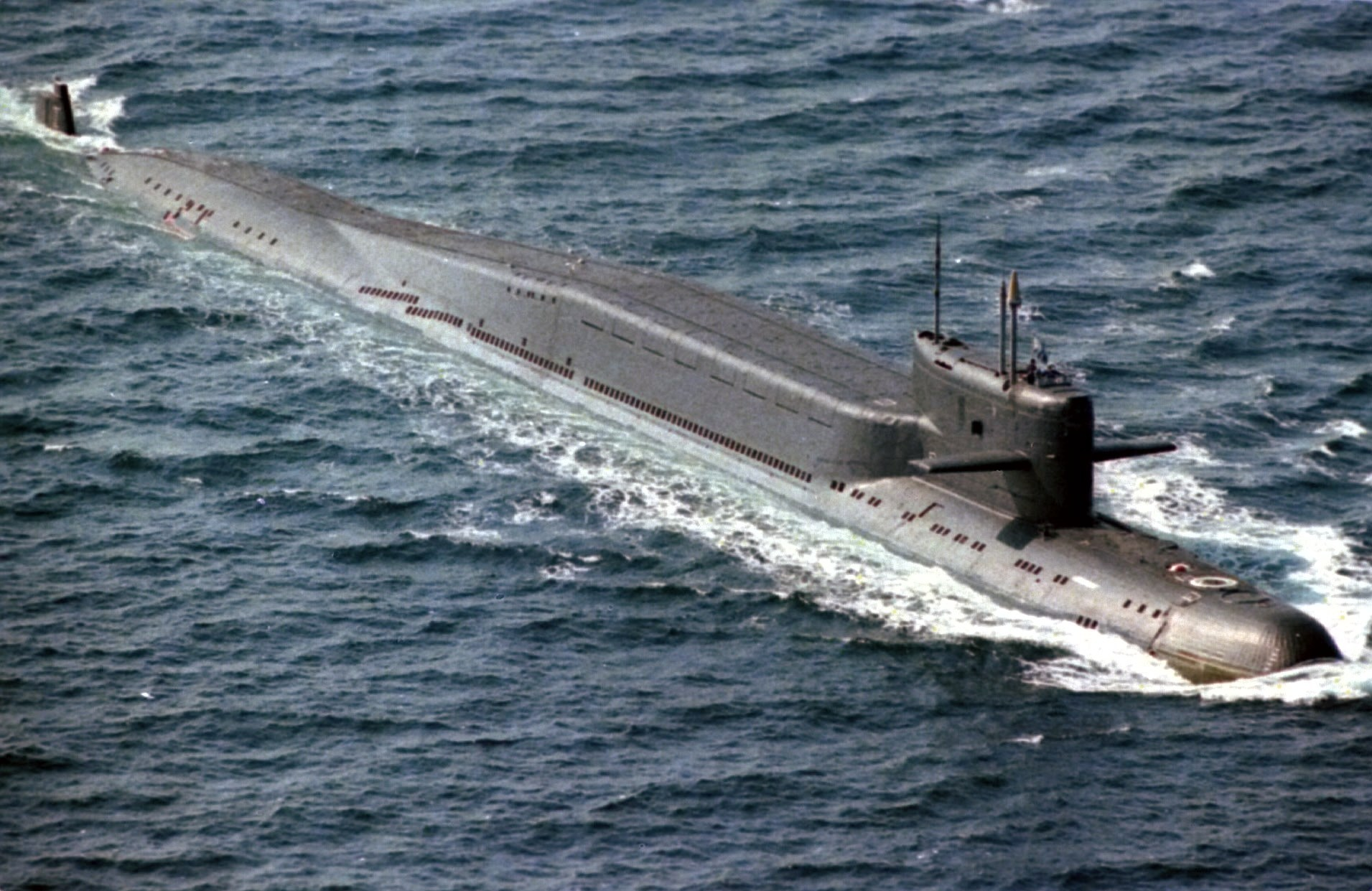
Delta-II-class, 1997

== Delta III (Project 667BDR Kalmar) 14 boats ==
- A Delta III-class submarine

Class overview
- Name: Delta III class
- Builders: Severodvinsk
- Operators: Soviet Union, Russia
- Preceded by: Delta II class
- Succeeded by: Typhoon class & Delta IV class
- Built: 1974-1982
- In service: 1976-present
- Completed: 14
- Active: 1

General characteristics
- Displacement: Surfaced: 13,500 tons; Submerged: 18,200 tons
- Length: 166 m (544 ft 7 in)
- Beam: 12.3 m (40 ft 4 in)
- Draught: 8.8 m (29 ft)
- Propulsion: 2 pressurized water-cooled reactors powering 2 steam turbines delivering 44,700 kW (59,900 shp) to 2 five-bladed fixed-pitched shrouded propellers.
- Speed: Surfaced: 14 knots (26 km/h; 16 mph); Submerged: 24 knots (44 km/h; 28 mph)
- Range: Unlimited, except by food supplies
- Complement: 135
- Armament: 16 missiles; 4 × bow 533 mm (21.0 in) torpedo tubes

The 667BDR Kalmar/Delta III-class submarine is a further development of Project 667, maintaining the double-hulled design with a thin, low magnetic steel outer hull wrapped around a thicker inner pressure hull. Development began in 1972 at the Rubin Central Design Bureau for Marine Engineering. The submarine was the first that could launch any number of missiles in a single salvo, as well as the first submarine capable of carrying ballistic missiles with multiple independently targetable reentry vehicles. The submarine carried 16 of the R-29R missiles each carrying 3 to 7 MIRVs, with a range of 6,500 to 8,000 km (4,000 to 5,000 mi), depending on the number of re-entry vehicles.

As of 2023 two Delta-IIIs remain; K-44 Ryazan, and the heavily modified BS-136 Orenburg.

== Delta IV (Project 667BDRM Delfin) 7 boats ==
- A Delta IV-class submarine

Class overview
- Name: Delta IV class
- Builders: Severodvinsk
- Operators: Soviet Union, Russian Federation
- Preceded by: Delta III & Typhoon classes
- Succeeded by: Borei class
- Built: 1981-1992
- In commission: 1984-present
- Completed: 7
- Active: 6

General characteristics
- Propulsion: 2 pressurized water-cooled reactors powering 2 steam turbines with two fixed-pitched shrouded propellers.
- Speed: Surfaced: 14 knots (26 km/h; 16 mph); Submerged: 24 knots (44 km/h; 28 mph)
- Range: Unlimited, except by food supplies
- Armament: 16 R-29RMU Sineva ballistic missiles; each with 4 MIRV; 4 × bow 533 mm (21.0 in) torpedo tubes

Seven Project 667BDRM Delfin/Delta IV-class submarines were built, which were yet another iterative improvement of the Delta-class. All were retained and operated by the Russian Navy. The submarines, based at the Sayda Guba Naval Base, operate in the Northern Fleet. The Severodvinsk Shipyard built these vessels between 1981 and 1992. The last vessel completed was K-407 Novomoskovsk.

=== Armament ===
The Delta IV-class submarines employs the D-9RM launch system and carries 16 R-29RMU Sineva liquid-fueled missiles which each carry four independently targetable reentry vehicles (MIRVs). Unlike previous modifications, the Delta IV-class submarine is able to fire missiles in any direction from a constant course in a circular sector. The underwater firing of the ballistic missiles can be conducted at a depth of 55 meters (180 ft) while cruising at a speed of 6–7 knots (11–13 km/h; 6.9–8.1 mph). All the missiles can be fired in a single salvo.

The 667BDRM Delfin submarines are equipped with the TRV-671 RTM missile-torpedo system that has four bow-mounted torpedo tubes with a calibre of 533 mm (21 in). Unlike the Delta III-class design, it is compatible with all types of torpedoes, anti-submarine torpedo-missiles and anti-hydroacoustic devices. The battle management system Omnibus-BDRM controls all combat activities, processing data and commanding the torpedo and missile-torpedo weapons. The Shlyuz navigation system provides for the improved accuracy of the missiles and is capable of stellar navigation at periscope depths. The navigational system also employs two floating antenna buoys to receive radio messages, target destination data and satellite navigation signals at great depth. The submarines are also equipped with the Skat-VDRM hydroacoustic system.

The Delta IVs executed Operation Behemoth (Russian: Бегемот) during the twilight of the Soviet Union; they remain the only class of SSBN to successfully fire its entire payload of ballistic missiles.

In 2011 K-84 Ekaterinburg successfully test-fired a new version of the SS-N-23 missile, reportedly designated R-29RMU2 Layner. The missile has improved survivability against anti-ballistic missiles. Later on K-114 Tula conducted another successful launch.

=== Deployment ===
Initially all the Delta IV-class submarines were based with the Russian Northern Fleet at Olenya Bay. All the submarines of this class serve in 12th Squadron (the former 3rd flotilla) of strategic submarines of the Northern Fleet, which now located in Yagelnaya Bay.

Delta IV class — Ships of the class
#	Shipyard	Name	Laid down	Launched	Com-missioned	Fleet	Status
K-51	SEVMASH, Severodvinsk	Verkhoturye	23 Feb 1981	7 Mar 1984	28 Dec 1984	Northern	Active as of 2025; upgraded Sineva missiles installed
K-84	SEVMASH, Severodvinsk	Ekaterinburg	17 Feb 1982	17 Mar 1985	30 Dec 1985	Northern	Inactive. Upgraded Sineva missiles installed, overhaul 2011–14 (29 December 2011 a fire broke out while ship was drydocked and the vessel was partially submerged to control the flames.) Re-commissioned in December 2014. Removed from active service and prepared for decommissioning in 2020
BS-64 (ex K-64)	SEVMASH, Severodvinsk	Podmoskovye	18 Dec 1982	2 Feb 1986	23 Dec 1986	Northern	Active as of 2026; in 1999–2016 was in conversion to a Project 09787 special purpose platform. Cut out all the missile silos.
K-114	SEVMASH, Severodvinsk	Tula	22 Feb 1984	22 Jan 1987	30 Oct 1987	Northern	Active as of 2025 In overhaul 2014–2017, returned to active duty in Dec 2017, upgraded Sineva missiles installed
K-117	SEVMASH, Severodvinsk	Bryansk	20 Apr 1985	8 Feb 1988	30 Sep 1988	Northern	Active as of 2025; overhaul 2002–08, overhaul complete, upgraded Sineva missiles installed. Technical conditioning to extend service life by 3.5 years scheduled to commence post Mar 2018.
K-18	SEVMASH, Severodvinsk	Karelia	7 Feb 1986	2 Feb 1989	10 Oct 1989	Northern	Completed major modernization in 2026
K-407	SEVMASH, Severodvinsk	Novomoskovsk	2 Feb 1987	28 Feb 1990	27 Nov 1990	Northern	Active as of 2025; overhaul 2008–2012 upgraded Sineva missiles installed

== See also ==
- List of Soviet and Russian submarine classes
- Future of the Russian Navy
- Submarine-launched ballistic missile
