= Sayda-Guba =

Sayda-Guba Сайда-Губа
- Inhabited locality
- Interactive map of Sayda-Guba
- Location of Sayda-Guba Sayda-Guba (Murmansk Oblast)
- Coordinates: 69°15′N 33°14′E
- Country: Russia
- Federal subject: Murmansk Oblast
- Elevation: 10 m (33 ft)

Population (2010 Census)
  - Total: 0
  - Estimate (2010): 0 )

Administrative status
  - Subordinated to: Closed Administrative-Territorial Formation of Alexandrovsk

Municipal status
  - Urban okrug: Alexandrovsk Urban Okrug
- Time zone: UTC+3 (MSK)
- Postal code: 184670
- OKTMO ID: 47737000121

Sayda-Guba (Russian: Сайда-Губа; English: Sayda Bay) is a rural locality (an inhabited locality) within the administrative jurisdiction of the closed administrative-territorial formation of Alexandrovsk in Murmansk Oblast, Russia, located beyond the Arctic Circle at a height of 10 meters (33 ft) above sea level. As of the 2010 Census, it had no recorded population.

== History ==
The colony of Sayda-Guba was one of the twenty-one included into Alexandrovskaya Volost of Alexandrovsky Uyezd of Arkhangelsk Governorate upon its establishment on July 1, 1920.

In 1934, the Murmansk Okrug Executive Committee developed a redistricting proposal, which was approved by the Resolution of the 4th plenary session of the Murmansk Okrug Committee of the VKP(b) on December 28-29, 1934 and by the Resolution of the Presidium of the Murmansk Okrug Executive Committee on February 2, 1935. On February 15, 1935, the VTsIK approved the redistricting of the okrug into seven districts, but did not specify what territories the new districts were to include. On February 26, 1935, the Presidium of the Leningrad Oblast Executive Committee worked out the details of the new district scheme and issued a resolution, which, among other things, ordered the administrative center of Polyarny District to be moved from Polyarnoye to Sayda-Guba. The provisions of the February 26, 1935 Resolution, however, were not fully implemented. Due to military construction in Polyarnoye, the administrative center was instead moved to Murmansk in the beginning of 1935.

== Reactor vessel disposal ==
Sayda-Guba now serves as the storage location for reactor compartments from decommissioned Russian nuclear submarines. This compares with United States Navy storage of reactor compartments at the United States Department of Energy Hanford Nuclear Reservation under the Ship-Submarine Recycling Program.
