= Russian submarine Dmitry Donskoy (TK-208) =

Ballistic missile submarine

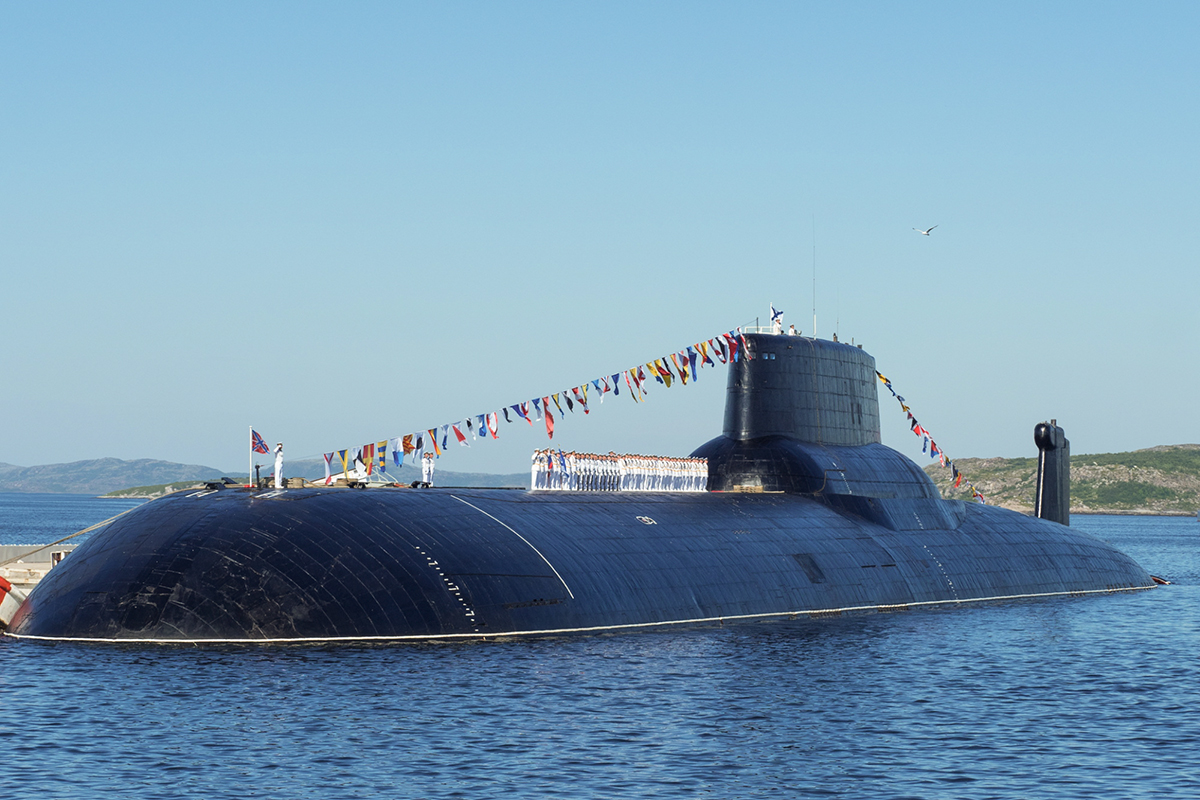
- Dmitry Donskoy in Kola Bay preparing for the Navy Day parade in 2018

History

→ Soviet Union → Russia
- Name: TK-208; Dmitry Donskoy (since 2002)
- Namesake: Dmitry Donskoy
- Builder: Sevmash
- Laid down: 30 June 1976
- Launched: 23 September 1980
- Commissioned: 29 December 1981
- In service: February 1982
- Out of service: 6 February 2023
- Status: Decommissioned, awaiting conversion to museum ship

General characteristics
- Class & type: Typhoon-class submarine
- Displacement: 23,200 t (22,800 long tons) surfaced; 48,000 t (47,000 long tons) submerged
- Length: 175 m (574 ft 2 in)
- Beam: 22.8 m (74 ft 10 in)
- Draft: 12.2 m (40 ft 0 in)
- Installed power: 2 × nuclear reactors
- Propulsion: 2 × steam turbines; 2 × shafts
- Speed: 16 kn (30 km/h; 18 mph) surfaced; 27 kn (50 km/h; 31 mph) submerged
- Test depth: 1,312 ft (400 m)
- Complement: 160 officers and sailors
- Armament: 20 × missile silos; 6 × 533 mm (21 in) torpedo tubes

Dmitry Donskoy (TK-208; Russian: Дми́трий Донско́й ТК-208) is a retired submarine that was the lead ship of the Project 941 Akula (NATO reporting name Typhoon) class of the Russian Navy and formerly the Soviet Navy. The boat was laid down at the Sevmash shipyard in Severodvinsk on 30 June 1976, launched on 23 September 1980, and commissioned on 29 December 1981, with the designation TK-208. It spent its entire career with the Northern Fleet after entering service in February 1982, and received the name Dmitry Donskoy in July 2002.

Dmitry Donskoy was designed to operate in the Arctic Ocean and carry R-39 submarine-launched ballistic missiles, with each of them capable of holding several nuclear warheads. The R-39 was larger than any previous Soviet SLBM and required a new submarine design. The Typhoon class became the largest submarines ever built. As part of the country's nuclear deterrent, their main armament consisted of twenty missile silos. During the 1980s TK-208 conducted several training exercises in the Arctic that involved breaking through ice and launching its missiles.

The submarine underwent modernization at the Sevmash shipyard starting from 1990, but due to delays caused by the fall of the Soviet Union, the refit was not completed until 2002. It was upgraded to carry and test the RSM-56 Bulava SLBMs, which replaced the R-39 in the Russian Navy. Dmitry Donskoy was used as a weapons testing platform for the main tests of the new Bulava missile and served in that role from 2003 to 2010. After that, it was used for ceremonial events and assisting the sea trials of newer submarines, including those of the Borei class and Yasen class. Dmitry Donskoy finished its last known assignment in September 2022.

The submarine was decommissioned on 6 February 2023 and was left docked at Severodvinsk. Dmitry Donskoy had been the last Typhoon submarine on active service since 2004, making it the largest active submarine in the world by displacement. After its decommissioning there was a lobbying effort by veterans' groups for the Russian government to preserve it as a museum. In March 2025 it was announced that plans are being made to convert Dmitry Donskoy into a museum ship and put it on display at the Peter the Great Central Naval Museum in Saint Petersburg.

== Design and construction ==
Work on the third generation of Soviet nuclear-powered submarines was accelerated in response to the development of the Trident submarine-launched ballistic missile (SLBM) by the United States. At their summit meeting in November 1974 in Vladivostok, Soviet General Secretary Leonid Brezhnev told U.S. President Gerald Ford that the Soviet Union would build a new strategic missile submarine if the U.S. continued its development of the Trident. Brezhnev reportedly used the word typhoon ("тайфун") to refer to the new submarine, which later became its NATO code-name. It was a counter to the Ohio-class submarine of the United States Navy, which was built to carry Trident nuclear missiles. The Project 941 Akula (Russian: Акула, lit. 'shark', NATO reporting name: Typhoon class) was designed by the engineer Sergey Kovalyov at the Rubin Design Bureau, which began developing it in 1972. The R-39 missile that the submarine would carry was being worked on at the same time.

The Typhoon class has a unique design that uses two main pressure hulls, one on each side of the submarine, instead of a single pressure hull. The living quarters for the crew, the propulsion machinery, and other equipment are located in them. Each of the main pressure hulls is divided into eight compartments, and has a length of 149 metres (488 ft 10 in) and a diameter of 7.2 metres (23 ft 7 in). The starboard hull includes a recreation area for the crew consisting of a gym, a swimming pool, a sauna, and an aviary. Twenty missile silos are placed in between the main pressure hulls, in front of the sail. In total the submarine has five pressure hulls: its control room is located in a pressure hull directly below the sail, between the two main hulls; a fourth hull contains the torpedo tubes and is located on the bow; and a fifth is located behind the control room and connects the two main hulls. There is an escape chamber above each of the main hulls, allowing for the entire crew of 160 officers and sailors to be taken to the surface.

Dmitry Donskoy and the other vessels of its class are the largest submarines ever built. It has a displacement of 23,200 tonnes (22,800 long tons) while surfaced and 48,000 tonnes (47,000 long tons) while submerged. It also has a large reserve buoyancy of 48%, meaning that almost half of its submerged displacement is water in its ballast tanks, which contributes to its ability to break through ice while surfacing. The submarine has a length of 175 metres (574 ft 2 in), a beam of 22.8 metres (74 ft 10 in), and a draft of 12.2 metres (40 ft 0 in). Its power source are two OK-650 nuclear reactors, one in each main hull, and propulsion is provided by two steam turbines, producing 50,000 horsepower (37,000 kW) for each of the two propeller shafts. It also has a diesel generator. The propellers are both covered by shrouds to prevent damage from ice when it surfaces. It has a speed of up to 16 kn (30 km/h; 18 mph) while surfaced and 27 kn (50 km/h; 31 mph) while submerged. During the Soviet era, the submarine carried 20 R-39 SLBMs, with up to 200 nuclear warheads in total. Each missile weighed 90 tons and had a range of 8,300 kilometres (5,200 mi). Its armament also includes six 533 mm (21.0 in) torpedo tubes, which can hold regular torpedoes or anti-submarine missiles. The submarine's test depth is 1,312 ft (400 m).

The twin-hull design of the Typhoon class was necessary for it to carry R-39 missiles. They were much larger than previous Soviet SLBMs and required large missile tubes that a single pressure hull design could not accommodate. It was also the first Soviet submarine designed to operate in the Arctic. The Sevmash shipyard at Severodvinsk was expanded with an additional building hall specifically for the Typhoon class, which is the largest covered shipway in the world. TK-208 (Note: ТК stands for "Тяжелый Крейсер" in Russian, meaning "heavy cruiser".) was laid down on 30 June 1976, launched on 23 September 1980, and commissioned on 29 December 1981. It is the lead ship of its class.

== Service history ==
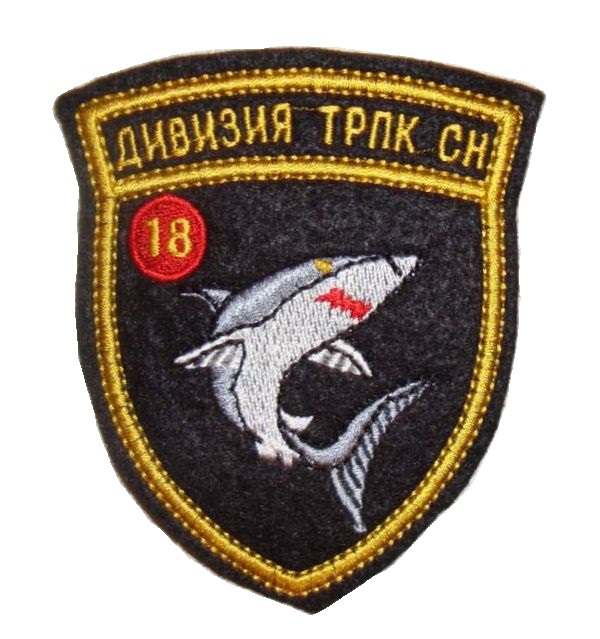
Dmitry Donskoy and all boats of its class were in the 18th Submarine Division

TK-208 entered service with the Northern Fleet in February 1982. It became part of the 18th Submarine Division, which also included all six boats of the Typhoon class from 1989 and was stationed at the Zapadnaya Litsa naval base in the Kola Peninsula. The submarines' mission was to go on long patrols in the Arctic Ocean as part of the Soviet Union's nuclear deterrent. During its second patrol, lasting from December 1983 until April 1984, TK-208 spent 121 days submerged, a world record at the time. The boat's commanding officer, Captain 1st rank Aleksandr Olkhovikov, was awarded the title Hero of the Soviet Union after the mission. In 1983 and 1985 the submarine practiced breaking through ice at the North Pole to launch missiles, including ice that was almost 3 metres (9 ft 10 in) thick. In 1987 TK-208 was added to the Soviet Navy's Roll of Honor and in 1989 it was recognized by the Ministry of Defense for its service. TK-208 returned to the Sevmash shipyard at Severodvinsk in October 1990 for the refueling of its reactors and modification to be able to carry the newer R-39M missile that was under development. Work was delayed after the fall of the Soviet Union because of budget problems, and resumed in 1996.

During the 1990s three boats of the Typhoon class were taken out of service, and in January 2000 it was reported that the other three―TK-208, TK-17 (later renamed Arkhangelsk), and TK-20 (later renamed Severstal)— would be modernized to remain in service at least until 2010–2012. The Russian Navy wanted to use them to test new missiles and to maintain its strategic submarine force at a certain level. TK-208 was fitted to carry the newer RSM-56 Bulava missile, which replaced the unsuccessful R-39M. It is unclear if all or only some of its missile launch tubes were upgraded to carry the Bulava missile. The boat returned to service on 26 July 2002. After its modernization was complete, TK-208 was given the name Dmitry Donskoy, after the 14th-century Prince of Moscow Dmitry Donskoy. The renaming was part of the Russian government's effort to restore historic links with the pre-Soviet history of Russia. It was the only boat of its class to undergo modernization, and the other two were placed in reserve in 2004.

Upon returning to service, Dmitry Donskoy was used as a weapons testing platform for the new RSM-56 Bulava missile. The first "throw" test on the submarine was carried out on 11 December 2003, when it successfully ejected a Bulava missile while surfaced, and it reached the height at which its engines would activate. A second test, while the submarine was submerged, occurred on 23 September 2004. The first flight test was carried out successfully 27 September 2005. Dmitry Donskoy, while submerged in the White Sea, launched a Bulava missile at the Kura Missile Test Range in the Kamchatka Peninsula, about 5,500 kilometers away. Another flight test took place on 21 December 2005. It had been scheduled for 13 December, but due to a technical problem it had to be postponed. Two more tests were carried out in 2006, on 7 September and 24 December, with both of them failing because of problems with the missile. The submarine was unaffected by the missile test failures. After further work on the Bulava missile, Dmitry Donskoy carried out a successful launch tests on 28 June 2007 and 18 September 2008.

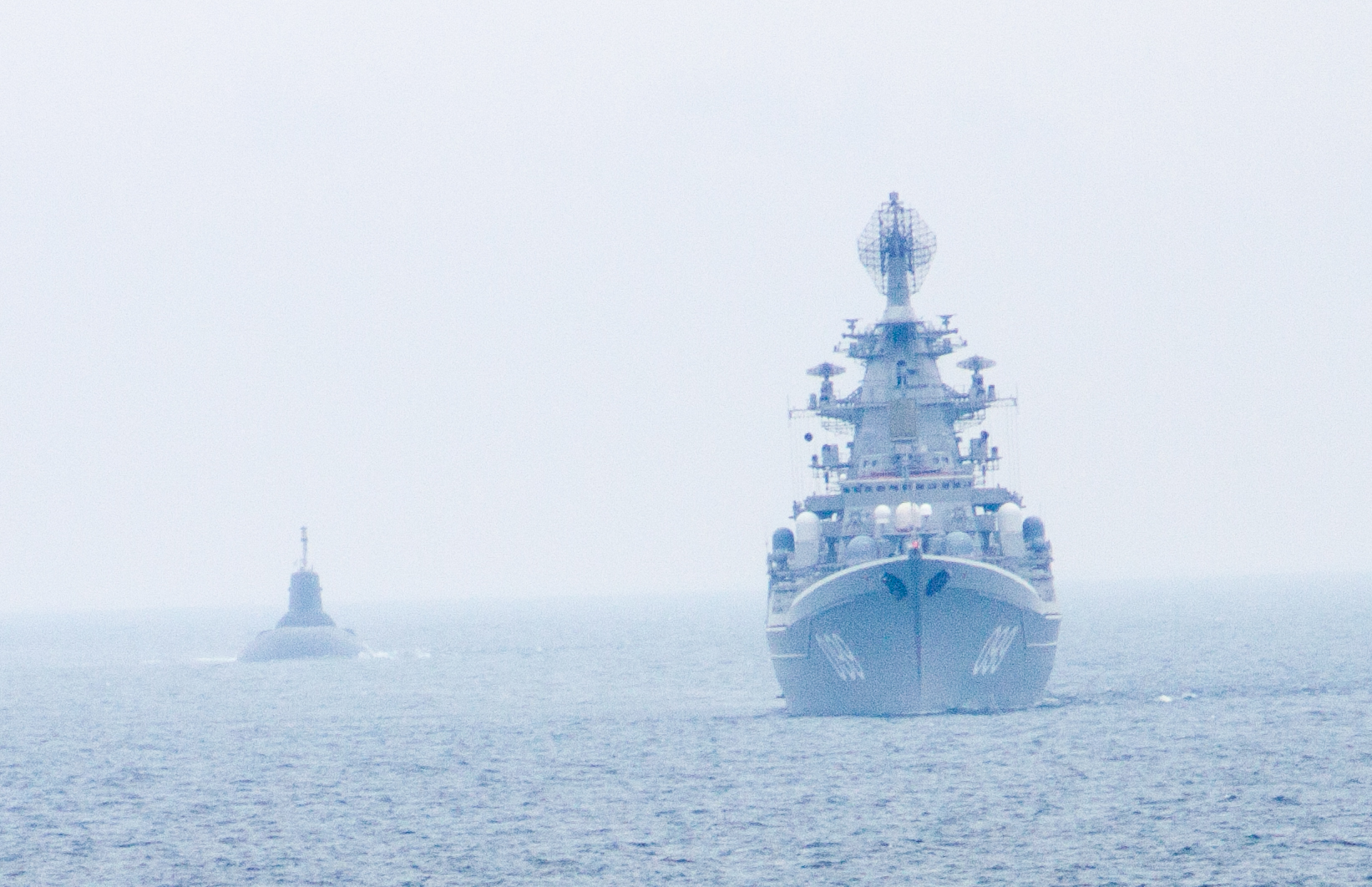
Dmitry Donskoy with the Russian battlecruiser Pyotr Veliky in 2017

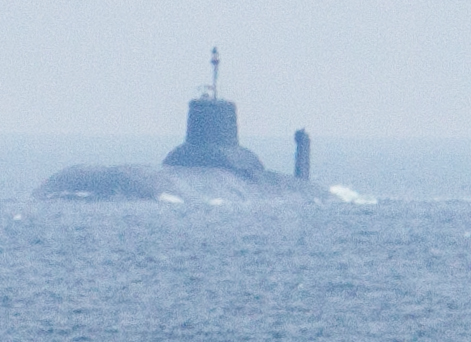
Dmitry Donskoy in the Baltic Sea in 2017

The submarine underwent a refit during 2008. Dmitry Donskoy was visited by Patriarch Kirill of the Russian Orthodox Church on 22 August 2009. An unsuccessful missile test was carried out on 9 December of that year and caused the 2009 Norwegian spiral anomaly, when a missile that went off its trajectory caused a light pattern in the sky that was seen by people in northern Norway. The Russian Ministry of Defense stated the next day that the lights were caused by a failed missile launch from Dmitry Donskoy.

Dmitry Donskoy had been used for the main testing of the RSM-56 Bulava missile, performing a total of ten launches. After 2010, the responsibility for continued testing of the missile was given to the newer Borei-class submarines, starting with Yury Dolgorukiy. From that point Dmitry Donskoy was used for assisting the sea trials of other ships and for ceremonial events. In 2017 it took part in the Navy Day parade at Saint Petersburg, along with ten other Northern Fleet ships, including the battlecruiser Pyotr Veliky. During its journey it had to pass through the Great Belt strait between the Danish islands of Zeeland and Funen, the only area there deep enough for the submarine, and remained on the surface while in the shallow Baltic Sea. In 2018 Dmitry Donskoy begin another refit, and in June 2019 the submarine successfully performed tests after the refit was finished. By 2019, it had participated in the sea trials of the Borei-class submarine Knyaz Vladimir and the Yasen-class submarine Kazan. The other two boats of the Typhoon class, Arkhangelsk and Severstal, were decommissioned, leaving Dmitry Donskoy the only one still in active service by 2019.

It continued to serve in its role of assisting with the testing of new submarines from the Sevmash shipyard, and in 2021 had one of its busiest years, spending 131 days at sea. That year it was also reported that the entire Typhoon class will be replaced by the newer Borei class, but Dmitry Donskoy would remain in service until 2026. A boat of the Borei class will receive the name of Dmitry Donskoy after the submarine is decommissioned. From 2017 to 2022, Dmitry Donskoy had traveled a total of 56,000 nautical miles. As of August 2022, over the course of its entire career, it had traveled a total of 110,000 nautical miles, and it never experienced any accidents while at sea. In July 2022 it was reported that the submarine had been decommissioned, but it was later clarified that the decision on its decommissioning would be made by the end of 2022. The last known assignment of Dmitry Donskoy was taking part in the sea trials of the Yasen-class submarine Krasnoyarsk and the Borei-class Generalissimus Suvorov in September 2022.

== Proposed conversion ==
Dmitry Donskoy was decommissioned by the Russian Navy on 6 February 2023 after over four decades of service and was moved to the Severodvinsk naval base, where it was docked together with its sister ships Arkhangelsk and Severstal. Prior to that it had been the largest active submarine in the world by displacement. (Note: The Typhoon class remains the largest submarine by displacement and used to be the largest by length until Belgorod entered service in 2022.) A technical crew remains onboard to oversee basic maintenance. On 19 March 2023, which is Submariners' Day in Russia, the All-Russian Public Organization "Veterans of Russia" appealed to the Russian government and the company Rosatom to not scrap the submarine. They were later joined in their lobbying by other veterans' groups, including the All-Russian Movement to Support the Navy and the Admirals' Club, the latter led by a former commander-in-chief of the Russian Navy, Admiral of the Fleet Vladimir Kuroyedov. Kuroyedov lobbied directly to Russian President Vladimir Putin. Such proposals had also been made by veterans' groups and other organizations before it was decommissioned.

On 19 March 2025 it was announced that Dmitry Donskoy will be turned into a museum ship and moored at the Peter the Great Central Naval Museum in Saint Petersburg. An order had been issued by the Russian government to the Ministry of Defense, Rosatom, the United Shipbuilding Corporation, and the city government in Saint Petersburg to begin planning the conversion of Dmitry Donskoy. Around that time a group of specialists visited the submarine to examine the state of it. The process of conversion will require the removal of the spent nuclear fuel from its reactors, and then cutting out and removing the reactor compartments, which can take years. It has been estimated that the total cost will be in the tens of billions of rubles. If the project is completed, Dmitry Donskoy will become the second Russian nuclear submarine to be turned into a museum ship after the K-3 Leninsky Komsomol.

== Sources ==
=== Books ===
- Gardiner, Robert & Chumbley, Stephen, eds. (1995). Conway's All the World's Fighting Ships 1947–1995. London: Conway Maritime Press. ISBN 1-55750-132-7.
- Polmar, Norman; Moore, K. J. (2003). Cold War Submarines: The Design and Construction of U.S. and Soviet Submarines, 1945–2001. Dulles, Virginia: Potomac Books Inc. ISBN 1-57488-594-4.
- Polmar, Norman; Noot, Jurrien (1991). Submarines of the Russian and Soviet Navies, 1718–1990. Annapolis, Maryland: Naval Institute Press. ISBN 0-87021-570-1.

=== Websites ===
- "After 42 years, big N-sub withdrawn". Australian Naval Institute. 12 February 2023.
- Azanov, Roman (15 August 2019). ""Одна подлодка контролирует полмира"" [One submarine controls half the world]. TASS (in Russian).
- Azanov, Roman (27 March 2021). "Топ-5 самых известных атомных подлодок "Севмаша", которые всплывали во льдах Арктики" [Top 5 most famous nuclear submarine of "Sevmash", that surfaced in Arctic ice]. TASS (in Russian).
- Cole, Brendan (6 February 2023). "Russia Loses World's Largest Nuclear Submarine". Newsweek.
- "Dmitry Donskoy submarine not to be decommissioned for five years at least, says source". TASS. 14 January 2021.
- Friedman, Norman (February 1999). "World Naval Developments: The Typhoon Saga Ends". Proceedings of the U.S. Naval Institute.
- Humphries, Conor; Solovyov, Dmitry (10 December 2009). "Russian nuclear missile test fails, visible in Norway". Reuters.
- Koryakin, Oleg (25 June 2019). "Возвращение гиганта: в США заинтересовались ремонтом "Дмитрия Донского"" [Return of the giant: the USA is interested in refit of "Dmitry Donskoy"] (in Russian).
- Kozachenko, Aleksey (20 July 2022). "Почему самая большая в мире АПЛ «Дмитрий Донской» выведена из состава ВМФ?" [Why was the largest nuclear submarine in the world "Dmitry Donskoy" decommissioned?]. Argumenty i Fakty (in Russian).
- Moskowitz, Clara (10 December 2009). "Russia admits missile caused UFO lights". NBC News.
- Nilsen, Thomas (1 August 2017). "Typhoon and nuclear battle cruiser make ready for northbound voyage". The Barents Observer.
- Nilsen, Thomas (13 September 2022). "Russia tests latest underwater warfare technology in Barents Sea". The Barents Observer.
- Nilsen, Thomas (21 March 2025). ""Now this pile of scrap metal will be a monument to the USSR"". The Barents Observer.
- Pike, John (25 August 2000). "941 TYPHOON - Russian and Soviet Nuclear Forces". Federation of American Scientists.
- "Russia's nuclear-powered sub Dmitry Donskoy withdrawn from service". TASS. 6 February 2023.
- Staalesen, Atle (18 July 2017). "Now we set course for the Baltic Sea, says Northern Fleet". The Barents Observer.
- Sutton, H. I. (23 August 2020). "Last Typhoon: Can The World's Largest Submarine Still Destroy The World?". Forbes.
- Trevithick, Joseph (7 February 2023). "Russia's Last Giant Typhoon Class Submarine's Fate May Finally Be Sealed". The War Zone.
- Valagin, Anton (20 June 2019). "Северный флот испытал гигантскую подлодку" [Northern Fleet tested giant submarine]. Rossiyskaya Gazeta (in Russian).
- Weichert, Brandon J. (20 March 2025). "Russia's Typhoon-class Submarine Is Now a Museum". The National Interest.
- Yemelyanenkov, Aleksandr (28 August 2008). "Атомоход "Дмитрий Донской" готов к новым испытаниям ракетного комплекса "Булава"" [Nuclear submarine "Dmitry Donskoy" read for new "Bulava" missile tests]. Rossiyskaya Gazeta (in Russian).
- Yemelyanenkov, Aleksandr (25 September 2008). "Запуск "Булавы" вызвал всплеск противоречивых комментариев" ["Bulava" launch sparks controversy]. Rossiyskaya Gazeta (in Russian).
- Yemelyanenkov, Aleksandr (28 December 2021). "Подводный крейсер особого назначения: "Дмитрий Донской" еще послужит флоту" [Special purpose underwater cruiser: "Dmitry Donskoy" will still serve the fleet]. Rossiyskaya Gazeta (in Russian).
- Yemelyanenkov, Aleksandr (19 March 2025). "Самый большой в мире подводный ракетоносец "Дмитрий Донской" превратят в музей" [Largest in the world submarine "Dmitry Donskoy" will be turned into a museum]. Rossiyskaya Gazeta (in Russian).
- "Атомная подлодка "Дмитрий Донской" станет частью музея на Балтике" [Nuclear submarine "Dmitry Donskoy" will become part of Baltic Sea museum]. TASS (in Russian). 19 March 2025.
- "Источник: самую большую в мире АПЛ "Дмитрий Донской" вывели из состава ВМФ" [Source: the world's largest nuclear submarine "Dmitry Donskoy" has been decommissioned from the Navy]. RIA Novosti (in Russian). 20 July 2022.
- "Командир атомной подлодки Олег Цыбин: "Дмитрий Донской" на 100% отдал свой долг Родине" [Nuclear submarine commander Oleg Tsybin: "Dmitry Donskoy" has 100% fulfilled its duty to the Motherland]. Zen News (in Russian). 13 December 2022.
- "Патриарх Кирилл посетил ракетный крейсер "Дмитрий Донской"" [Patriarch Kirill visits missile cruiser "Dmitry Donskoy"]. Interfax (in Russian). 22 August 2009.
- "Стратегическая АПЛ "Дмитрий Донской" готовится к выводу из состава ВМФ России" [Nuclear submarine "Dmitry Donskoy" preparing for decommissioning from the Russian Navy]. TASS (in Russian). 10 December 2022.
