= Russian submarine Arkhangelsk (TK-17) =

Russian submarine

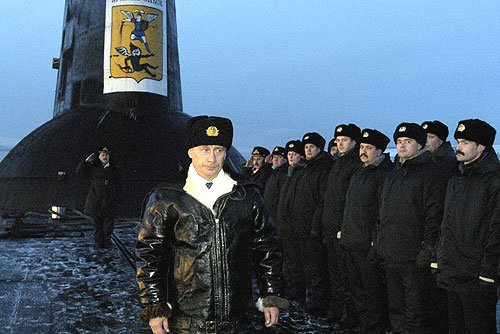
- President Vladimir Putin on Arkhangelsk in 2004

History

→ Soviet Union → Russia
- Name: TK-17; Arkhangelsk (since 2002)
- Namesake: Arkhangelsk
- Builder: Sevmash
- Laid down: 24 February 1985
- Launched: August 1986
- Commissioned: December 1987
- Out of service: In reserve, April 2004
- Status: Decommissioned, awaiting dismantling

General characteristics
- Class & type: Typhoon-class submarine
- Displacement: 23,200 t (22,800 long tons) surfaced; 48,000 t (47,000 long tons) submerged
- Length: 175 m (574 ft 2 in)
- Beam: 22.8 m (74 ft 10 in)
- Draft: 12.2 m (40 ft 0 in)
- Installed power: 2 × nuclear reactors
- Propulsion: 2 × steam turbines; 2 × shafts
- Speed: 16 kn (30 km/h; 18 mph) surfaced; 27 kn (50 km/h; 31 mph) submerged
- Test depth: 1,312 ft (400 m)
- Complement: 160 officers and sailors
- Armament: 20 × missile silos; 6 × 533 mm (21 in) torpedo tubes

Arkhangelsk (TK-17; Russian: ́Архангельск ТК-17) is a retired submarine of the Project 941 Akula (NATO reporting name Typhoon) class of the Russian Navy and formerly the Soviet Navy. The boat was laid down on 24 February 1985, launched in August 1986, and commissioned in December 1987, with the designation TK-17. It spent its entire career in the Northern Fleet, and received the name Arkhangelsk in December 2002.

Arkhangelsk was designed to operate in the Arctic Ocean and to carry R-39 submarine-launched ballistic missiles, with each of them capable of holding several nuclear warheads. Part of the country's nuclear deterrent, its main armament consisted of twenty missile silos. Arkhangelsk and the other boats of its class are the largest submarines in the world by displacement.

During a training exercise in September 1991, a missile exploded inside one of the silos of the submarine, causing a fire to break out. Its captain had the boat dive so that the seawater would put out the resulting fire. After the incident the submarine was repaired and remained in service until the R-39 missile was phased out. Its last known assignment occurred in February 2004. In April 2004 Arkhangelsk was laid up and placed in the reserve. Since then it has remained docked in Severodvinsk, next to its sister ship Severstal. Despite some reports that they could be modernized and restored to active service, by March 2015 they had been decommissioned, and as of 2019 they are waiting to be scrapped.

== Design and construction ==
Work on the third generation of Soviet nuclear-powered submarines was accelerated in response to the development of the Trident submarine-launched ballistic missile (SLBM) by the United States. At their summit meeting in November 1974 in Vladivostok, Soviet general secretary Leonid Brezhnev told U.S. president Gerald Ford that the Soviet Union would build a new strategic missile submarine if the U.S. continued its development of the Trident. Brezhnev reportedly used the word typhoon ("тайфун") to refer to the new submarine, which later became its NATO code-name. It was a counter to the Ohio-class submarine of the United States Navy, which was built to carry Trident nuclear missiles. The Project 941 Akula (Russian: Акула, lit. 'shark', NATO reporting name: Typhoon-class) was designed by the engineer Sergey Kovalyov at the Rubin Design Bureau, which began developing it in 1972. The R-39 missile that the submarine would carry was being worked on at the same time.

The Typhoon-class has a unique design that uses two main pressure hulls, one on each side of the submarine, instead of a single pressure hull. The living quarters for the crew, the propulsion machinery, and other equipment are located in them. Each of the main pressure hulls is divided into eight compartments, and has a length of 149 metres (488 ft 10 in) and a diameter of 7.2 metres (23 ft 7 in). The starboard hull includes a recreation area for the crew consisting of a gym, a swimming pool, a sauna, and an aviary. Twenty missile silos are placed in between the main pressure hulls, in front of the sail. In total the submarine has five pressure hulls: its control room is located in a pressure hull directly below the sail, between the two main hulls; a fourth hull contains the torpedo tubes and is located on the bow; and a fifth is located behind the control room and connects the two main hulls. There is an escape chamber above each of the main hulls, allowing for the entire crew of 160 officers and sailors to be taken to the surface.

Arkhangelsk and the other vessels of its class are the largest submarines ever built. It has a displacement of 23,200 tonnes (22,800 long tons) while surfaced and 48,000 tonnes (47,000 long tons) while submerged. It also has a large reserve buoyancy of 48%, meaning that almost half of its submerged displacement is water in its ballast tanks, which contributes to its ability to break through ice while surfacing. The submarine has a length of 175 metres (574 ft 2 in), a beam of 22.8 metres (74 ft 10 in), and a draft of 12.2 metres (40 ft 0 in). Its power source are two OK-650 nuclear reactors, one in each main hull, and propulsion is provided by two steam turbines, producing 50,000 horsepower (37,000 kW) for each of the two propeller shafts. It also has a diesel generator. The propellers are both covered by shrouds to prevent damage from ice when it surfaces. It has a speed of up to 16 kn (30 km/h; 18 mph) while surfaced and 27 kn (50 km/h; 31 mph) while submerged. The submarine carried 20 R-39 SLBMs, with up to 200 nuclear warheads in total. Each missile weighed 90 tons and had a range of 8,300 kilometres (5,200 mi). Its armament also includes six 533 mm (21.0 in) torpedo tubes, which can hold regular torpedoes or anti-submarine missiles. The submarine's test depth is 1,312 ft (400 m).

The twin-hull design of the Typhoon class was necessary for it to carry R-39 missiles. It was much larger than previous Soviet SLBMs and required large missile tubes that a single pressure hull design could not accommodate. It was also the first Soviet submarine designed to operate in the Arctic. The Sevmash shipyard at Severodvinsk was expanded with an additional building hall specifically for the Typhoon class, which is the largest covered shipway in the world. TK-17 (Note: ТК stands for "Тяжелый Крейсер" in Russian, meaning "heavy cruiser".) was laid down on 24 February 1985, launched in August 1986, and commissioned in December 1987, becoming the fifth vessel of its class.

== History ==
The emblem on the sail of the submarine is the coat of arms of Arkhangelsk

TK-17 entered service in the Northern Fleet of the Soviet Navy and was part of the 18th Submarine Division, which included all six boats of the Typhoon class from 1989. The division was stationed at the Zapadnaya Litsa naval base in the Kola Peninsula. The purpose of the submarines was to go on long patrols in the Arctic Ocean as part of the Soviet Union's nuclear deterrent.

On 27 September 1991 TK-17 was submerged in the White Sea for a test missile launch at a target in the Soviet Far East, when the missile exploded inside the silo seconds before it was supposed to be fired. Captain 1st rank Igor Grishkov, the commanding officer, ordered an emergency surfacing. A fire broke out inside the silo and other areas around it on the deck, caused by the missile's solid propellant, which had also leaked out onto the rubber covering of the outer hull. He ordered the crew in the missile compartment to prepare for flooding and had the submarine dive, to use seawater to put out the fire before it could spread to any of the other nineteen missiles on board. It is unknown how many nuclear warheads were on the other missiles. The maneuver was successful, and when TK-17 returned to the surface the fire had been extinguished. There were no casualties among the crew. The submarine traveled to the Severodvinsk shipyard, where the damage was repaired, and later returned to service, though that missile silo was never used again.

The incident was kept secret by the Russian Navy for many years, before being publicized by a regional newspaper in Arkhangelsk in 2014. Since then other Russian media sources have also reported on the incident. Igor Grishkov has been credited in the media with preventing a potential nuclear disaster. The Supreme Soviet of Russia considered him as a candidate for the award Hero of the Soviet Union, but ultimately did not give him the title.

During the 1990s three of the six boats of the Typhoon class were decommissioned, leaving TK-17, TK-208 (later renamed Dmitry Donskoy), and TK-20 (later renamed Severstal) in active service. In December 1998 the United States announced it will assist Russia in scrapping all six of the Typhoon-class submarines, but in January 2000 it was reported that three boats will remain in service to test new missiles and maintain the Navy's strategic force structure. In December 2002, by an order of the commander-in-chief of the Russian Navy, TK-17 was given the name Arkhangelsk, after the city. There was some indication that Arkhangelsk and Severstal would undergo modernization to carry a new ballistic missile design, just as Dmitry Donskoy had received around that time, and would stay in active service until 2010–2012.

From 2001 to 2002 Arkhangelsk underwent a refit at the Sevmash shipyard, returning to its base at Zapadnaya Litsa on 9 November 2002. The phasing out of the R-39 missile, which the submarine was built to carry, occurred in the early 2000s, with the last launches of the missile taking place in the fall of 2003 from Arkhangelsk and Dmitry Donskoy. In February 2004, Arkhangelsk was visited by Russian president Vladimir Putin, who observed naval exercises from the submarine.

Arkhangelsk was laid up in late April 2004 and placed in the reserve, along with Severstal. Since then both vessels have been docked in Severodvinsk. There is still a technical crew onboard to oversee its basic maintenance. On 7 October 2007, the officers of Arkhangelsk were invited to Vladimir Putin's 55th birthday celebration. In December 2007 the crew and the local government celebrated the 20th anniversary of the submarine being commissioned. It was reported in 2010 that the Typhoon-class submarines would remain in the Navy until 2019, but in May 2013 sources in the Russian Ministry of Defense told the media that Arkhangelsk and Severstal will be decommissioned and scrapped within six years, citing the high financial cost of modernizing them. In March 2015, the head of the Rubin Design Bureau said that both submarines had been decommissioned and will be scrapped at some future date. However, in November 2016 a spokesman of the United Shipbuilding Corporation said that a final decision has not been made yet. In January 2018 a source in Rosatom said that the company will dismantle the decommissioned Arkhangelsk and Severstal after 2020. Also that year, the covers of the missile silos were permanently removed so that the U.S. can see by satellite that they are not carrying missiles. As of 2019 they were waiting to be scrapped, according to the head of the Sevmash shipyard.

== Sources ==
=== Books ===
- Gardiner, Robert & Chumbley, Stephen, eds. (1995). Conway's All the World's Fighting Ships 1947–1995. London: Conway Maritime Press. ISBN 1-55750-132-7.
- Polmar, Norman & Noot, Jurrien (1991). Submarines of the Russian and Soviet Navies, 1718–1990. Annapolis, Maryland: Naval Institute Press. ISBN 0-87021-570-1.
- Polmar, Norman; Moore, K. J. (2003). Cold War Submarines: The Design and Construction of U.S. and Soviet Submarines, 1945–2001. Dulles, Virginia: Potomac Books Inc. ISBN 1-57488-594-4.

=== Websites ===
- Azanov, Roman (15 August 2019). ""Одна подлодка контролирует полмира"" [One submarine controls half the world]. TASS (in Russian).
- Cole, Brendan (6 February 2023). "Russia Loses World's Largest Nuclear Submarine". Newsweek.
- Friedman, Norman (February 1999). "World Naval Developments: The Typhoon Saga Ends". Proceedings of the U.S. Naval Institute.
- Galitskikh, Oleg (28 September 2021). "Проверка на прочность: к чему привел взрыв ракеты в шахте подлодки ТК-17" [Test of strength: what happened after the missile explosion in the TK-17 submarine silo]. Rossiyskaya Gazeta (in Russian).
- Kozachenko, Aleksey (20 July 2022). "Почему самая большая в мире АПЛ «Дмитрий Донской» выведена из состава ВМФ?" [Why was the largest nuclear submarine in the world "Dmitry Donskoy" decommissioned?]. Argumenty i Fakty (in Russian).
- Kudrik, Igor (13 November 2002). "Typhoons being repaired to operate until 2010". Bellona Foundation.
- Mikhailov, Andrey (4 December 2007). "Подводному ракетоносцу «Архангельск» исполнилось 20 лет" [Nuclear submarine Arkhangelsk marks 20 years]. Pravda.ru (in Russian).
- Nilsen, Thomas (3 February 2018). "Captain who saved White Sea from nuclear disaster dies at 67". The Barents Observer.
- Pike, John (25 August 2000). "941 TYPHOON - Russian and Soviet Nuclear Forces". Federation of American Scientists.
- Weichert, Brandon J. (20 March 2025). "Russia's Typhoon-class Submarine Is Now a Museum". The National Interest.
- Yemelyanenkov, Aleksandr (28 December 2021). "Подводный крейсер особого назначения: "Дмитрий Донской" еще послужит флоту" [Special purpose underwater cruiser: "Dmitry Donskoy" will still serve the fleet]. Rossiyskaya Gazeta (in Russian).
- "АПЛ проекта 941 "Северсталь" и "Архангельск" будут утилизированы" [Project 941 submarines "Severstal" and "Arkhangelsk" will be scrapped]. TASS. 18 March 2015.
- "Две АПЛ класса "Акула" пустят на металлолом на 6 лет раньше срока" [Two Akula-class submarines will be scrapped 6 years earlier than planned]. RBK Group (in Russian). 21 May 2013.
- "Командир атомной подлодки Олег Цыбин: "Дмитрий Донской" на 100% отдал свой долг Родине" [Nuclear submarine commander Oleg Tsybin: "Dmitry Donskoy" has 100% fulfilled its duty to the Motherland]. Zen News (in Russian). 13 December 2022.
- "Решение об утилизации самых больших в мире АПЛ "Акула" пока не принято" [Decision on scrapping the largest in the world Akula-class submarines not made yet]. RIA Novosti (in Russian). 11 November 2016.
- "Россия утилизирует две крупнейшие в мире подлодки, сообщил источник" [Russia will scrap two of the world's largest submarines, source says]. RIA Novosti (in Russian). 19 January 2018.
