= Soviet submarine TK-202 =

1982 Typhoon-class submarine

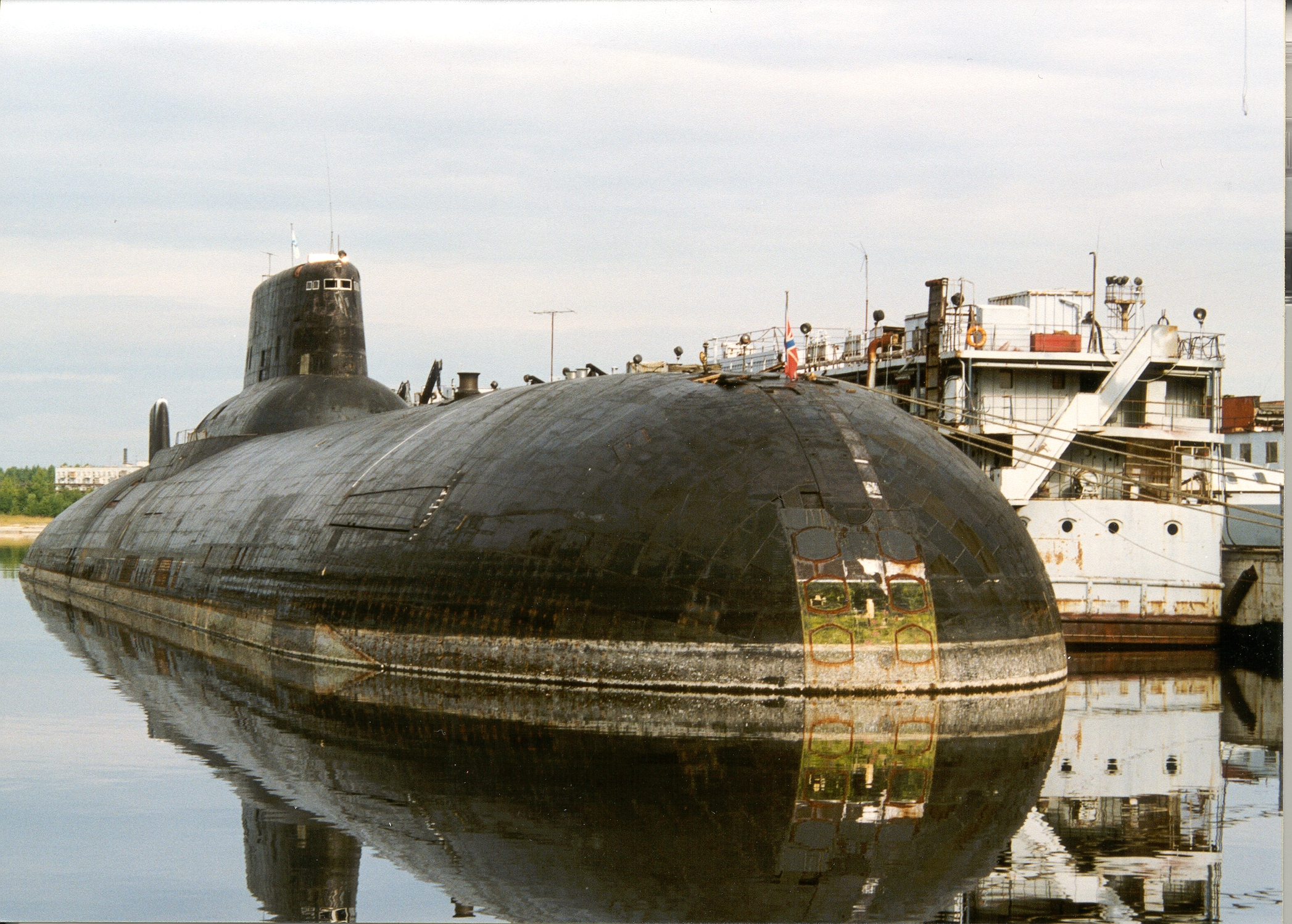
- TK-202 in 1999

History

→ Soviet Union → Russia
- Name: TK-202
- Builder: Sevmash
- Laid down: 1 October 1980
- Launched: 26 April 1982
- Commissioned: 28 December 1983
- Out of service: 1996
- Stricken: July 1999
- Fate: Scrapped from 2005 to 2009

General characteristics
- Class & type: Typhoon-class submarine
- Displacement: 23,200 t (22,800 long tons) surfaced; 48,000 t (47,000 long tons) submerged
- Length: 175 m (574 ft 2 in)
- Beam: 22.8 m (74 ft 10 in)
- Draft: 12.2 m (40 ft 0 in)
- Installed power: 2 × nuclear reactors
- Propulsion: 2 × steam turbines; 2 × shafts
- Speed: 16 kn (30 km/h; 18 mph) surfaced; 27 kn (50 km/h; 31 mph) submerged
- Test depth: 1,312 ft (400 m)
- Complement: 160 officers and sailors
- Armament: 20 × missile silos; 6 × 533 mm (21 in) torpedo tubes

TK-202 was a submarine of the Project 941 Akula (NATO reporting name Typhoon) class of the Russian Navy and previously the Soviet Navy. The boat was laid down on 1 October 1980, launched 26 April 1982, and commissioned on 28 December 1983. It spent its entire career in the Northern Fleet before being placed into the reserve in 1996.

TK-202 was designed to operate in the Arctic Ocean and carry R-39 submarine-launched ballistic missiles, with each of them capable of holding several nuclear warheads. As part of the country's nuclear deterrent, its main armament consisted of twenty missile tubes. After more than a decade of service, in July 1999 it was decommissioned and began the process of dismantling. TK-202 was scrapped between 2005 and 2009.

== Design and construction ==
Work on the third generation of Soviet nuclear-powered submarines was accelerated in response to the development of the Trident submarine-launched ballistic missile (SLBM) by the United States. At their summit meeting in November 1974 in Vladivostok, Soviet General Secretary Leonid Brezhnev told U.S. President Gerald Ford that the Soviet Union would build a new strategic missile submarine if the U.S. continued its development of the Trident. Brezhnev reportedly used the word typhoon ("тайфун") to refer to the new submarine, which later became its NATO code name. It became a counter to the Ohio-class submarine of the United States Navy, which was built to carry Trident nuclear missiles. The Project 941 Akula (Russian: Акула, lit. 'shark', NATO reporting name: Typhoon class) was designed by the engineer Sergey Kovalyov at the Rubin Design Bureau, which began developing it in 1972. The R-39 missile that the submarine would carry was being worked on at the same time.

The Typhoon class has a unique design that uses two main pressure hulls, one on each side of the submarine, instead of a single pressure hull. The living quarters for the crew, the propulsion machinery, and other equipment were located in them. Each of the main pressure hulls was divided into eight compartments, and had a length of 149 metres (488 ft 10 in) and a diameter of 7.2 metres (23 ft 7 in). The starboard hull included a recreation area for the crew consisting of a gym, a swimming pool, a sauna, and an aviary. Twenty missile silos were placed in between the main pressure hulls, in front of the sail. In total the submarine had five pressure hulls: its control room was located in a pressure hull directly below the sail, between the two main hulls; a fourth hull contains the torpedo tubes and was located on the bow; and a fifth was located behind the control room and connects the two main hulls. There was an escape chamber above each of the main hulls, allowing for the entire crew of 160 officers and sailors to be taken to the surface.

TK-202 and the other vessels of its class are the largest submarines ever built. It had a displacement of 23,200 tonnes (22,800 long tons) while surfaced and 48,000 tonnes (47,000 long tons) while submerged. It also had a large reserve buoyancy of 48%, meaning that almost half of its submerged displacement was water in its ballast tanks, which contributed to its ability to break through ice while surfacing. The submarine had a length of 175 metres (574 ft 2 in), a beam of 22.8 metres (74 ft 10 in), and a draft of 12.2 metres (40 ft 0 in). Its power source were two OK-650 nuclear reactors, one in each main hull, and propulsion was provided by two steam turbines, producing 50,000 horsepower (37,000 kW) for each of the two propeller shafts. It also had a diesel generator. The propellers were both covered by shrouds to prevent damage from ice when it surfaces. It had a speed of up to 16 knots (30 km/h; 18 mph) while surfaced and 27 knots (50 km/h; 31 mph) while submerged. The submarine carried 20 R-39 SLBMs, with up to 200 nuclear warheads in total. Each missile weighed 90 tons and had a range of 8,300 kilometres (5,200 mi). Its armament also included six 533-millimetre (21.0 in) torpedo tubes, which could hold regular torpedoes or anti-submarine missiles. The submarine's test depth is 1,312 ft (400 m).

The twin-hull design of the Typhoon class was necessary for it to carry R-39 missiles. It was much larger than previous Soviet SLBMs and required large missile tubes that a single pressure hull design could not accommodate. It was also the first Soviet submarine designed to operate in the Arctic. The Sevmash shipyard at Severodvinsk was expanded with an additional building hall specifically for the Typhoon class, which was the largest covered shipway in the world. TK-202 (Note: ТК stands for Тяжелый Крейсер in Russian, meaning "heavy cruiser".) was laid down on 1 October 1980, launched 26 April 1982, and commissioned on 28 December 1983. It was the second ship of its class to be built.

== History ==
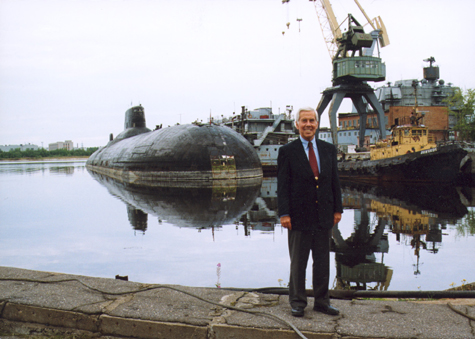
U.S. senator Richard Lugar in front of TK-202 in 1999

TK-202 entered service in the Northern Fleet of the Soviet Navy and was part of the 18th Submarine Division, which included all six boats of the Typhoon class from 1989. The division was stationed at the Zapadnaya Litsa naval base in the Kola Peninsula. The purpose of the submarines was to go on long patrols in the Arctic Ocean as part of the Soviet Union's nuclear deterrent.

TK-202 and one of its sister ships, TK-12, were taken out of the service in 1996 and placed in the reserve fleet. In December 1998 the United States announced it would assist Russia in scrapping all six of the Typhoon-class submarines, as part of the Nunn–Lugar Cooperative Threat Reduction program. TK-202 arrived at the Sevmash shipyard in Severodvinsk to be decommissioned in the first week of July 1999. Its missile tubes were cut out after that, but more work on its dismantling with U.S. funding did not start until June 2002, when nuclear fuel was removed from its reactors. TK-202 was later scrapped between 2005 and 2009.

== Sources ==
=== Books ===
- Gardiner, Robert & Chumbley, Stephen, eds. (1995). Conway's All the World's Fighting Ships 1947–1995. London: Conway Maritime Press. ISBN 1-55750-132-7.
- Polmar, Norman & Noot, Jurrien (1991). Submarines of the Russian and Soviet Navies, 1718–1990. Annapolis, Maryland: Naval Institute Press. ISBN 0-87021-570-1.
- Polmar, Norman; Moore, K. J. (2003). Cold War Submarines: The Design and Construction of U.S. and Soviet Submarines, 1945–2001. Dulles, Virginia: Potomac Books Inc. ISBN 1-57488-594-4.

=== Websites ===
- Cole, Brendan (6 February 2023). "Russia Loses World's Largest Nuclear Submarine". Newsweek.
- Friedman, Norman (February 1999). "World Naval Developments: The Typhoon Saga Ends". Proceedings of the U.S. Naval Institute.
- Kozachenko, Aleksey (20 July 2022). "Почему самая большая в мире АПЛ «Дмитрий Донской» выведена из состава ВМФ?" [Why was the largest nuclear submarine in the world "Dmitry Donskoy" decommissioned?]. Argumenty i Fakty (in Russian).
- Kudrik, Igor (12 June 2002). "Russia scraps Typhoons". Bellona Foundation.
- Pike, John (25 August 2000). "941 TYPHOON - Russian and Soviet Nuclear Forces". Federation of American Scientists.
- Weichert, Brandon J. (20 March 2025). "Russia's Typhoon-class Submarine Is Now a Museum". The National Interest.
- Yemelyanenkov, Aleksandr (28 December 2021). "Подводный крейсер особого назначения: "Дмитрий Донской" еще послужит флоту" [Special purpose underwater cruiser: "Dmitry Donskoy" will still serve the fleet]. Rossiyskaya Gazeta (in Russian).
- "Командир атомной подлодки Олег Цыбин: "Дмитрий Донской" на 100% отдал свой долг Родине" [Nuclear submarine commander Oleg Tsybin: "Dmitry Donskoy" has 100% fulfilled its duty to the Motherland]. Zen News (in Russian). 13 December 2022.
