= Russian submarine Severstal =

Retired vessel, service from 1988 to 2004

History

→ Soviet Union → Russia
- Name: TK-20; Severstal (since 2000)
- Namesake: Severstal
- Builder: Sevmash
- Laid down: 6 January 1987
- Launched: July 1988
- Commissioned: 22 December 1989
- Out of service: In reserve, 2004
- Status: Decommissioned, awaiting dismantling

General characteristics
- Class & type: Typhoon-class submarine
- Displacement: 23,200 t (22,800 long tons) surfaced; 48,000 t (47,000 long tons) submerged
- Length: 175 m (574 ft 2 in)
- Beam: 22.8 m (74 ft 10 in)
- Draft: 12.2 m (40 ft 0 in)
- Installed power: 2 × nuclear reactors
- Propulsion: 2 × steam turbines; 2 × shafts
- Speed: 16 kn (30 km/h; 18 mph) surfaced; 27 kn (50 km/h; 31 mph) submerged
- Test depth: 1,312 ft (400 m)
- Complement: 160 officers and sailors
- Armament: 20 × missile silos; 6 × 533 mm (21 in) torpedo tubes

Severstal (TK-20; Russian: ́Северста́ль ТК-20) is a retired submarine of the Project 941 Akula (NATO reporting name Typhoon) class of the Russian Navy and formerly the Soviet Navy. The boat was laid down on 6 January 1987, launched in July 1988, and commissioned on 22 December 1989, with the designation TK-20. It spent its entire career in the Northern Fleet, and received the name Severstal in 2000.

Severstal was designed to operate in the Arctic Ocean and to carry R-39 submarine-launched ballistic missiles, with each of them capable of holding several nuclear warheads. As part of the country's nuclear deterrent, its main armament consisted of twenty missile tubes. The submarine conducted training missions at the North Pole multiple times, and during some of them it launched all twenty of its rockets at the same time. Severstal carried out a total of eight missions and 55 missile launches during its career. It was inactive from c. 1999–2000, and, in 2004, it was laid up and placed in the reserve as Russia retired the R-39 missile. Since then it has remained docked in Severodvinsk, next to its sister ship Arkhangelsk. Despite some reports that they could be modernized and restored to active service, by March 2015 they had been decommissioned, and, as of 2019, they are waiting to be scrapped.

== Design and construction ==
Work on the third generation of Soviet nuclear-powered submarines was accelerated in response to the development of the Trident submarine-launched ballistic missile (SLBM) by the United States. At their summit meeting in November 1974 in Vladivostok, Soviet General Secretary Leonid Brezhnev told U.S. President Gerald Ford that the Soviet Union would build a new strategic missile submarine if the U.S. continued its development of the Trident. Brezhnev reportedly used the word typhoon ("тайфун") to refer to the new submarine, which later became its NATO code-name. It became a counter to the Ohio-class submarine of the United States Navy, which was built to carry Trident nuclear missiles. The Project 941 Akula (Russian: Акула, lit. 'shark', NATO reporting name: Typhoon class) was designed by the engineer Sergey Kovalyov at the Rubin Design Bureau, which began developing it in 1972. The R-39 missile that the submarine would carry was being worked on at the same time.

The Typhoon class has a unique design that uses two main pressure hulls, one on each side of the submarine, instead of a single pressure hull. The living quarters for the crew, the propulsion machinery, and other equipment are located in them. Each of the main pressure hulls is divided into eight compartments, and has a length of 149 metres (488 ft 10 in) and a diameter of 7.2 metres (23 ft 7 in). The starboard hull includes a recreation area for the crew consisting of a gym, a swimming pool, a sauna, and an aviary. Twenty missile silos are placed in between the main pressure hulls, in front of the sail. In total the submarine has five pressure hulls: its control room is located in a pressure hull directly below the sail, between the two main hulls; a fourth hull contains the torpedo tubes and is located on the bow; and a fifth is located behind the control room and connects the two main hulls. There is an escape chamber above each of the main hulls, allowing for the entire crew of 160 officers and sailors to be taken to the surface.

Severstal and the other vessels of its class are the largest submarines ever built. It has a displacement of 23,200 tonnes (22,800 long tons) while surfaced and 48,000 tonnes (47,000 long tons) while submerged. It also has a large reserve buoyancy of 48%, meaning that almost half of its submerged displacement is water in its ballast tanks, which contributes to its ability to break through ice while surfacing. The submarine has a length of 175 metres (574 ft 2 in), a beam of 22.8 metres (74 ft 10 in), and a draft of 12.2 metres (40 ft 0 in). Its power source are two OK-650 nuclear reactors, one in each main hull, and propulsion is provided by two steam turbines, producing 50,000 horsepower (37,000 kW) for each of the two propeller shafts. It also has a diesel generator. The propellers are both covered by shrouds to prevent damage from ice when it surfaces. It has a speed of up to 16 kn (30 km/h; 18 mph) while surfaced and 27 kn (50 km/h; 31 mph) while submerged. The submarine carried 20 R-39 SLBMs, with up to 200 nuclear warheads in total. Each missile weighed 90 tons and had a range of 8,300 kilometres (5,200 mi). Its armament also includes six 533 mm (21.0 in) torpedo tubes, which can hold regular torpedoes or anti-submarine missiles. The submarine's test depth is 1,312 ft (400 m).

The twin-hull design of the Typhoon class was necessary for it to carry R-39 missiles. It was much larger than previous Soviet SLBMs and required large missile tubes that a single pressure hull design could not accommodate. It was also the first Soviet submarine designed to operate in the Arctic. The Sevmash shipyard at Severodvinsk was expanded with an additional building hall specifically for the Typhoon class, which is the largest covered shipway in the world. TK-20 (Note: ТК stands for "Тяжелый Крейсер" in Russian, meaning "heavy cruiser".) was laid down on 6 January 1987, launched in July 1988, and commissioned on 22 December 1989. It was the sixth and last ship of its class to be built, because one more that was under construction and another that was planned were cancelled.

== History ==
TK-20 entered service in the Northern Fleet of the Soviet Navy and was part of the 18th Submarine Division, which included all six boats of the Typhoon class from 1989. The division was stationed at the Zapadnaya Litsa naval base in the Kola Peninsula. The purpose of the submarines was to go on long patrols in the Arctic Ocean as part of the Soviet Union's nuclear deterrent. TK-20 traveled to the North Pole to practice surfacing through ice and firing missiles several times, and carried out a total of eight missions and 55 missile launches during its career. During an exercise on 25 August 1995, under the command of Captain 1st rank Aleksandr Bogachyov, TK-20 fired several missiles at targets in the Arkhangelsk Oblast. Days before that, on 21 August, the submarine received a dent on its outer hull while practicing breaking through ice. It carried out a similar exercise in November 1996 and another in 1997 during which it launched all twenty of its missiles at once. After the 1997 mission, it was recognized as the best submarine in the Northern Fleet. TK-20 became known as the most combat experienced boat of the Typhoon class, because it launched all of its missiles more than once.

During the 1990s, three of the six boats of the Typhoon class were decommissioned, leaving TK-20, TK-208 (later renamed Dmitry Donskoy), and TK-17 (later renamed Arkhangelsk) in active service. In December 1998, the United States announced it will assist Russia in scrapping all six of the Typhoon-class submarines, but, in January 2000, it was reported that three boats will remain in service to test new missiles and maintain the Navy's strategic force structure. Also that year, TK-20 received the name Severstal, after the company. There was some indication that Severstal and Arkhangelsk would undergo modernization to carry a new ballistic missile, just as Dmitry Donskoy had received around that time, and would stay in active service until 2010–2012. The phasing out of the R-39 missile, which the submarine was built to carry, occurred in the early 2000s. In 2002, the submarine was reported as having been inactive over the previous two or three years, not going on any missions. Severstal was laid up in 2004 and placed in the reserve, along with Arkhangelsk. Since then both vessels have been docked in Severodvinsk. As of 2019, a technical crew on board to oversee its basic maintenance.

In April 2009, Severstal was visited by the head of the Accounts Chamber of Russia, Sergey Stepashin, where he discussed the possibility of bringing both it and Arkhangelsk back into service with the head of the Sevmash shipyard. The commander-in-chief of the Russian Navy, Admiral Vladimir Vysotsky, said, in May 2010, that the two Typhoon-class submarines would remain in the Navy until 2019, and that they were looking into their potential modernization. In May 2013, sources in the Russian Ministry of Defense claimed that Severstal and Arkhangelsk would be decommissioned and scrapped within six years, citing the high financial cost of modernizing them. In March 2015, the head of the Rubin Design Bureau said that both submarines had been decommissioned and will be scrapped at some future date. However, in November 2016, a spokesman of the United Shipbuilding Corporation said that a final decision has not been made yet. In January 2018, a source in Rosatom said that the company would scrap the decommissioned Severstal and Arkhangelsk after 2020. As of 2019, they were waiting to be scrapped, according to head of the Sevmash shipyard.

== Sources ==
=== Books ===
- Gardiner, Robert & Chumbley, Stephen, eds. (1995). Conway's All the World's Fighting Ships 1947–1995. London: Conway Maritime Press. ISBN 1-55750-132-7.
- Polmar, Norman & Noot, Jurrien (1991). Submarines of the Russian and Soviet Navies, 1718–1990. Annapolis, Maryland: Naval Institute Press. ISBN 0-87021-570-1.
- Polmar, Norman; Moore, K. J. (2003). Cold War Submarines: The Design and Construction of U.S. and Soviet Submarines, 1945–2001. Dulles, Virginia: Potomac Books Inc. ISBN 1-57488-594-4.

=== Websites ===
- Alimov, Timur (4 October 2016). "Видео: Как самая большая в мире подлодка получила вмятину" [Video: How the largest submarine in the world got a dent]. Rossiyskaya Gazeta (in Russian).
- Azanov, Roman (15 August 2019). ""Одна подлодка контролирует полмира"" [One submarine controls half the world]. TASS (in Russian).
- Azanov, Roman (27 March 2021). "Топ-5 самых известных атомных подлодок "Севмаша", которые всплывали во льдах Арктики" [Top 5 most famous nuclear submarines of "Sevmash", that surfaced in Arctic ice]. TASS (in Russian).
- Cole, Brendan (6 February 2023). "Russia Loses World's Largest Nuclear Submarine". Newsweek.
- Friedman, Norman (February 1999). "World Naval Developments: The Typhoon Saga Ends". Proceedings of the U.S. Naval Institute.
- Kozachenko, Aleksey (20 July 2022). "Почему самая большая в мире АПЛ «Дмитрий Донской» выведена из состава ВМФ?" [Why was the largest nuclear submarine in the world "Dmitry Donskoy" decommissioned?]. Argumenty i Fakty (in Russian).
- Kudrik, Igor (12 June 2002). "Russia scraps Typhoons". Bellona Foundation.
- Mizokami, Kyle (3 October 2016). "Watch a Russian Submarine Break Through Arctic Ice to Launch a Dummy Warhead". Popular Mechanics.
- Nilsen, Thomas (15 April 2009). "Typhoon submarines may sail again". The Barents Observer.
- Nilsen, Thomas (12 May 2010). "Typhoons will stay in service until 2019". The Barents Observer.
- Nilsen, Thomas (3 February 2018). "Captain who saved White Sea from nuclear disaster dies at 67". The Barents Observer.
- Pike, John (25 August 2000). "941 TYPHOON - Russian and Soviet Nuclear Forces". Federation of American Scientists.
- Weichert, Brandon J. (20 March 2025). "Russia's Typhoon-class Submarine Is Now a Museum". The National Interest.
- Yemelyanenkov, Aleksandr (28 December 2021). "Подводный крейсер особого назначения: "Дмитрий Донской" еще послужит флоту" [Special purpose underwater cruiser: "Dmitry Donskoy" will still serve the fleet]. Rossiyskaya Gazeta (in Russian).
- "АПЛ проекта 941 "Северсталь" и "Архангельск" будут утилизированы" [Project 941 submarines "Severstal" and "Arkhangelsk" will be scrapped]. TASS. 18 March 2015.
- "Две АПЛ класса "Акула" пустят на металлолом на 6 лет раньше срока" [Two Akula-class submarines will be scrapped 6 years earlier than planned]. RBK Group (in Russian). 21 May 2013.
- "Командир атомной подлодки Олег Цыбин: "Дмитрий Донской" на 100% отдал свой долг Родине" [Nuclear submarine commander Oleg Tsybin: "Dmitry Donskoy" has 100% fulfilled its duty to the Motherland]. Zen News (in Russian). 13 December 2022.
- "Решение об утилизации самых больших в мире АПЛ "Акула" пока не принято" [Decision on scrapping the largest in the world Akula-class submarines not made yet]. RIA Novosti (in Russian). 11 November 2016.
- "Россия утилизирует две крупнейшие в мире подлодки, сообщил источник" [Russia will scrap two of the world's largest submarines, source says]. RIA Novosti (in Russian). 19 January 2018.
