= Zapadnaya Litsa =

Zapadnaya Litsa may refer to:

- Zapadnaya Litsa (naval base), a naval base for the Russian Northern Fleet
- Zapadnaya Litsa (river), a river in Murmansk Oblast, Russia
- Zapadnaya Litsa Bay, a bay on the Murmansk Coast of the Kola Peninsula
- Zapadnaya Litsa (rural locality), a rural locality (a settlement) in Leningrad Oblast
