= Andreev Bay nuclear accident =

1982 nuclear accident near Murmansk, Russia, Soviet Union

Coordinates: 69°27′N 32°21′E

Andreev Bay location
Andreev Bay location within Russia

The Andreev Bay nuclear accident (Russian: Радиационная авария в губе Андреева) (also known as Andreyeva or Andreeva Bay) took place at Soviet naval base 569 in February 1982.

Andreev Bay was a radioactive waste repository 55 km (34 mi) northwest of Murmansk and 60 km (37 mi) from the Norwegian border, on the western shore of the Zapadnaya Litsa (Kola Peninsula). The repository entered service in 1961. In February 1982, a nuclear accident occurred in which radioactive water was released from a pool in building #5. Cleanup of the accident took place from 1983 to 1989. About 700,000 tonnes (770,000 tons) of highly radioactive water leaked into the Barents Sea during that time. About 1,000 people took part in the cleanup effort. Vladimir Konstantinovich Bulygin, who was in charge of the naval fleet's radiation accidents, received the Hero of the Soviet Union distinction for his work.

== Nuclear fuel repository ==
The repository, constructed in the early 1960s, is a naval base on the shore of the Zapadnaya Litsa bay. It consists of two piers, a stationary mooring bay, a sanitation facility, spent fuel pools in building #5 (unused since 1989), three 1,000 m^{3} (35,000 cu ft) dry storage containers, an open-air field for storing spent nuclear fuel containers, a security checkpoint, and other technical facilities. The area contains spent nuclear fuel (SNF) in storage facility Building 5 consisting of about 22,000 spent nuclear fuel assemblies, solid radioactive waste (SRW) in storage facility Building 7 and its facilities 7A, 7B, 7D, and 7F, and liquid radioactive waste (LRW) in storage facility Building 6.

== Building #5 ==
Building #5 (the pool storage facility) contained two pools for storing spent fuel assemblies, encased in steel drums. Each drum contained 5-7 spent fuel assemblies, weighing 350 kg fully loaded. Each of the pools was 60 m (200 ft) long, 3 m (9.8 ft) wide, 6 m (20 ft) deep, and had a volume of 1,000 m^{3} (35,000 cu ft). Each was designed for about 2,000 drums. The drums were suspended underwater from massive chains, which were attached to consoles a certain distance from each other to avoid an uncontrolled nuclear chain reaction from starting. The water served as biological protection. The drums were placed underwater using the chains and a crane cart, but due to the construction's unreliability, drums often fell to the bottom of the pool. As a result, spent nuclear fuel drums dangerously piled up at the bottom.

One of the Andreev Bay workers recalls:

The first time I came there, I was shocked: I have never seen such a nightmare, did not even conceive it was possible. Just imagine an enormous black windowless building atop of a cliff. Entry into the building #5 was decorated by deformed trucks previously used for carrying nuclear fuel and half-torn-down heavy gates. Inside, the building was dilapidated, electric equipment in dangerous condition, the roof letting through sights of the Aurora Borealis, and, most terrifyingly, colossal beta particle contamination levels and travelling gamma waves reflected from plates and walls. Building #5 was completely radioactive inside. If a drop of water happened to fall on your head, you had to be decontaminated for a long time, since the drop contained tens of thousands of beta particles.

— The death of officer Kalinin S. V. from radiation overdose at Andreev Bay

== Dry storage containers ==
The dry storage containers consist of three steel underground blocks: "3A", "2A", and "2B": 18 m (59 ft) in diameter, 1,000 m^{3} (35,000 cu ft) each. Initially, the containers were designed as filtration structures for radioactive water from building #5, but after the 1982 accident, they were refitted to serve as dry storage for nuclear waste from building #5, as well as from nuclear submarines. Each container contains cells made of vertical steel pipes. The pipes are placed a set distance from each other in order to avoid starting an uncontrolled nuclear chain reaction. Each pipe is 4 m (13 ft) long, 400 mm (16 in) in diameter, and 250–270 mm (9.8–10.6 in) space between the pipes is filled with concrete. The "3A" container has 900 cells (for 900 drums), whereas containers "2A" and "2B" have 1,200 cells each. The drums were loaded using the KPM-40 crane.

After the refitting project was approved, the 50 cm (20 in) concrete covers over the containers were broken in order to load the drums. Since the containers remained uncovered, loading was conducted in outdoor conditions, where precipitation fell inside unobstructed. The drums were placed into the cells, displacing water, which immediately turned into radioactive vapour, due to the heat emitted from the fuel assemblies, and wind scattered it over the entire territory of the base. In his book Andreev Nuclear Bay, Anatoly N. Safonov writes, citing data, that the bottoms of the containers were not covered in steel and allowed groundwater to seep through. During winters, the groundwater inside the cells froze, deforming their steel covers.

== Timeline of the nuclear accident ==
- The right-hand pool in building #5 started leaking in February 1982. Finding cracks in the metal coating required diving into the pool, which was out of the question due to the gamma radiation levels in the vicinity of the nuclear waste drums reaching 17,000 R/h. An attempt to eliminate the leak was made by pouring in 20 sacks of flour, thus filling the cracks with dough. However, the leak continued, and the service personnel discovered ice on the right side of the building. The method was clearly ineffective. The leak's volume was estimated from the size of the icing to be about 30 L/day. A commission consisting of naval specialists and the building's designers was created in order to determine the cause of the leak. The most likely cause was determined to be destruction of the pool's metal coating.
- In April 1982, a study showed that the leak now let through 150 L/day, with the icing on the right side of the building having gamma-ray levels of 1.5 R/h.
- In April 1982, the basement part of the building was filled with 600 m^{3} (21,000 cu ft) of concrete. The effort proved ineffective.
- At the end of September 1982, the right-hand pool's leak reached dangerous levels of 30 tonnes per day. There was a risk of exposure of the top parts of the nuclear fuel assemblies, potentially leading to subsequent irradiation of the service personnel, as well as contamination of the entire aquatic territory of the nearby Zapadnaya Litsa bay. In order to safeguard against gamma radiation, it was proposed to cover the pool with iron-lead-concrete covers and then move the nuclear fuel assemblies into dry storage.
- In November 1982, a sharp decline in the amount of leakage was detected. At the same time, the left pool developed a leak of 10 tonnes per day. Experts attribute this to the building sagging under the weight of the iron-lead-concrete covers mounted over the pool, weighing thousands of tonnes. It was later determined that it was only good fortune that prevented the collapse of the whole building.
- December 1982 saw completion of cover construction over the right-hand pool, and the left-hand pool was 30% covered. All of the water from the right-hand pool drained into the bay, and the left-hand pool leak dropped to 3 tonnes/day.
- A special Ministry of Defense commission arrived on 14 February 1983. It confirmed the closing of the repository, except for works related to the cleanup of the accident. No more spent nuclear fuel was loaded in building #5.
- March 1983 through September 1987 saw spent fuel unloaded from the left-hand pool. All of the fuel was unloaded and sent to the Mayak nuclear facility, except for 25 drums, which could not be extracted. They were all buried in boron to capture neutron emissions.
- On 13 December 1989, all of the spent nuclear fuel (about 1,500 drums) from building #5, except for the 25 remaining at the bottom of the left-hand pool, were unloaded. Building #5 was never used for storing spent nuclear fuel again.

Several possible causes that led to the destruction of the pools exist:

1. Poor welding seam quality in the pools' coating.
2. Seismic activity.
3. Temperature changes in the right-hand pool's water.

Experts consider version #3 the most likely—temperature changes in the pool's water stressed welding seams, tearing them. When building #5's repository was designed, it was assumed that the water would be kept at a constant temperature by heat from the nuclear assemblies suspended under the surface. A separate water heating system was thus deemed unnecessary. But the designers were wrong: the harsh Arctic climate covered the pool's surface with a 20 cm (7.9 in) layer of ice in winter. To solve this problem, the ice was melted using steam from the boiler, in blatant violation of radiation safety protocol. A hole was drilled in the ice cover, a pipe was inserted into the hole, and steam was pumped through the pipe under the ice, melting it. Radioactive aerosols spread through the whole building, leaking into the air outside.

=== An accident during the cleanup ===
During extraction of drums from the bottom of the pools, an accident occurred that might have cost two workers' lives. After the left-hand pool was covered with protective lids, cleanup workers cut windows inside them with torches in order to feed in a capturing device that lifted drums from the bottom. The windows were covered with iron sheets to protect the workers from radiation and prevent them from falling in. During this work, one of the workers, a starshina 1st stage, inadvertently stepped onto an iron sheet covering one of the windows. The sheet failed to support his weight, and it dropped with him into the pool's radioactive water. As the worker fell, his legs got caught under some nuclear waste drums, and the water splashed onto the others, who also did not have radiation protection equipment.

From the memoirs of the cleanup effort's leader after the accident, A. N. Safonov:

Everyone present was terrified, knowing there were numerous nuclear waste drums at the bottom, radiating up to 17,000 R/h. Simple arithmetic told me that next to one of those drums, he will receive a dosage equal to 4.7 R/s.

— In death's embrace under radioactive water at the Andreev Bay

A moment later, another worker, a starshina 2nd stage, heroically jumped into the pool to save his comrade's life. A few seconds later they both surfaced, completely soaked in radioactive water. Witnesses say their faces had expressions of utter terror.

The first worker himself remembers:

In that moment, I thought I was in Hell. When I found myself submerged in radioactive water, and my legs were caught by death ray-emitting drums, death's hot embrace enveloped my body and began to pull my consciousness into a warm daze. In that moment I thought I was only 20 years old and I did not want to die. Just then, my friend and savior Semenov, risking his own life, freed my legs from under the nuclear waste drums, and we emerged at the pool's surface.

— In death's embrace under radioactive water at the Andreev Bay

Both workers were sent into the showers for decontamination. The dosimeter's arrow kept passing tens of millions of beta decays. Both workers had hair removed from all parts of their bodies, slept separately from everyone else and received food in rubber gloves, since their bodies themselves were now sources of gamma radiation. The dose to which they were exposed is unknown, as their dosimeters sank in the pool.

From the memoirs of A. N. Safonov:

We only managed to wash our bodies from radioactive chemicals by the end of the month. We had to remove the skin on heels and partly on our hands with razors until they bled, since these areas resisted decontamination.

— In death's embrace under radioactive water at the Andreev Bay

=== An uncontrolled chain reaction during the cleanup ===
When nuclear fuel drums were unloaded from building #5 to be loaded into the dry storage containers, it often happened that cells, deformed from physical impacts and ice, spilled nuclear fuel. The working sailors then used regular shovels to pour the fuel into the cement-encased vertical steel pipes of the storage containers. These actions led to accumulation of critical mass and subsequent uncontrolled chain reactions, glowing from Cherenkov radiation and emitting a buzzing sound, which quickly subsided.

Here is how A. N. Safonov describes this:

This phenomenon was observed by nearby sailors. Of course, we did not file any official reports. The navy usually concealed such information to avoid taking the blame…

Blue-green flashes of light were also observed in the left-hand pool in building #5 during the work on lifting nuclear waste drums from the bottom. That they were uncontrolled chain reactions was confirmed by the physicist and senior lieutenant Leonid Grigorievich Konobritski, who served then in building #5.

== See also ==
- Kyshtym disaster
- Chernobyl disaster
- 1958 Mailuu-Suu tailings dam failure
- Semipalatinsk Test Site

== Literature ==
- Сафонов А., Никитин А. (2009). Ядерная губа Андреева (PDF).
