= Lev Zhiltsov =

Lev Mikhailovich Zhiltsov
- Native name: Лев Михайлович Жильцов
- Born: 2 February 1928; Nakhabino, Moscow Oblast, USSR
- Died: 27 February 1996 (aged 68) Moscow, Russia
- Allegiance: Soviet Union
- Branch: Soviet Navy
- Service years: 1945–1977
- Rank: Rear Admiral
- Commands: Soviet submarine K-3 Leninsky Komsomol
- Conflicts: Cold War
- Awards: Hero of the Soviet Union

Lev Mikhailovich Zhiltsov (Russian: Лев Михайлович Жильцов; 2 February 1928 – 27 February 1996) was a Soviet Navy submarine commander and Admiral of the Cold War.

Zhiltsov entered the Naval preparatory school in Leningrad in 1942 and the Caspian Higher Naval School in 1945, the date from which his naval service officially began. In 1949, he graduated, was commissioned an officer, and assigned to serve on the submarine M-113 of the Black Sea Fleet. In 1951, Zhiltsov attended Advanced Naval Submarine Navigation courses in Leningrad, which he completed with distinction in 1952. In 1954, he was assigned as second in command to the first Soviet nuclear submarine. In June 1959, he was awarded the Order of Lenin for his active participation in the construction of the lead Soviet nuclear-powered submarine and given command of that submarine, the submarine Leninsky Komsomol in the rank of Captain 2nd Rank. In 1962, he twice took his submarine to the North Pole and on 20 July 1962 Zhiltsov was awarded the title of Hero of the Soviet Union for this exploit. In 1966, he graduated from the Naval Academy in Leningrad, after which he became commander of the Baltic Fleet submarine division and held various other command positions in the Baltic and Northern Fleets. He was promoted to Rear Admiral in 1975 and retired from active duty in 1977. While retired, he served on the Navy Acceptance Commission for new ships before he died in 1996.
