= Soviet submarine K-3 Leninsky Komsomol =

First soviet nuclear submarine

Coordinates: 59.99556228836196°N 29.736838713012173°E

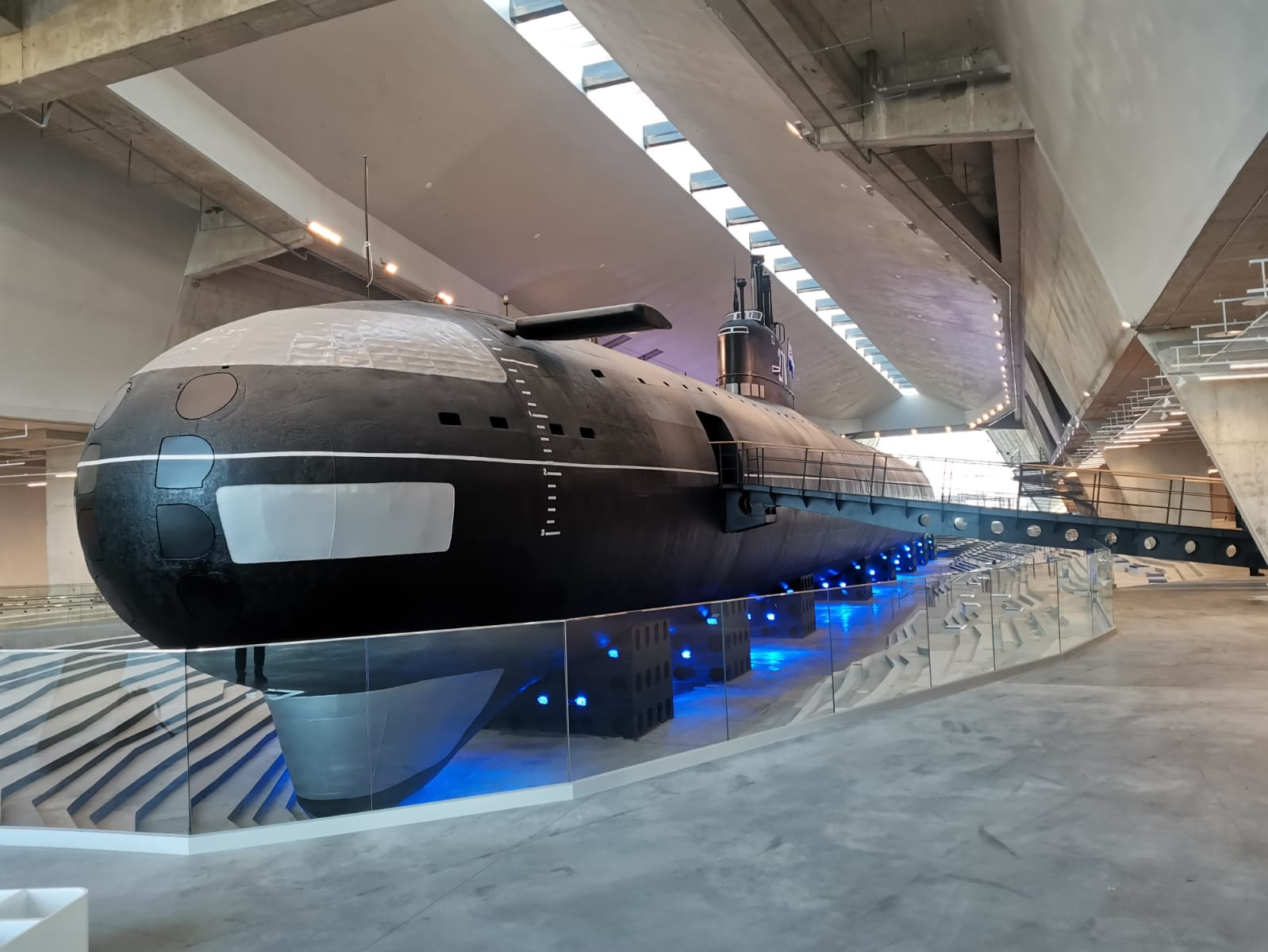
- K-3 on display at the Museum of Naval Glory, Kronstadt

History

Soviet Union
- Name: K-3
- Builder: Plant 402, Molotovsk
- Laid down: June 1954
- Launched: 9 August 1957
- Christened: 4 June 1958
- Commissioned: 4 June 1958
- Decommissioned: 1988
- Renamed: Leninsky Komsomol 9 October 1962
- Home port: Zapadnaya Litsa
- Status: Museum ship in the Museum of Naval Glory in Kronstadt

General characteristics
- Class & type: Project 627
- Displacement: Surfaced: 3,065 long tons (3,433 short tons); Submerged: 4,750 long tons (5,320 short tons)
- Length: 107.4 m (352 ft 4 in)
- Beam: 7.9 m (25 ft 11 in)
- Draft: 5.6 m (18 ft 4 in)
- Propulsion: two water-cooled reactors VM-A 70 MW each with steam generators, two turbogear assemblies 60-D (35,000 hp total), two turbine-type generators GPM-21 1,400 kW each, two diesel generators DG-400 460 hp each, two auxiliary electric motors PG-116 450 hp each, two shafts. Submarine of project 645 had two liquid metal-cooled reactors VT-1 73 MW each and two more powerful turbine-type generators ATG-610 1,600 kW each, no diesel generators.
- Speed: 30 knots (56 km/h; 35 mph)
- Endurance: Unlimited
- Test depth: 300 m (980 ft)
- Complement: usually 104–105 men (including 30 officers)
- Sensors & processing systems: MG-200 "Arktika-M" sonar system for target detection, "Svet" detection of hydroacoustic signals and underwater sonar communication sonar system, "MG-10" hydrophone station (project 627 submarines had "Mars-16KP"), "Luch" sonar system for detection of underwater obstacles, "Prizma detection radar for surface targets and torpedo control, "Nakat-M" reconnaissance radar .
- Armament: 8 × 533 mm bow torpedo tubes (20 torpedoes SET-65 or 53-65K).

Service record
- Commanders: Leonid Osipenko, Lev Zhiltsov
- Operations: First Soviet nuclear submarine (1958); First Soviet submarine to surface at the North Pole (1962)

К-3 was a project 627 "Кит" (kit, meaning "whale"; NATO reporting name "November") submarine of the Soviet Navy's Northern Fleet, the first nuclear submarine of the Soviet Union. The vessel was prototyped in wood, with each of five segments scattered between five different locations about Leningrad, including the Astoria Hotel. She was built in Molotovsk, launched on 9 August 1957, commissioned in July 1958, and homeported at Zapadnaya Litsa on the Kola Peninsula. K‑3 was designed by Vladimir Peregoudov. Her initial captain was Leonid Osipenko, and the executive officer was Lev Zhiltsov, who had the important task of assembling the first crew.

== Arctic voyage ==
On 17 June 1962, by this time under the command of Zhiltsov, К-3 reached the North Pole underwater, the first among Soviet submarines (a feat performed nearly four years earlier by USS Nautilus). The submarine also surfaced on the Pole (a feat performed three years before by USS Skate). For this voyage, she was awarded the name Leninsky Komsomol (Ленинский Комсомол) on 9 October 1962, and her crew, rather than training in military operations, began taking part in many congresses and conferences. This idle life continued until summer 1967 when a boat that had been scheduled for patrol in the Mediterranean Sea was unavailable. Leninsky Komsomol was tasked with that patrol. She was assigned a new commander, Captain Second Rank Stepanov, and her executive officer arrived aboard only two hours before she put to sea. Whatever the initial material condition of the boat, the crew was not ready for sea. By the time they reached the Mediterranean, the air regeneration system had failed and the temperature on board was 35–40 °C (95–104 °F).

Once in the Mediterranean, Leninsky Komsomol was given the mission of following an American ballistic missile submarine.

== 1967 accident ==
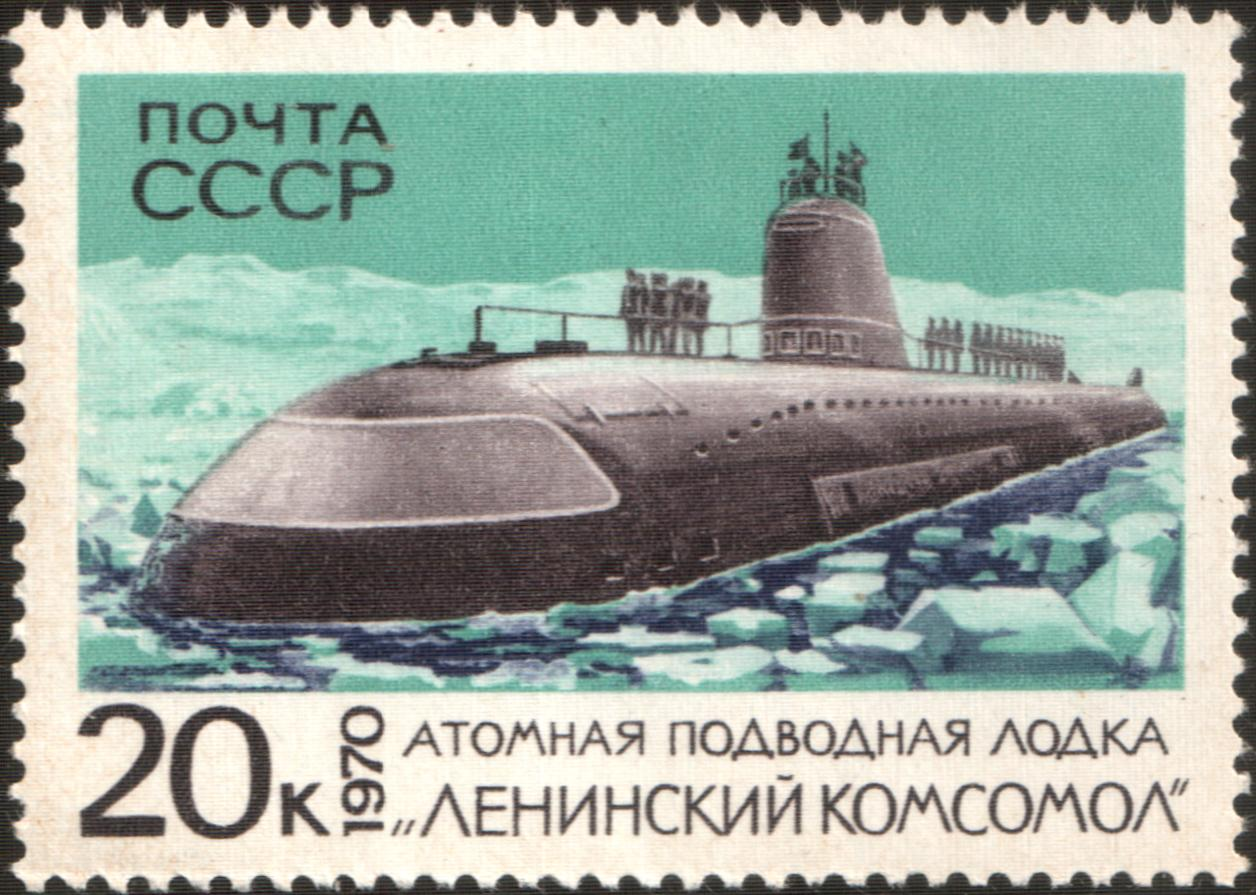
K-3 Leninsky Komsomol on a Soviet postage stamp

On 8 September 1967, while transiting the Norwegian Sea, a fire broke out in the submarine's hydraulic system, and crew members in the compartment when the fire broke out had to evacuate the compartment. The flames spread to other parts of the submarine. The automatic extinguishers were based on carbon dioxide gas, which killed the crew members who were in the first and second compartments in the submarine. When the dividing door in the bulkhead from the third compartment was opened to see what had happened to the people in the second compartment, the gas spread, and more people lost consciousness. The forward compartments were then completely sealed off, and the submarine surfaced. Four days later, Leninsky Komsomol returned to base. 39 crew members died in the fire.

The subsequent investigation determined that the most probable cause of the fire was ignition of an explosive concentration of hydraulic oil, and that the reactions of the crew were prompt and correct. Numerous awards were recommended for the crew, including seven nominations for Hero of Soviet Union—four of them posthumous. A later commission from Moscow, however, found a cigarette lighter in the torpedo compartment and found the position of a sailor's body suspicious. They ruled that the sailor's smoking had caused the fire and prohibited any award.

In 1991 a memorial was erected in Zapadnaya Litsa to the men lost aboard К-3. In 2007 the Russian Awards Committee (Российский наградной комитет) issued the medal "For 50 Years Of The Submarine "Leninskiy Komsomol"".

== Retirement ==
The submarine was decommissioned in 1988. Since its retirement the K-3 had previously been docked at the Nerpa Shipyard, Murmansk. The K-3 is now part of The Museum of Naval Glory in Kronstadt and is open to visitors.
