= 1958 Mailuu-Suu tailings dam failure =

1958 dam failure in Central Asia

Coordinates: 41°15′36″N 72°26′59″E

The 1958 Mailuu-Suu tailings dam failure in the industrial town of Mailuu-Suu, (Kyrgyz: Майлуу-Суу), Jalal-Abad Region, southern Kyrgyzstan, caused the uncontrolled release of 600,000 cubic metres (21,000,000 cu ft) of radioactive waste.

The event caused several direct casualties and widespread environmental damage. It was the single worst incident in a region of arid, mountainous western Kyrgyzstan, with a collection of shuttered Soviet-era uranium mining and processing sites, a legacy of extensive radioactive waste dumps, and a history of flooding and mudslides.

As of 2017, despite recent remediations funded by the World Bank and others, the treatment of radioactive waste at Mailuu-Suu still poses serious health and safety risks for local residents.

== Background ==
Oil was discovered here in the early 1900s. Deposits of radium-bearing barites had been discovered by Alexander Fersman in 1929, during his national mineralogical resources survey for the new Soviet government. Uranium mining began in 1946, organized by the "Zapadnyi Mining and Chemical Combine". In addition to mining, two uranium plants would process more than 10,000 short tons (9,100 t) of uranium ore, by ion exchange and alkaline leach, to produce uranium oxide for Soviet atomic bomb projects. The processed ore was both mined locally and imported from elsewhere in the Eastern Bloc.

The town was classified as one of the Soviet government's secret cities, officially known only as "Mailbox 200".

Uranium mining was halted in 1968. Operations left behind some 23 separate uranium tailings dams and 13 waste rock dumps, poorly designed on unstable hillsides above a town of 20,000 people in an area prone to both landslides and earthquakes, holding a total 1,900,000 cubic metres (67,000,000 cu ft) of material containing radionuclides and heavy metals. No attempt to stabilize or seal the material was done when Soviet mining ceased.

== Dam failure ==
On April 16, 1958, with mining and processing plants still operational, a combination of poor design, neglect, heavy rainfall and a reported earthquake caused the #7 tailings dam at Mailuu-Suu to fail. About 50% of the entire volume of the dam flowed into the swift Mailuu-Suu River, only 30 metres (98 ft) downhill from the breach. The waste then spread about 40 kilometres (25 mi) downstream across the national border into Uzbekistan then into the heavily populated Fergana Valley. The Mailuu-Suu River is a tributary of the Kara Darya, used for agricultural irrigation in the valley.

Some fatalities, building destruction, and contamination of the flood plain were reported as the direct result of the mudflow. Lack of any public response by officials makes it difficult to identify fatalities from the April 1958 event, especially as distinguished from everyday exposure.

== Aftermath ==
Longterm health effects are more measurable. Grave threats to long-term residents persist, with residents experiencing far higher rates of cancer, goiter, anemia, and other illnesses related to radiological exposure.

Mailuu-Suu was found to be one of the 10 most polluted sites in the world in a study published in 2006 by the Blacksmith Institute.

Annual spring flooding and the lack of maintenance pose a continued threat of further releases of radioactive material. In 1994, a new landslide temporarily dammed the Mailuu-Suu River. In 2002 a flood caused by a mudslide nearly submerged a tailings pit.

The World Bank approved a US$5 million grant to reclaim the tailings pits in 2004, and approved an additional $1 million grant for the project in 2011. The United Nations Development Programme, and the European Bank for Reconstruction and Development have also funded programs.

== Documents ==
The incident has been documented, but any photos and videos about the Mailuu-Suu tailings dam collapse are kept as confidential and private by the government and all archives were hidden.
