= Typhoon-class submarine =

Class of nuclear-powered ballistic missile submarines

- Project 941 Akula SSBN profile

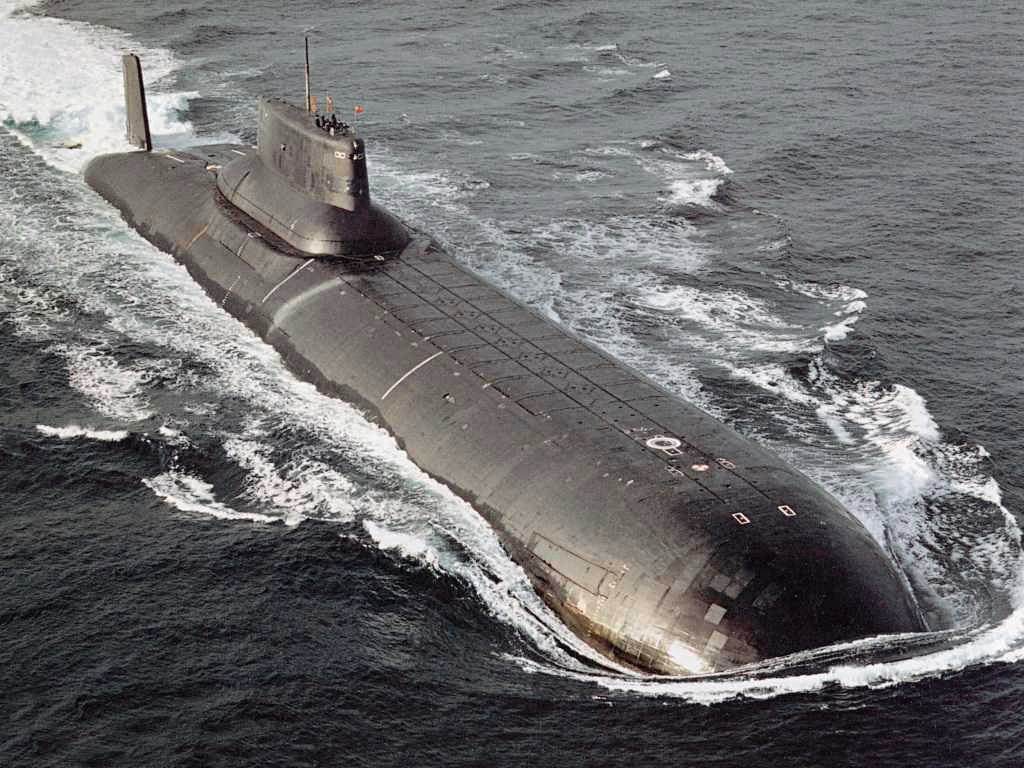
- A Typhoon-class submarine

Class overview
- Name: Project 941 Akula
- Builders: Sevmash, designed by Rubin
- Operators: Soviet Navy; Russian Navy
- Preceded by: Delta class
- Succeeded by: Borei class
- Built: 1976–1989
- In service: 1981–2023
- Planned: 7
- Completed: 6
- Canceled: 1
- Laid up: 3
- Retired: 6
- Preserved: 1

General characteristics
- Type: Ballistic missile submarine
- Displacement: 23,200 t (22,830 long tons) surfaced; 48,000 t (47,240 long tons) submerged
- Length: 175 m (574 ft 2 in)
- Beam: 23 m (75 ft 6 in)
- Draught: 12 m (39 ft 4 in)
- Propulsion: 2 × OK-650 pressurized-water nuclear reactors, 190 MWt each, HEU <= 45%; 2 × geared steam turbines, 50,000 shp (37,000 kW) each; 2 shafts with 7-bladed shrouded screws
- Speed: 22.22 knots (41.15 km/h; 25.57 mph) surfaced; 27 knots (50 km/h; 31 mph) submerged
- Range: Unlimited
- Endurance: 120+ days submerged
- Test depth: 400 m (1,300 ft)
- Complement: 160 persons
- Armament: 1 × 9K38 Igla SAM; 6 × 533 mm (21 in) torpedo tubes; 22 x Type 53 torpedoes and RPK-2 Vyuga or RPK-6 Vodopad antisubmarine missiles; D-19 launch system; 20 × RSM-52 SLBMs

The Project 941 Akula (Russian: Акула, lit. 'shark'; NATO reporting name Typhoon) is a retired class of nuclear-powered ballistic-missile submarines designed and built by the Soviet Union for the Soviet Navy. With a submerged displacement of 48,000 t (47,000 long tons), the Typhoons are the largest submarines ever built, able to accommodate comfortable living facilities for the crew of 160 when submerged for several months. The source of the NATO reporting name remains unclear, although it is often claimed to be related to the use of the word "typhoon" ("тайфун") by General Secretary Leonid Brezhnev of the Communist Party in a 1974 speech while describing a new type of nuclear ballistic-missile submarine, as a reaction to the United States Navy's new Ohio-class submarine.

The Russian Navy cancelled its modernization program in March 2012, stating that modernizing one Typhoon would be as expensive as building two new Borei-class submarines. A total of six boats of the Typhoon class had been built and a seventh was started but never finished. Three boats were decommissioned in the 1990s and were scrapped in the 2000s; another two were placed in reserve in 2004 and are currently decommissioned. With the announcement that Russia has eliminated the last R-39 Rif (SS-N-20 "Sturgeon") submarine-launched ballistic missiles in September 2012, only one Typhoon remained in service, Dmitry Donskoy, which was refitted with the more modern RSM-56 Bulava SLBM for testing. She continued to serve until February 2023, when she was decommissioned. In March 2025, Russia announced that Dmitry Donskoy was to be turned into a museum ship in Saint Petersburg.

== Description ==
Typhoon class general arrangements: 1 - outer hull; 2 - 533 mm forward torpedo tubes; 3 - pressure hull (forward); 4 - stowable forward hydroplanes; 5 - escape hatches; 6 - torpedo compartment pressure hull; 7 - sonar compartment; 8 - 20 x R-39 ballistic missile tubes; 9 - control room; 10 - escape capsules; 11 - retractable devices; 12 - Fin; 13 - radio room; 14 - reactor compartment; 15 - hangar / payload doors for towed communication buoy; 16 - protrusions to prevent ice damaging the propellers; 17 - turbine compartment; 18 - machine compartment, 19 - hydrodynamic vortex smoothing protrusions; 20 - vertical stabiliser; 21 - rudders; 22 - ducted propeller; 23 - aft hydroplanes; 24 - sonar; 25 - stowable thrusters; 26 - missile compartment; 27 - crew compartment; 28 - 2 x OK-650 nuclear reactors; 29 - propeller shaft; 30 - horizontal stabiliser; 31 - pressure hull (forward); 32 - main pressure hull (starboard); 33 - main pressure hull (port); 34 - pressure hull (fin); 35 - pressure hull (aft); 36 - rapid dive tank; i - attack periscope; ii - navigation periscope; iii - radio sextant; iv - radar/ESM system; v - snorkel; vi & viii - radio communications; vii - direction finding; ix - satellite communication/positioning antenna; x - hull mounted towed sonar array

Soviet – subsequently Russian – nuclear submarines are identified by the letter "K" followed by a number (for example, the lead boat of the Yasen class, the Severodvinsk, is K-560). K stands for Cruiser: (Крейсер). The sheer displacement of the Typhoon-class boats, comparable to several aircraft carrier classes, led to their classification as Heavy Cruisers (Тяжелый Крейсер).

Besides their missile armament, the Typhoon class featured six torpedo tubes designed to handle RPK-2 (SS-N-15) missiles or Type 53 torpedoes. A Typhoon-class submarine could stay submerged for 120 days in normal conditions, and potentially more if deemed necessary (e.g., in the case of a nuclear war). Their primary weapons system was composed of 20 R-39 (NATO: SS-N-20) submarine-launched ballistic missiles (SLBMs) with a maximum of 10 multiple independently targetable reentry vehicle nuclear warheads each. Technically, Typhoons were able to deploy their long-range nuclear missiles while moored at their docks.

Typhoon-class submarines featured multiple pressure hulls, which simplified internal design while making the vessel much wider than a normal submarine. In the main body of the boat, two long pressure hulls lie parallel, with a third, smaller pressure hull above them (which protrudes just below the sail), and two other pressure hulls for torpedoes and steering gear. This also greatly increases their survivability; even if one pressure hull is breached, the crew members in the other are safe and the potential for flooding is decreased. Its ballistic missiles were placed between the two main pressure hulls, their launch tubes enclosed only by the outer, "light" hull.

The Typhoon was capable of traveling at 28 knots (52 km/h; 32 mph) submerged.

== History ==
Size comparison of common World War II submarines with the Typhoon class

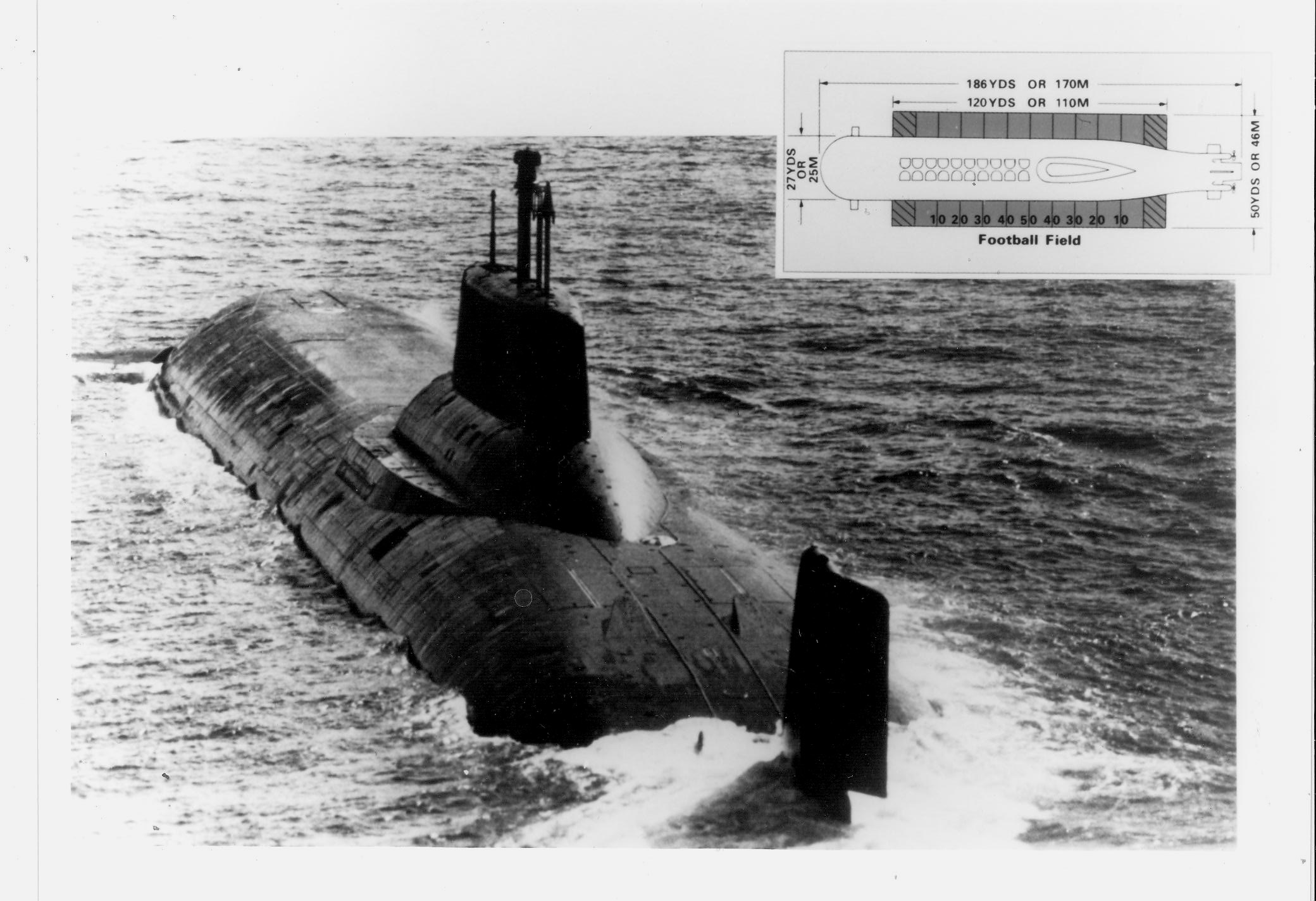
Soviet Typhoon-class ballistic missile submarine, with inset of an American football field graphic to convey a sense of the enormous size of the vessel

The Typhoon class was developed under Project 941 as the Soviet Akula class (Акула), meaning shark. It is sometimes confused with other submarines, as Akula is the name NATO uses to designate the Russian Project 971 Shchuka-B (Щука-Б)-class attack submarines. The project was developed with the objective to match the SLBM armament of Ohio-class submarines, capable of carrying 192 nuclear warheads, 100 kt each, but with significantly longer range. To accommodate this increase in range, Soviet SLBMs were substantially larger and heavier than their American adversaries (the R-39s is more than twice as heavy as the UGM-96 Trident I; it remains the heaviest SLBM to have been in service worldwide). The submarine had to be scaled accordingly.

In the early 1990s, some proposals arose to refit some of the Typhoon-class submarines to submarine cargo vessels for shipping oil, gas and cargo under polar ice to Russia's far-flung northern territories. The submarines could take up to 10,000 tonnes (9,800 long tons; 11,000 short tons) of cargo on-board and ship it under the polar ice to tankers waiting in the Barents Sea. These ships – after the considerable engineering required to develop technologies to transfer oil from drilling platforms to the submarines, and later, to the waiting tankers – would then deliver their cargo world-wide.

Six Typhoon-class submarines were built between 1976 and 1985. Originally, they were designated by hull numbers only. Names were later assigned to the four vessels retained by the Russian Navy after the dissolution of the Soviet Union. During the time of the Russian Federation, these boats were to be sponsored by either a city or company. The construction order for an additional vessel (hull number TK-210) was cancelled and never completed.

In late December 2008, a senior Navy official announced that the two Typhoon-class submarines, Arkhangelsk and Severstal, that were in reserve would not be rearmed with the new Bulava SLBM missile system. They could potentially yet be modified to carry cruise missiles or to lay mines, or could be used in special operations. In late June 2009, the Navy Commander-in-Chief, Admiral Vladimir Vysotskiy, told reporters that the two submarines would be reserved for possible future repairs and modernisation. In September 2011, the Russian defense ministry decided to write off all Project 941 Akula nuclear-powered ballistic-missile submarines until 2014. The reasons for decommissioning the Typhoon-class vessels are the restrictions imposed on Russia by the Strategic Arms Reduction Treaty and successful trials of the new Borei-class submarine.

Despite being a replacement for many types of submarines, the Borei-class submarines are slightly shorter than the Typhoon class (170 m (560 ft) as opposed to 175 m (574 ft)), and have a smaller crew (107 people as opposed to 160). These changes were in part designed to reduce the cost to build and maintain the submarines. In addition, the United States and Canada provided 80% of funds for scrapping the older Typhoon-class submarines, making it much more economical to build a new submarine, TK-13, which was scrapped in 2007–2009.

On 20 July 2022, Dmitriy Donskoi reportedly was withdrawn from the Russian Navy. This was an earlier-than-expected decommission date, as it had stated in 2021 that the submarine was expected to remain in service until 2026 as a weapons test platform. However, sources suggested in 2022 that the 2026 date was not in the Russian Navy plan. On 6 February 2023, she was reported to have been decommissioned. On 19 March 2025, Russia announced that Dmitriy Donskoi was planned to be preserved as a museum ship at the Central Naval Museum in Saint Petersburg.

== Units ==
#	Name	Laid down	Launched	Commissioned	Fleet	Status
TK-208	Dmitry Donskoy	30 June 1976	27 September 1979	23 December 1981	Northern Fleet	Decommissioned in 2023. As of 2025 planned to be preserved at the Central Naval Museum.
TK-202		22 April 1978	23 September 1982	28 December 1983	Northern Fleet	In reserve from 1996. Decommissioned in 1999, scrapped between 2005 and 2009.
TK-12		19 April 1980	17 December 1983	26 December 1984	Northern Fleet	In reserve from 1996, scrapped between 2005 and 2009
TK-13		23 February 1982	30 April 1985	26 December 1985	Northern Fleet	In reserve from 1997. Scrapped between 2005 and 2009
TK-17	Arkhangelsk	9 August 1983	12 December 1986	15 December 1987	Northern Fleet	In reserve from 2004, decommissioned as of 2015
TK-20	Severstal	27 August 1985	11 April 1989	19 December 1989	Northern Fleet	In reserve from 2004, decommissioned as of 2015
TK-210		1986	Unfinished, scrapped in 1990			

== Timeline ==
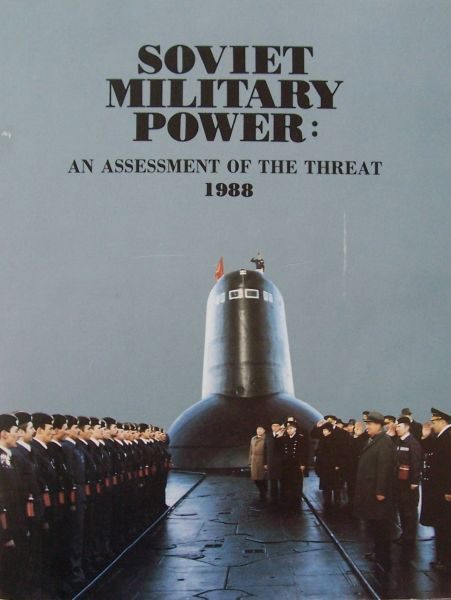
Mikhail Gorbachev inspecting TK-13 in 1987, on the cover of Soviet Military Power

TK-208 Dmitriy Donskoy (Typhoon #1)

- 10 February 1982: Entered 18th division (Zapadnaya Litsa), NOR.
- December 1982: Transferred from Severodvinsk to Zapadnaya Litsa.
- 1983–1984: Tests of D-19 missile complex. Commanders: A.V.Olkhovikov (1980–1984).
- 3 December 1986: Entered Navy Board of the Winners of the Socialist Competition.
- 18 January 1987: Entered MoD Board of Glory.
- 20 September 1989 – 1991: Repairs and refit at Sevmash to Project 941U. 1991 refit cancelled.
- 1996: Returned to 941U refit.
- 2002: Named Dmitriy Donskoy.
- 26 June 2002: End of refit.
- 30 June 2002: Start of testing.
- 26 July 2002: Entered sea trials, re-entered fleet, without missile system.
- December 2003: Sea trials; refitted to carry a new Bulava missile system. New missile system expected to be operational by 2005.
- 9 October 2005: Successfully launched SS-NX-30 Bulava SLBM from surface.
- 21 December 2005: Successfully launched SS-NX-30 Bulava SLBM from submerged position on move.
- 7 September 2006: Test launch of the Bulava missile failed after several minutes in flight due to some problems in the flight control system. The missile fell into the sea about a minute after the launch. The sub was not affected and was returning to Severodvinsk base submerged. Later reports blamed the engine of the first stage for the failure.
- 25 October 2006: Test launch of the Bulava-M missile in the White Sea failed some 200 seconds after liftoff due to the apparent failure of the flight control system.
- 28 August 2008: Underwent successful testing at the Sevmash shipyard in Severodvinsk, Arkhangelsk Oblast. More than 170 men worked with the Dmitriy Donskoy, 100 of them employed at the Sevmash plant and 70 at other companies.
- 20 July 2022: Decommissioned

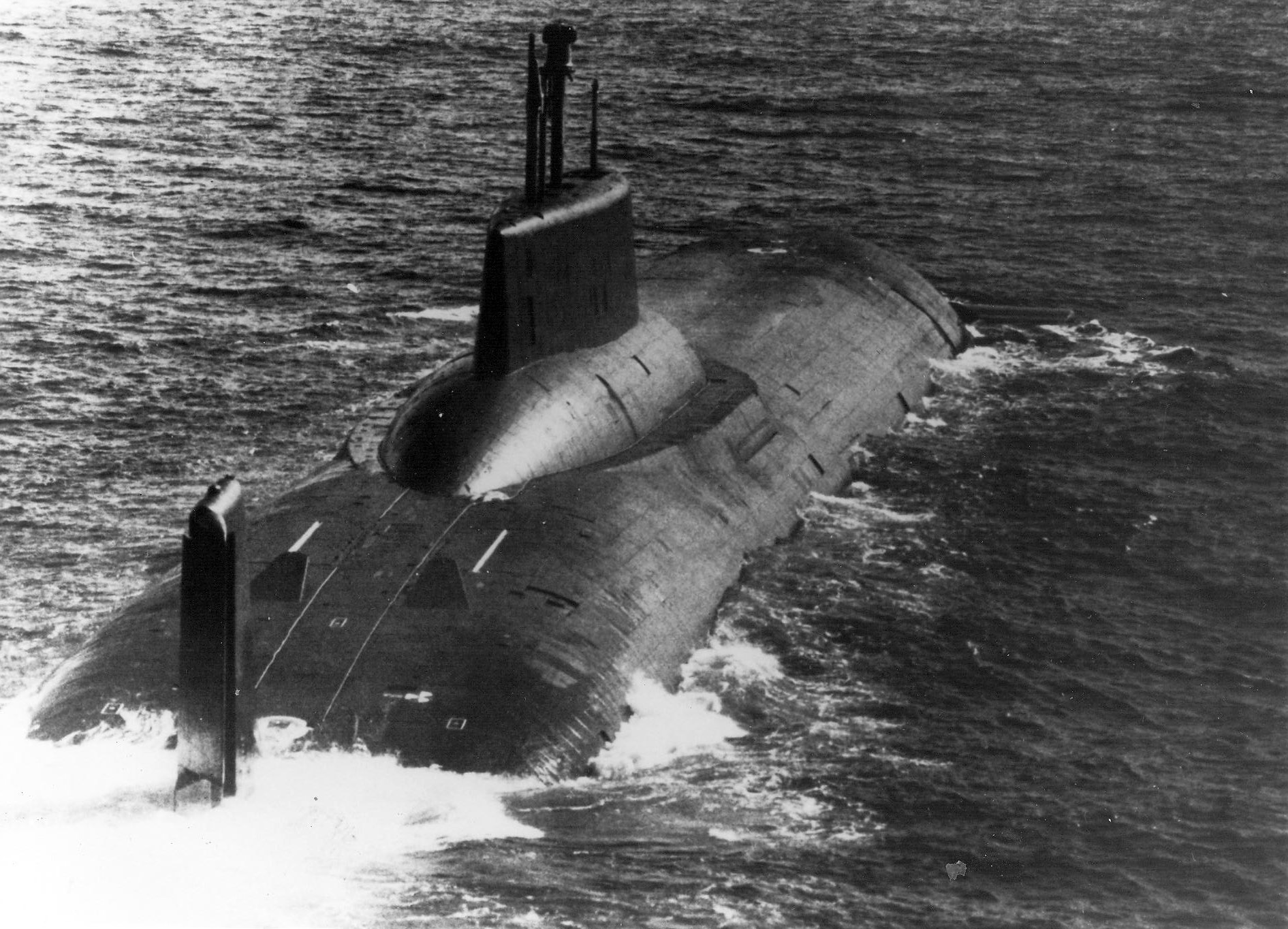
A Typhoon-class submarine on the surface in 1985

TK-17 Arkhangelsk (Typhoon #5)

- 19 February 1988: Entered 18th division (Zapadnaya Litsa) NOR.
- September 1991, damaged after a SLBM exploded in the launch silo.
- 8 January–9 November 2002: Refit at Sevmash.
- In July 2002, crew petitioned Main Navy Headquarters to adopt the name Arkhangel'sk (renamed on 18 November 2002).
- Commander: 2002-2003 V. Volkov.
- 17 February 2004: Took part in military exercises with President Vladimir Putin aboard.
- Decommissioned in 2006 and preserved. Apparent proposal to convert to cruise missile role being considered in 2019 but deemed unlikely.

TK-20 Severstal (Typhoon #6)

- 28 February 1990: Entered 18th division (Zapadnaya Litsa), NOR.
- 25 August 1996: Successfully launched SLBM
- November 1996: Successfully launched SLBM from the North Pole.
- 24 July 1999: Took part in parade on Navy Day in Severomorsk, NOR.
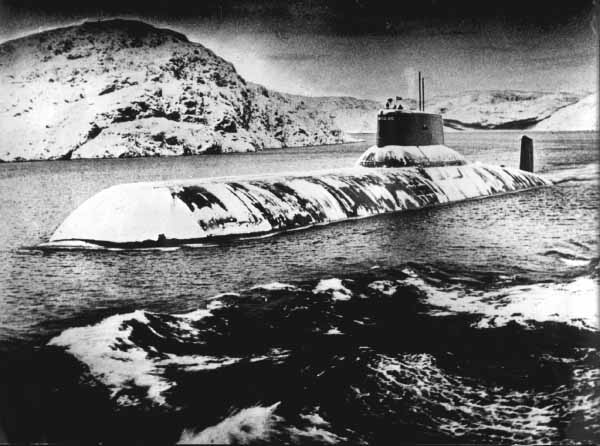
- Typhoon-class submarine TK-202 covered with ice
  November–December 1999 – distant cruise.
- 2001: named to Severstal.
- June 2001–December 2002: Repairs at Sevmash.
- Commander: A. Bogachev (2001).
- Decommissioned in 2004 or 2013 and preserved. Apparent proposal to convert to cruise missile role being considered in 2019 but deemed unlikely.

== See also ==
- List of Soviet and Russian submarine classes
- List of submarine classes in service
- Future of the Russian Navy
- Submarine-launched ballistic missile
- The Hunt for Red October

== Bibliography ==
- Pavlov, A. S. (1997). Warships of the USSR and Russia 1945–1995. Naval Institute Press. ISBN 1-55750-671-X.
- Polmar, Norman (2026). Submarines of the Russian and Soviet Navies: 1946–2026. Schiffer Publishing. ISBN 978-0-7643-7083-0.
- Polmar, Norman & Noot, Jurrien (1991). Submarines of the Russian and Soviet Navies, 1718–1990. Naval Institute Press. ISBN 0-87021-570-1.
