= Sergei Kovalev (engineer) =

Soviet and Russian naval engineer (1919–2011)

Sergei Nikitich Kovalev
- Сергей Никитич Ковалёв
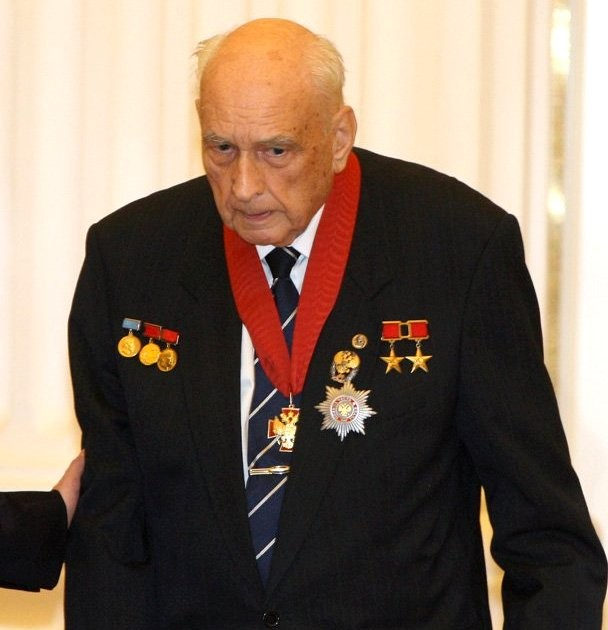
- Kovalev at the Kremlin in 2009.
- Born: 15 August 1919; Petrograd, Russian Soviet Republic
- Died: 24 February 2011 (aged 91); Saint Petersburg, Russia
- Citizenship: Soviet Union; Russia
- Engineering career
- Discipline: Naval architecture
- Employer: Rubin design bureau
- Projects: Typhoon and Delta class SSBN
- Significant advance: Head of Rubin Bureau

Sergei Nikitich Kovalev (Russian: Серге́й Ники́тич Ковалёв; 15 August 1919, Petrograd – 24 February 2011, Saint Petersburg) was a Russian engineer and architect who designed nuclear submarines for the Soviet Navy while leading the Rubin Design Bureau.

== Career ==
He was the chief designer for the following submarines: Project 658 (NATO reporting name: Hotel class), 658M (Hotel II), 667A Navaga (Yankee class), 667B (Delta I), 667BD (Delta II), 667BDR (Delta III), 667BRDM (Delta IV), and most famously project 941 Akula (Typhoon class).

92 submarines were built to Kovalyov's designs. The only nuclear submarine designed by Rubin during the Cold War for which Kovalyov wasn't the chief designer was Project 685 Plavnik (NATO Mike class), the bureau's only SSN.

== Later life ==
Kovalev remained semi-active in naval engineering throughout his life, designing ice-resistant platforms for hydrocarbon exploration on the Arctic shelf in later years.

An accomplished painter in his retirement, he was made an honorary member of the Saint Petersburg Union of Artists.

== Awards and memberships ==
Kovalev was given numerous awards for his service to the Soviet Union, including:

- Hero of Socialist Labor, twice: 1963, 1974
- Order of Lenin, four times: 1963, 1970, 1974, 1984
- Lenin Prize, 1965
- State Prize of the Soviet Union, 1978
- Order of the October Revolution, 1979
- Medal for Distinguished Labor
- Order for Merit to the Fatherland, twice
- V. G. Shukhov Gold Medal for Science and Engineering
- Order of Naval Merit
- State Prize of the Russian Federation, 2007

=== Memberships ===
- Academy of Sciences of the Soviet, full member
- Russian Academy of Sciences, full member
- Saint Petersburg Union of Artists, honorary member
