= Dzen News =

Russian online news aggregator

- Release: 21 June 2000; 26 years ago
- Available in: Russian and Ukrainian languages
- Type: News aggregator
- Website: dzen.ru/news

Dzen News (tr. Zen Novosti; formerly Yandex.News) is a Russian news aggregator. It was developed by Yandex in 2000 and acquired by VK in 2022.

Zen.News aggregates articles submitted by publishers via RSS 2.0 and ranks them according to various parameters. The articles are sorted and added to collections related to key events (so-called Stories). The process is automated. Since 2016, the service only aggregates publications from publishers with a license issued by Roskomnadzor.

In July 2019, the monthly audience of Zen.News (Yandex.News) totaled 34 million users. It had a market share of 36% in Russia.

== Controversies ==
In 2014, a report stated that the government of Moscow manipulated Zen.News (Yandex.News) search results by running a network of local online newspapers that provided positive coverage of city events. In many contexts, such as the Russo-Georgian War, anti-Putin protests in Russia, and the Russo-Ukrainian War, search results and stories were apparently manipulated, though the service denied such accusations.

In 2022, Meduza reported that stories were censored as a part of a secret agreement with the government of Russia.

During the 2022 Russian invasion of Ukraine, the service allegedly aided state propaganda by suppressing all independent coverage of the Russo-Ukrainian War.

Such practices led to sanctions against the service and key executives.
