= Argumenty i Fakty =

Russian weekly socio-political newspaper

- Owner: Government of Moscow
- Founder: All-Union Organisation "Knowledge"
- Founded: 1 January 1978; 48 years ago
- Language: Russian
- Headquarters: Moscow, Russia
- Circulation: 2,750,000 (February 2008)
- Website: aif.ru

Argumenty i Fakty (Russian: Аргументы и факты, commonly abbreviated "АиФ" and translated as Arguments and Facts) is a weekly newspaper based in Moscow and a publishing house in Russia and worldwide. Since 2014, it has been owned by the Government of Moscow.

== History and profile ==
It was founded in 1978 by the All-Union Organisation "Znanie" (Knowledge) and was published throughout the whole Soviet Union for lecturers, propagandists, political agitators. In 1980 AiF was transformed into a weekly but was available only by subscription. In the late 1980s, it was one of the leading publications in the Glasnost period. AiF was listed in the Guinness Book of Records with the largest circulation of any weekly publication. In 1990 it had a print run of 33.5 million. With the fall of the Soviet Union, publication of it was discontinued in countries outside the Russian Federation. As of 2008, the circulation was about 3 million copies, with about 8 million readers. More specifically its February 2008 circulation was 2,750,000. During this time, it was owned by Promsvyazbank and the newspaper was edited by Nikolay Zyatkov.
