= Zapadnaya Litsa (naval base) =

Russian naval base

- Russian: Западная Лица
- Part of the Russian Navy
- Russia
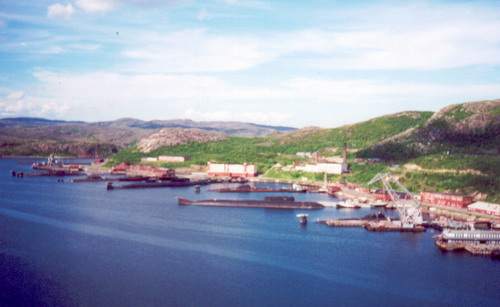
- Anchored submarines

Site information
- Owner: Russian Navy

Location
- Coordinates: 69°26.3′N 32°25′E

Garrison information
- Garrison: Northern Fleet

Zapadnaya Litsa (Russian: Западная Лица, English: Western Litsa) is a naval base of the Russian Navy, part of the Russian Northern Fleet, located in Murmansk Oblast, Russia.

== Location ==
Zapadnaya Litsa Naval Base is located within the Litsa Fjord at the westernmost point of the Kola Peninsula in Russia's far north, about 120 kilometers from Murmansk and 45 kilometers from the Norwegian border, and includes four naval facilities: Malaya Lopatka, Andreyeva Bay, Bolshaya Lopatka, and Nerpichya. A severe climate with changeable temperatures and strong winds, and a long polar night in winter (about 43 days), make the Zapadnaya Litsa region an inhospitable place. Numerous rivers, streams and lakes, rocky ground and swamps help characterize this remote and inhospitable area.

== History ==
The area of Zapadnaya Litsa was originally developed in 1939 as a small naval base for Nazi Germany, at the beginning of World War II, as a result of Molotov–Ribbentrop Pact. It was to be used for German ships under the name Basis Nord, but the successful German invasion of Norway the following year quickly rendered the port obsolete. The area remained largely untouched until the late 1950s, when it was further developed by the Soviet Union to house the fleet of the newly created nuclear submarine program of the Soviet Navy. The first facility built, Malaya Lopatka, became the home port of the first Soviet nuclear submarine, K-3 Leninsky Komsomol. In 1958, the settlement of Zaozerny (now Zaozyorsk) was formed near to the Zapadnaya Litsa base, and was kept secret and known under several different names.

Today, much of the Zapadnaya Litsa region is a cause of serious environmental concern, due to its widespread radioactive waste deposits.

== In popular culture ==
Zapadnaya Litsa was used as a location setting for the Russia episode of the video game Tomb Raider: Chronicles.

== See also ==
- Andreev Bay nuclear accident
