= Rosemary Nicholson =

British museum founder

Rosemary Nicholson MBE
- Born: Lorna Rosemary Weeks; 3 July 1919; Lancashire, England
- Died: 28 October 2004; Kensington, England
- Occupation(s): gardener, historian
- Spouse: John Edward Nicholson
- Children: 3

Lorna Rosemary Nicholson MBE (née Weeks; 3 July 1919 – 28 October 2004) was a British co-founder of the Museum of Garden History (now the Garden Museum) in London. She and her husband discovered the tomb of two men who had been Royal gardners, plant collectors and the founders of the first museum in England. Two years later she heard that the church where they were buried was to be demolished. They started a campaign that restored the church and transformed the site into the first museum of gardening which is located near the houses of parliament and the garden is free to visitors.

== Life ==
Nicholson was born on 3 July 1919 in Lancashire at Southport. Her parents were Louise Wilhelmina (born Black) and Robert Foster Jeffrey Weeks. They already had four children and she was their last. Her father had been in the military and he had been gassed. He became a mining engineer but he had not recovered so her family emigrated to South Africa when she was very young. The family lived in South Africa and then in India where her father died. She was successful in her application to attend the Slade School of Fine Art but her mother refused her permission because it was "not respectable".

In 1940 she married John Edward Nicholson who served in the Royal Navy in Glasgow – he was a few years older than her. After the war, John founded an engineering business in Cheltenham, and they had three children. In time they moved to London.

Nicholson and her husband were garden lovers and they found a tomb they were looking for in 1974. The tomb was for two important father-and-son royal gardeners,John Tradescant the Elder and John Tradescant the Younger.

The first English museum that they had founded was long gone and their collection was in Oxford but their neglected tombs were a notable but forgotten piece of funerary art. They were inside what had been the Church of St Mary at Lambeth. The deconsecrated church's site dated from at least the reign of Edward the Confessor as it had been owned by his sister. The tower was built in about 1378. The church adjoined the London home of the archbishop of Canterbury, Lambeth Palace, but it had been deconsecrated in 1972.

In 1976 it was announced that the church was to be demolished. The Nicholsons decided that they did not want this to happen. They founded a campaign to preserve the tomb, the practically roofless church and the churchyard and to create a museum to the history of gardening. The Tradescant Trust was founded in 1977 with the writer Prudence Leith-Ross and the director of the Ashmolean Museum as trustees. Rosemary was a leader and her husband had financial as well as practical skills and the museum became their focus and ambition. Prudence Leith-Ross was persuaded to write a biography of the Tradescants by Rosemary. Leith-Ross did not realise that the task would take five years.

Three years later the church had a roof and the graveyard had been cleared revealling that other botanically related graves included those of Elizabeth and William Bligh and James Sowerby.

Her husband died in 1977 and she was awarded an MBE in 1989. She retired in 2000 and died on 28 October 2004 in Kensington.

== Legacy ==
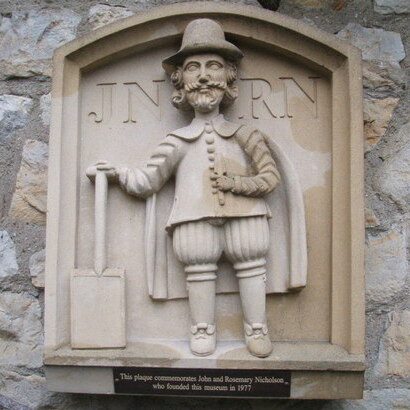
Founders' plaque to John and Rosemary Nicholson at the Garden Museum

The museum continues to thrive and thanks to a cafe, weddings and other functions it avoids public funding. The garden is especially valued as it is in an area where there are few gardens. The trustees have managed to continue to improve the site, but the museum charges for entry.
