= Lambeth Palace =

Archbishop of Canterbury's London residence

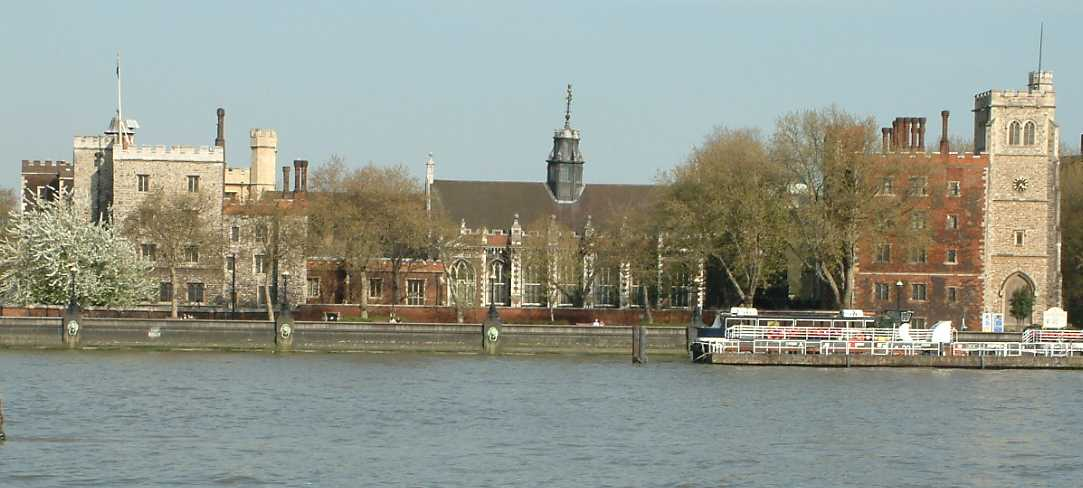
- Lambeth Palace, photographed in 2004, looking east across the River Thames. Visible are the 15th-century Lollards' Tower at left, the 17th-century Great Hall (with cupola) at centre, the late 15th-century brick gatehouse towards the right, and the 14th-century tower of St Mary-at-Lambeth on the far right.

- Location within Greater London
- 51°29′44″N 0°7′11″W
- Type: Archbishop's palace
- Location: Lambeth, London

Site notes
- Architectural style: Tudor
- Owner: See of Canterbury

Listed Building – Grade I
- Official name: Lambeth Palace
- Designated: 19 October 1951
- Reference no.: 1116399

National Register of Historic Parks and Gardens
- Official name: Lambeth Palace
- Designated: 1 October 1987
- Reference no.: 1000818

Lambeth Palace is the official London residence of the Archbishop of Canterbury. It is situated in north Lambeth, London, on the south bank of the River Thames, 400 yards (370 metres) south-east of the Palace of Westminster, which houses Parliament, on the opposite bank.

Close to Westminster and the City, the estate was first acquired by the archbishopric for the archbishop (who also has a residence at Old Palace, Canterbury) around 1200.

== History ==
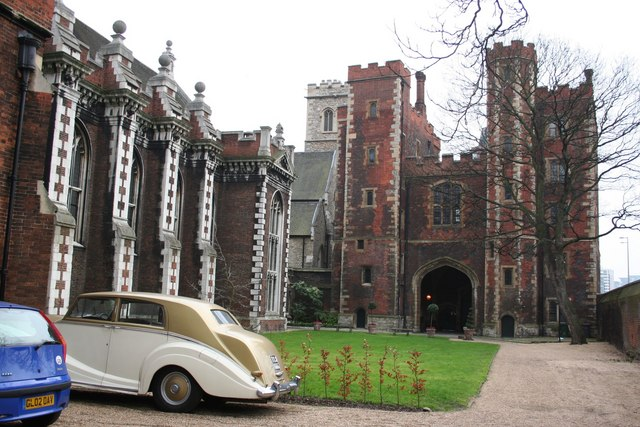
The Great Hall, St Mary-at-Lambeth, and the Tudor gatehouse (from inside), with the river on the right.

While the original residence of the archbishop of Canterbury was in his episcopal see, Canterbury, Kent, a site originally called the Manor of Lambeth or Lambeth House was acquired by the diocese around AD 1200 (though Archbishop Anselm had a house there a century earlier) and has since served as the archbishop's London residence. The site was chosen for its convenient proximity to the royal palace and government seat of Westminster, just across the Thames. The site is bounded by Lambeth Palace Road to the west and Lambeth Road to the south, but it is excluded from the parish of North Lambeth which encompasses all other surrounding land. The garden is listed and neighbours Archbishop's Park, formerly an orchard and part of the palace grounds until the early 19th century. The former church in front of its entrance has been converted to the Garden Museum. The south bank of the Thames along this reach, not part of historic London, developed slowly because the land was low and sodden: it was called Lambeth Marsh, as far downriver as the present Blackfriars Road. The origins of the name of Lambeth come from its first record in 1062 as Lambehitha, meaning 'landing place for lambs' ('hitha' or 'hithe' referring to a landing on the river): archbishops came and went by water, as did John Wycliffe, who was tried here for heresy in 1378. In the Peasants' Revolt of 1381, the palace was attacked. Cardinal Pole lay in state in the palace for 40 days after he died there in 1558.

The palace was again attacked in May 1640 during a period of popular discontent with the Arminianist theology of the Archbishop, William Laud, in the hope of capturing him. The palace was ransacked and partially demolished by the Parliamentarians in the English Civil War of the 1640s, necessitating major reconstruction, especially of the great hall, in 1660–1663.

New construction was added to the building in 1829–1834 by Edward Blore (1787–1879), who rebuilt much of Buckingham Palace later, in neo-Gothic style and it fronts a spacious quadrangle. Blore's large extensions to house the archbishop meant that the original buildings could be converted to the archdiocese's library, record office and secretariat. The palace was damaged in the Blitz of 1941. The buildings form the home of the archbishop, who is regarded as the first among equals in the Anglican Communion, and is ex officio a member of the House of Lords.

== Buildings ==
The cluster of buildings is listed in the highest category, Grade I, for its architecture. The palace consists of three main structures: the historic residence itself, which is built round a cloister; Morton's Tower, which forms the main entry; and 19th-century extensions to the East. The medieval building had three more courtyards, which have since disappeared, as has the moat that surrounded the complex. The unusual inclusion of a cloister may be because Archbishop Hubert Walter initially intended to found a Premonstratensian abbey on the site, before settling on a palace. The original timber cloister, which held the archbishop's library, was replaced by the present structure in 1830.

The oldest surviving part of the palace is the 13th-century chapel which was built in the Early English Gothic architectural style. Dating from c.1230, the chapel was bombed in the Second World War, leaving only the walls standing. It was restored in 1954–55 on a limited budget, and again in 1986-88. During the second of these restorations paintings by Leonard Rosoman were added to the reconstructed vault and an elaborate screen of 1633 made by master carpenter by Adam Brown in a classical manner was taken out of storage and re-erected across the West end of the chapel. The chapel stands above a vaulted undercroft, which has a central line of columns.

The medieval great hall, no longer extant, appears to have been rebuilt following damage in the Peasants' Revolt. The south end of the hall joined the kitchen and offices, while a stair at the north end led to the archbishop's apartments. One 14th-century room of these apartments, now known as the Guard Chamber, still stands, heavily restored, with its original elaborate roof. Further private accommodation was added when the Water or Lollards' Tower, built of Kentish Ragstone with ashlar quoins, was built at the north-west corner in 1434–35. It was extended and heightened later in the century, and again in the early 16th century when Laud's Tower was built next to it. At the top of the stair was the Archbishop's prison, a room also seen at Winchester Palace in Southwark. The massive five-storey brick gatehouse was built by Cardinal John Morton and completed in 1495 and housed eight lodgings for the Archbishop's household. Improvements continued into the 16th century, when Archbishop Cranmer built a brick tower north-east of the chapel to house his study.

The most serious damage done by the Cromwellians in the late 1640s was the demolition of the great hall and the sale of its materials. After the Restoration, it was completely rebuilt by Archbishop William Juxon in 1663 (dated) with a late Gothic hammerbeam roof. The choice of a hammerbeam roof was evocative, as it reflected the High-Church Anglican continuity with the Old Faith (the King's (Charles II) brother was an avowed Catholic) and served as a visual statement that the Interregnum was over. As with some Gothic details on University buildings of the same date, it is debated among architectural historians whether this is "Gothic survival" or an early work of the "Gothic Revival". The diarist Samuel Pepys recognised it as "a new old-fashioned hall" and the hall has classical details as well as gothic ones.

Major work was done by Blore in 1829–1833, with large parts of the medieval palace being rebuilt or heavily restored, and an extensive new wing in Gothic revival style added to the East.

Among the portraits of the archbishops in the palace are works by Hans Holbein, Anthony van Dyck, William Hogarth and Sir Joshua Reynolds.

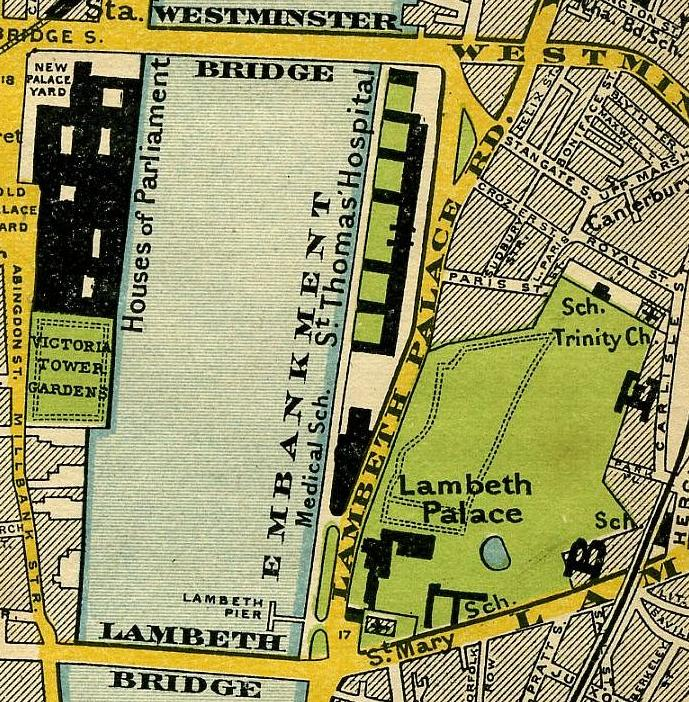
Map of the Thames between Westminster and Lambeth Bridges, with Westminster Palace on the west bank and Lambeth Palace on the east, 1897

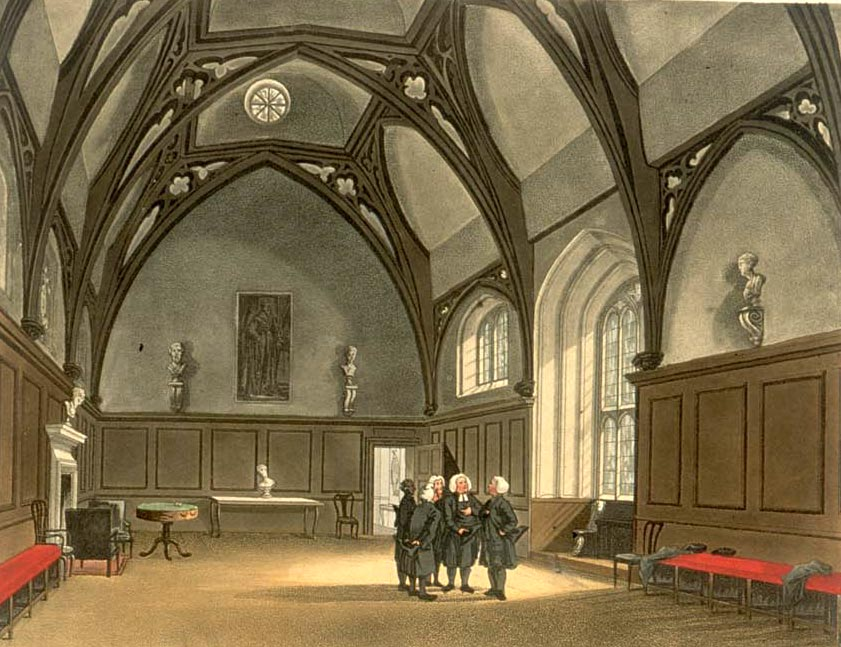
The Guard Room

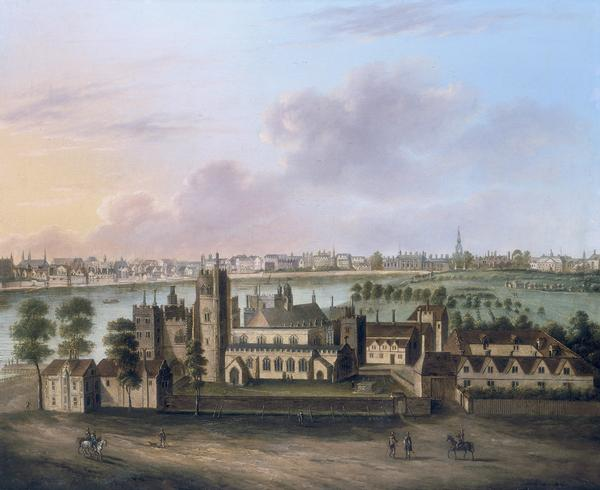
Lambeth Palace from the south c. 1685

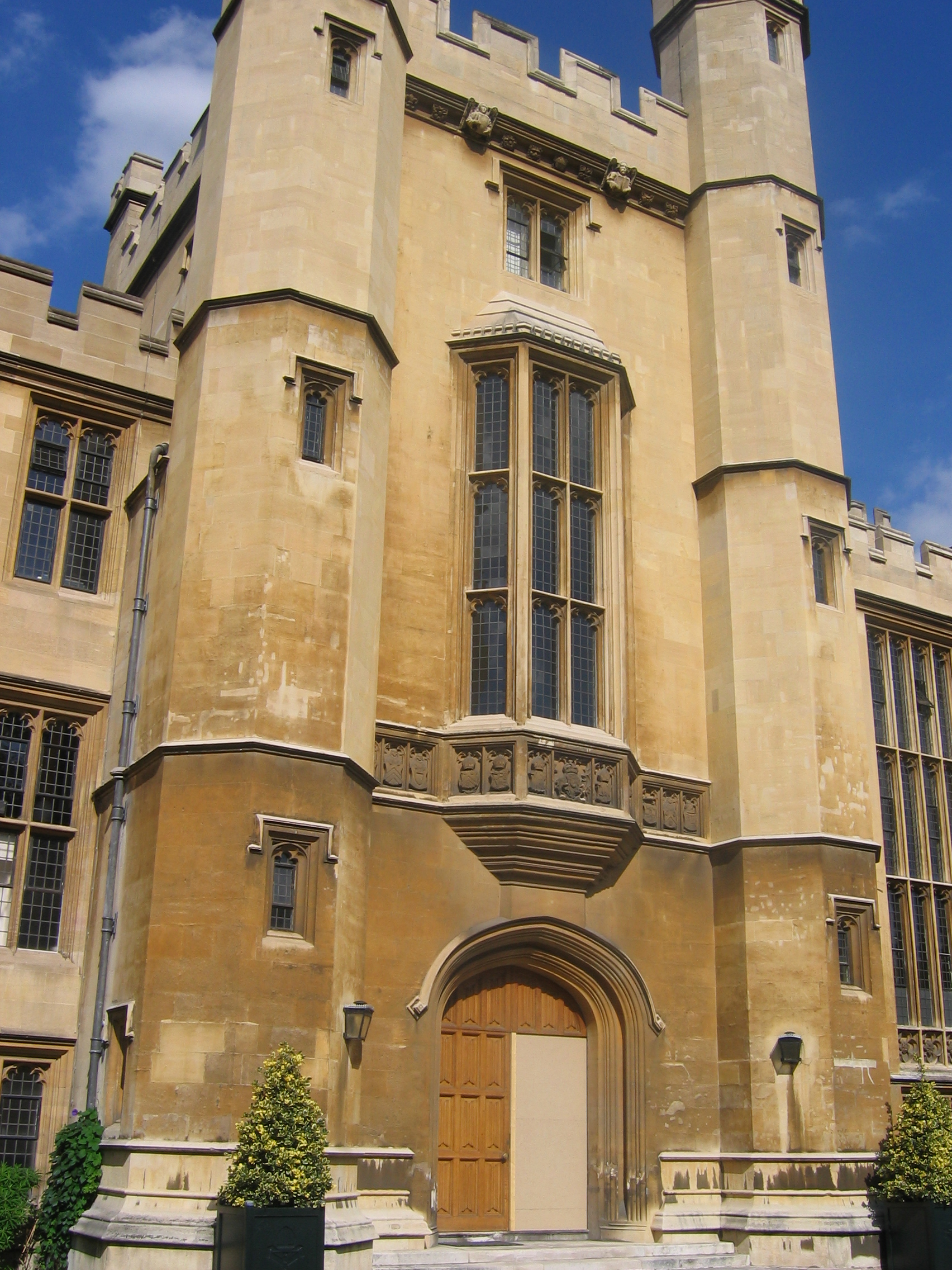
Main entrance

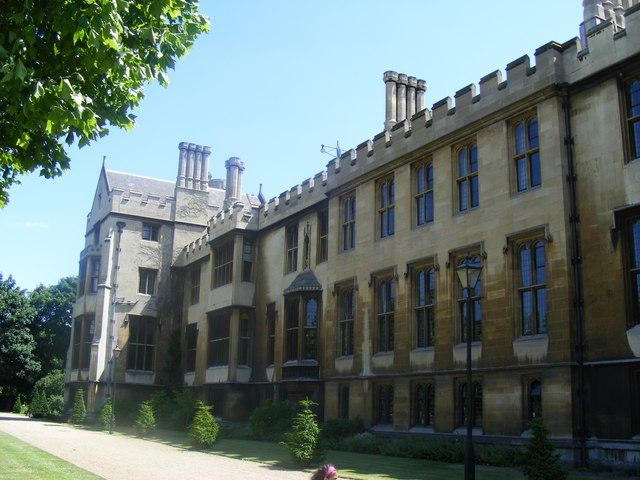
The 19th-century range

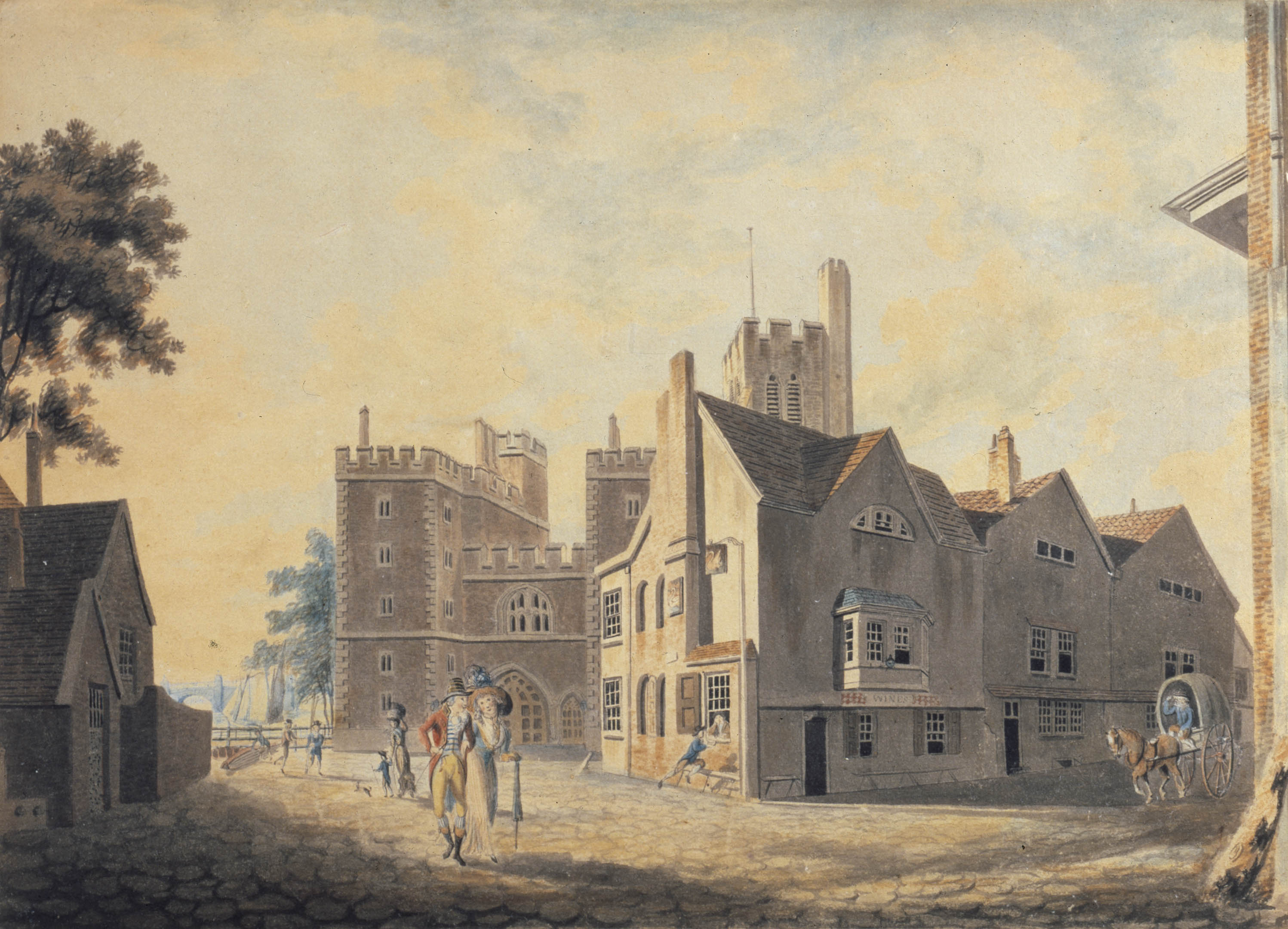
Lambeth Palace by J. M. W. Turner, 1790

== Garden ==
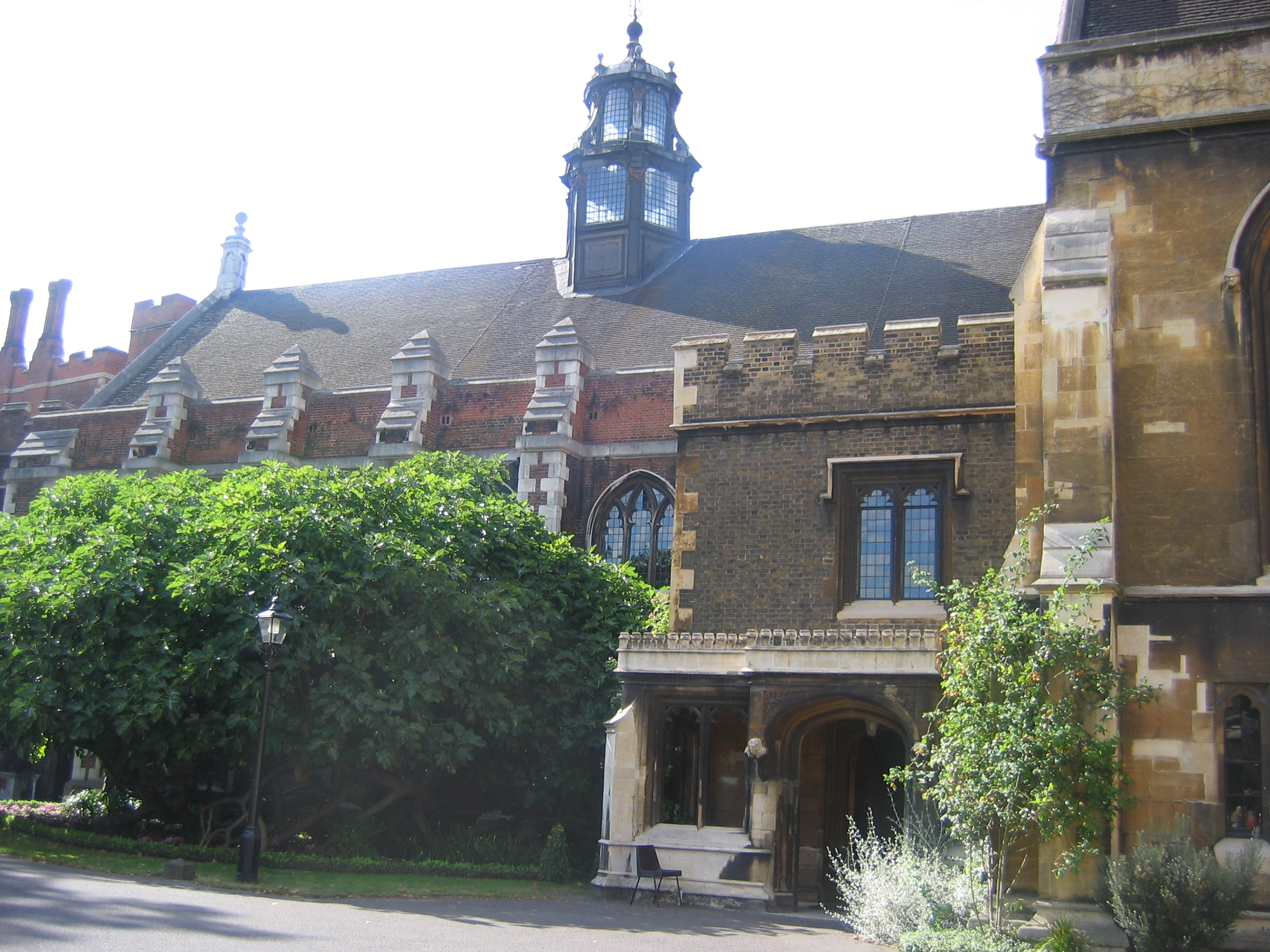
The great hall with Cardinal Pole's fig tree in front

Though most of the layout and planting visible today is of the 19th and 20th centuries, Lambeth Palace garden is the oldest continually cultivated garden in London.

The fig tree in the palace courtyard is possibly grown from a slip taken from one of the White Marseille fig trees here for centuries (reputedly planted by Cardinal Pole). In 1786, there were three ancient figs, two "nailed against the wall" and still noted in 1826 as "two uncommonly fine... traditionally reported to have been planted by Cardinal Pole, and fixed against that part of the palace believed to have been founded by him. They are of the white Marseilles sort, and still bear delicious fruit. ...On the south side of the building, in a small private garden, is another tree of the same kind and age." By 1882, their place had been taken by several massive offshoots. The notable orchard of the medieval period has mostly been replaced by Archbishop's Park, an adjoining public park now vested in the local authority. The palace gardens are listed grade II in October 1987.

== Lambeth Palace Library ==
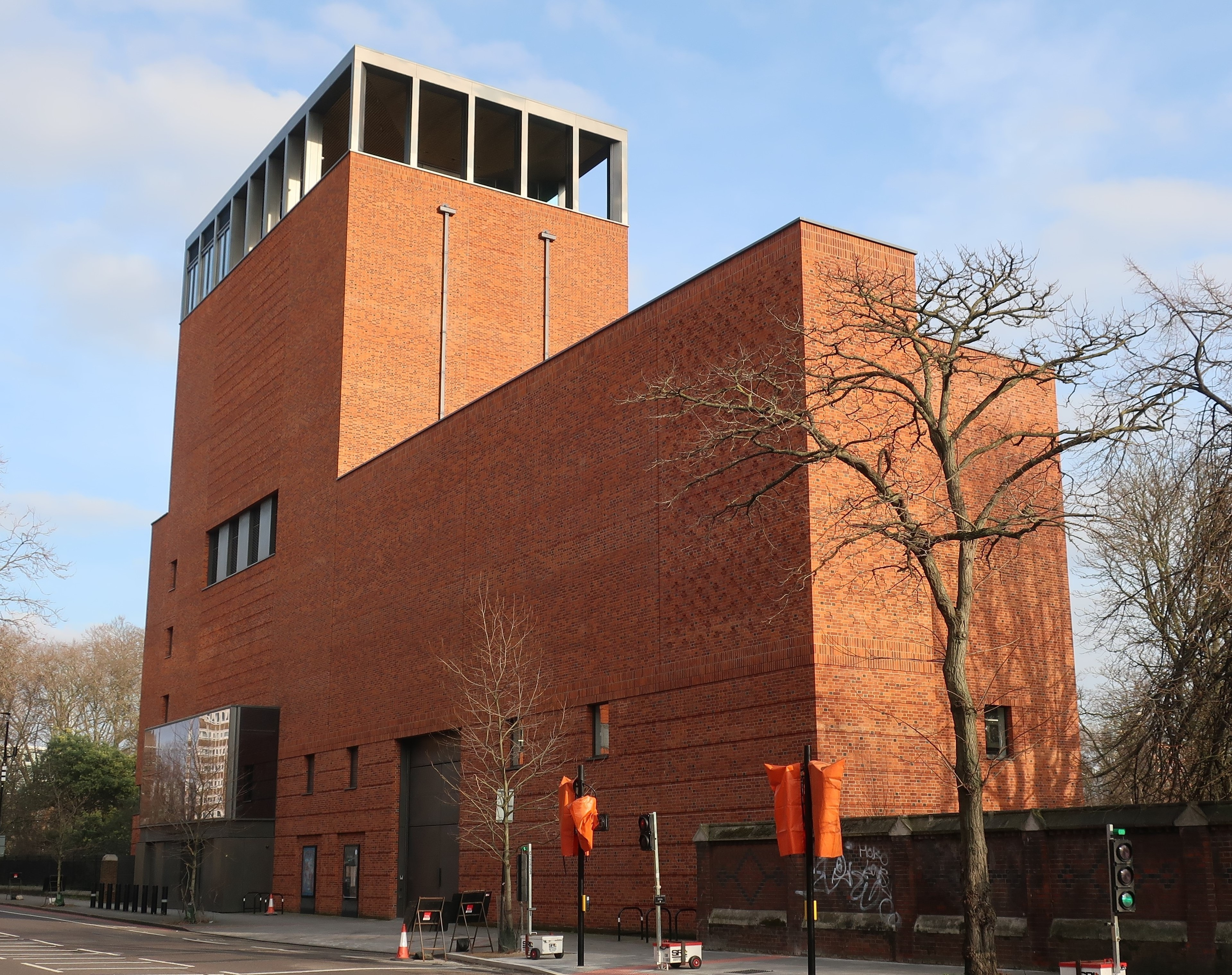
Lambeth Palace Library

Located within the palace gardens is Lambeth Palace Library, the official library of the archbishop of Canterbury and the principal repository of records of the Church of England. It describes itself as "the largest religious collection outside the Vatican".

The library was founded by Archbishop Richard Bancroft in 1610. It was historically housed within various rooms of the palace, but in 2021 a new purpose-built repository, reading room and conservation centre designed by Wright & Wright opened. This has a dedicated public entrance on Lambeth Palace Road. In addition to the archbishops' historic collections it houses the archival collections of Church of England institutions formerly held at the Church of England Record Centre (opened 1989) in Bermondsey. In 1996, when Sion College closed, Lambeth Palace Library acquired its important holdings of manuscripts, pamphlets, and pre-1850 printed books.

The library has extensive holdings relating to ecclesiastical history, including the archives of the archbishops dating back to the 12th century; records of other church bodies and of various Anglican missionary and charitable societies; manuscripts including items dating back to the 9th century; and more than 120,000 printed books. Areas covered by the collections range from the history of art and architecture to colonial and Commonwealth history, and numerous aspects of English social, political and economic history. The library is also an important resource for local history and genealogy.

The collection is available to researchers at the on-site reading rooms. For online catalogues, see External links below.

=== Highlights of the collection ===
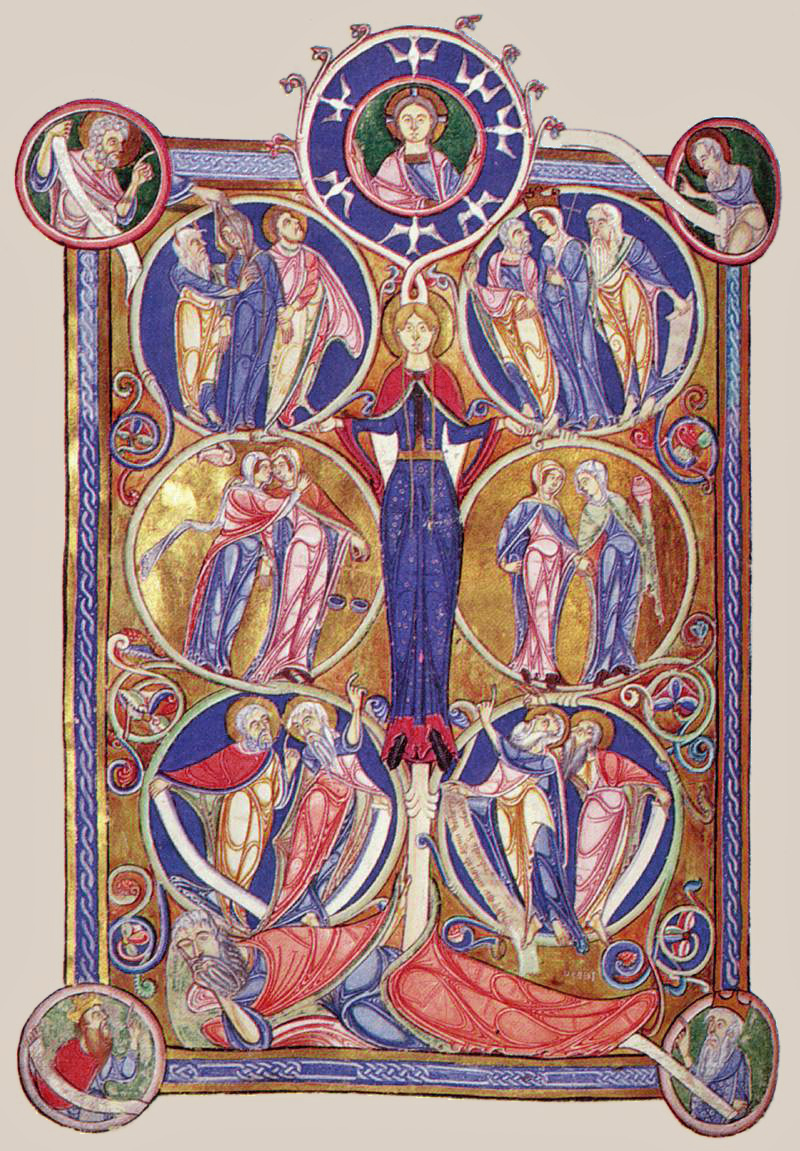
Illumination of the Tree of Jesse from the 12th-century Lambeth Bible

Notable items in the collections include:

- Mac Durnan Gospels (late 9th/early 10th centuries)
- Minuscule 473 (11th century)
- Minuscule 559 (11th century)
- Lambeth Apocalypse (12th century)
- The Romanesque Lambeth Bible (12th century)
- Lambeth Homilies (c. 1200)
- Book of Hours of King Richard III (mid 15th century)
- A Short English Chronicle (mid 15th century)
- A rare copy of the Gutenberg Bible (1450s)
- Lambeth Choirbook (16th century)
- Book of Howth (late 16th century)
- Archives of the Commission for Building Fifty New Churches (1711–1759)
- Archives of the Incorporated Church Building Society (1818–1982)

== St Mary-at-Lambeth ==
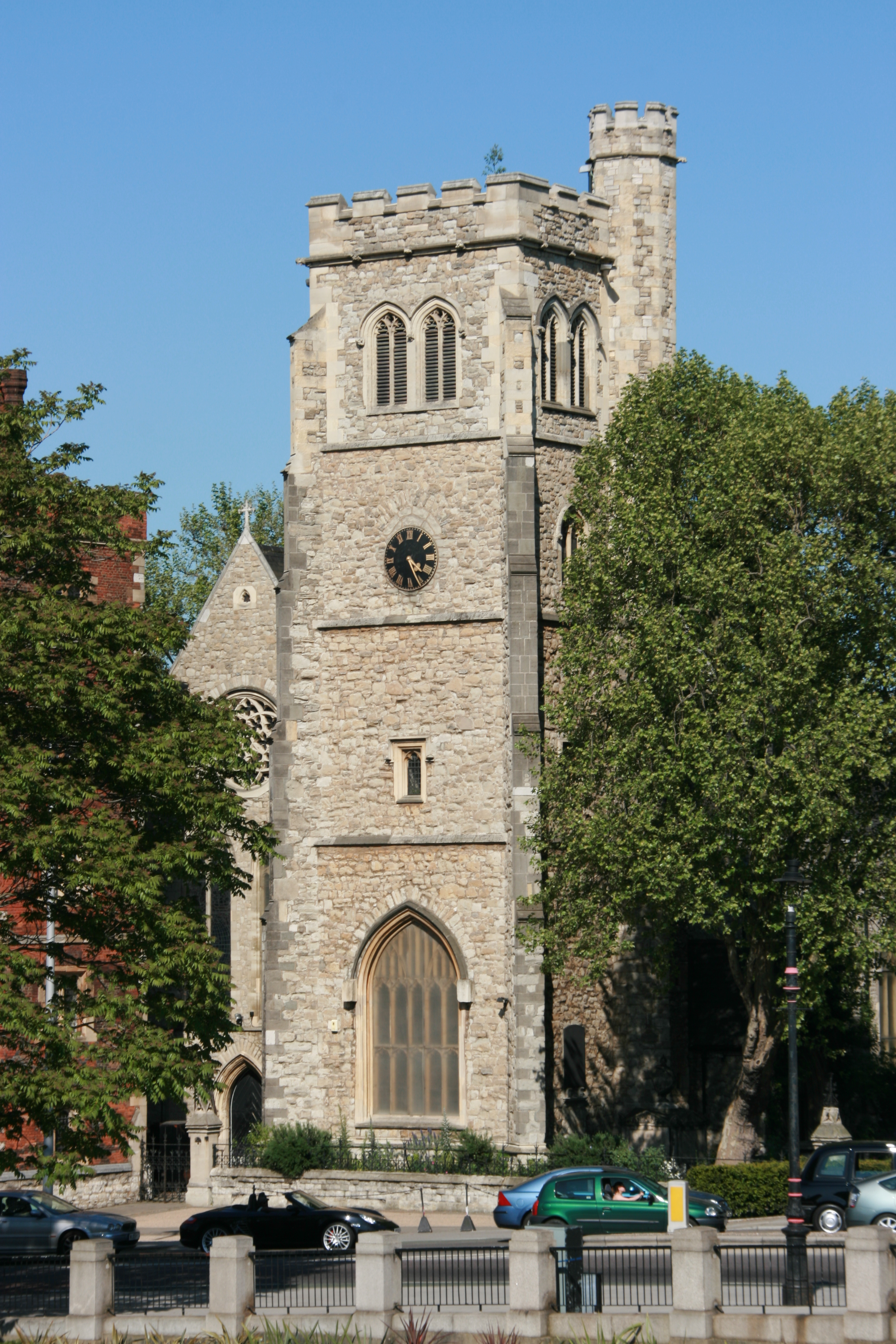
Tower of St Mary-at-Lambeth, now home to the Garden Museum

Immediately outside the gatehouse stands the former parish church of St Mary-at-Lambeth. The tower dates from 1377 (repaired in 1834); while the body of the church was rebuilt in 1851 to the designs of Philip Hardwick. Older monuments were preserved, including the tombs of the gardeners and plantsmen John Tradescant the elder and his son of the same name, and of Admiral William Bligh.

St Mary's was deconsecrated in 1972, when the parish was absorbed into the surrounding parish of North Lambeth which has three active churches, the nearest being St Anselm's Church, Kennington Cross. St Mary's was scheduled for demolition, but was saved following a campaign led by John and Rosemary Nicholson, and focused on its Tradescant associations. The Nicholsons founded the Museum of Garden History (now the Garden Museum), which opened in the building in 1977.

During renovation works in 2016, a previously unknown crypt was discovered, containing 30 coffins. Amongst these were those of five archbishops of Canterbury—Richard Bancroft, Thomas Tenison, Matthew Hutton, Frederick Cornwallis, and John Moore—as well as that of John Bettesworth, Dean of the Arches.

== Resident community ==
Lambeth Palace is home to the Community of Saint Anselm, an Anglican religious order that is under the patronage of the archbishop of Canterbury.

== See also ==
- List of palaces
- Old Palace, Canterbury, within the precincts of Canterbury Cathedral, is the residence of the archbishop when in Canterbury
- Palace of Whitehall

== Bibliography ==
- Dodwell, C. R. (1958). Lambeth Palace. London: Country Life.
- Palmer, Richard; Brown, Michelle P., eds. (2010). Lambeth Palace Library: Treasures from the Collections of the Archbishops of Canterbury. London: Scala. ISBN 9781857596274.
- Stourton, James (2012). Great Houses of London. London: Frances Lincoln. ISBN 978-0-7112-3366-9.
- Tatton-Brown, Tim (2000). Lambeth Palace: A History of the Archbishops of Canterbury and Their Houses. London: SPCK. ISBN 0-281-05347-2.
