= John Tradescant =

John Tradescant may refer to:

- John Tradescant the elder (1570s–1638)
- his son John Tradescant the younger (1608–1662)
