= Old Paradise Gardens =

Park in London

Coordinates: 51°29′36″N 0°07′08″W

Old Paradise Gardens (formerly known as Lambeth High Street Recreation Ground, and informally as the Rec) is a 0.76 hectares (1.9 acres) park in Lambeth in the London Borough of Lambeth in London, England, and opened to the public in 1884. Before it became a park, it was a burial ground of St. Mary's Church, Lambeth from 1703 to 1853.

== Burial ground ==
By the early 18th century the churchyard of St Mary's, Lambeth was full. In order to provide an alternate burial ground for the parish, Archbishop Tenison acquired a market garden in 1703 for the sum of £120. It was consecrated in 1705. It was extended in 1814, and the extension was consecrated in 1816. A watch house was erected in 1825. The burial ground closed in 1853.

== Public garden ==
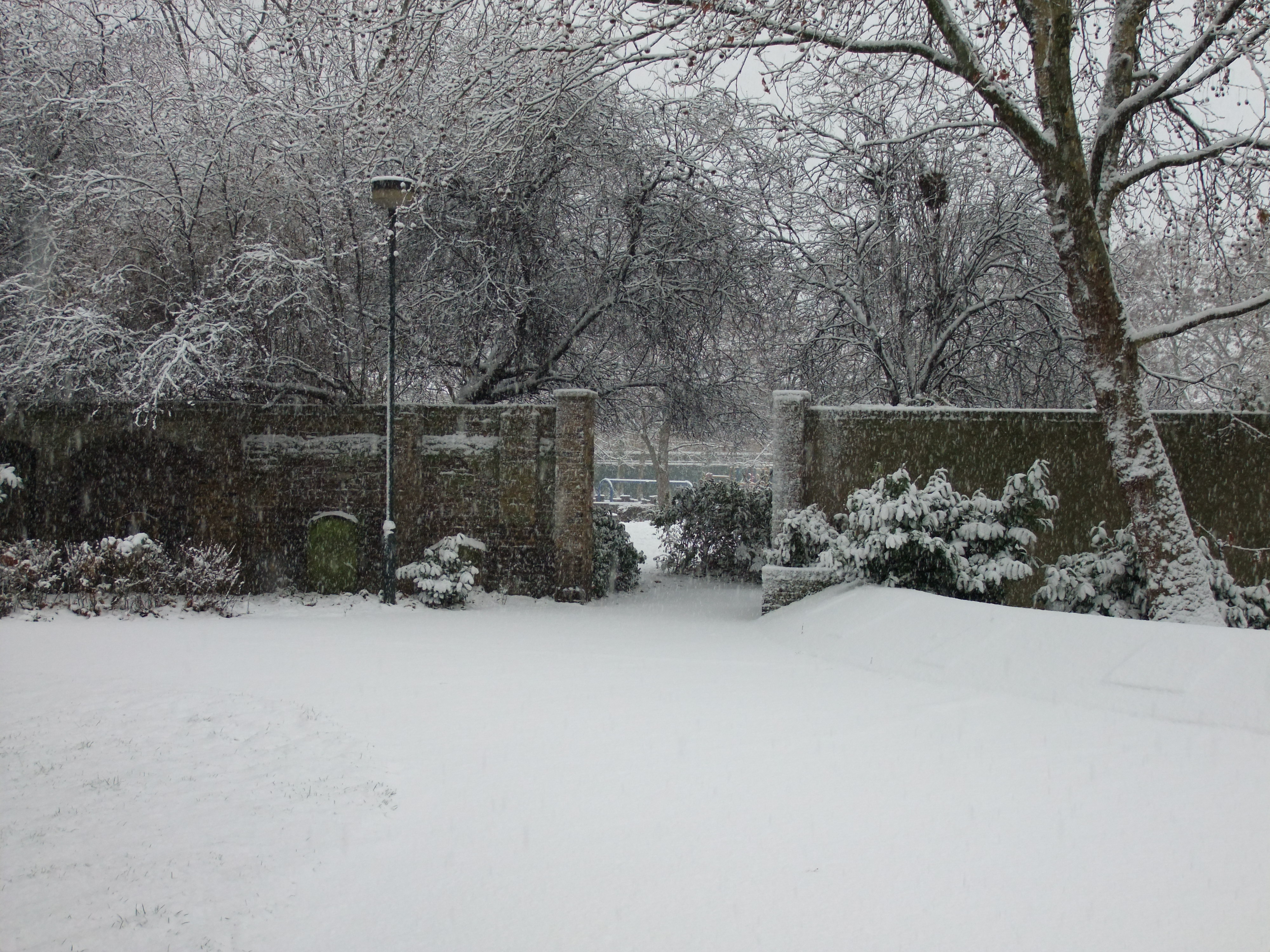
Lambeth High Street Recreation Ground in the snow, 2010

By 1880 the former burial ground was unsightly, and the Lambeth vestry decided to turn it into a public garden, which opened in 1884. In 1929 the recreation ground was extended with the acquisition of the site of a glass bottle factory in Whitgift Street. However, by the 1970s the recreation ground had been allowed to deteriorate, and had been largely asphalted over. It has subsequently been restored, and re-landscaped with grassy mounds, a water feature, seating and shrubs and spring bulbs planted. Spring bulbs were donated by the Metropolitan Public Gardens Association.

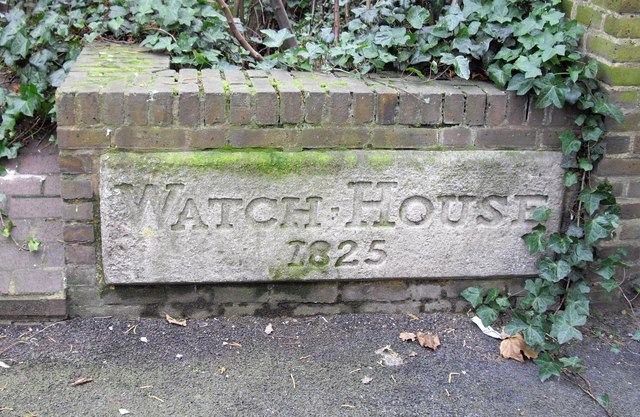
Plaque commemorating the former watch house

The former watch house is commemorated with a plaque. There were mortuary buildings in the north east corner, which were removed at the time of the restoration in the 1970s.

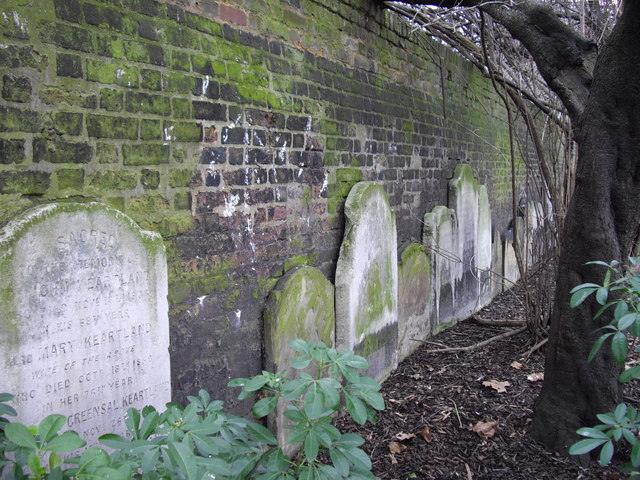
Gravestones around the perimeter of the walls of the gardens

Gravestones are located around the perimeter of the walls of the gardens; the walls themselves are Grade II listed, and were on the Heritage at Risk Register. Following restoration work in 2021, they have been removed from the register.

In 2013 the park was again refurbished, with new entrance gates, and renamed Old Paradise Gardens.

The Garden Museum run weekly gardening sessions for local residents in the gardens. Future proposals include establishing a cut-flower business, in order to provide revenue for maintenance. Other proposals include wildflower planting to match that at the Garden Museum.
