= Joy Larkcom =

British vegetable grower and writer

Joy Larkcom is a British vegetable grower and gardening writer, known for books including Grow Your Own Vegetables and Creative Vegetable Gardening, and a campaigner for organic gardening.

== Biography ==
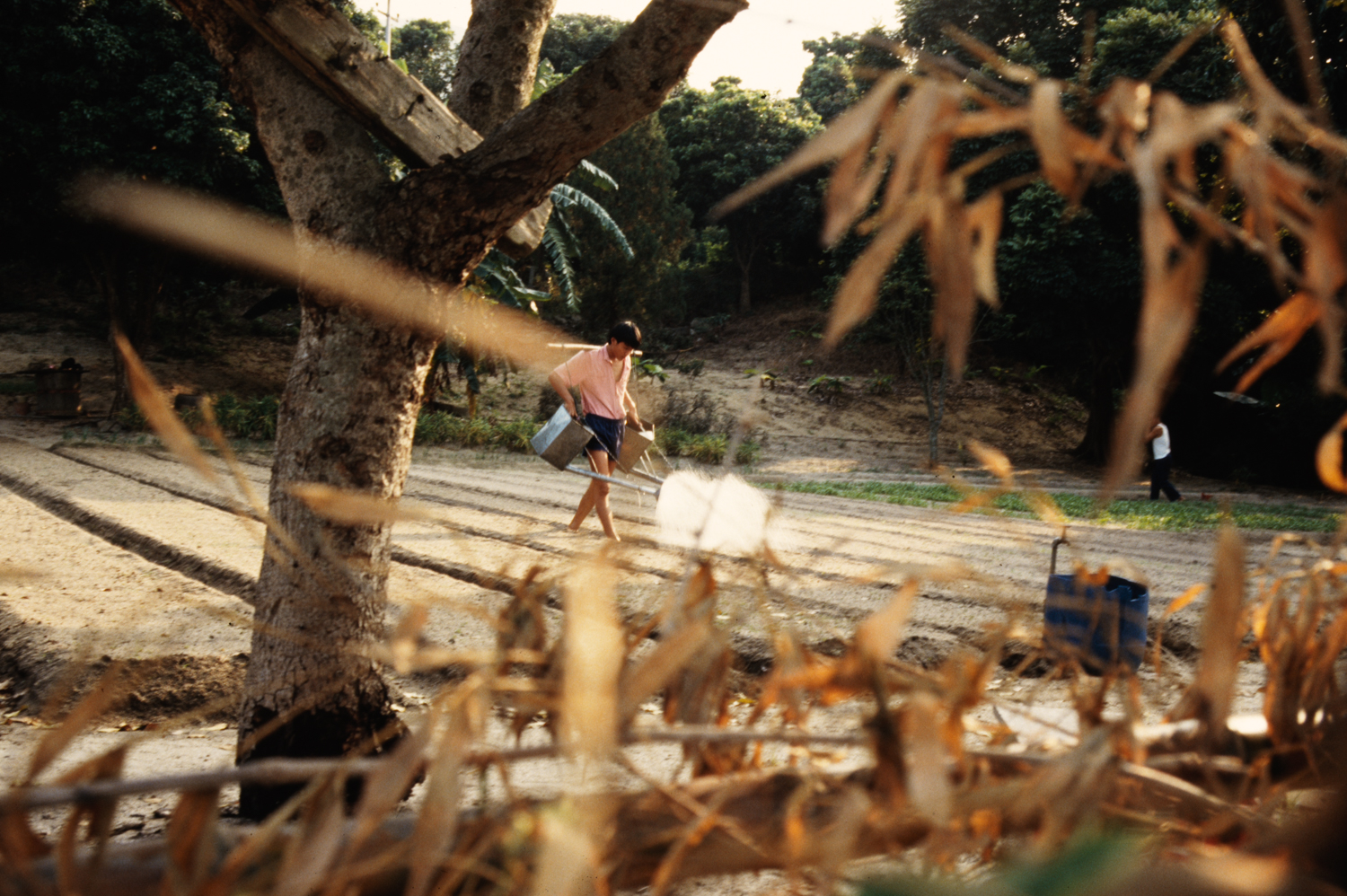
A farmer watering the field on the Lantau Island, Photographic slide by Joy Larkcom 1985

In 1976-1977 she and her husband Don, with their two small children, spent a year touring Europe looking at vegetable growing methods, on what she called "The Grand Vegetable Tour". In 1985 she spent five weeks touring China, where she had lived for two and a half years as a child, to study vegetable growing and seed production. The resulting book was Oriental Vegetables, published in 1991. She grew vegetables for many years on a smallholding in Suffolk, and then retired to West Cork, Ireland, where she has a coastal garden. She has been a regular contributor to publications including The Observer, Kitchen Garden magazine and Organic Gardening magazine, and has been called "the queen of vegetable growing".

When invited to name two UK gardens she admired, she chose Barnsley House in Gloucestershire, with whose owner Rosemary Verey she had worked on the "1,000 Years of Gardening" exhibition at the Victoria and Albert Museum, and the Garden of Cosmic Speculation in Dumfriesshire which she described as "mind-blowing".

== Recognition and awards ==
A photographic portrait of Larkcom by Tessa Traeger is held by the National Portrait Gallery.

In 1993 she was awarded the Royal Horticultural Society's Veitch Memorial Medal, and in 2003 a Lifetime Achievement Award by the Garden Writers' Guild (now the Garden Media Guild).

Larkcom's archives are being prepared for the Garden Museum in London.

== Selected publications ==
- Vegetables from Small Gardens (1976)
- Salads the Year Round (1980), revised as Salads from Small Gardens (1995)
- The Vegetable Garden Displayed (1982, revised 1994)
- Sainsbury's Homebase Guide to Vegetable Gardening (1983)
- Observer Good Gardening Guide (1983)
- The Salad Garden (1984, revised 2001)
- Oriental Vegetables (1991)
- Grow Your Greens, Eat Your Greens (1993)
- Creative Vegetable Gardening (1997; reprinted 2008, Mitchell Beazley: ISBN 978-1845333904)
- Grown Your Own Vegetables (2002 revised ed, Frances Lincoln: ISBN 978-0711219632)
- Just Vegetating: A Memoir (2012, Francs Lincoln: ISBN 978-0711229358)
