= Archbishop's Park =

Park in London

Coordinates: 51.497°N 0.116°W

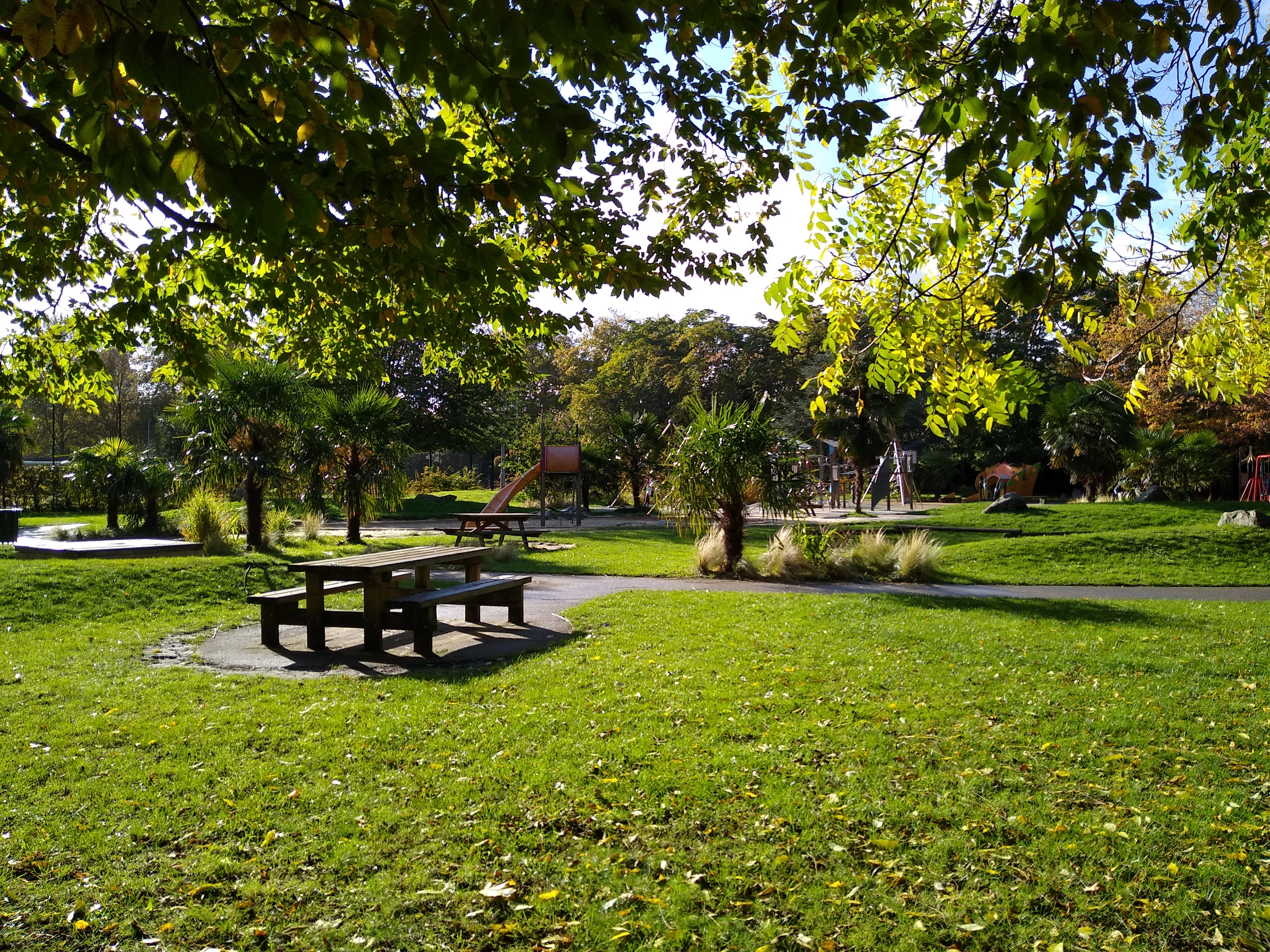
Archbishop's Park

Archbishop's Park is a 3.93 hectares (9.7 acres) park in Lambeth in the London Borough of Lambeth in London, England, which opened to the public in 1901. Before it became a park, it formed part of the grounds of Lambeth Palace.

== History ==
Lambeth Palace has been the London residence of the Archbishops of Canterbury since the 13th-century. The Bishop of Carlisle held adjacent land that was then incorporated into Lambeth Palace. Archibald Campbell Tait became Archbishop in 1869; he was greatly concerned about the welfare of the poor in London, and opened some 9 acres of the palace gardens (being the land formerly owned by the Bishop of Carlisle) for the benefit of the local poor. That area of land became known as Lambeth Palace Field. It continued to be used by the public after Tait's death in 1882, but without any permanent rights to do so. A permanent public park was first proposed in 1898 by Lt-Col Charles Ford, a Progressive member of the London County Council (1892–1901). In 1900 the Metropolitan Public Gardens Association then led a campaign for the permanent and unrestricted opening of Lambeth Palace Field. This was successful, and Archbishop's Park was laid out with lawns, a playground and sports fields, surrounded by boundary trees, and was opened in 1901.

The London County Council erected a large wooden shelter at the southern end of the park before WWII. This survived the War, but by the 21st-century had become run-down, and was restored in 2011. There is a fountain, which was restored between 2006 and 2011, with mosaics inlaid by the London School of Mosaic.

== Features ==
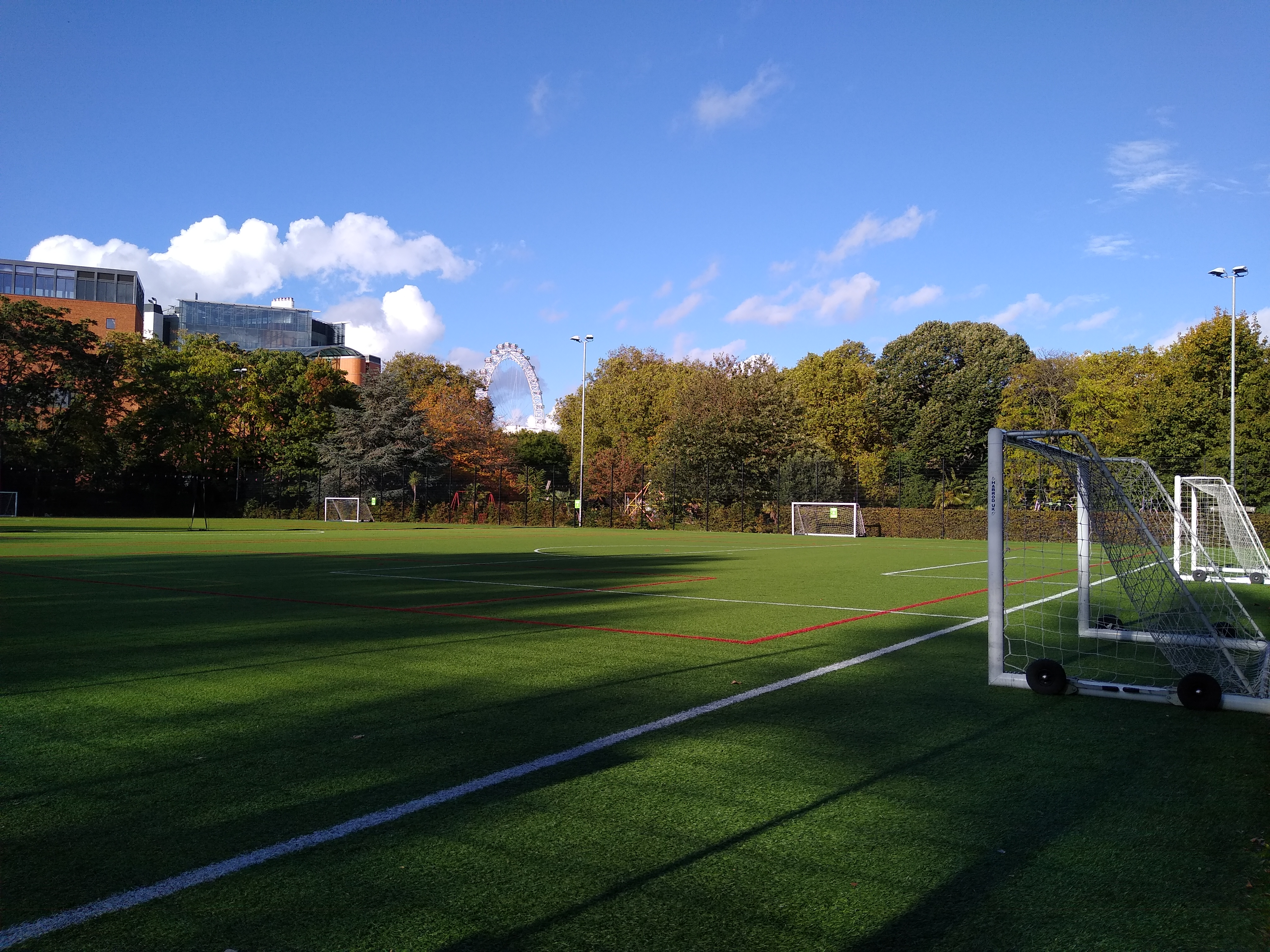
Football pitch

The park features two 7 a-side and three 5 a-side football pitches, one multi-use sports area for tennis and netball, two tennis courts, and three cricket nets. A zip wire was erected in the park each summer from 2017 to 2019.

A community orchard was established in 2010, and a garden has been laid out in the northern part of the park as a memorial to Octavia Hill, one of the founders of the National Trust. The Octavia Hill garden was launched by the botanist David Bellamy in 2005.

A statue, symbolising human kindness, sculpted by Jessica Wetherly, was installed in 2016.

There is a Friends of Archbishop's Park group.
