= Musaeum Tradescantianum =

Former public museum in London, the first in England

Coordinates: 51.4784°N 0.1231°W

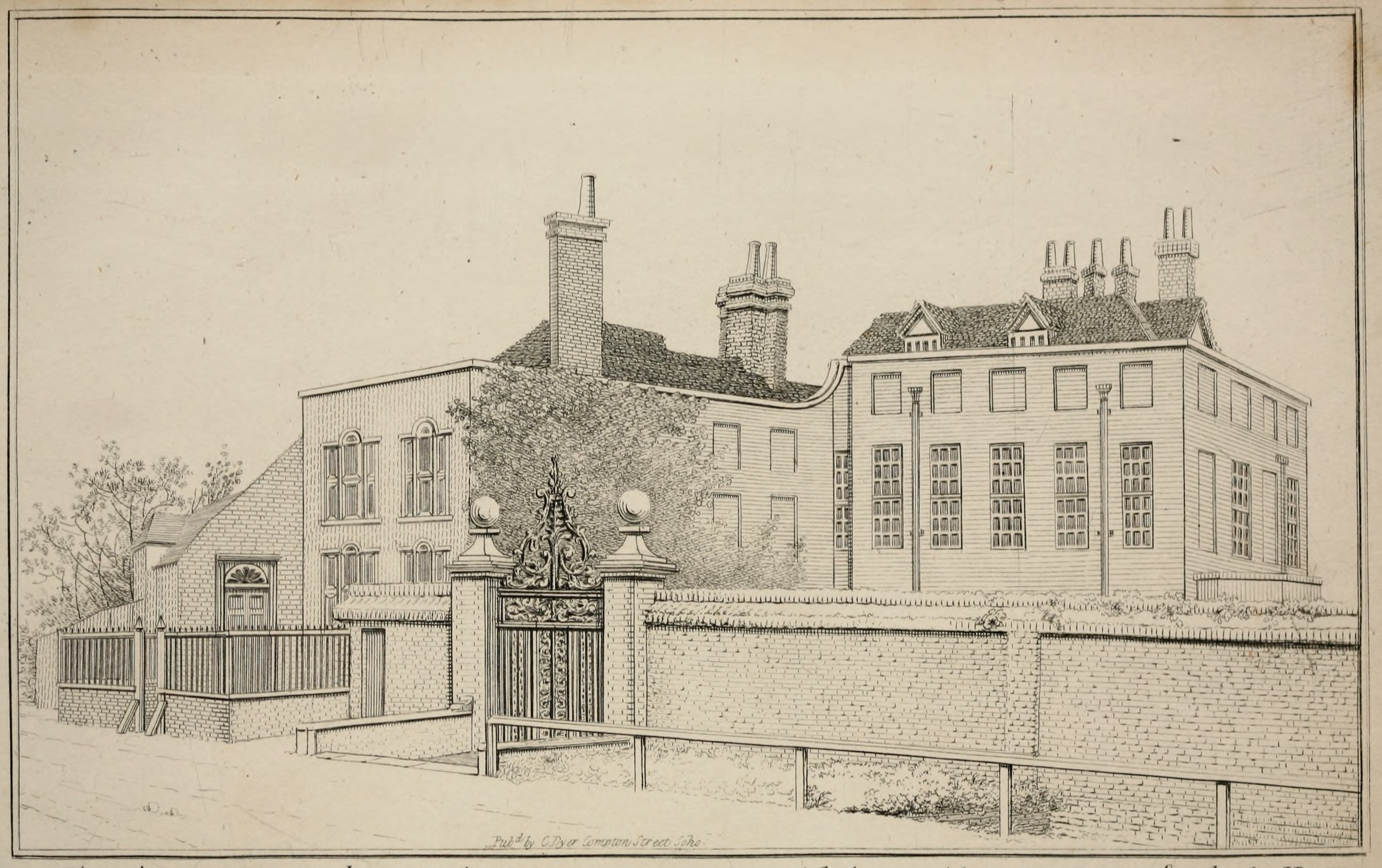
Tradescant's Ark

The Musaeum Tradescantianum was the first museum open to the public to be established in England. Located in South Lambeth, London, it comprised a collection of curiosities assembled by John Tradescant the elder and his son in a building called The Ark, and a botanical collection in the grounds of the building. Turret House, the family home, was demolished in 1881 and the estate has been redeveloped; the house stood on the site of the present Tradescant Road and Walberswick Street, off South Lambeth Road.

Tradescant divided the exhibits into natural objects (naturalia) and manmade objects (artificialia). The first account of the collection, by Peter Mundy, is from 1634. After the death of the younger Tradescant and his wife, the collection passed into the hands of the wealthy collector Elias Ashmole, who in 1691 gave it to Oxford University as the nucleus of the newly founded Ashmolean Museum.

The Tradescant collection is the earliest major English cabinet of curiosities. Other famous collections in Europe preceded it, for example Emperor Rudolf II's Kunst- und Wunderkammer was well established at Prague by the end of the 16th century. In 2015 the Garden Museum received a £3.5 million Heritage Lottery grant to recreate a part of the original Ark with loans from the Ashmolean Museum

== See also ==
- "The New Museum Idea"
