= Garden Museum =

Museum in London, formerly the church of St Mary-at-Lambeth

Coordinates: 51.4950°N 0.1202°W

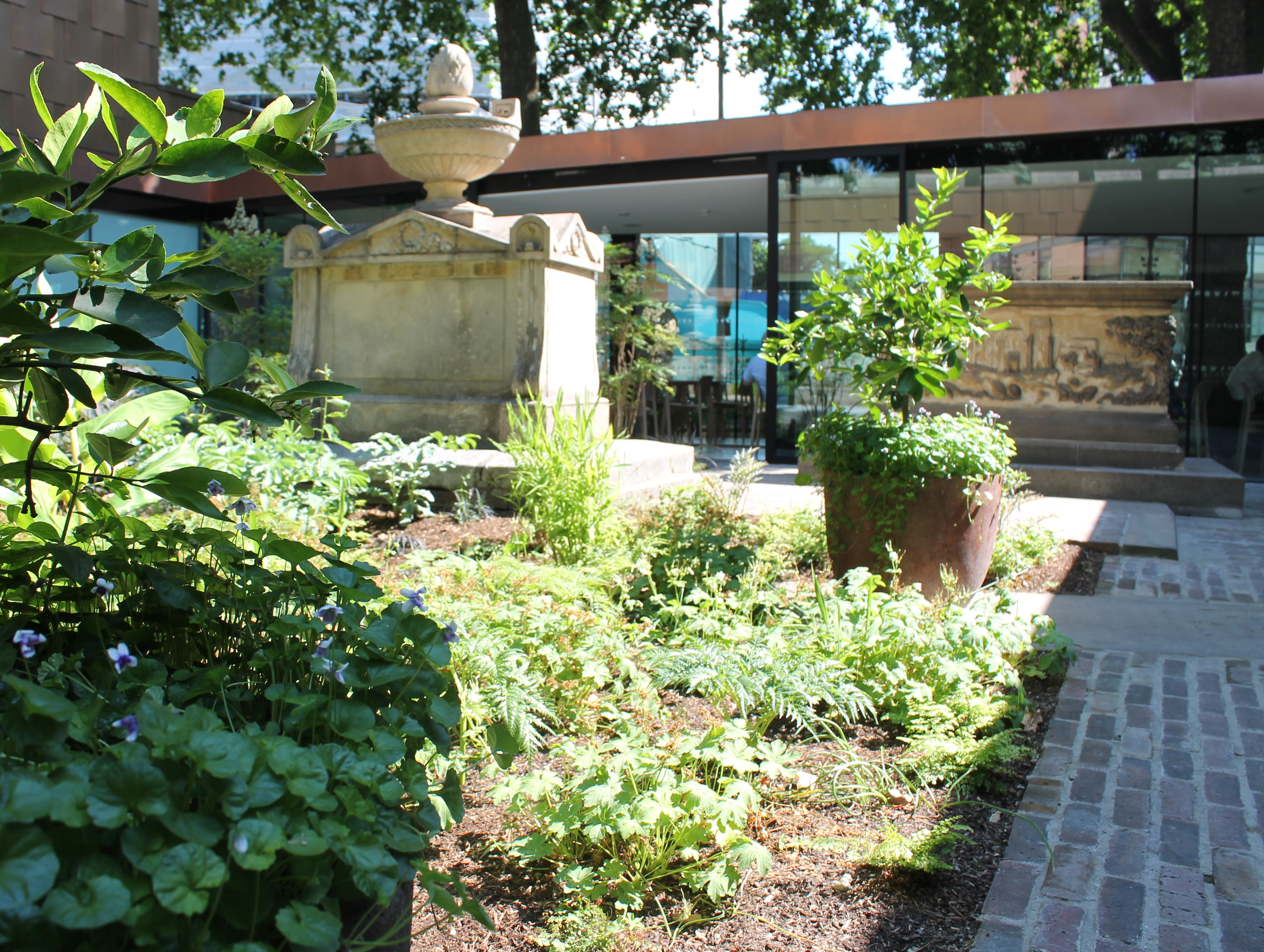
The Sackler Garden, designed by Dan Pearson as part of the redevelopment project. It contains the tombs of Vice-Admiral of the Blue William Bligh (left) and the Tradescants (right)

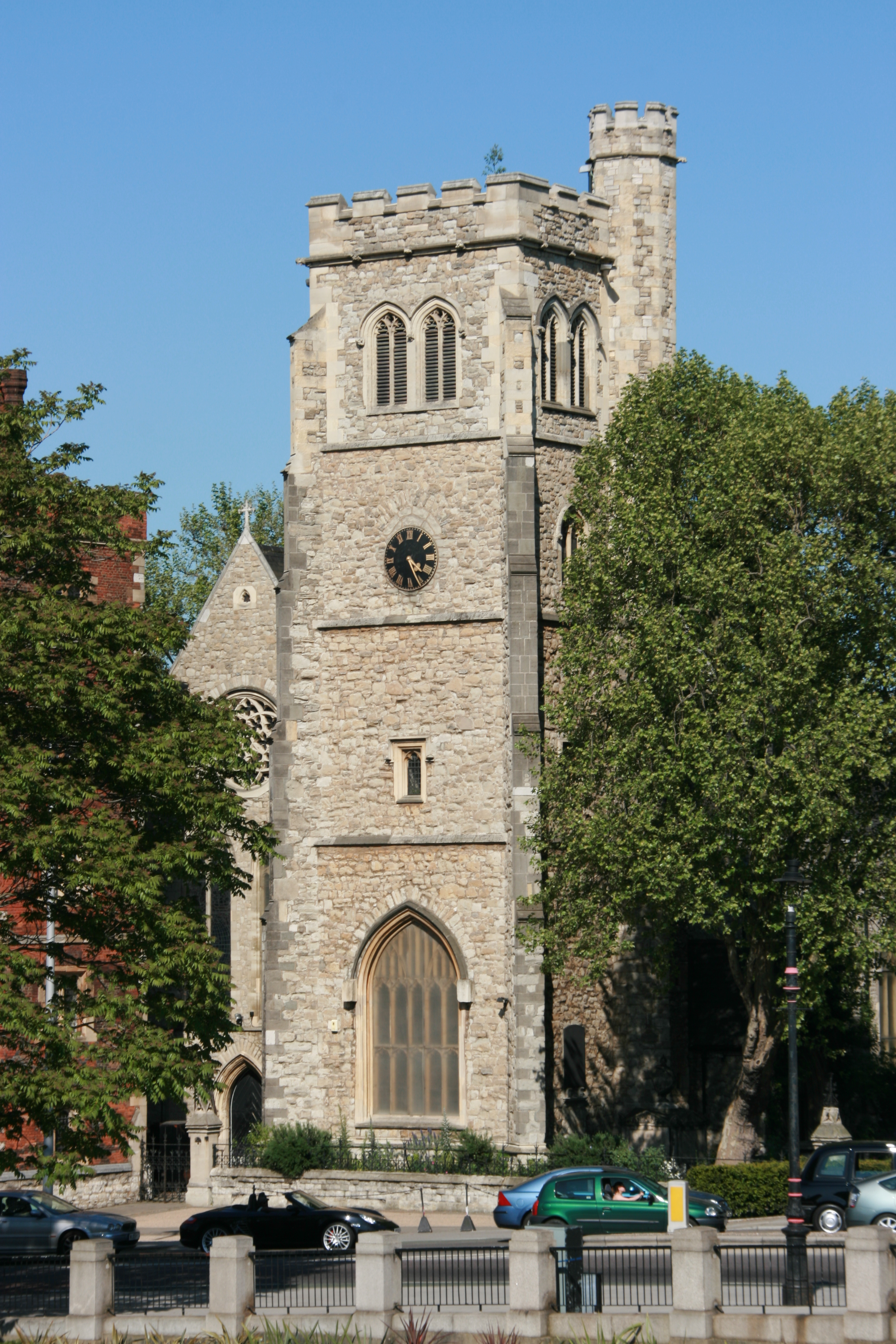
The Garden Museum is housed in the former church of St Mary-at-Lambeth, overlooking the River Thames

The Garden Museum (formerly known as the Museum of Garden History) in London is Britain's only museum of the art, history and design of gardens. The museum re-opened in 2017 after an 18-month redevelopment project.

The building is largely the Victorian reconstruction of the Church of St Mary-at-Lambeth which was deconsecrated in 1972 and was scheduled to be demolished. It is adjacent to Lambeth Palace on the south bank of the River Thames in London, on Lambeth Road. In 1976, John and Rosemary Nicholson traced the tomb of the two 17th-century royal gardeners and plant hunters John Tradescant the Elder and the Younger to the churchyard, and were inspired to create the Museum of Garden History. It was the first museum in the world dedicated to the history of gardening.

In 2019, the Museum opened an Archive of Garden Design to provide access to the records of leading British garden designers, together with the writers and photographers who have interpreted their work. The collection began with the archives of Penelope Hobhouse, Beth Chatto, John Brookes, Russell Page and Janet Jack, and has since been added to with archives of writers Joy Larkcom, Alan Titchmarsh and Paul Miles, as well as horticultural suppliers.

The museum's main gallery is on the first floor, in the body of the church. The collection includes tools, art, and ephemera of gardening, including a gallery about garden design and the evolution of gardening, as well as a recreation of Tradescant's 17th-century Ark. The collections give an insight into the social history of gardening as well as the practical aspects of the subject. There are three temporary exhibition spaces which look at various aspects of plants and gardens and change every six months The redevelopment of the museum, completed in 2017, included two new garden designs. The Sackler Garden, designed by Dan Pearson sits at the centre of the courtyard, replacing the knot garden, and the museum's front garden is designed by Christopher Bradley-Hole.

In 2006, Christopher Woodward, formerly director of the Holburne Museum in Bath, Somerset, was appointed as the director of the Garden Museum.

== Development of the museum ==
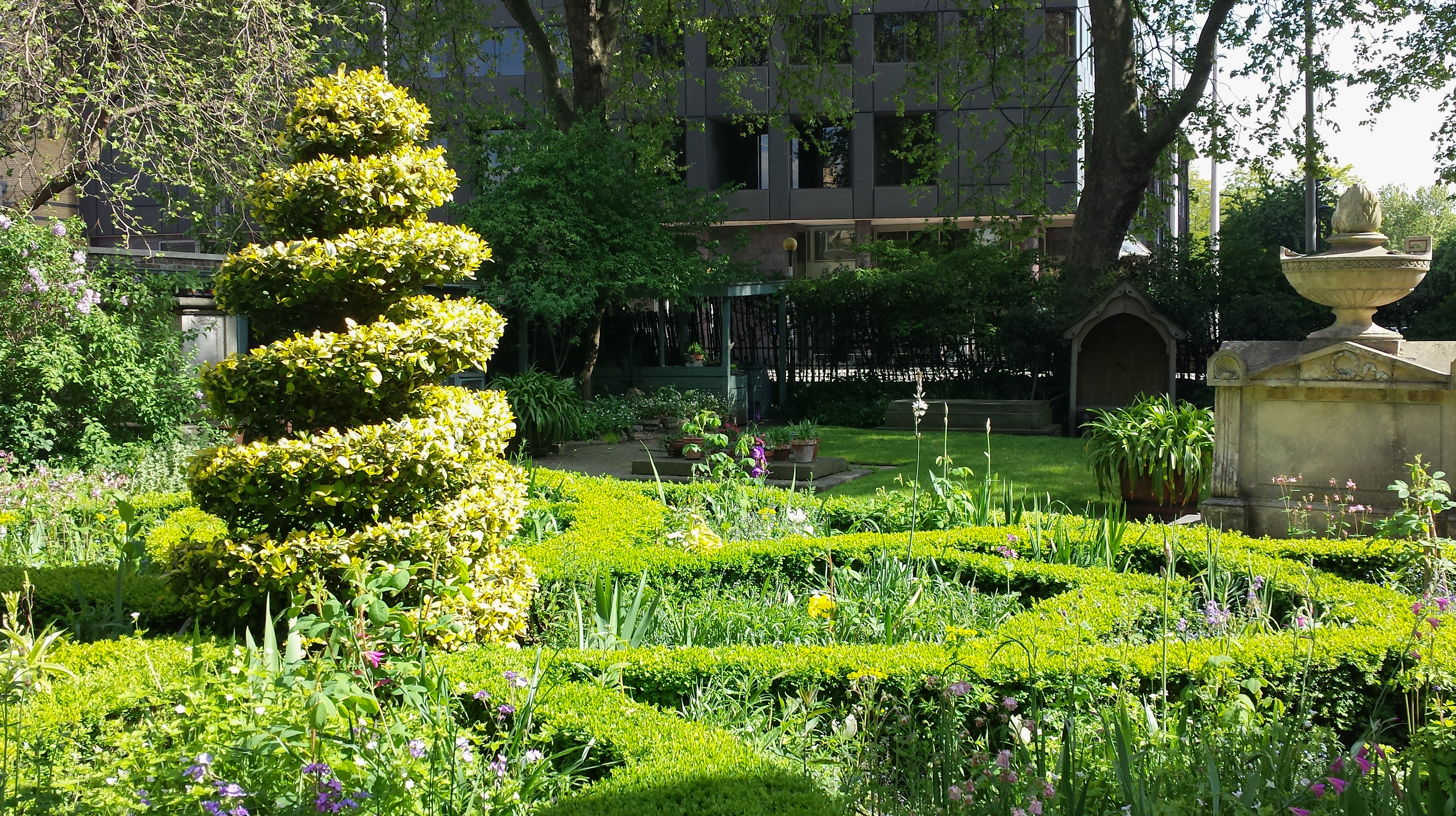
The knot garden at the museum in 2015

The museum is run as an independent registered charity and does not receive government funding, instead depending on Friends, Patrons and charitable trusts, in addition to income from admission and events. In 2002, its 25th anniversary year, the museum launched a campaign to raise at least £600,000 to pay for a general overhaul of its facilities.

=== Phase I (2008) ===
Following a design competition, in 2008, the museum's interior was transformed into a centre for exhibitions and events by the construction of contemporary gallery spaces; the work was designed by Dow Jones Architects. The renamed museum (now the Garden Museum) opened to the public on 18 November of that year.

=== Phase II (2015–2017) ===
From 2015 to 2017, the Museum undertook a second phase of work to complete the restoration of the ancient structure and its transformation into a museum. In 2014 the museum was awarded a grant of £3,510,600 from the Heritage Lottery Fund for the development. The redeveloped museum re-opened in 2017 with more galleries and spaces for education and events inserted into the historic interior in a second, award-winning design by Dow Jones Architects.

This phase doubled the space for display of the permanent collection, 95% of which was in store, and created extra space for schools and community outreach work, in addition to a bigger café and modern visitor services. At the core of the project was an aspiration to create the country's first archive of garden and landscape design which is open to the public on appointment. The museum now includes a recreation of "Tradescant's Ark" through the loan from the Ashmolean Museum of the objects which originally belonged in Tradescant's collection at Lambeth, later bequeathed to his neighbour, Elias Ashmole.

The redevelopment also included a viewing platform being lowered onto the medieval tower, allowing the public to access the tower and enjoy the view across the Thames to Westminster for the first time.

In 2020, Dan Pearson designed a new courtyard garden for Garden Museum; his inspiration for this garden came from a number of people who might be considered the modern-day equivalents of the Tradescants.

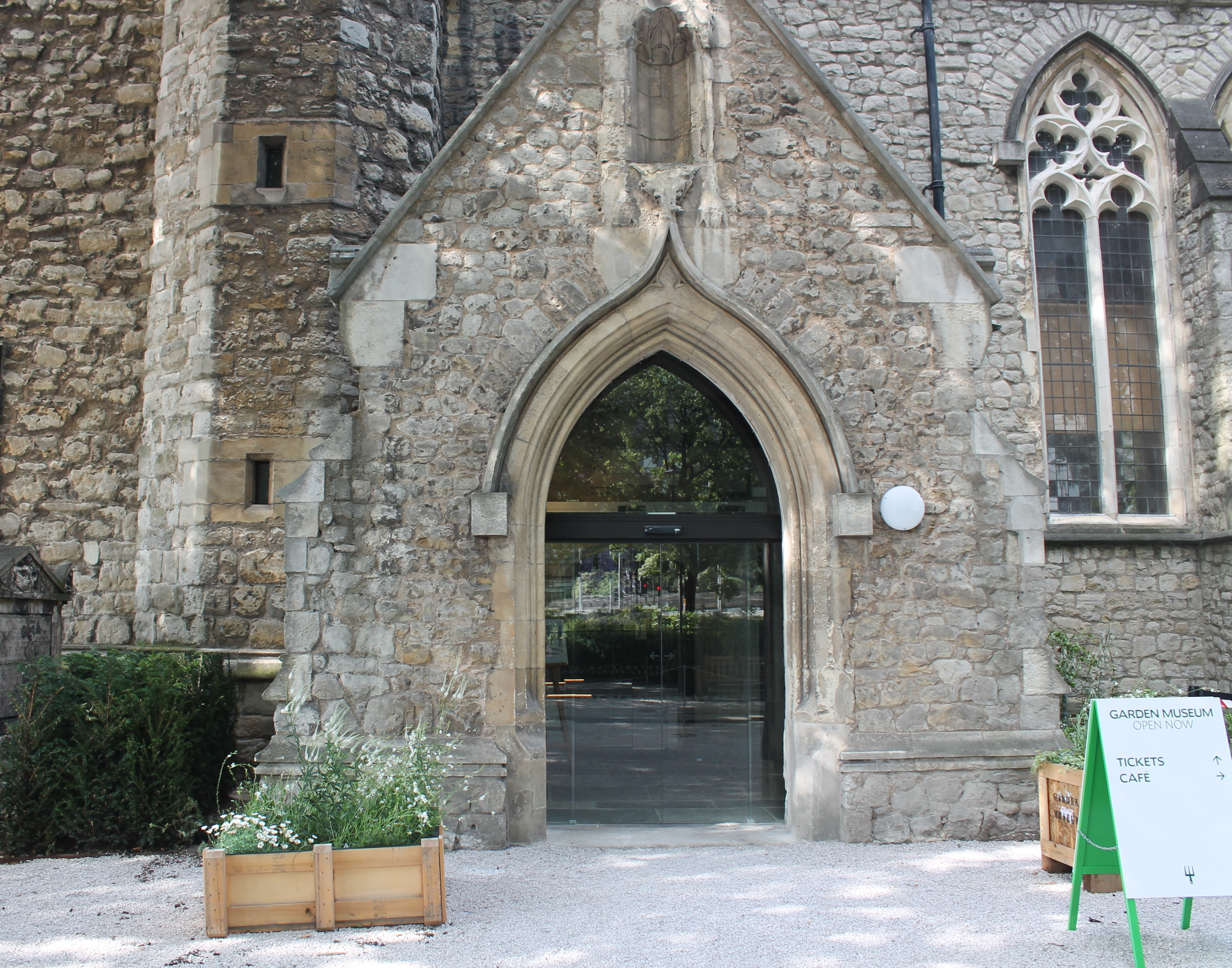
Entrance to the Garden Museum

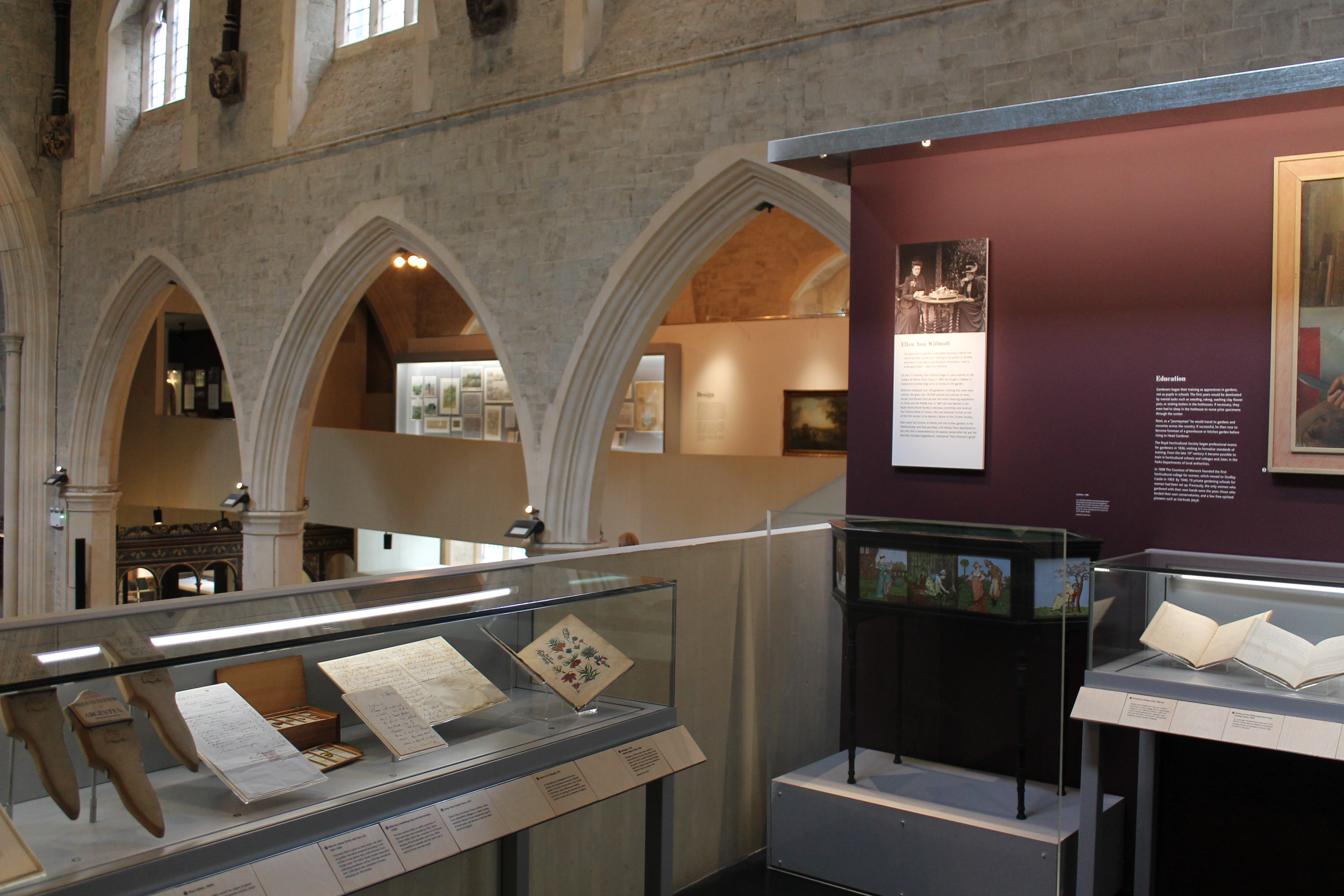
Part of the permanent gallery

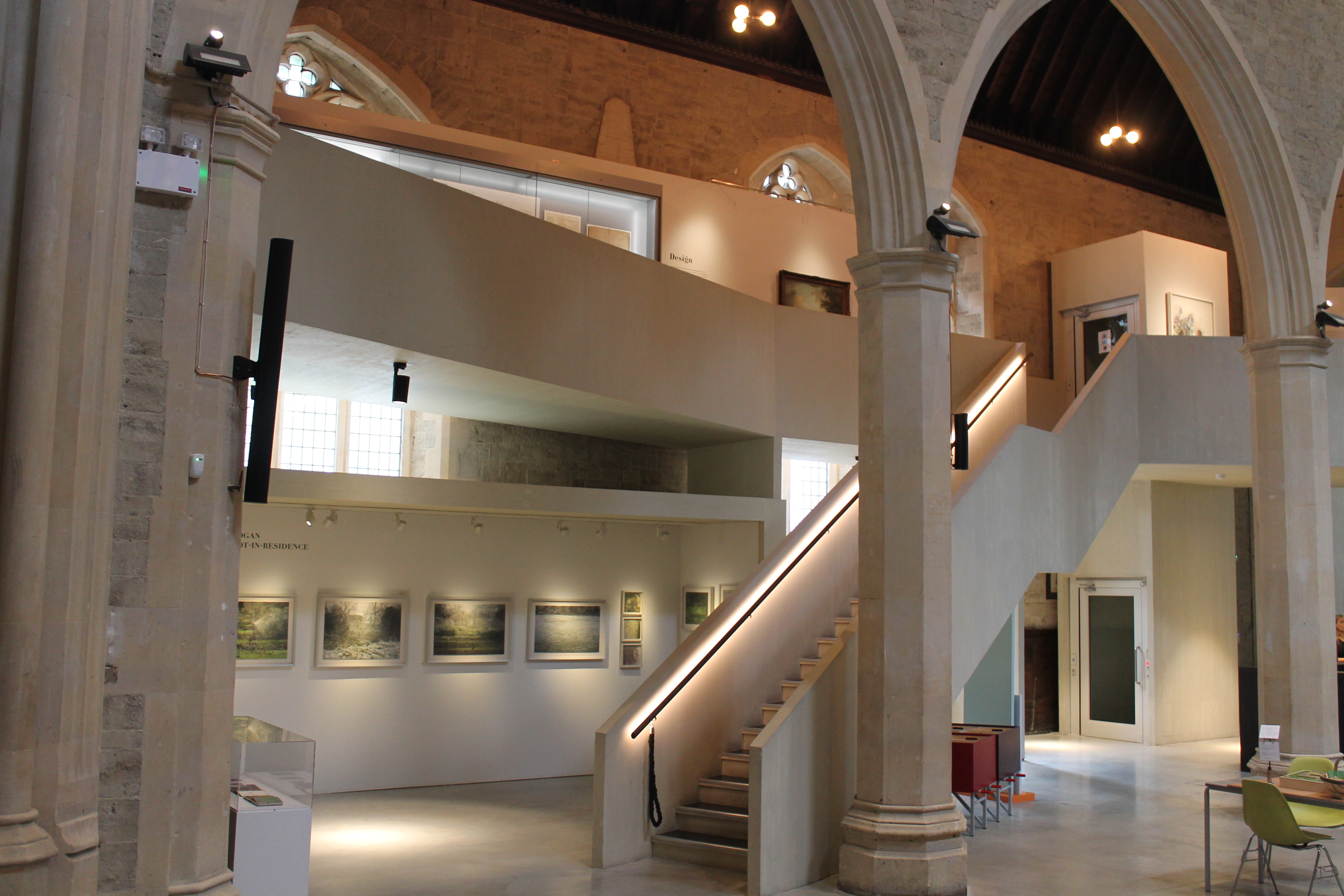
One of the temporary exhibition spaces

=== Lambeth Green (2018-present) ===
Since 2018, the Museum has been working with Transport for London and Lambeth Council on the Lambeth Green project which is intended to transform the public spaces near the museum. This includes building a new community garden in Old Paradise Gardens (Phase 1, completed 2023), a reshaped and greener road junction at Lambeth Bridge (Phase 2), and the re-design of St Mary’s Gardens to include a new single-story pavilion which is inter alia to be used for training apprentice gardeners (Phase 3).

=== Benton End (2021-present) ===
In 2021 the Pinchbeck Charitable Trust gifted Benton End a property in Hadleigh, Suffolk, to the Garden Museum with the intention that the house and garden might be restored and re-opened as a place of learning, art and horticulture, as it had been under the ownership of artist and gardener Sir Cedric Morris and his lifelong partner, artist, Arthur Lett-Haines who established the East Anglian School of Painting and Drawing.

Benton End's Walled Garden was restored and re-opened to visitors in 2026. The Garden Museum has launched Benton End Revived: a £5m capital project to repair, renovate, restore and adapt the house and wider grounds to become a cultural centre at the heart of the Brett Valley. The National Lottery Heritage Fund provided an initial grant of £294,221 in 2025.

== St Mary-at-Lambeth ==
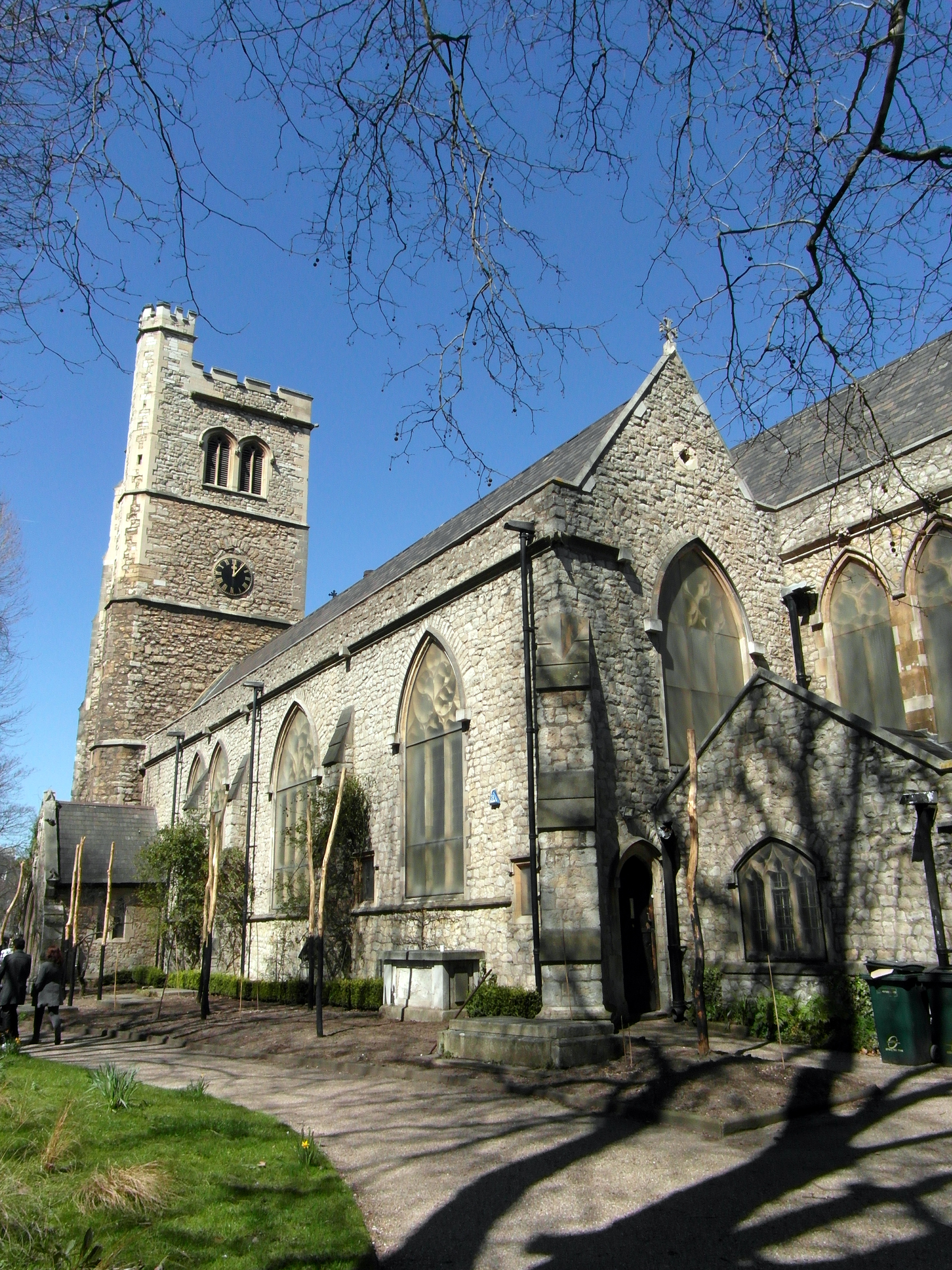
St Mary-at-Lambeth

The Garden Museum is housed in the medieval and Victorian church of St Mary-at-Lambeth. The first church on the site was built before the Norman Conquest, and was integral to the religious centre established by the Archbishops of Canterbury in the 12th century. The structure was deconsecrated in 1972, and rescued from demolition by the museum's founder, Rosemary Nicholson. The museum opened in 1977 as the world's first museum of garden history; the churchyard was re-designed as a garden.

The church is the oldest structure in the London Borough of Lambeth, except for the crypt of Lambeth Palace itself, and its burials and monuments are a record of 950 years of a community. But for the Palace, it has perhaps the richest historical story of any building in the borough. In 1062, a wooden church was built on the site by Goda, sister of Edward the Confessor; the Domesday Book of 1086 records 29 tenancies in her manor. Later in the century, it was rebuilt as a stone church and appears to have been at its height of splendour and patronage in the twelfth century, when it functioned as the church to the Archbishops' London lodgings next door.

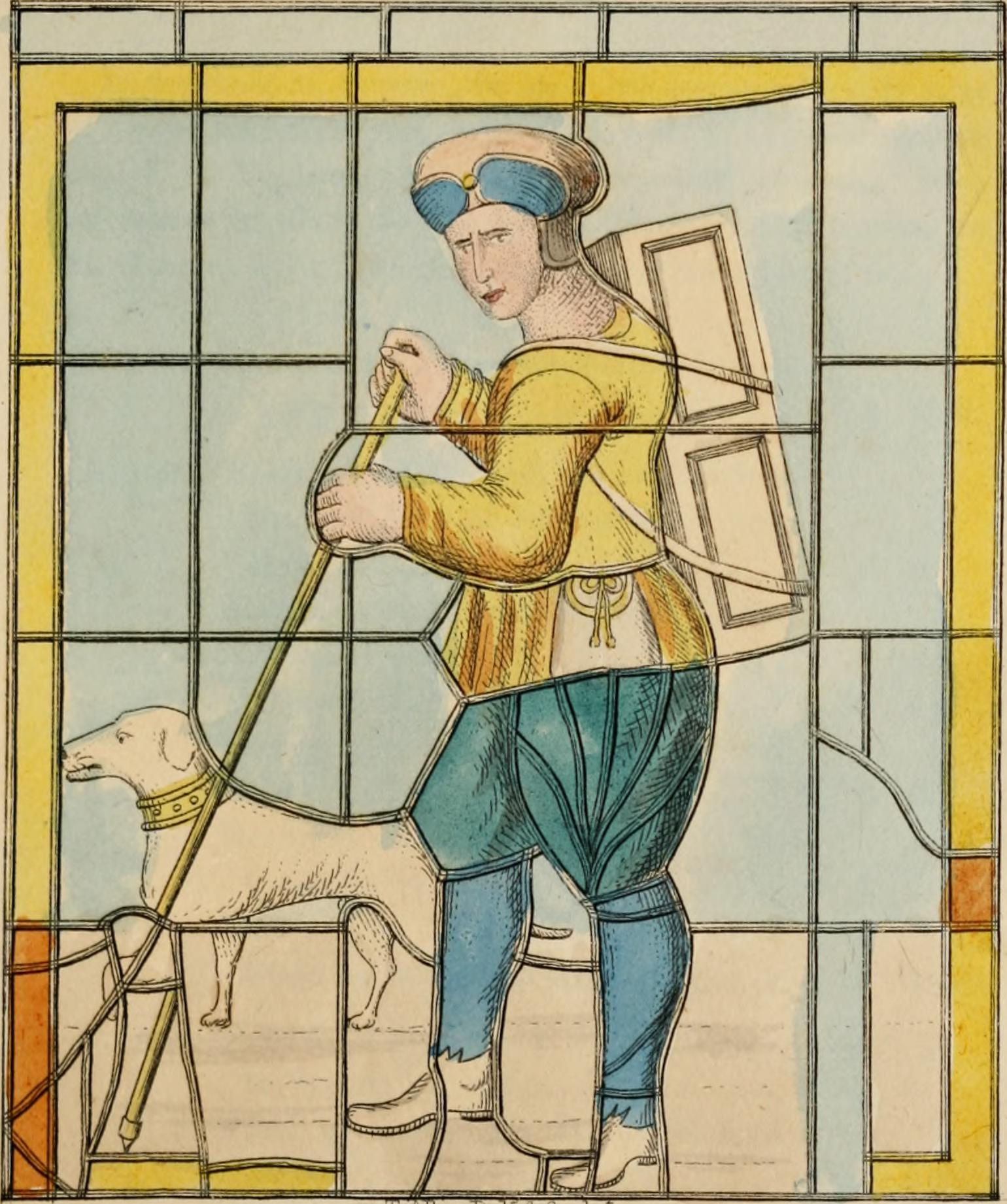
Pedlar's window

In 1377, the stone tower was built; it was repaired in 1834–1835, but is otherwise intact and visitors can climb the tower for views across London. The body of the church was continually rebuilt and enriched over the centuries but, decisively, in 1851–1852 the aisles and nave were rebuilt by Philip Charles Hardwick, an architect prominent in the construction of banks and railway stations but not considered to be in the "first rank" of his generation; his father, Sir Philip Hardwick, designed the Euston Arch. It is described by Museum of London Archaeology Service "as an almost complete rebuilding of the old body of the church". The most eye-catching survivals are four of eight corbels in the ceiling of the nave. These are a mix of medieval and Victorian construction.

One of the few 20th-century interventions in the church's fabric took place in around 1900, with the insertion of an immersion font and a baptistery at the base of the tower, said to be one of only two examples in Anglican churches in England. During the Second World War, the stained glass was badly damaged by bombs and, in the 1950s, the stained glass was replaced by either plain glass or panels by Francis Stephens (1921–2002), including a replica of the "Pedlar's Window". The bombs also broke up the altar donated in 1888 by Sir Henry Doulton as a memorial to his wife; Doulton's ceramic factory stood about 300 yards to the south.

In 1972, the church was made redundant due to its dilapidation and gloom, and also because of changes in the population settlement of the parish: the area by the riverside had become derelict and under-populated, and the vicar wanted a church closer to where the congregation lived. In 1969, Lambeth Council designated the area around Lambeth Palace as one of the borough's first conservation areas.

Soon after the Church Commissioners obtained the necessary consents for demolition, the altar, bells and pews were removed. In 1976, Rosemary Nicholson visited the site to see the tomb of John Tradescant and was shocked to discover the church boarded up in readiness for its demolition. She established the Tradescant Trust, which was awarded a 99-year lease from the Diocese of Southwark, who continue to own the land. The trust's rescue and repair of the structure became one of the great architectural conservation causes of its time, and the church became a museum.

== St Mary's churchyard and burials ==
The church was a place of burial until the churchyard was closed in 1854, and the ground level of the site has risen in consequence. It is estimated that there are over 26,000 burials. The prestige of the site is reflected in the wills of many citizens who ordered tombs for themselves, particularly in the chancel. The most significant of these is the chantry tomb on its north wall of Hugh Peyntwyn (died 1504), which is the earliest known example of a new design of wall monument associated with the royal workshops. Opposite is a monument of the same type to John Mompesson (died 1524). The Garden Museum is unique in having two monuments of this type.

The church originally housed the 15th- and 16th-century tombs of many members of the Howard family, including now-lost memorial brasses to Thomas Howard, 2nd Duke of Norfolk (died 1524) and his wife Agnes Howard, Duchess of Norfolk (died 1545), and is also the burial place of Anne Boleyn's mother, Elizabeth Boleyn (died 1538), formerly Howard. Elias Ashmole (instrumental in the development of speculative freemasonry and founder of the Ashmolean Museum at Oxford) was buried in the church in 1692. Later burials inside the church includes the soprano Nancy Storace and French noblewoman Jeanne de Valois-Saint-Rémy.

Burials outside in the churchyard include John Sealy of the Coade Stone Manufactory and Vice-Admiral Bligh of HMS Bounty fame. The churchyard is exceptional for having Grade II* listed tombs (those of Tradescant, Sealy and Bligh). Lambeth expanded quickly in the 19th century and 15,900 burials are recorded in the two decades after 1790. The churchyard was enlarged in 1814 but was closed in 1854, at a time when other city churchyards were closed by Act of Parliament.

=== Tomb of the Tradescants ===
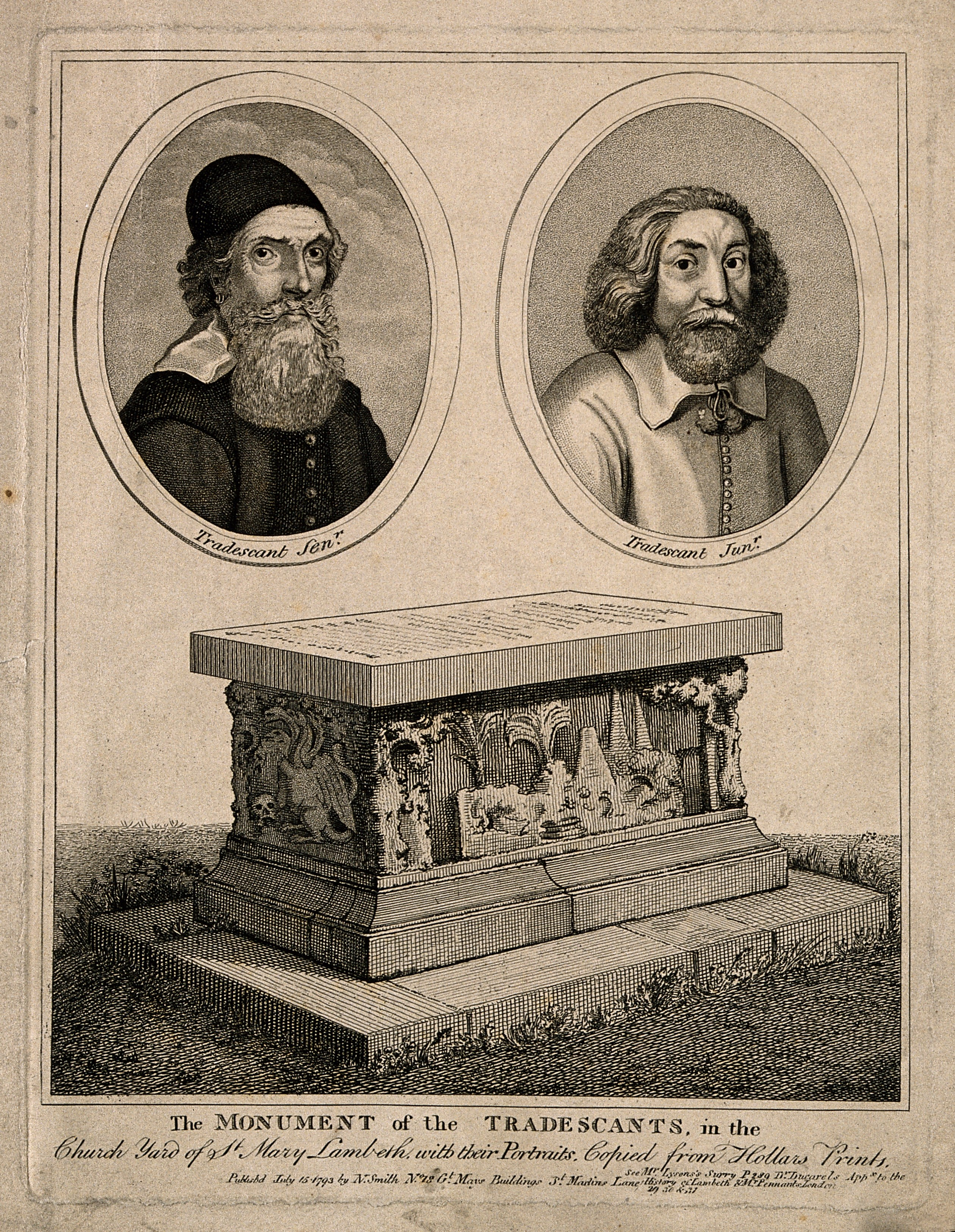
An engraving of 1793 depicting the Tradescants (portraits after Wenceslaus Hollar) and their tomb

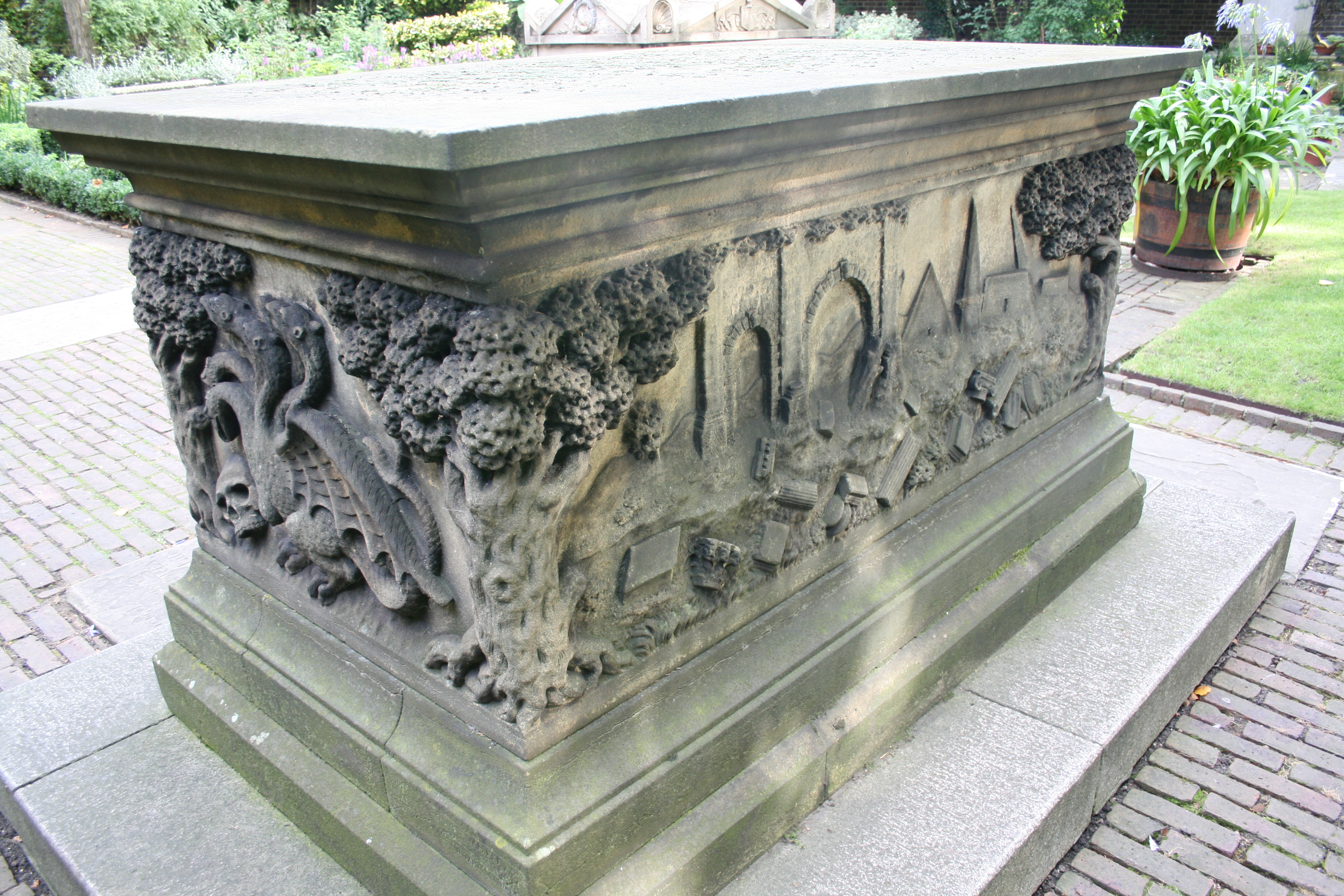
The Tradescant tomb in 2007

Five members of the Tradescant family are buried here: John Tradescant the Elder; John Tradescant the Younger with his two wives Jane and Hester, and his son, also called John, who died aged 19. The original 17th-century design for the tomb is in the Pepys Library, Cambridge, and an image of it may also be found at the National Portrait Gallery.

The present tomb is the third on the site of the Tradescant grave and replicates the original design. It was restored by public subscription in 1853.

On the east side of the tomb is carved the family arms, on the west side a skull and a seven-headed hydra, on the south side broken columns, Corinthian capitals, a pyramid and ruins, and on the north side shells, a crocodile, and a view of some Egyptian buildings.

The epitaph on the top of the tomb was written by Tradescant's friend, John Aubrey (spelling modernised):

Know, stranger, ere thou pass, beneath this stone
Lie John Tradescant, grandsire, father, son
The last dy'd in his spring, the other two,
Liv'd till they had travelled Art and Nature through,
As by their choice Collections may appear,
Of what is rare in land, in sea, in air,
Whilst they (as Homer's Iliad in a nut)
A world of wonders in one closet shut,
These famous Antiquarians that had been
Both Gardeners to the Rose and Lily Queen,
Transplanted now themselves, sleep here & when
Angels shall with their trumpets waken men,
And fire shall purge the world, these three shall rise
And change this Garden then for Paradise.

Local Lambeth legend states that if the tomb is danced around twelve times, while Big Ben strikes midnight, a ghost appears.

== Coffins found during redevelopment ==
During renovation works in 2016, workers uncovered a vault containing 30 coffins, including those of five Archbishops of Canterbury. These included: Richard Bancroft (who oversaw the production of the King James Bible), John Moore, Frederick Cornwallis, Matthew Hutton and Thomas Tenison. Further identified burials were Catherine Moore, wife of John Moore, and John Bettesworth, a Dean of Arches.
