= John Bettesworth =

John Bettesworth (1677 – 17 December 1751) was Dean of the Arches.

Bettesworth was the son of Robert Bettesworth, a saddler, and was born in Petersfield, Hampshire. He was admitted to St John's College, Cambridge in 1696 (although he did not matriculate until 1699), graduating B.A. 1700, LL.B. 1701, LL.D. 1706.

He was appointed as Dean of the Arches and Master of the Prerogative Court of Canterbury in 1710, serving in both capacities until his death in 1751.

He married in 1711 Elizabeth Jones, the daughter of Revd John Jones, rector of Selattyn, Shropshire, and sister-in-law of Edmund Gibson, Bishop of London. He had a son, also John Bettesworth, who became Chancellor of London and another son, Edmund, who became vicar of Highworth, Wiltshire.

Bettesworth's coffin was discovered in 2017 beneath the floor of the mediaeval church of St Mary-at-Lambeth during refurbishment of the Garden Museum.
