= John Tradescant the Elder =

English botanist (1570–1638)

John Tradescant
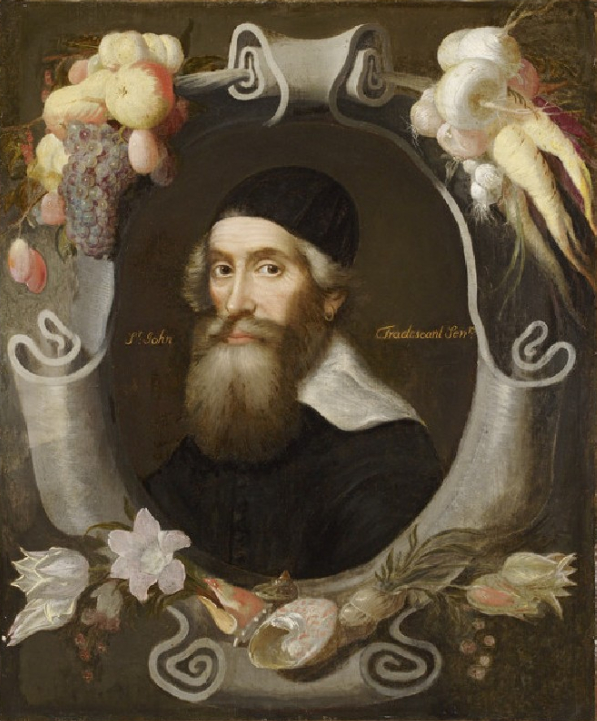
- John Tradescant the Elder (portrait attributed to Cornelis de Neve)
- Born: 1570s Suffolk
- Died: 15–16 April 1638
- Occupations: Naturalist, gardener, collector and traveller

John Tradescant the Elder ( /trəˈdɛskənt/; c. 1570s – 15–16 April 1638), father of John Tradescant the Younger, was an English naturalist, gardener, collector and traveller.

== Life ==
John Tradescant was probably born in Suffolk. On 18 June 1607 he married Elizabeth Day of Meopham in Kent, England. She was the daughter of Jeames Day, a vicar.

Tradescant began his career as head gardener to Robert Cecil, 1st Earl of Salisbury, at Hatfield House, who initiated Tradescant in travelling by sending him to the Low Countries for fruit trees in 1610/11. He was kept on by Robert's son William, to produce gardens at the family's London house, Salisbury House. He then designed gardens on the site of St Augustine's Abbey for Lord Wotton in 1615–1623.

In 1623, Tradescant became gardener to the royal favourite George Villiers, 1st Duke of Buckingham, remodelling his gardens at New Hall, Essex and at Burley-on-the-Hill. He travelled to the Nikolo-Korelsky Monastery in Arctic Russia in 1618 (his own account of the expedition survives in his collection), to the Levant and to Algiers during an expedition against the Barbary pirates in 1620, returned to the Low Countries on Buckingham's behalf in 1624, and finally went to Paris and (as an engineer for the ill-fated siege of La Rochelle) the Île de Ré with Buckingham. After Buckingham's assassination in 1628, he was engaged in 1630 by King Charles I to be keeper of His Majesty's Gardens, Vines, and Silkworms at Queen Henrietta Maria's minor palace, Oatlands Palace in Surrey.

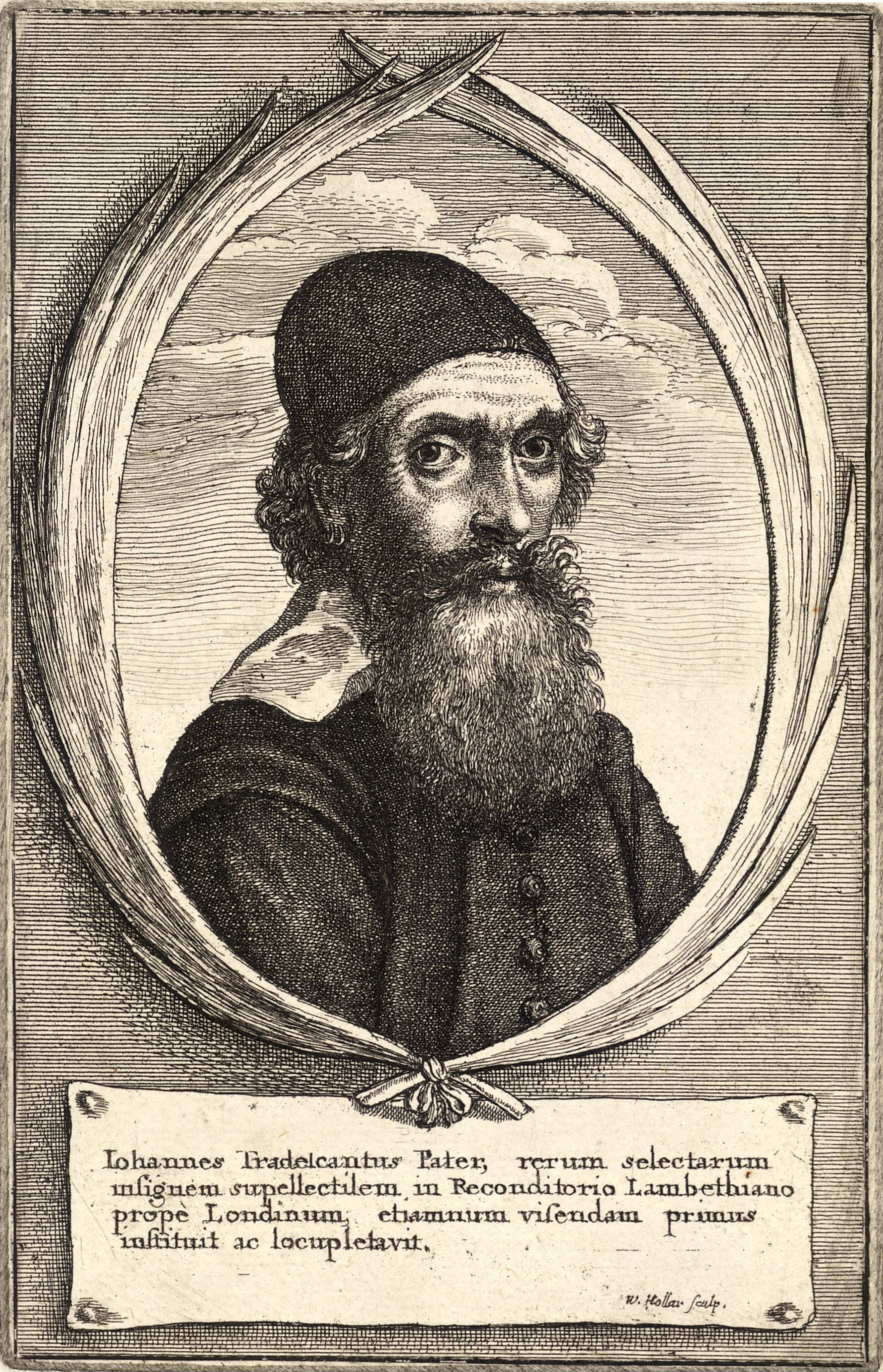
Engraving of John Tradescant the Elder by Wenceslas Hollar

On all his trips he collected seeds and bulbs, from which he assembled a collection of curiosities of natural history and ethnography which he housed in a large house, "The Ark", in Lambeth, London. The Ark was the prototypical "Cabinet of Curiosity", a collection of rare and strange objects, that became the first museum open to the public in England, the Musaeum Tradescantianum. He gathered specimens through American colonists, including his personal friend John Smith, who bequeathed Tradescant a quarter of his library. From their botanical garden in Lambeth, on the south bank of the Thames, he and his son, John Tradescant the younger, introduced many plants into English gardens that have become part of the modern gardener's repertory.

He is buried in the churchyard of St-Mary-at-Lambeth, as is his son. The church is now established as the Garden Museum.

== Legacy ==
The Tradescant collection, which was added to significantly by Tradescant's son, John Tradescant the Younger, was later given to the University of Oxford by Elias Ashmole. It was combined with an older University collection to become the Ashmolean Museum, which opened in 1683.

A genus of flowering plants (Tradescantia) was named in honour of the two men by Carl Linnaeus in 1752.

Tradescant Road, off South Lambeth Road in Vauxhall, marks the former boundary of the Tradescant estate.

== Popular culture ==
Tradescant is the subject of the novel Earthly Joys by Philippa Gregory.

== See also ==
- Edward Lhuyd – curator of the Ashmolean Museum

== Sources ==
- Allan, Mea (1964). The Tradescants: Their Plants, Gardens and Museum 1570–1662. London: Michael Joseph.
- Leith-Ross, Prudence (1984). The John Tradescants: Gardeners to the Rose and Lily Queen. Peter Owen. ISBN 0-720-60612-8.
- MacGregor, Arthur, ed. (1983). Tradescant's Rarities: Essays on the Foundation of the Ashmolean Museum. Clarendon Press. ISBN 0-198-13405-3.
- Potter, Jennifer (2006). Strange Blooms: The Curious Lives and Adventures of the John Tradescants. Atlantic. ISBN 1-843-54334-6.
