= Nikolay Mylnikov =

Nikolay Mylnikov may refer to:

- Nikolay Mylnikov (painter), Russian painter
- Nikolai Vladimirovich Mylnikov (born 1977), Russian footballer
