= Pleshcheyevo Ozero National Park =

National park in Russia

Pleshcheyovo Ozero National Park
- Плещеево озеро; Pleshcheevo Ozero
- IUCN category II (national park)
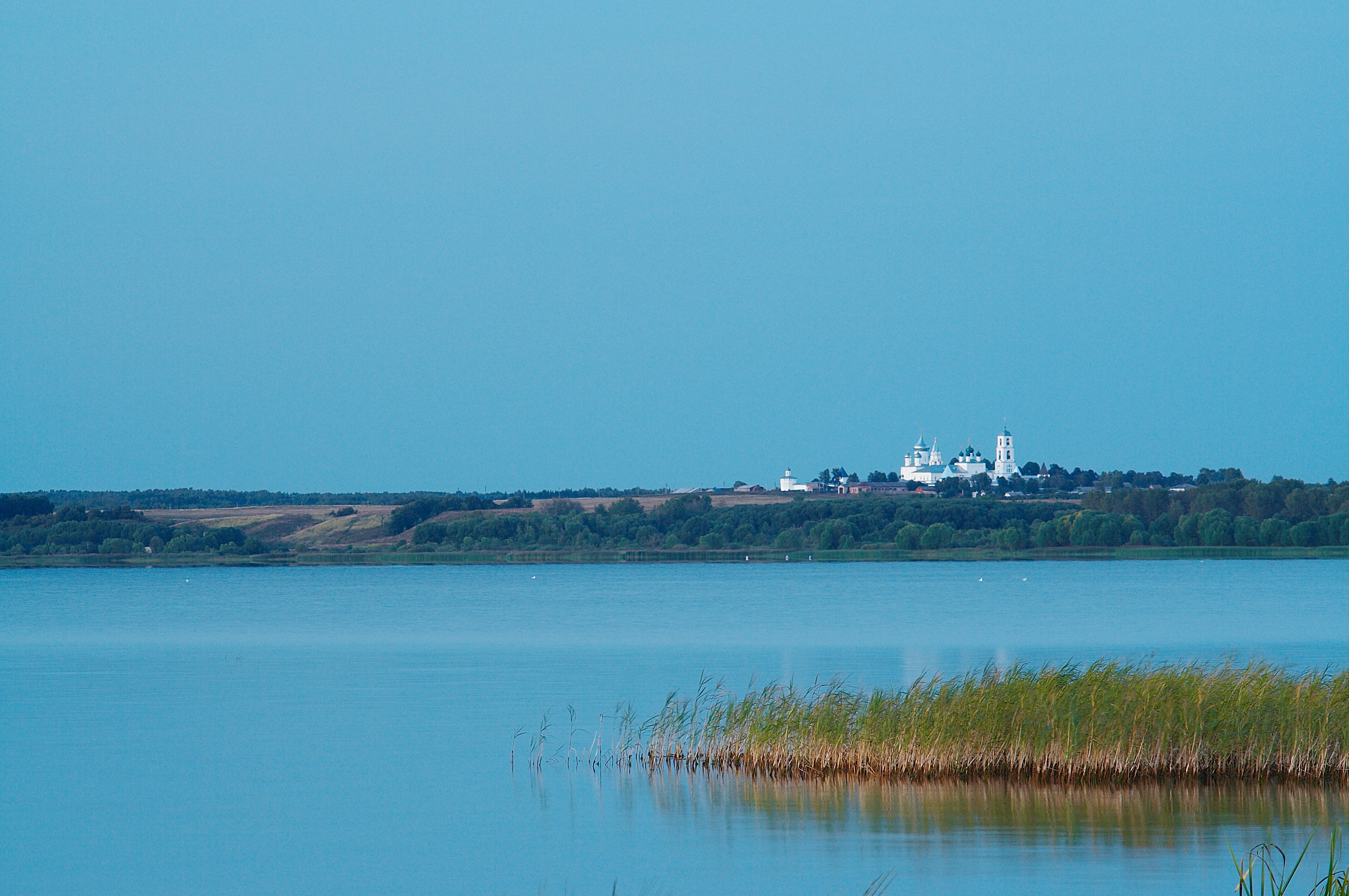
- A view toward the Monastery of St. Nicetas

- Location within Russia
- Location: Yaroslavl Oblast
- Nearest city: Pereslavl-Zalessky
- Coordinates: 56°46′N 38°44′E
- Area: 23,790 hectares (58,786 acres; 238 km^{2}; 92 sq mi)
- Established: October 16, 1997
- Governing body: FGBU "Pleshcheyovo Ozero"
- Website: http://www.plesheevo-lake.ru/

Pleshcheyovo Ozero (Lake) National Park (Russian: Национальный парк «Плещеево озеро») covers Lake Pleshcheyevo and surrounding areas in the Zalesye part of the Yaroslavl Oblast. The lake is highly popular for recreational use, as an ecological habitat, and is a former resort for the Russian tsars. The lake is located on the central part of the East European Plain, about 130 km northeast of Moscow, in the basin of the Upper Volga. On the southeast shore is the old town of Pereslavl-Zalessky, included in the Golden Ring of Russia.

== Topography ==
The lake itself is 9 km in diameter, and has a 28 km shoreline. It is 25 meters in depth but shallow around the edges. The surrounding shore and region is shaped by the receded glaciers of the last ice age, leaving a moraine-type landscape: gravelly formations of long ridges, extensive wetlands and meandering rivers, and occasional isolated hills. The higher ground above the lake has river valleys with terraces, and the middle region wetlands include peat bogs and other wetlands, including the Berendeyevskoye swamp (5007 hectares). The southern area of the park reached

Boundaries (dark green line) of Pleshcheyovo NP, centered on Lake Pleshcheyevo. Town of Pereslavl-Zalessky on southeast bank of lake.

== Ecoregion and climate ==
The ecoregion of Pleshcheyovo is Sarmatic mixed forests (WWF ID #436). This ecoregion is a strip of low forests, lakes and wetlands, running from the Baltic Sea east to the Urals. Forest cover is typically mixed conifer and deciduous trees, with large unbroken tracts under pressure from agriculture. For aquatic habitat, the park is in the "Volga-Ural" freshwater ecoregion (WWF ID #410), a region that is characterized in general by a high number fish species but relatively few endemics. Of the 65 species of fish in the overall ecoregion, 19 are found in Lake Pleshcheyevo. The development of dams, reservoirs and catchments along the Volga have disrupted spawning sites and favored species adapted to slower moving waters.

The climate of Pleshcheyovo is Humid continental climate, warm summer (Köppen climate classification (Dfb)). This climate is characterized by large swings in temperature, both diurnally and seasonally, with mild summers and cold, snowy winters. Average temperatures range from 10 F in January to 64 F in July. Annual precipitation averages 23 inches. Annual snowcover is 13–140 cm, and typical depth is 30–40 cm. Soil in mid-winter freezes to a depth of 1 meter.

Yaroslavl, Yaroslavl Oblast, Russia

Climate chart (precipitation, max. and min. temperature)
| J | F | M | A | M | J | J | A | S | O | N | D |
| 1.5 17 4 | 1.1 22 6 | 1 32 17 | 1.6 48 32 | 2.1 64 43 | 2.6 71 50 | 3.3 74 55 | 2.5 71 51 | 2.2 59 43 | 2.1 45 34 | 1.8 32 23 | 1.7 23 11 |
- █ Average max. and min. temperatures in °F
- █ Precipitation totals in inches
- Source: [http://meteoinfo.ru/climate/klimatgorod/1756-1246618396
Metric conversion
| J | F | M | A | M | J | J | A | S | O | N | D |
| 37 −8 −16 | 27 −6 −14 | 26 0 −9 | 40 9 0 | 52 18 6 | 65 21 10 | 84 23 13 | 64 22 11 | 55 15 6 | 52 7 1 | 46 0 −5 | 43 −5 −12 |
- █ Average max. and min. temperatures in °C
- █ Precipitation totals in mm

== Plants ==
The territory is partially forested, with stands of artificially-introduced Scots Pine (130–150 years ago) along the shore. There are also spruce and aspen forest areas, and some mixed broadleaf with oak trees at their northern limit. The park has recorded 790 species of vascular plants in 93 different families.

== Animals ==
The park has recorded 300 species of vertebrates, including 60 species of mammals, 210 of birds, 10 of reptiles and amphibians, 109 of insects, and 19 of fish. A large-sized vendance (Russian: "Ryapushka"), a freshwater whitefish of the Salmonidae, is endemic to Lake Pleshcheyevo; some authors describe it as a subspecies Coregonus albus Pereslavicus. While endemic, the Ryapushki is not threatened, and served in smoked form as a local delicacy. The health of the Ryapushka has been historically a measure of the health of the lake, as records have been kept of catches and deliveries to the royal court since 1645, through the limiting of large-scale commercial capture in the early 1960s. The Ryapuska was the subject of one of the Russian government's first public acts concerning conservation, when a ban on catching small whitefish was imposed in 1668.

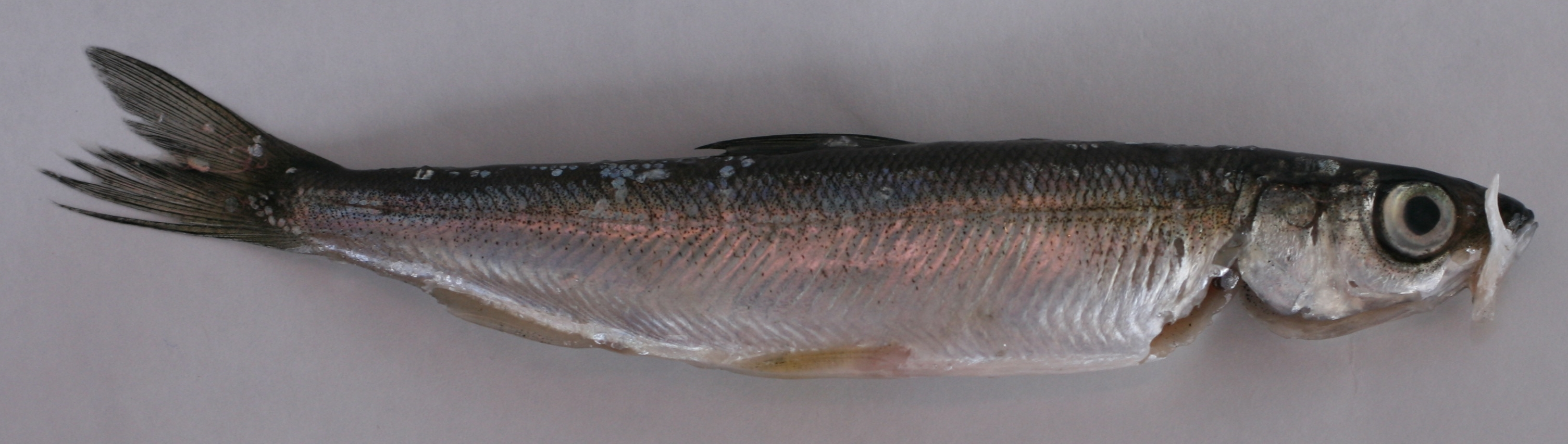
"Ryapushka", a freshwater whitefish of the lake

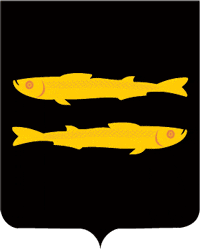
Ryapushka on the coat of arms of the local town of Pereslavl-Zalessky

== History ==
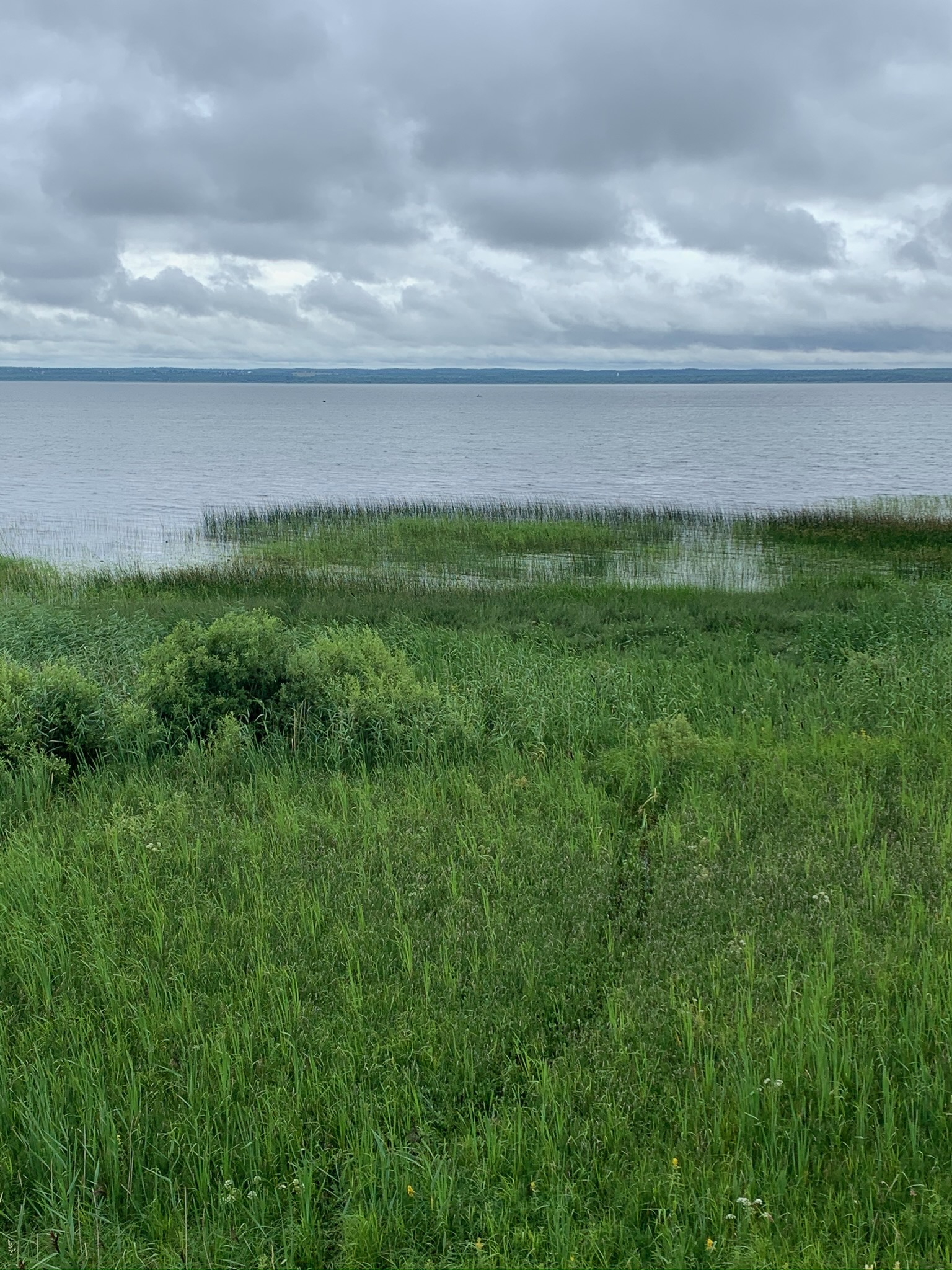
Lake Pleshcheyevo (2020)

The lake region has been inhabited for millennia, and shows the long interplay of natural and human forces. The ancient city of Pereslavl has a wide variety of historical, cultural, and natural sites. The city draws hundreds of thousands of visitors every year to see its historic buildings and sites.

== Tourism ==
Pereslavl is a popular tourist destination from Moscow - it is a 2-3 bus ride between the two cities, and the buses run every. Hotels can fill quickly during holidays and peak periods.

== See also ==
- Protected areas of Russia
- Lake Pleshcheyevo
