= Mylnikov =

Mylnikov (feminine: Mylnikova) is a Russian language occupational surname derived from the occupation of mylnik, soap manufacturer/vendor. The surname may refer to:

- Andrei Mylnikov, Russian painter
- Grigory Mylnikov, Soviet World War II pilot
- Nikolay Mylnikov
  - Nikolay Mylnikov (painter)
  - Nikolai Vladimirovich Mylnikov, Russian footballer
- Roman Mylnikov, Russian ice dancer
- Sergei Mylnikov, ice hockey player
- Alexander Petrovich Mylnikov (1952–2019), Soviet and Russian scientist, biologist.
