= Nicetas Stylites =

12th-century Russian saint

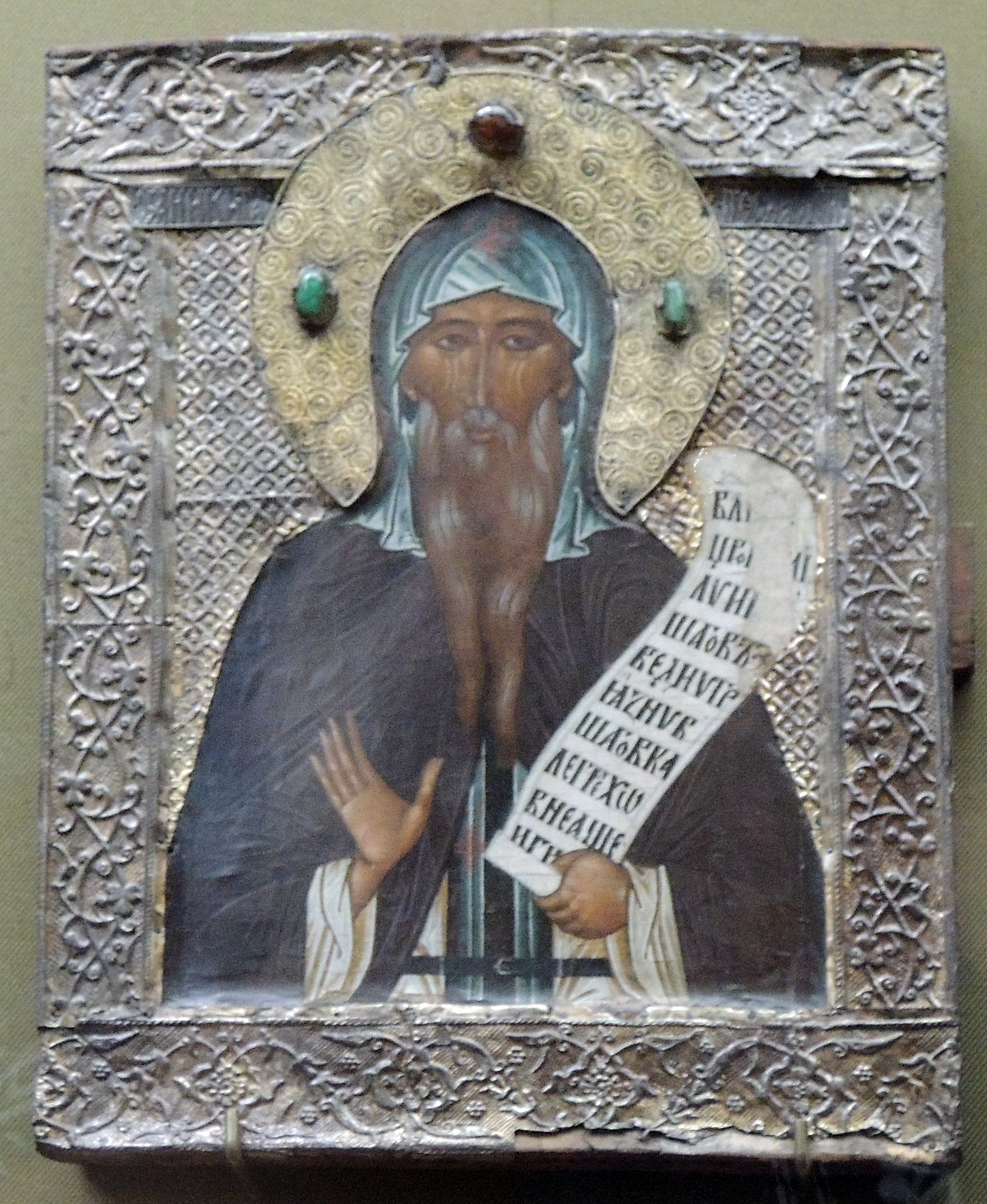

Sainthood
- Feast day: May 24
- Venerated in: Eastern Orthodox Church Ukrainian Greek Catholic Church

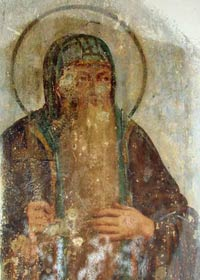
Nikita Stylites (fresco, 18th century)

Nicetas (Nikita) Stylites was a 12th-century monk living in Kievan Rus' who founded the Monastery of St. Nicetas on the eastern shore of Lake Pleshcheyevo in Zalesye. He was later canonized as a saint in the Eastern Orthodox Church.

Nikita led a dissolute life in his youth. However, upon entering a church on a certain occasion he heard the words of the Prophet Isaiah (1:16) 'Wash you (of your sins), make you clean;' with this a profound conversion was effected in his soul.

Thus converted Nikita left all he possessed and entered upon the ascetic life near Pereyaslavl. His discipline led him to bind himself in chains and enclose himself within a pillar, thus the title 'stylite'. He became well known as a healer.

Nikita Stylites was killed on May 16, 1186 during a robbery, the thieves having believed the hermit to have been bound by silver chains.

Nikita is commemorated May 24 by the Eastern Orthodox Church.

== See also ==
- Pole-sitting
- Nikitsky Monastery

== Sources ==
- Russian Orthodox Church, Texas
