= Boris stones =

Inscribed stones in Belarus

Coordinates: 55°29′08″N 28°45′29″E

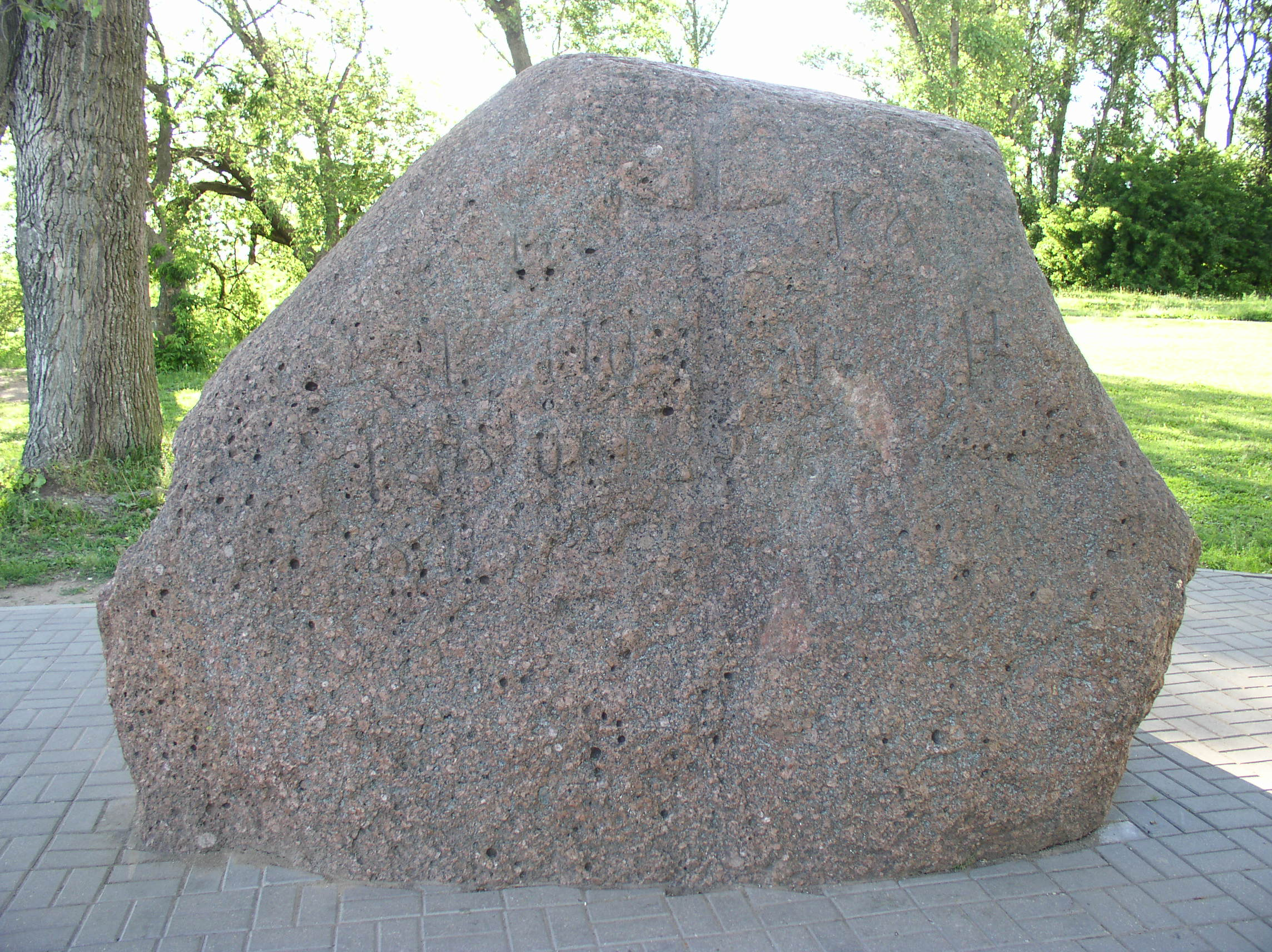
Boris stone near Cathedral of St. Sophia. Polatsk, Belarus

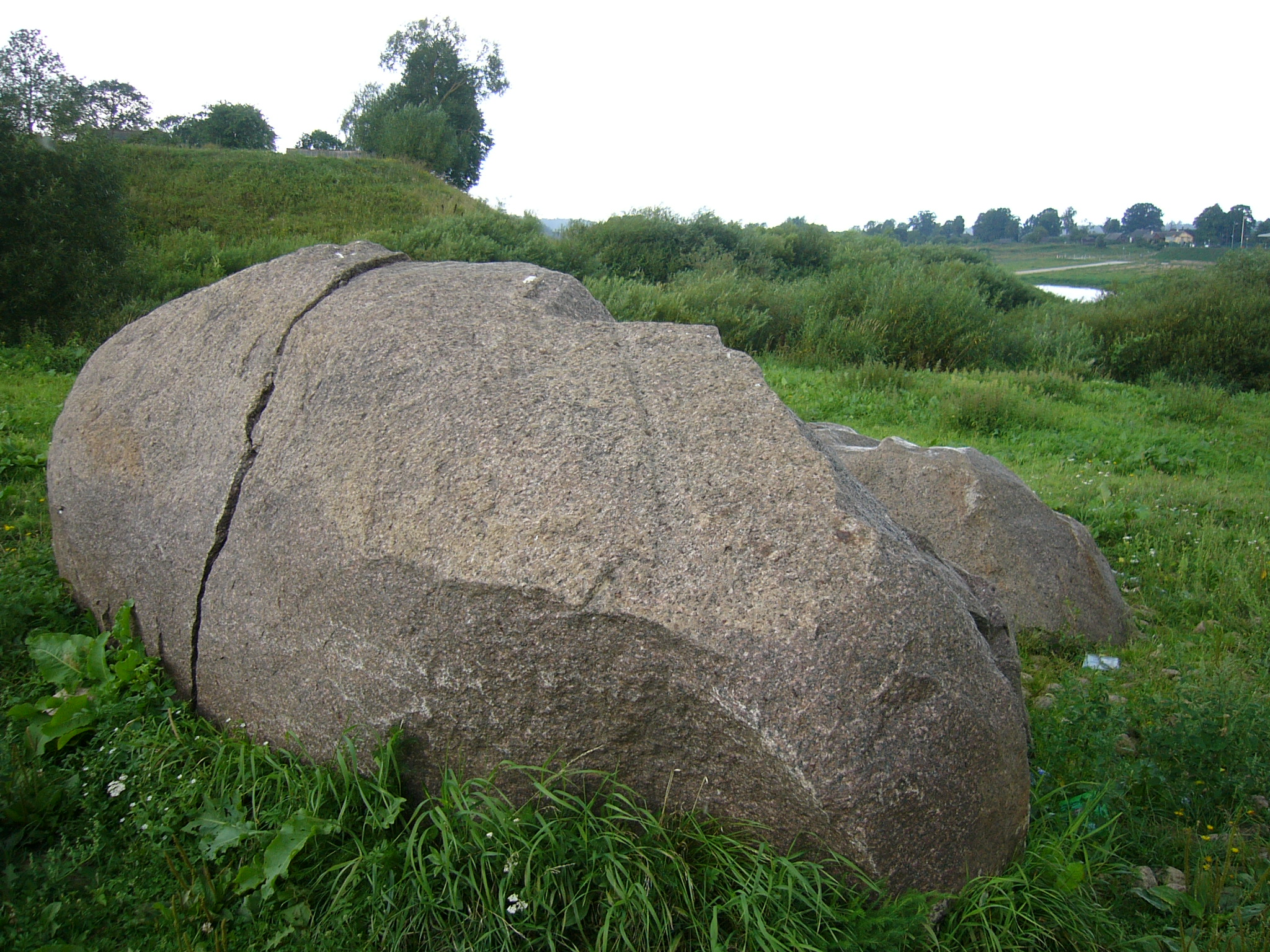
Boris stone in Druya

Boris Stones (Belarusian: Барысавы камяні, [baˈrɨsavɨ kamʲaˈni]; Russian: Борисовы камни), also called Dvina Stones (Russian: Двинские камни), are seven medieval artifacts erected along the bank of the Western Dvina between Polotsk and Drissa, Belarus. They probably predate Christianity in the area, but were inscribed in the 12th century with text and an image of Christ. The largest of the stones is 17 metres in circumference.

== History ==
Although these landmarks were described in the 16th century by Maciej Stryjkowski, it was Georg von Cancrin in 1818 who first brought them to scholarly attention. Cancrin discovered that a boulder near Orsha had the following inscription: "In the year 1171, on the 7th day of March, was completed this cross. Lord, please help your servant Basil, whose other name is Rogvolod, Boris' son".

Subsequently, several other boulders with Boris's name were discovered. In the 1930s, two of these were blown up by Communist authorities as religious objects and their remains used to pave the road between Minsk and Moscow. Another one was thrown into the river, where it lay until its discovery in 1988. When an attempt to recover it was made, the stone broke apart into three pieces. Three other boulders were moved to be exhibited near St. Sophia Cathedral in Polotsk, in the Museum of Boulders in Minsk, and in Kolomenskoe near Moscow.

== Description ==
Both names for the stones are somewhat misleading: only four of them are located along the banks of the Dvina, and one of the stones does not mention Boris at all. What unites them is their programmatic illustration: "In each case the centrepiece is an enormous cross flanked by abbreviated elements of the conventional Greek legend proclaiming Christ's victory". It is generally accepted that the Boris mentioned in the inscriptions was Rogvolod Vseslavich (baptismal name "Boris"), Vseslav's son, although it is quite likely that such boulders had been venerated by pagan locals long before the land was Christianised.

== See also ==
- The cross of Saint Euphrosyne
- Blue stones and sledoviks – similar landmarks in Russia
- Jelling stones – similar landmarks in Denmark
