= Pavel Kolendas =

Russian painter

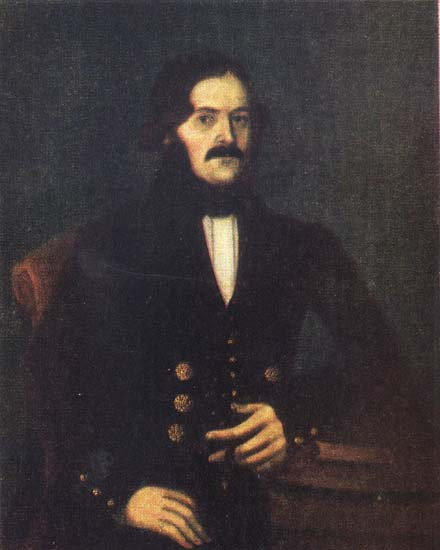
Self-portrait, from Yaroslavl portraits of the 18th and 19th centuries (set of cards), 1844

Pavel Kolendas (Павел Колендас) was a Russian painter who lived and worked in Pereslavl-Zalessky.

Kolendas was born in about 1820. A handful of portraits by his hand, held in the museum of Pereslavl-Zalessky, survive, including portraits of the 1840s children of local workers. His works fall into the category of Russian art known as “parsuna”, which bridged the worlds of religious and personal portraiture, as Russian painters began adopting the portrait painting styles of Western European salons. His style has been compared, albeit less favorably, to similar works by Grigory Ostrovsky and Nikolay Mylnikov.
