= Kolenda (surname) =

Kolenda or Kolendas is a surname. Notable people with the surname include:

- Greg Kolenda, American football player
- Havryil Kolenda (1606–1674), Ruthenian religious leader
- Łukasz Kolenda (born 1999), Polish basketball player
- Pavel Kolendas (born 1820), Russian painter
