= Kleshchin =

Former town in Pereslavsky District, Yaroslavl Oblast, Russia

Coordinates: 56.77639°N 38.83944°E

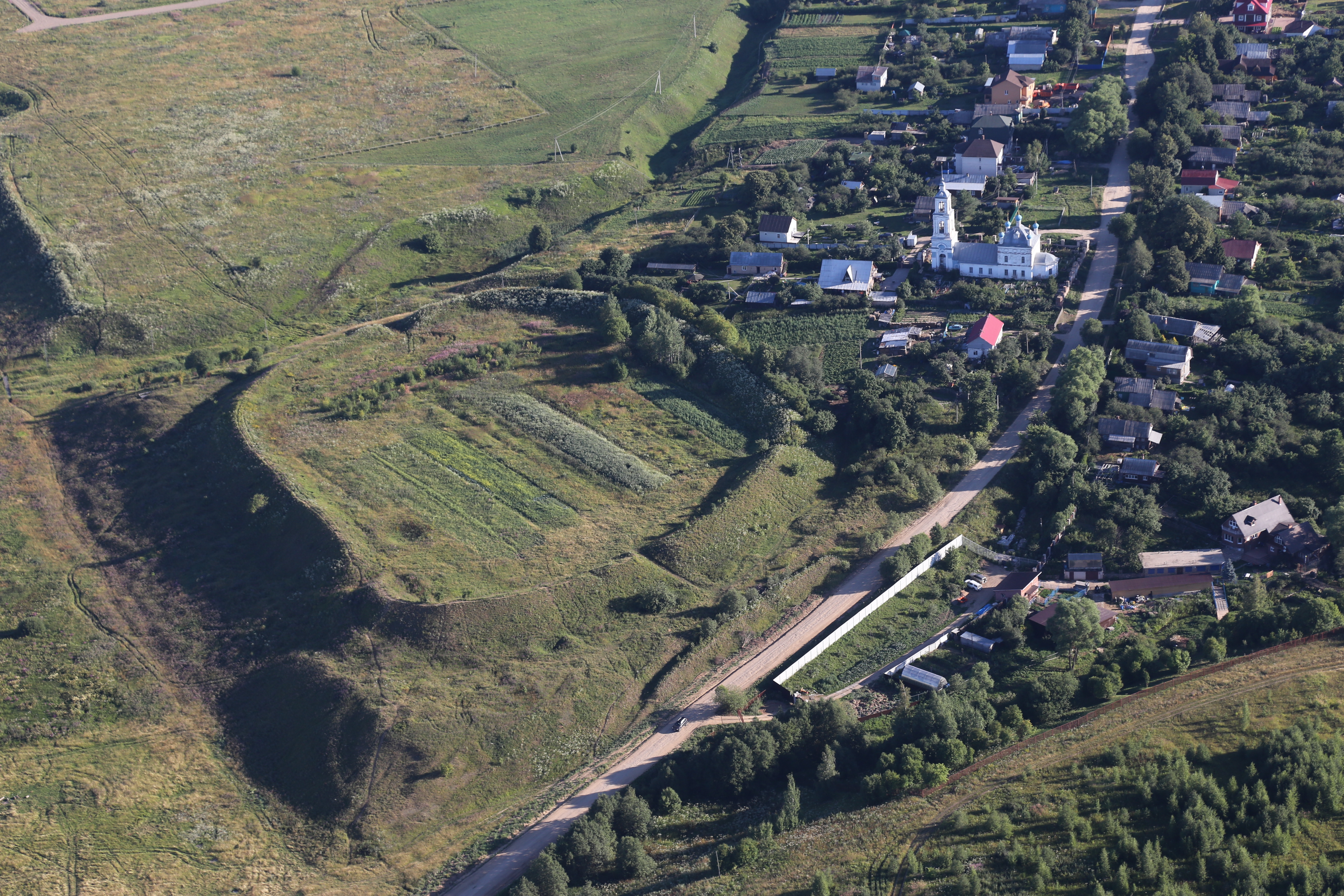
The site of the Kleshchin citadel

Kleshchin (Клещин) was a Meryan (and later Slavic) town on the eastern shore of Lake Pleshcheyevo in Zalesye. It is thought that the lake owes its name to the derelict town: the opening lines of the Primary Chronicle refer to the lake as Kleshchino (or Kleshcheyevo). In 1152, Grand Duke George I of Vladimir had Kleshchin transferred 4500 meters to the south, renaming it Pereslavl-Beyond-the-Woods.

The site of old Kleshchin occupies about two hectares near Gorodishchi ("former town"), a village that succeeded the deserted town. Ivan the Terrible presented it to the nearby Nikitsky Monastery in 1562. The site is fortified with a system of earthworks - about 3 meters (9.8 ft) high - that used to support a wooden palisade with four gate towers.

The so-called Bald Hill in the vicinity of Gorodishchi is believed to have housed a pagan sanctuary from which the sacred Blue Stone of the Meryans was overthrown and broken to pieces. This boulder is a popular tourist attraction.

== See also ==
- Sarskoye Gorodishche, the site of another major Meryan settlement, or town
