= Volkhov Chudes =

Ancient Finno-Ugric people of Volkhov River

Volkhov Chudes (волховская чудь) were a Finno-Ugric people living along the banks of the Volkhov River. The Volkhov Chudes lived upstream from Staraya Ladoga. Pauli Rahkonen's studies of local toponyms suggest that the Volkhov Chudes spoke a Finnic language.

In the southwest the toponymy has more similarities with Mordvinic and Proto-Finnic, while in the southeast toponymy has similarities with Meryan toponymy. It can be seen that the eastern Volkhov Chudes were very close to Meryans, culturally and linguistically.

== Sources ==
- Rahkonen, Pauli (2011). Finno-Ugrian hydronyms of the River Volkhov and Luga catchment areas (PDF). Helsinki: Suomalais-ugrilainen seura. pp. 205–266.
