= Nikitsky Monastery =

Coordinates: 56°45′39″N 38°51′36″E

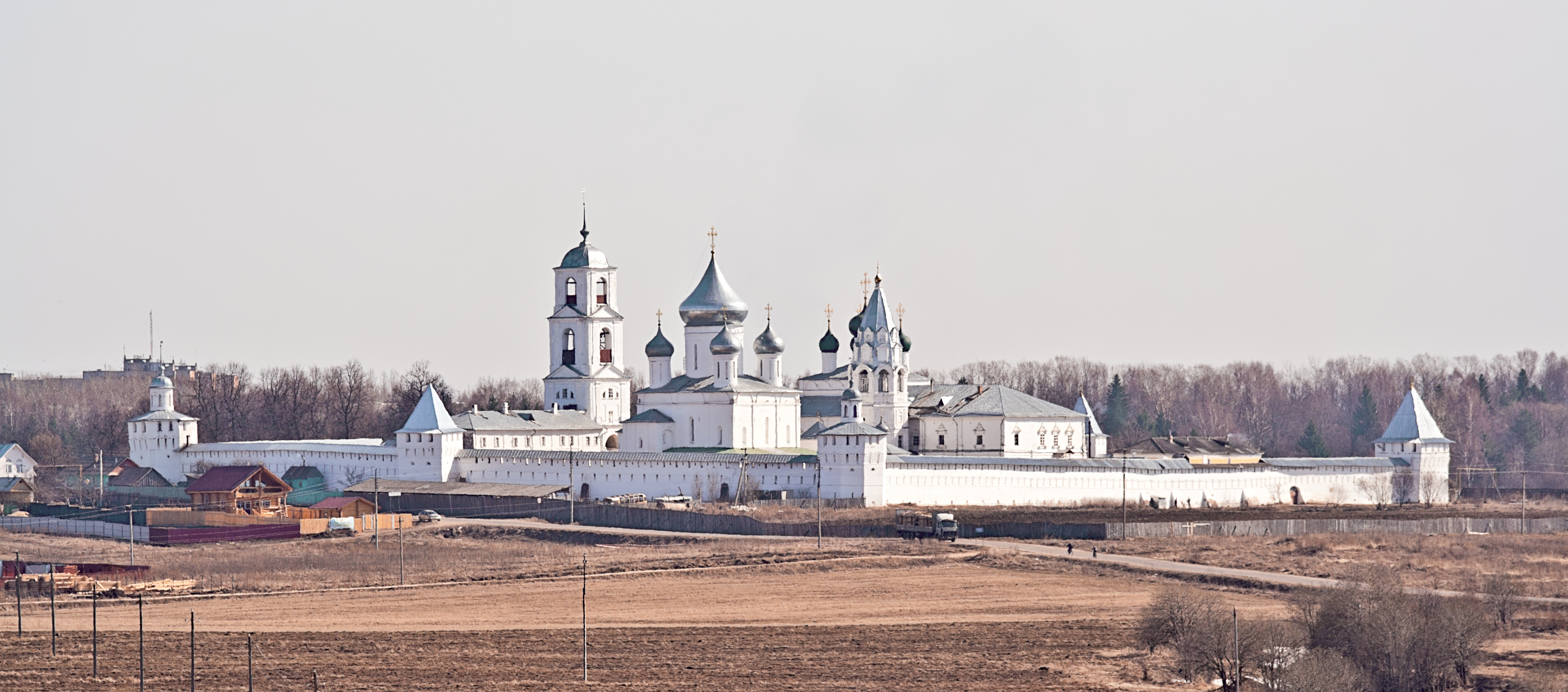
The white-walled monastery overlooking Lake Pleshcheyevo

The Nikitsky Monastery (Никитский монастырь) is a walled Orthodox monastery founded in the 12th century by Nicetas (Nikita) Stylites in a field sprawling between the Kholmogory Highway and the Lake Pleshcheyevo several miles north of Pereslavl-Zalessky. It is part of the Pleshcheyevo Lake National Park and one of the oldest monastic establishments in Zalesye.

The monastic compound is separated from the town by a wooded cemetery with a round chapel from 1702. It is the place where Nikita supposedly met and healed a prince of Chernigov. A nearby settlement known as Nikitskaya Sloboda served the needs of the monastery. After Grand Prince George reestablished the old town of Kleshchin as Pereslavl-Zalessky, the ruins of the older settlement were donated to the monastery.

During the troubles of 1611, the Poles under Jan Piotr Sapieha took the fortress after two weeks of siege and reduced it to ashes. The young Tsar Peter I selected it as his residence when he played with his amusement fleet on the nearby lake. In 1754, the monastery is recorded as owning 2000 serfs and 14 villages. The Soviets used it as a labor camp (in 1948-1953) and a military base (in 1953-59). The great dome of the katholikon collapsed in 1984 following many decades of neglect.

The Russian Orthodox Church reclaimed the property in 1993 and had it restored. The compound has a chain of fortifications and two main churches, all dating from the reign of Ivan the Terrible. The first Tsar is supposed to have prepared the monastery to become his emergency residence in case of a boyar revolt. A later addition to the compound is the tall Neoclassical bell tower rising above the main gate; it dates from 1818.
