= St. Nicholas Monastery (Pereslavl-Zalessky) =

Orthodox monastery in Pereslavl-Zalessky, Russia

Coordinates: 56.732°N 38.837°E

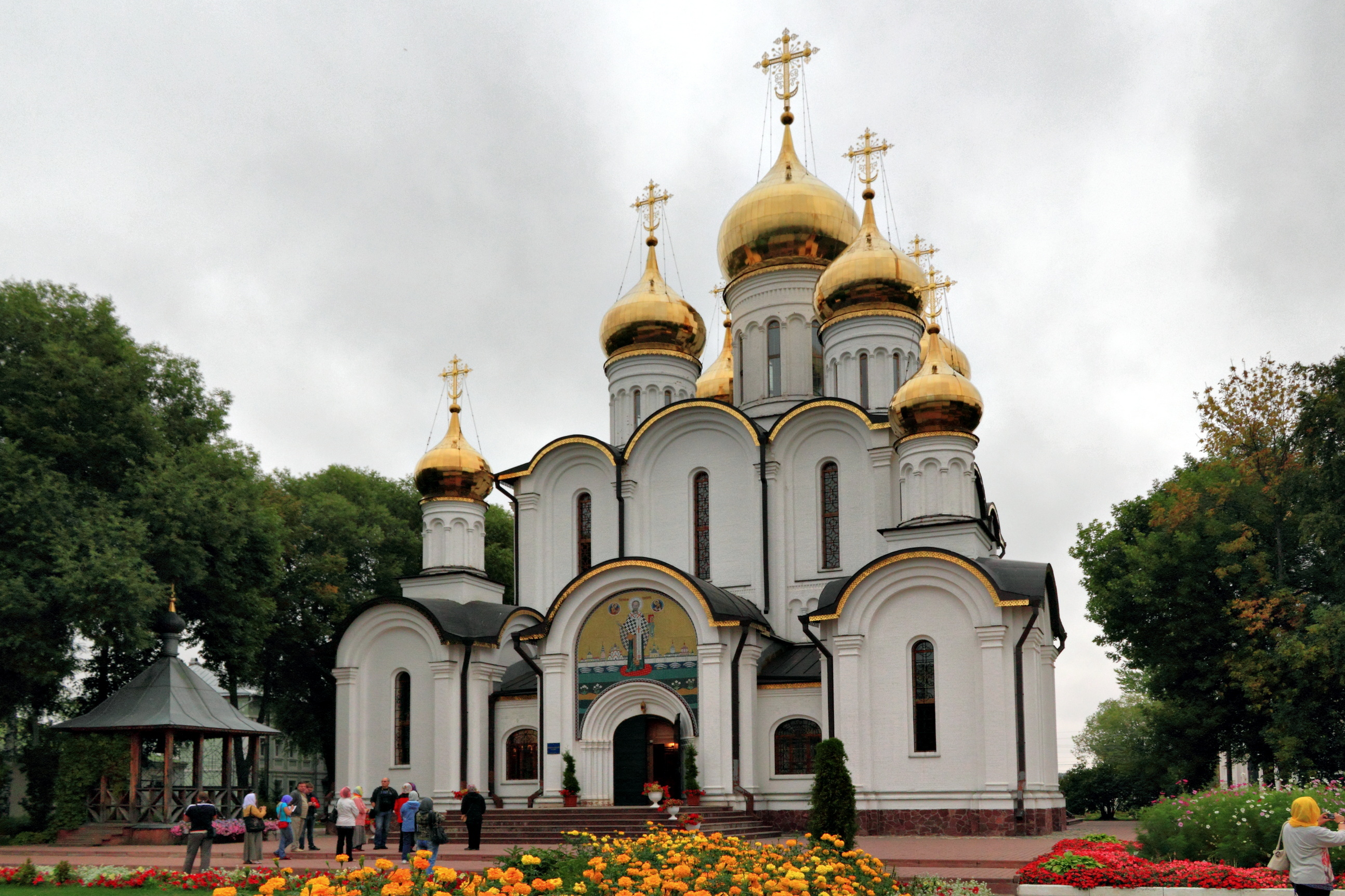

The St. Nicholas Monastery (or Nikolsky Monastery) is a Russian Orthodox monastery in Pereslavl-Zalessky, Russia.

== History ==
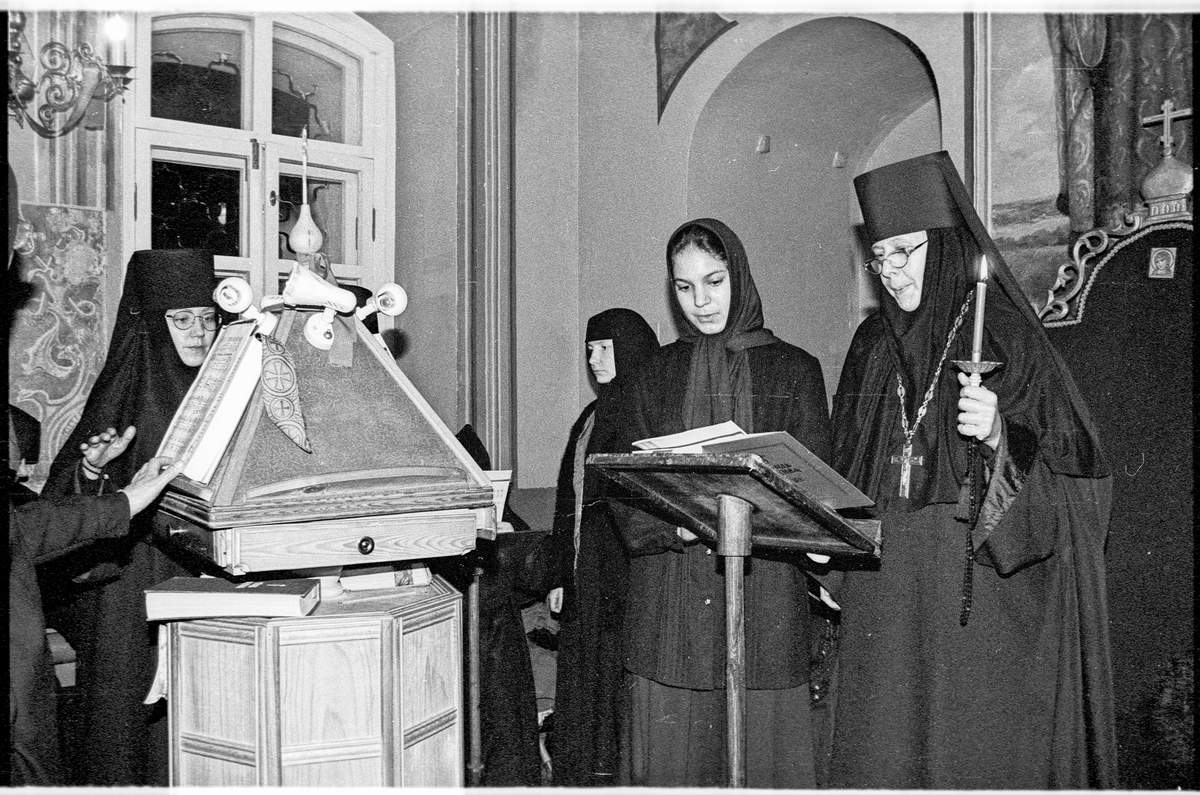
Celebrating Easter in the Annunciation Church at the Monastery.

The monastery was founded in the 14th century by St. Dimitri of Priluki. Several churches are located on the site; the St. Nicholas Cathedral was built in the 18th century and has a pyramidal shape. Two of the oldest temples on the site of the monastery have survived to the present times - the Peter and Paul Church and the Annunciation Refectory Church.

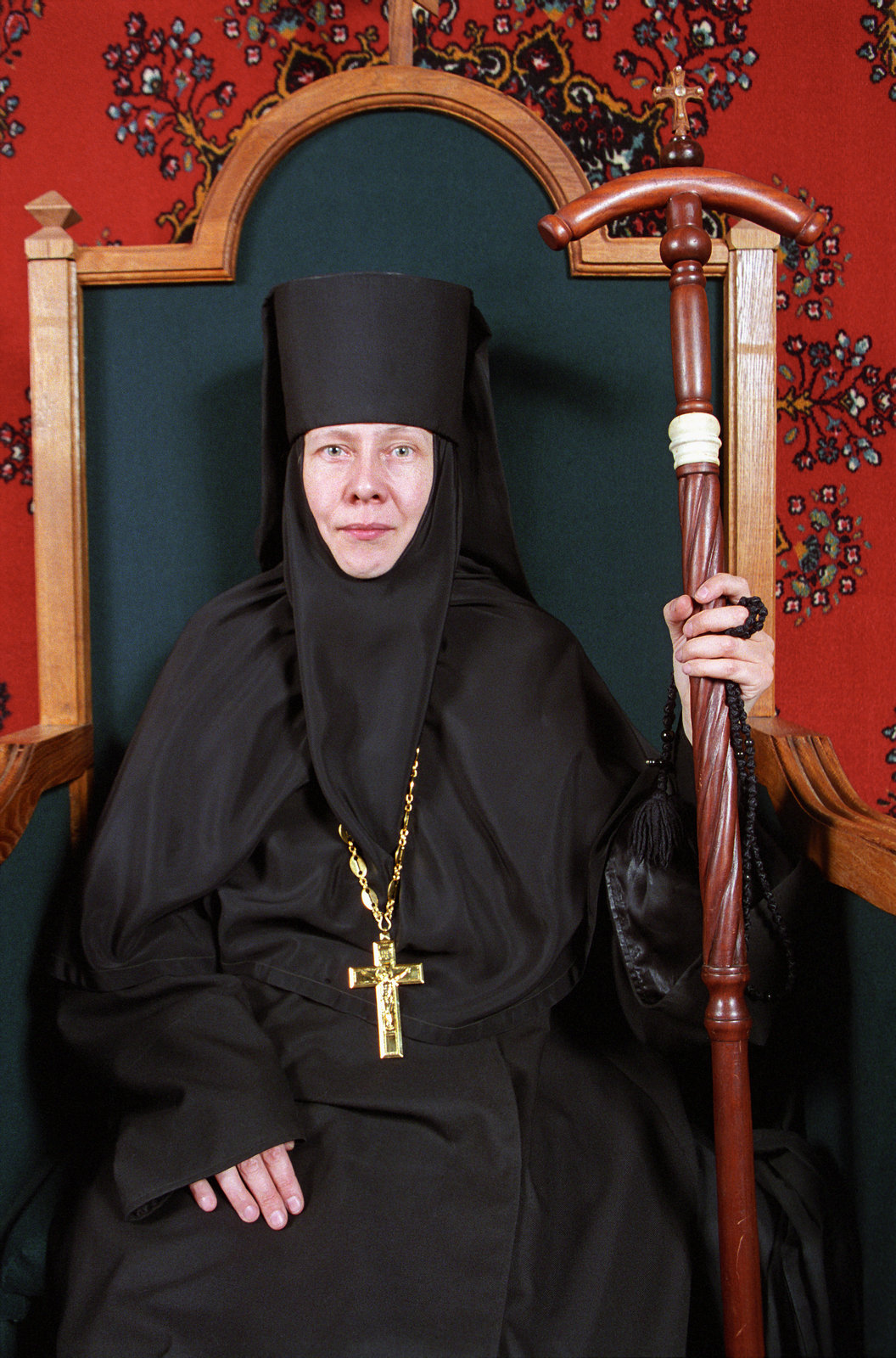
Prioress of the Monastery

The Baroque-style Church of St. Peter and Paul was built in the mid-18th century. The Annunciation Church was built in 1748 also in the Baroque style.

The St. Nicholas Monastery was mostly destroyed during the Soviet period, but has been undergoing renovations since 1999.
