= University of Pereslavl =

- Институт программных систем «УГП имени А.К. Айламазяна»
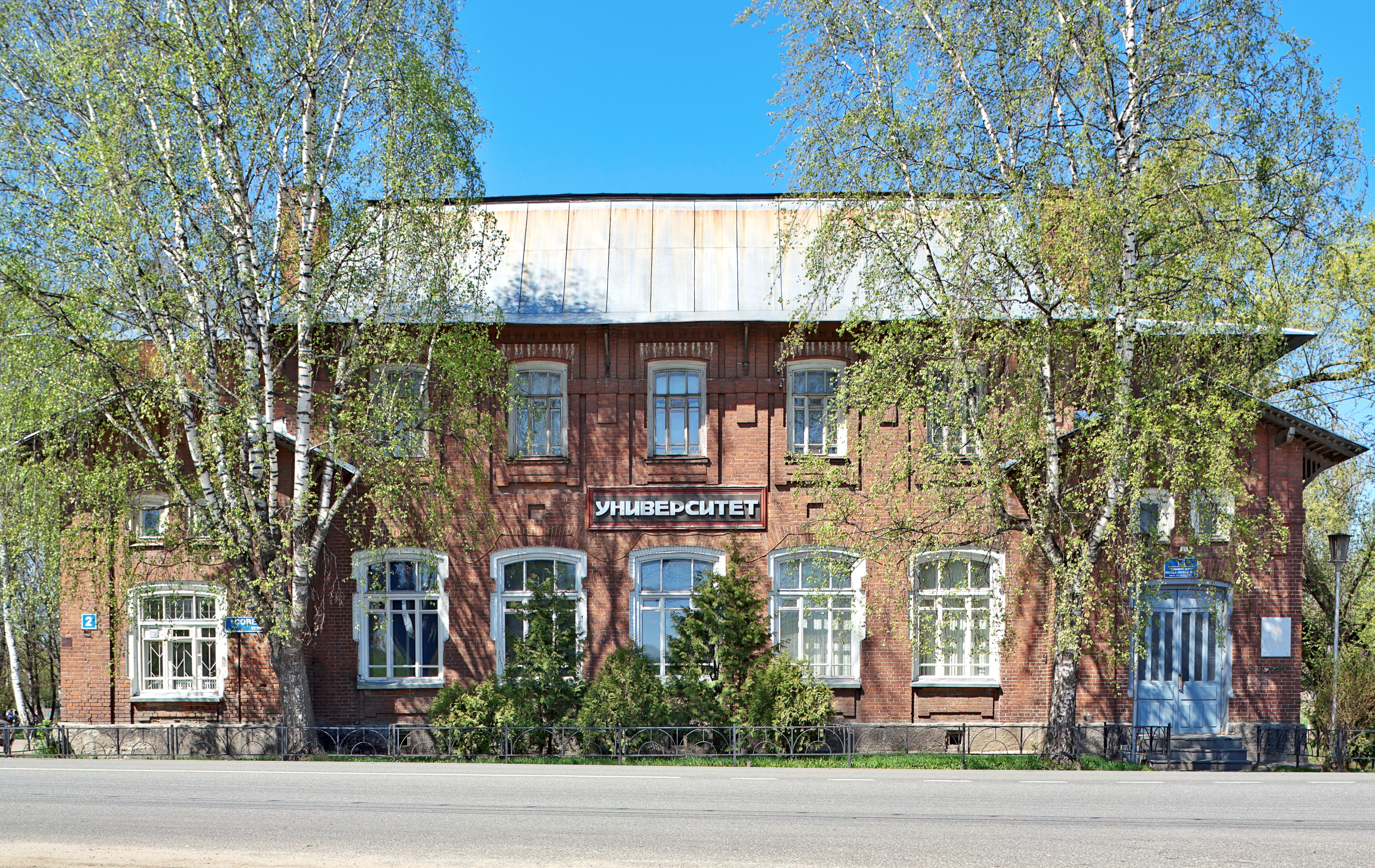
- Type: Non-state
- Active: 1992–2017
- Rector: Prof. Alfred Aylamazyan (1992—2003), Prof. Sergei Abramov (2003—2017)
- Students: 346 (as of 2009)
- Location: Pereslavl-Zalessky, Russia
- Website: http://u-pereslavl.botik.ru/

The Program Systems Institute "A. K. Aylamazyan City University of Pereslavl" (Russian: Институт программных систем «УГП имени А.К. Айламазяна»), previously known as the City University of Pereslavl, was a non-state higher educational institution in Pereslavl-Zalessky, Russia, which operated in the period 1992–2017.

== History ==
The City University of Pereslavl was founded on November 26, 1992 on the initiative of Academician Evgeny Velikhov and Professor Alfred Ailamazyan, who became the first rector (1992-2003). The second rector of the educational institution (2003-2017) was corresponding Member of the Russian Academy of Sciences Sergei Abramov. Over the 25 years of its existence, the educational institution has trained more than 900 graduates (bachelors, specialists, masters).

The university was closely linked with the Program Systems Institute of the Russian Academy of Sciences, which had operated in Pereslavl since 1984. Educational programmes at the bachelor's, master's and specialist's levels were offered in the areas of applied mathematics and informatics, information systems and technologies, and applied informatics in economics. Additionally, in 2013 a center for training and retraining of programmers was opened.

Since 2015 the university had been experiencing financial difficulties that led to its rector to request assistance. In 2017, due to the worsening of its financial situation, the university stopped its academic activities and the state license was not renewed. In November 2017 the board of trustees of the university announced the decision to liquidate the university, as the lease agreement for the buildings constituting its campus was not renewed by the city, and heating had been cancelled on account of the institution's debts. Nevertheless, an agreement was reached with the Ministry of Education and the Financial University for students to continue their education at the latter institution in an off-campus format, attending classes at the Program System Institute's facilities in the village of Veskovo, near Pereslavl, and receiving a degree in Applied Informatics upon graduation.
