= Sledovik =

Sacred stones in Slavic and Finnic cultures

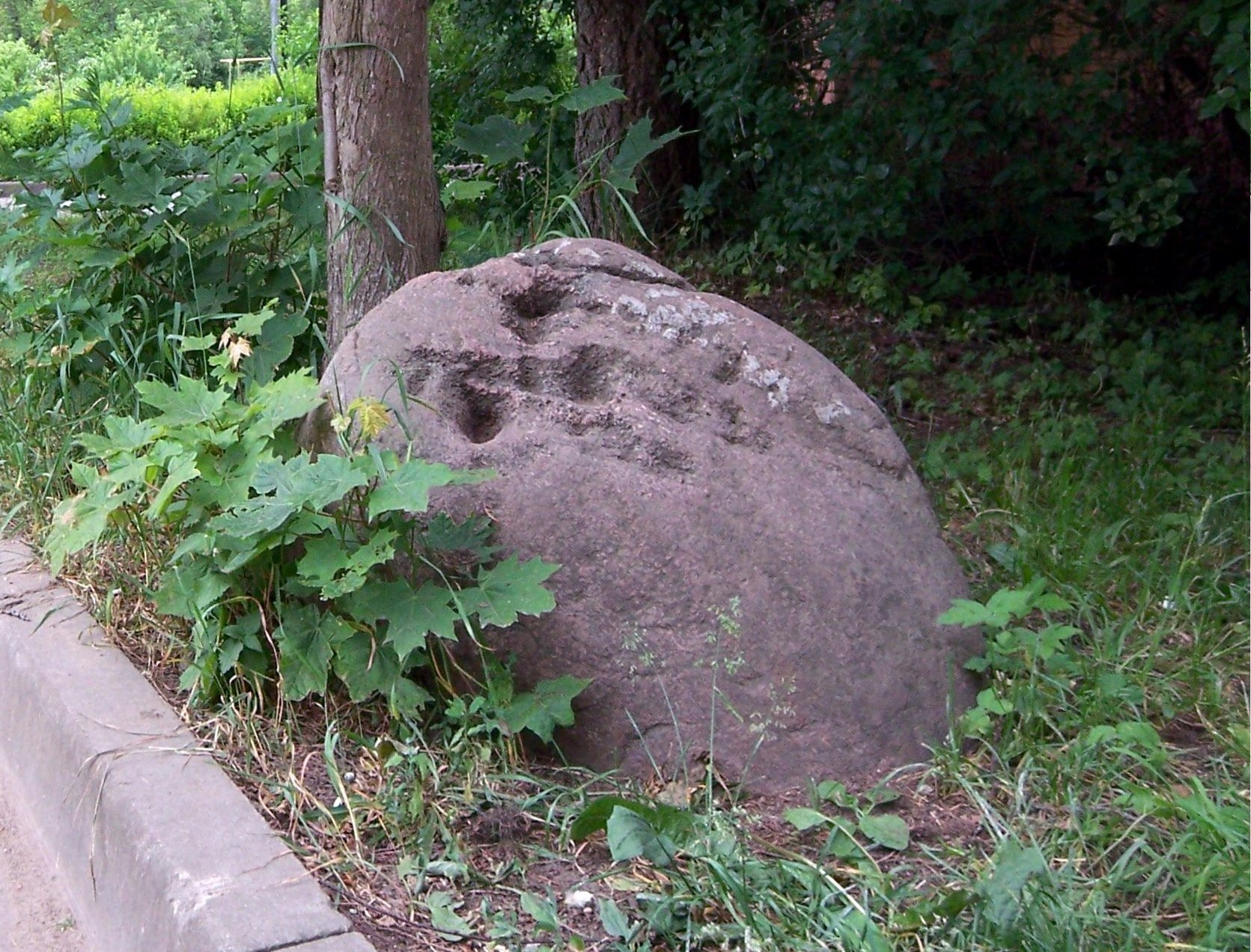
Sledovik Stone from Mendeleevo, Russia

Sledovik (Следовик, in Russian literally – footprint thing) is a most widespread type of sacred stones, venerated in Slavic (Russian, Belarusian, Ukrainian) and Finnic (Karelia, Merya) pagan practices. These are big stones, usually granite boulders of glacier origin, with hollows in them, that frequently bear traces of processing (seem to be artificially deepened and/or widened), and in some cases resemble foot traces, similar to those that might be left by a bare foot on a soft clay-like surface (hence the name). It is not completely clear if the stones were selected for veneration because the hollows resembled foot traces, or whether the hollows were processed to resemble footprints; most probably both interpretations are at least partly applicable.

Sometimes it is hard to draw a line between the Sledovik stone and the so-called Chashechnik stone (Чашечник, literally – a cup-stone), as the only difference between these two is that a typical "cup" hollow does not necessarily need to resemble a trace of a foot. Most probably, both types of stones served the same ritual function, and form a continuum of shapes and modifications.

The majority of Sledovik stones have legends associated with them. In the modern, Christian (or post-Christian) world the majority of these legends say that it was a foot of Jesus (alternatively, the Virgin Mary, or one of the Saints) that left the trace on the stone. In some cases, however, the trace is associated with the Devil, and the stones are considered impure, and harmful.

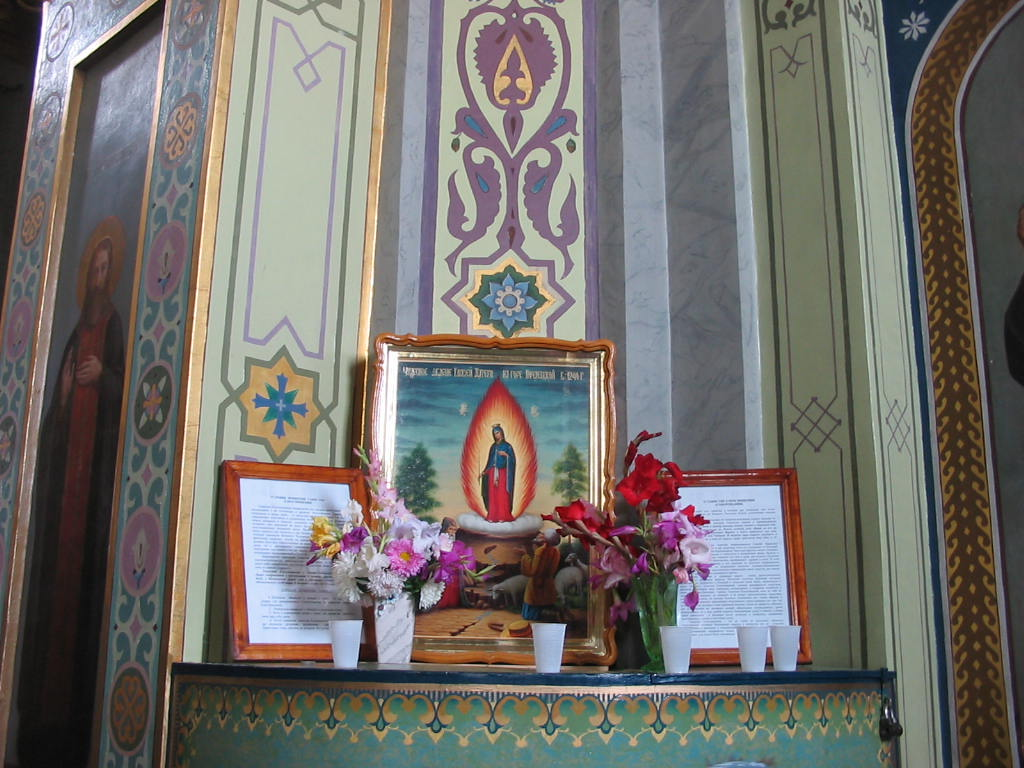
An Icon from Pochaiv Lavra with Virgin Mary leaving her trace on a stone

It is assumed that in the past these stones were used as pagan shrines. It is however unlikely they served as altars, and were used for bloody sacrifices. Rather, more probably, rain water and dew that accumulated in these hollows, was considered sacred, or blessed, and was used in some kinds of rituals. Some of these rituals are still preserved till modern days: thus in Pochaiv Lavra local Sledovik, re-interpreted as a place of epiphany of the Virgin Mary, is venerated as one of the most important relics of the monastery; pilgrims are allowed to drink water that was poured in the footprint, and which thus is considered to become blessed. Those Sledovik and Cup Stones that are located in the wild, but relatively accessible, are in some cases also venerated by the local population, either in the christianized interpretation, or in "alternative", semi-pagan, style. People would usually come to the stones, and leave there food, sweets, icons, or burn church candles. Wish trees can be frequently found near such stones.

== Notable Sledovik and Cup Stones ==
- Gus stone from the Golosov Ravine in Kolomenskoe, Moscow
- Stone in the shrine of Pochaiv Lavra, associated with Virgin Mary
- Sledovik in Pavlovo-Obnorskiy Monastery

== See also ==
- Sieidis - sacred stones of the Finno-Ugric Sami culture
- Sin-Kamen – a simpler type of Slavic/Ugric sacred stone
- Petrosomatoglyph
