= Sergei Abramov (mathematician) =

Russian mathematician (born 1957)

Sergey Abramov
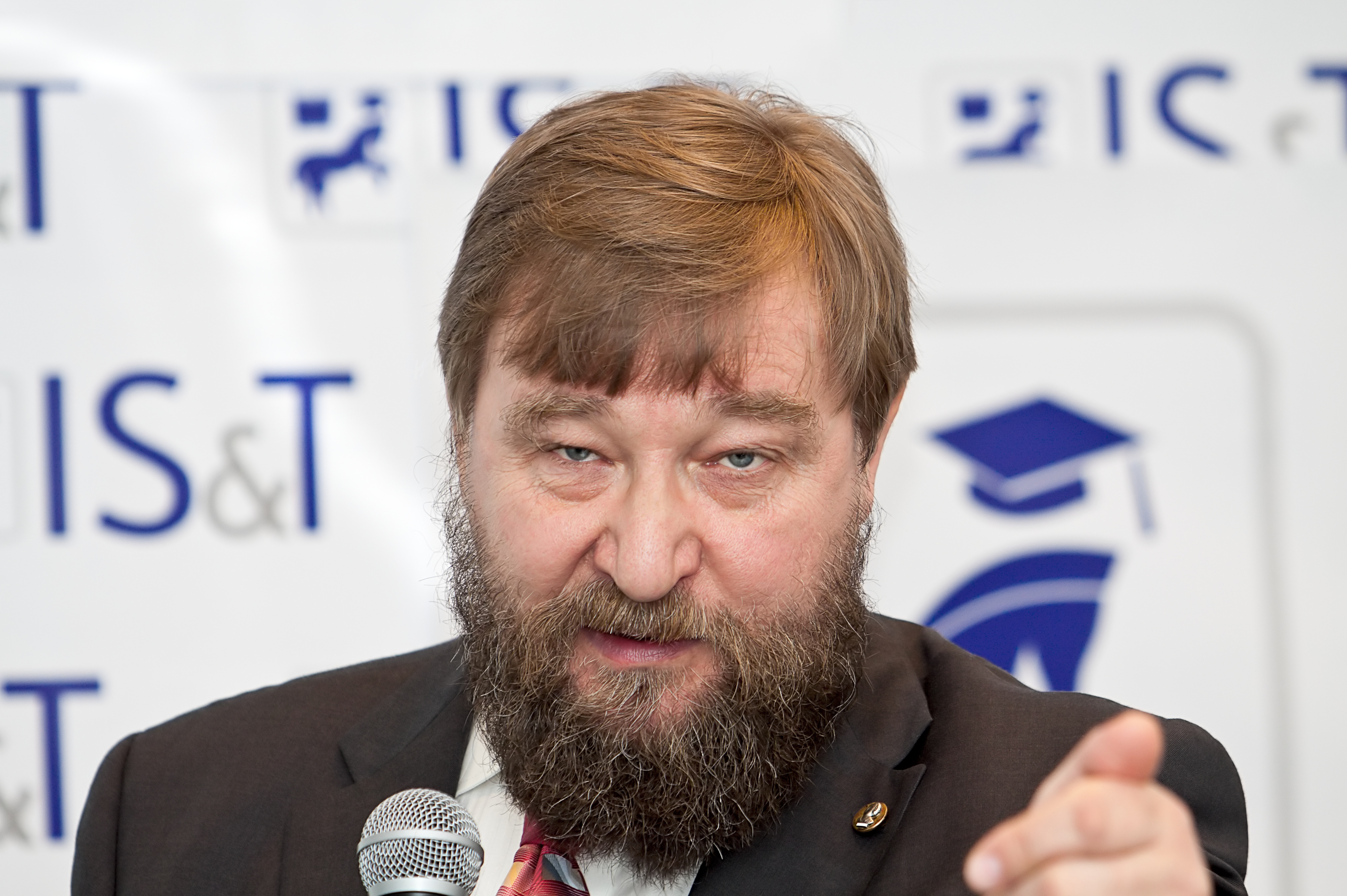
- Born: 25 March 1957 (age 69); Moscow
- Education: Moscow State University (1980)
- Scientific career
- Fields: Mathematics
- Workplaces: Director of the Institute of Program Systems of the RAS

Sergei Mikhailovich Abramov (Russian: Сергей Михайлович Абрамов; born 25 March 1957) is a Russian mathematician, Professor, Dr.Sc., Corresponding Member of the Russian Academy of Sciences, Director of the Institute of Program Systems of the Russian Academy of Sciences, Rector of the University of Pereslavl (2003–2017). Specialist in the field of system programming and information technologies (supercomputer systems, telecommunication technologies, theory of constructive metasystems and meta-calculations).

== Biography ==
He graduated from the faculty MSU CMC (1980).

He presented his thesis «Meta-calculations and their application» for the degree of Doctor of Physical and Mathematical Sciences (1995).

Was awarded the title of Professor (1996), Corresponding Member of the Russian Academy of Sciences (2006).
