= Trubezh =

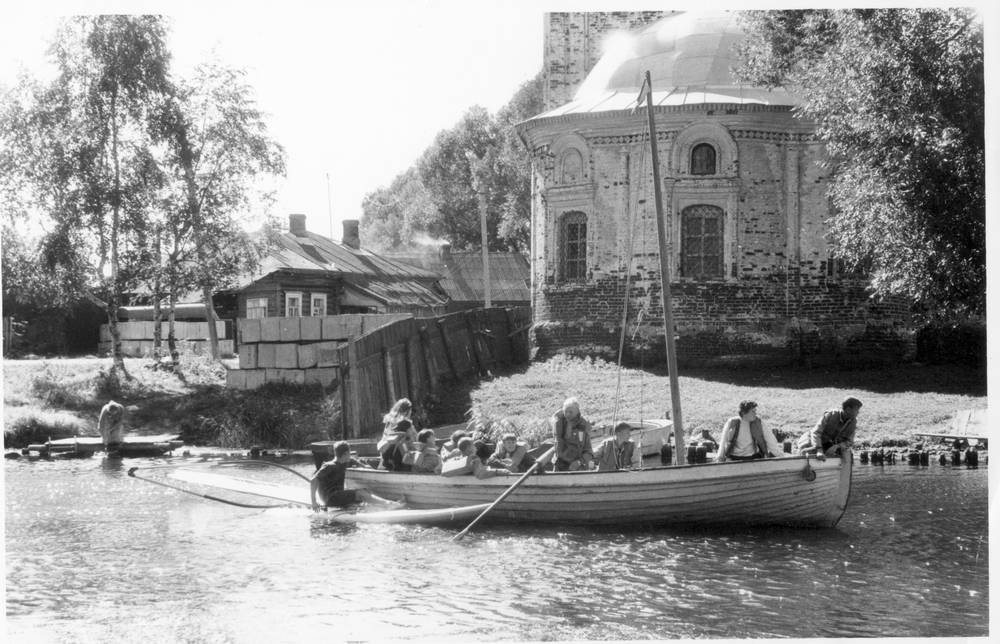

Location
- Country: Russia

Physical characteristics
- Mouth: Lake Pleshcheyevo
  - coordinates: 56°44′04″N 38°49′52″E
- Length: 36 km (22 mi)
- Basin size: 245 km^{2} (95 sq mi)

Basin features
- Progression: Lake Pleshcheyevo→ Vyoksa→ Nerl→ Volga→ Caspian Sea

The Trubezh (Russian: Трубеж) is a river in Yaroslavl Oblast, Russia. It flows to the Lake Pleshcheyevo. Major city: Pereslavl-Zalessky. It is 36 kilometres (22 mi) long, and its drainage basin covers 245 square kilometres (95 mi^{2}).
