= Blue Stone (Russia) =

Russian sacred stone

Coordinates: 56°47′03″N 38°49′27″E

Blue Stone, or Blue Rock (Russian: Синь-камень) is a type of pagan sacred stones, widespread in Russia in areas historically inhabited by both Eastern Slavic (Russian), and Volga Finnic tribes (Merya, Muroma). Unlike Sledovik (both Sledovik proper and Cup-stones), Blue Stones did not have major hollows on them, and were venerated in a simpler way: by pouring water on them, or leaving food offerings. Some of the Blue Stones are still known, and to some extent venerated by local populations.

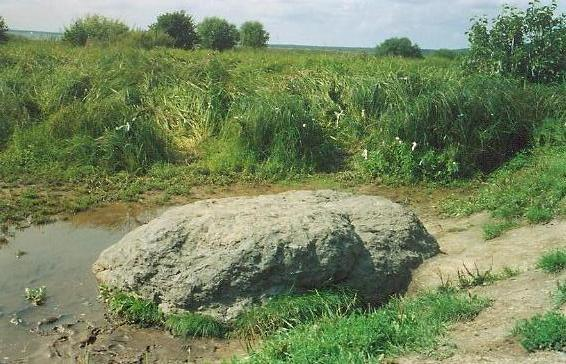
The Sin-Kamen (Blue Rock) near Lake Pleshcheyevo used to be a Meryan shrine

If used as a personal name, Sin-Kamen (Blue Rock) usually refers to the most famous sacred stone of this kind, located on a shore of Lake Pleshcheyevo near Pereslavl-Zalesskiy. While in the majority of cases, the stones belonging to the Blue Stones type are black or dark gray, this particular stone does indeed look dark blue when wet. The stone surface is covered with small knobs; its weight is estimated to be about 12 tons.

Sin-Kamen' is a grey boulder of coarse-grained quartz-biotite schist that used to be venerated by the Meryans and the pagan Slavs on the shore of Lake Pleshcheyevo not far from the early medieval town of Kleshchin. The stone changes its color to blue after a rain, hence the name. It weighs 12 tons and measures 310 by 260 cm. A century ago, the stone used to be as tall as a man but it has steadily sunk into the ground ever since.

Although it is widely believed that the stone was overthrown from a pagan sanctuary on top of Bald Hill at the bidding of Tsar Basil IV, early descriptions locate it in the vicinity of the Pereslavl Monastery of Sts. Boris and Gleb. In the 17th century a local Orthodox monk had it interred in a field. After the stone was scoured by rain, the monks tried to transport it across the ice-bound lake in order to be used as a foundation stone of a church. The ice gave way under its weight and the stone was submerged. It was found on the shore in the 19th century and is now worshipped by a group of local neopagans.

== See also ==
- Boris stones in Belarus
- Sieidis, sacred stones of the Finno-Ugric Sami culture
