= Savva Yamshchikov =

Russian art historian (1938–2009)

- Born: Savely Vasilyevich Yamshchikov; October 8, 1938; Moscow, Soviet Union
- Died: 19 July 2009 (aged 70); Pskov, Russia
- Citizenship: Soviet Union; Russia
- Education: Moscow State University
- Occupations: Restorer; Art historian Essayist
- Years active: 1958–2009
- Spouse: Valentina Ganibalova

Savva "Savely" Vasilyevich Yamshchikov (Russian: Са́вва "Саве́лий" Васи́льевич Ямщико́в; October 8, 1938 – July 19, 2009) was a leading expert on Russian provincial art, particularly medieval icon painting and portrait painting of the 18th and 19th centuries.

Yamschikov graduated from the Moscow University and worked at the All-Russian Art Restoration Center in Moscow. He went from one province to another in order to find medieval icons that required cleansing.

Yamshchikov curated over 300 art exhibitions and first brought to light a number of provincial portraits from Yaroslavl, Rybinsk, Kostroma. It was he who rediscovered such forgotten artists as Grigory Ostrovsky, Dmitry Korenev, and Nikolay Mylnikov. He also advised Andrei Tarkovsky on the production of Andrei Rublev and Sergey Bondarchuk on the production of Boris Godunov.

Yamshchikov spent much of his later life in Pskov, helping preserve medieval architecture of the region. He died in Pskov and was buried in Pushkinskie Gory.

== Works ==
- Yamshchikov, Savva (1966). Древнерусская живопись: Новые открытия (Drevnerusskaya zhivopis': Novye otkrytiya) [Old Russian Painting: Current Findings] (in Russian). Moscow: Sovetsky hudozhnik (Советский художник).
- Yamshchikov, Savva (1976). Русский портрет XVIII—XIX веков в музеях РСФСР (Russkii portret XVIII—XIX vekov v muzeiah RSFSR) [Russian portrait of the 18th–19th centuries in the RSFSR museums] (in Russian). Moscow: Izobrazitel'noe iskusstvo (Изобразительное искусство). pp. 1–248.
- Yamshchikov, Savva (2003). Мой Псков (Moy Pskov) [My Pskov] (in Russian). Pskov. pp. 1–352. ISBN 594542045X.
