= Zalesye =

Historical region of Russia

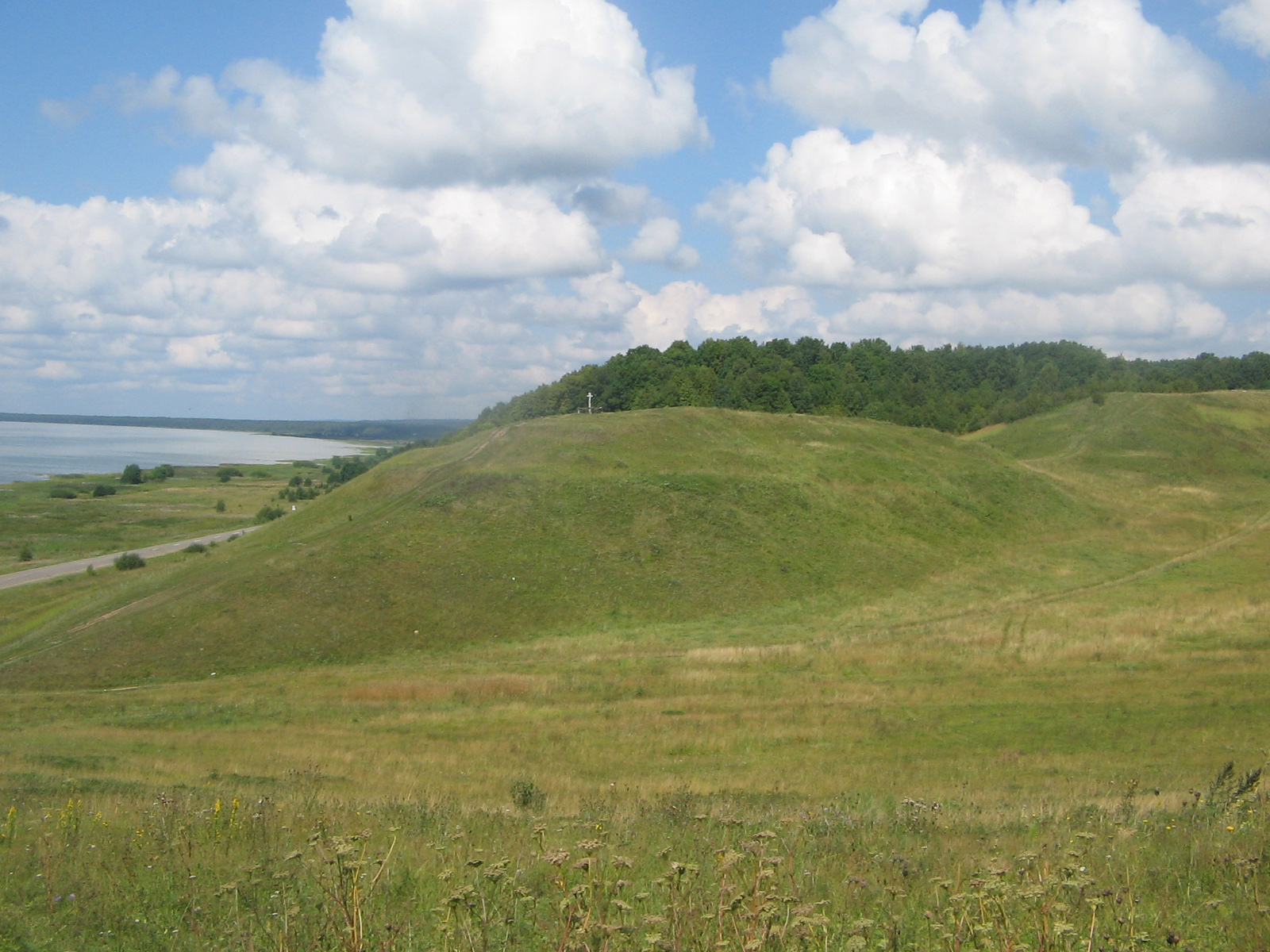
The site of an ancient Meryan sanctuary in Zalesye

Zalesye (Russian: Зале́сье, IPA: [zɐˈlʲesʲjə], lit. area beyond the forest) or Opolye (Russian: Опо́лье, IPA: [ɐˈpolʲjə], lit. area in the fields) is a historical region of Russia, comprising the north and west parts of Vladimir Oblast, the north-east of Moscow Oblast and the south of Yaroslavl Oblast. As the kernel of the medieval state of Vladimir-Suzdal, this area played a vital part in the development of Russian statehood.

== History ==
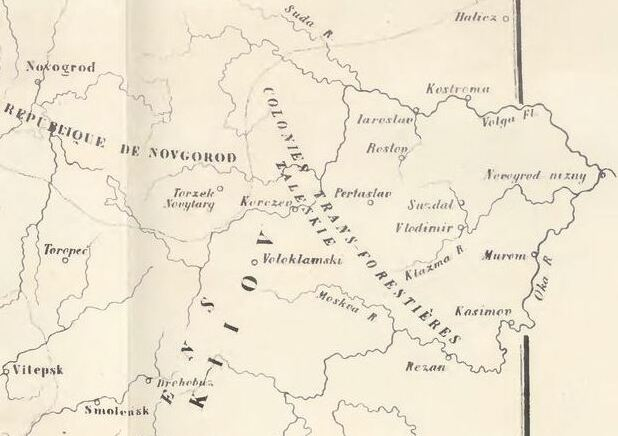
1865 French map showing the "Trans-Forest Colonies" or "Zaleskie" of Kievan Rus' (Kiiov) and the Republic of Novgorod in the year 1139

The name Zalesye alludes to the deep woods that used to separate the medieval Principality of Rostov from the Republic of Novgorod and from the Dnieper principalities. Merians, Muroma, and other Volga Finnic tribes inhabited also the area. There was a strong interaction between the Slavs and Finnic peoples in these territories.

In the twelfth century, this fertile area, being well protected from Turkic incursions by the forests, provided a favourable oasis for Slavic people migrating from the southern borders of Kievan Rus. The population of the area rapidly increased and by 1124 reached the point when Yuri Dolgoruki found it expedient to move his princely seat from Rostov in the Upper Volga Region to Suzdal in Zalesye.

Suzdal was the oldest and most senior town of Zalesye. Yuri established other important urban centres in Pereslavl-Zalessky (founded 1152), Yuriev-Polsky (1152), Dmitrov (1154), Starodub-on-the-Klyazma (1152), Vladimir-Zalessky (1108), Ksnyatin (1136), and Yaropolch-Zalessky (1136). The descriptors Zalessky ("beyond the woods") and Polsky ("in the fields") served to distinguish new cities from their eponyms in the south – in modern-day Ukraine.

Perpetually at odds with the powerful Suzdalian boyardom, Yuri even contemplated moving his capital from Suzdal to the new town of Pereslavl-Zalessky. His unexpected death (1157) forestalled this plan, but Yuri's son Andrew the Pious finally moved the princely seat to another young town, Vladimir, in 1157. The old nobility of Rostov and Suzdal, however, arranged Andrew's assassination (1174) and a brief civil war for supremacy in Zalesye followed.

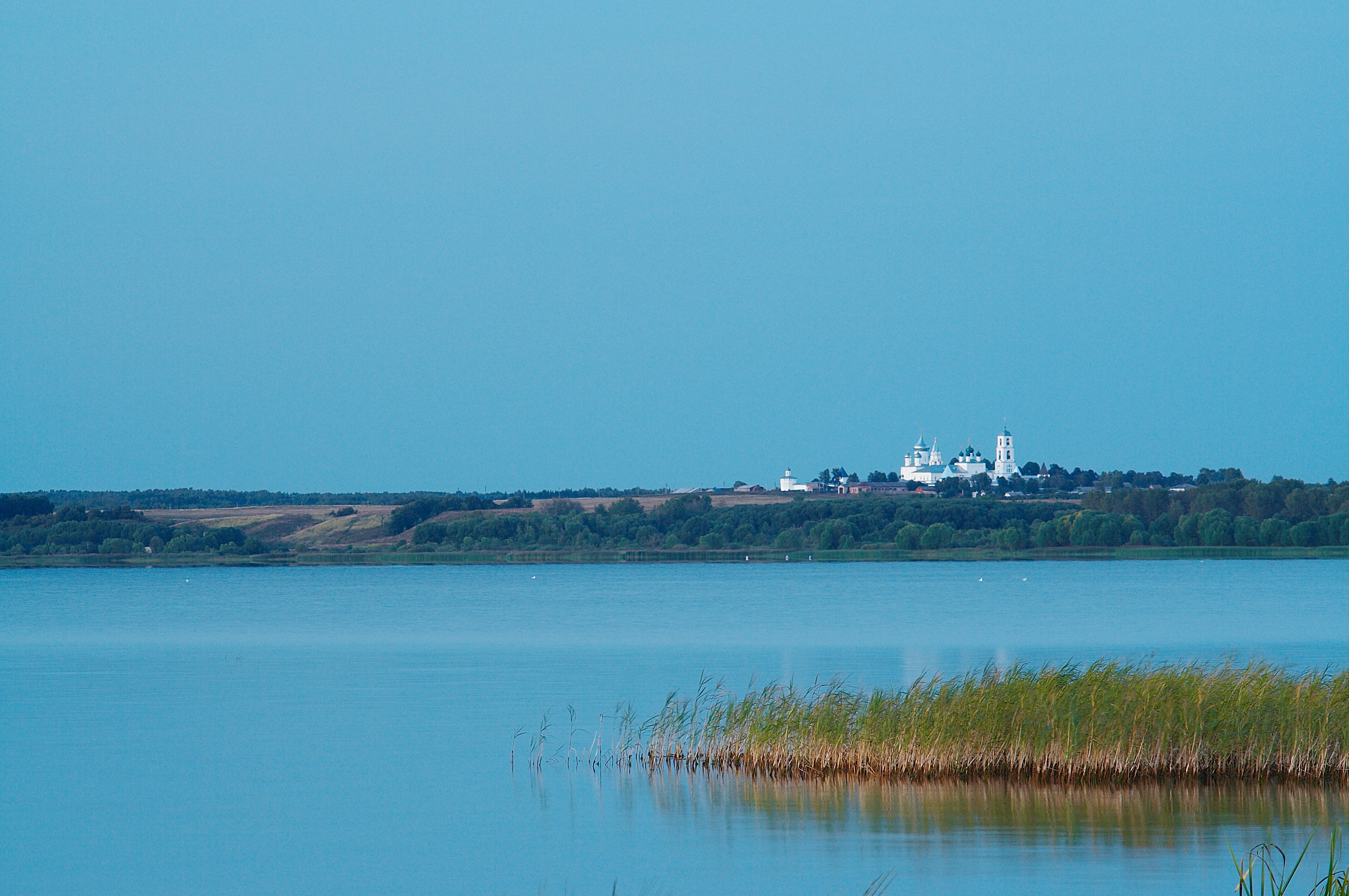
Lake Pleshcheyevo near the Monastery of St Nicetas (2007)

During the Mongol invasion of Kievan Rus' (1223–1240), when the woods were gradually being cleared and new centres developed in Moscow, Tver, and elsewhere, the strategic importance of Zalesye declined. New urban centres developed around famous monasteries (e.g., Sergiev Posad, Kirzhach) or near royal residences (e.g.: Alexandrov, Radonezh).

== See also ==
- Zaporizhzhia (region) – literally meaning "area beyond the rapids" (of the river Dnieper/Dnipro)
