= Grigory Ostrovsky =

Russian painter

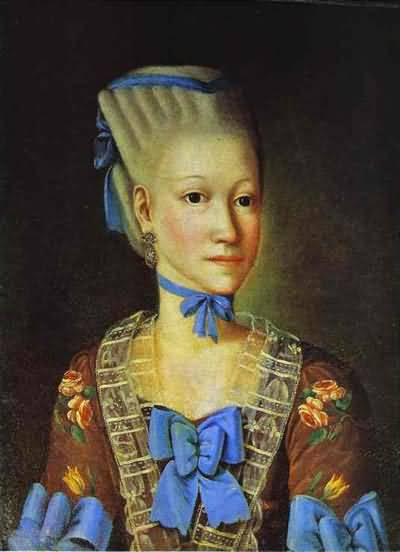
Grigory Ostrovsky, Portrait of Elizaveta Petrovna Cherevina, 1773

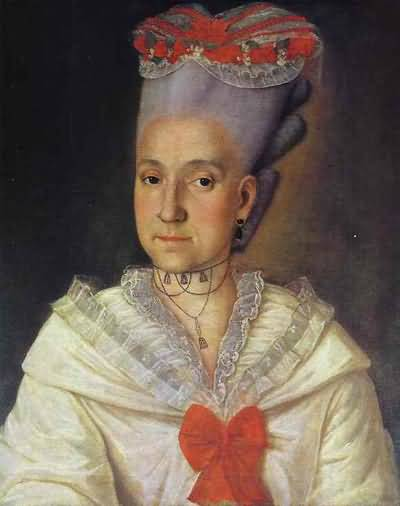
Grigory Ostrovsky, Portrait of an Unknown Woman, 1777

Grigory Silovich Ostrovsky (c. 1756–1814) was a Russian portrait painter active during the 18th century in the Kostroma Governorate.

== Career ==
Almost nothing is known of Ostrovsky's life, and little is known about his career; the only paintings which can be definitively traced to him are 17 signed and dated portraits which were discovered in the 1970s by Savva Yamshchikov. All of the paintings were made in the 1770s and 1780s and come from the Neronovo estate, located about 25 km SE of Soligalich. In the eighteenth century this belonged to the Cherevin family, and most of the portraits are of members of the family. Stylistically, the paintings appear to be the work of an itinerant painter; there is a possibility, too, that he may have studied icon painting. Presumably, Ostrovsky originally was from Veliky Ustyug.

Ostrovsky's paintings are currently held by the Soligalich Regional Studies Museum in Soligalich.
