= Pereslavl-Zalessky =

Town in Yaroslavl Oblast, Russia

Pereslavl-Zalessky Переславль-Залесский
- Town
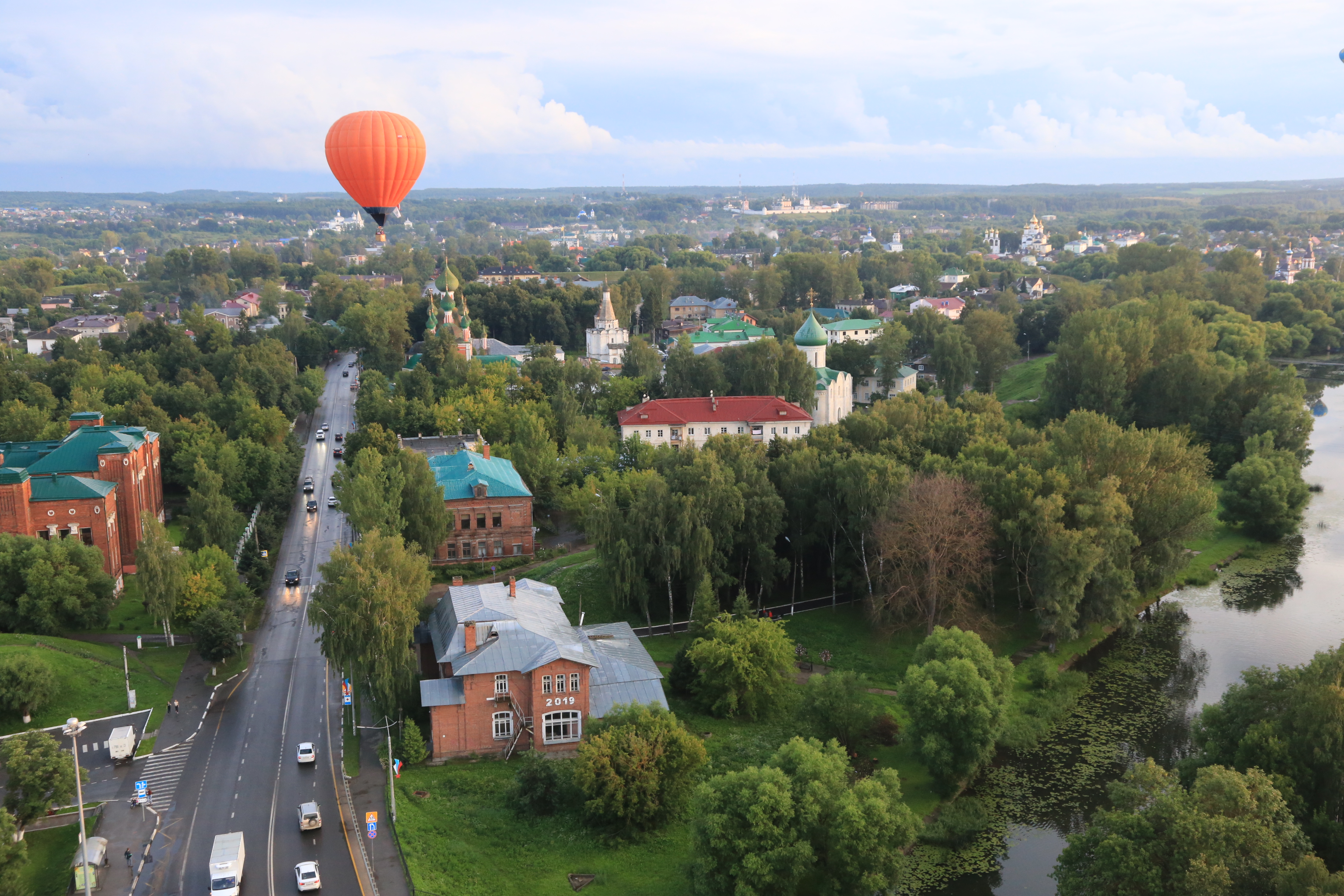
- Pereslavl-Zalessky

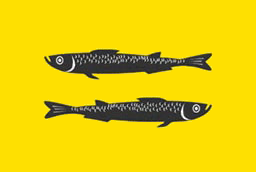
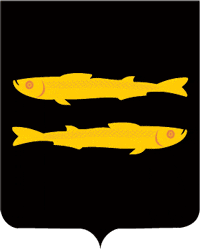
- Flag Coat of arms
- Interactive map of Pereslavl-Zalessky
- Location of Pereslavl-Zalessky Pereslavl-Zalessky (Yaroslavl Oblast)
- Coordinates: 56°44′N 38°51′E
- Country: Russia
- Federal subject: Yaroslavl Oblast
- Founded: 1152

Government
  - Body: Town Duma
  - Mayor: Dmitry Zyablitsky

Area
  - Total: 23.01 km^{2} (8.88 sq mi)
- Elevation: 142 m (466 ft)

Population (2010 Census)
  - Total: 41,925
  - Estimate (2025): 35,956 (−14.2%)
  - Density: 4,343.41/km^{2} (11,249.4/sq mi)

Administrative status
  - Subordinated to: town of oblast significance of Pereslavl-Zalessky
  - Capital of: Pereslavsky District, town of oblast significance of Pereslavl-Zalessky

Municipal status
  - Urban okrug: Pereslavl-Zalessky Urban Okrug
  - Capital of: Pereslavl-Zalessky Urban Okrug, Pereslavsky Municipal District
- Time zone: UTC+3 (MSK)
- Postal code: 152020-152040
- Dialing code: +7 48535
- OKTMO ID: 78705000001
- Website: www.adminpz.ru

Pereslavl-Zalessky (Russian: Переславль-Залесский, IPA: [pʲɪrʲɪˈslavlʲ zɐˈlʲeskʲɪj]), formerly known as Pereyaslavl-Zalessky, or simply Pereyaslavl, is a town in Yaroslavl Oblast, Russia, located on the main Moscow–Yaroslavl road and on the southeastern shore of Lake Pleshcheyevo at the mouth of the Trubezh River. Population: 41,925 (2010 census); 43,379 (2002 census); 42,331 (1989 Soviet census).

== History ==
It was founded in 1152 by George I of Vladimir as a projected capital of Zalesye (lit. 'beyond the woods'). The inhabitants of the nearby town of Kleshchin were relocated to the new town.

Between 1175 and 1302, Pereslavl was the seat of a principality; in 1302, it was inherited by the prince of Moscow following the childless death of Dmitry of Pereslavl's son Ivan. Pereslavl-Zalessky was devastated numerous times by the Mongols between the mid-13th century and the early 15th century. In 1611–1612, it suffered from the Polish invasion.

In 1688–1693, Peter the Great built his famous "fun flotilla" on Lake Pleshcheyevo for his own amusement, including the so-called Peter's little boat (botik), which could be considered the forerunner of the Russian fleet. The Central Naval Museum, which chronicles the history of the Russian fleet, currently houses this scale model boat.

In 1708, the town became a part of Moscow Governorate.

== Geography ==
Pereslavl-Zalessky is located in southern Yaroslavl Oblast, near the border with Moscow Oblast, 140 kilometres (87 mi) northeast of Moscow, and 123 kilometres (76 mi) southwest of Yaroslavl.

=== Climate ===
Climate of Pereslavl-Zalessky is humid continental: long, cold and snowy winters and short, warm and rainy summers. Average temperatures range from −12 °C (10 °F) in January to +18 °C (64 °F) in July.

Climate data for Pereslavl-Zalessky (extremes 1921-present)
Month	Jan	Feb	Mar	Apr	May	Jun	Jul	Aug	Sep	Oct	Nov	Dec	Year
Record high °C (°F)	7.1 (44.8)	7.7 (45.9)	19.6 (67.3)	25.8 (78.4)	32.8 (91.0)	34.8 (94.6)	35.7 (96.3)	35.2 (95.4)	30.1 (86.2)	25.1 (77.2)	14.3 (57.7)	8.5 (47.3)	35.7 (96.3)
Mean daily maximum °C (°F)	−5.2 (22.6)	−4.1 (24.6)	1.9 (35.4)	10.7 (51.3)	18.4 (65.1)	21.6 (70.9)	24.0 (75.2)	21.8 (71.2)	15.7 (60.3)	8.0 (46.4)	0.5 (32.9)	−3.6 (25.5)	9.1 (48.4)
Daily mean °C (°F)	−7.9 (17.8)	−7.5 (18.5)	−2.3 (27.9)	5.5 (41.9)	12.4 (54.3)	16.1 (61.0)	18.5 (65.3)	16.4 (61.5)	11.1 (52.0)	4.9 (40.8)	−1.7 (28.9)	−5.8 (21.6)	5.0 (41.0)
Mean daily minimum °C (°F)	−10.7 (12.7)	−10.5 (13.1)	−5.7 (21.7)	1.0 (33.8)	7.3 (45.1)	11.2 (52.2)	13.6 (56.5)	11.8 (53.2)	7.5 (45.5)	2.5 (36.5)	−3.7 (25.3)	−8.1 (17.4)	1.4 (34.4)
Record low °C (°F)	−38.2 (−36.8)	−35.6 (−32.1)	−29.0 (−20.2)	−19.4 (−2.9)	−5.5 (22.1)	−0.6 (30.9)	4.5 (40.1)	0.8 (33.4)	−6.8 (19.8)	−16.4 (2.5)	−26.6 (−15.9)	−43.7 (−46.7)	−43.7 (−46.7)
Average precipitation mm (inches)	44.9 (1.77)	33.8 (1.33)	31.8 (1.25)	33.6 (1.32)	51.4 (2.02)	76.7 (3.02)	75.8 (2.98)	65.4 (2.57)	58.6 (2.31)	64.2 (2.53)	47.5 (1.87)	44.3 (1.74)	628 (24.71)
Source: pogoda.ru.net

== Administrative and municipal status ==
Within the framework of administrative divisions, Pereslavl-Zalessky serves as the administrative center of Pereslavsky District, even though it is not a part of it. As an administrative division, it is incorporated separately as the town of oblast significance of Pereslavl-Zalessky—an administrative unit with the status equal to that of the districts. As a municipal division, the town of oblast significance of Pereslavl-Zalessky is incorporated as Pereslavl-Zalessky Urban Okrug.

== Science and education ==
The Program Systems Institute of the Russian Academy of Sciences is based in the town. A small, non-state university closely linked to the institute, the University of Pereslavl, existed between 1992 and 2017, when it went bankrupt and was liquidated.

== Sights and architecture ==
The town is a part of the Golden Ring of Russia. Monuments of church architecture include six architecture complex convents and nine churches. Notable historic buildings are:

- white stone Savior's Cathedral (1152–1157)
- Church of Metropolitan Peter (1585)
- Troitse-Danilov Monastery (16th–18th centuries)
- Nikitsky Monastery (16th–19th centuries)
- Feodorovsky Monastery (16th–19th centuries)
- Goritsky Monastery (17th–18th centuries)
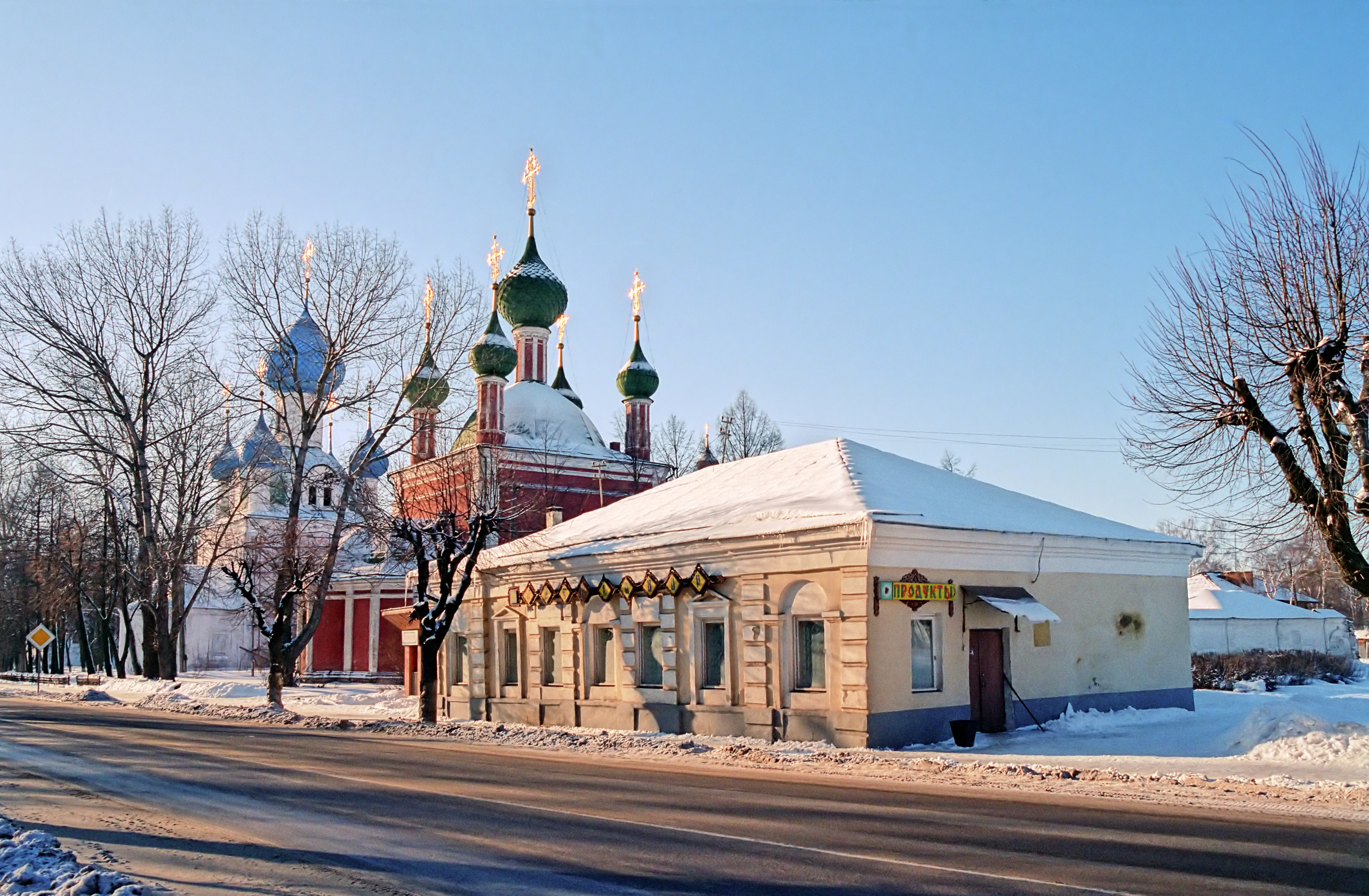
Sovetskaya Street

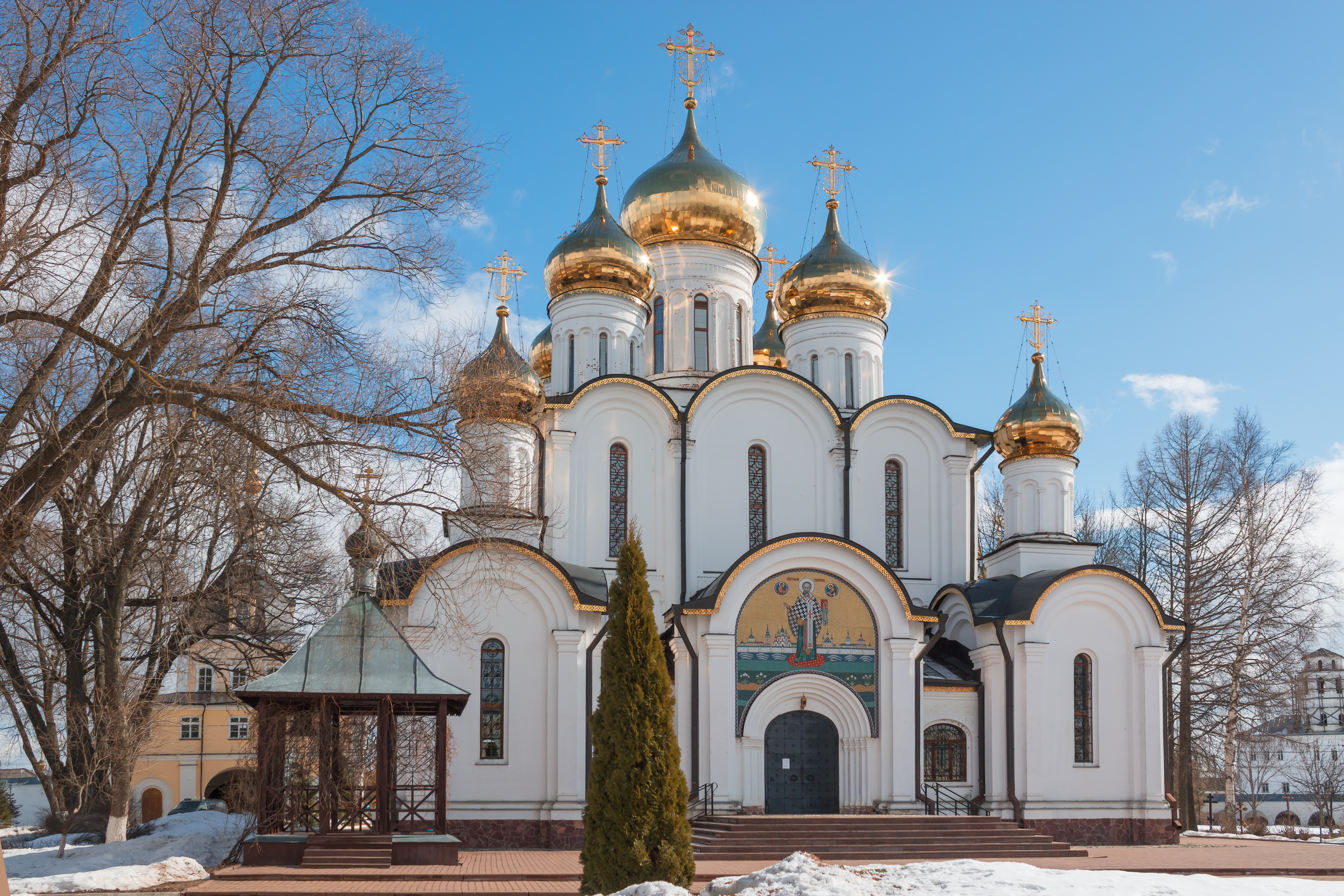
St. Nicholas Monastery was built in the XIVth century

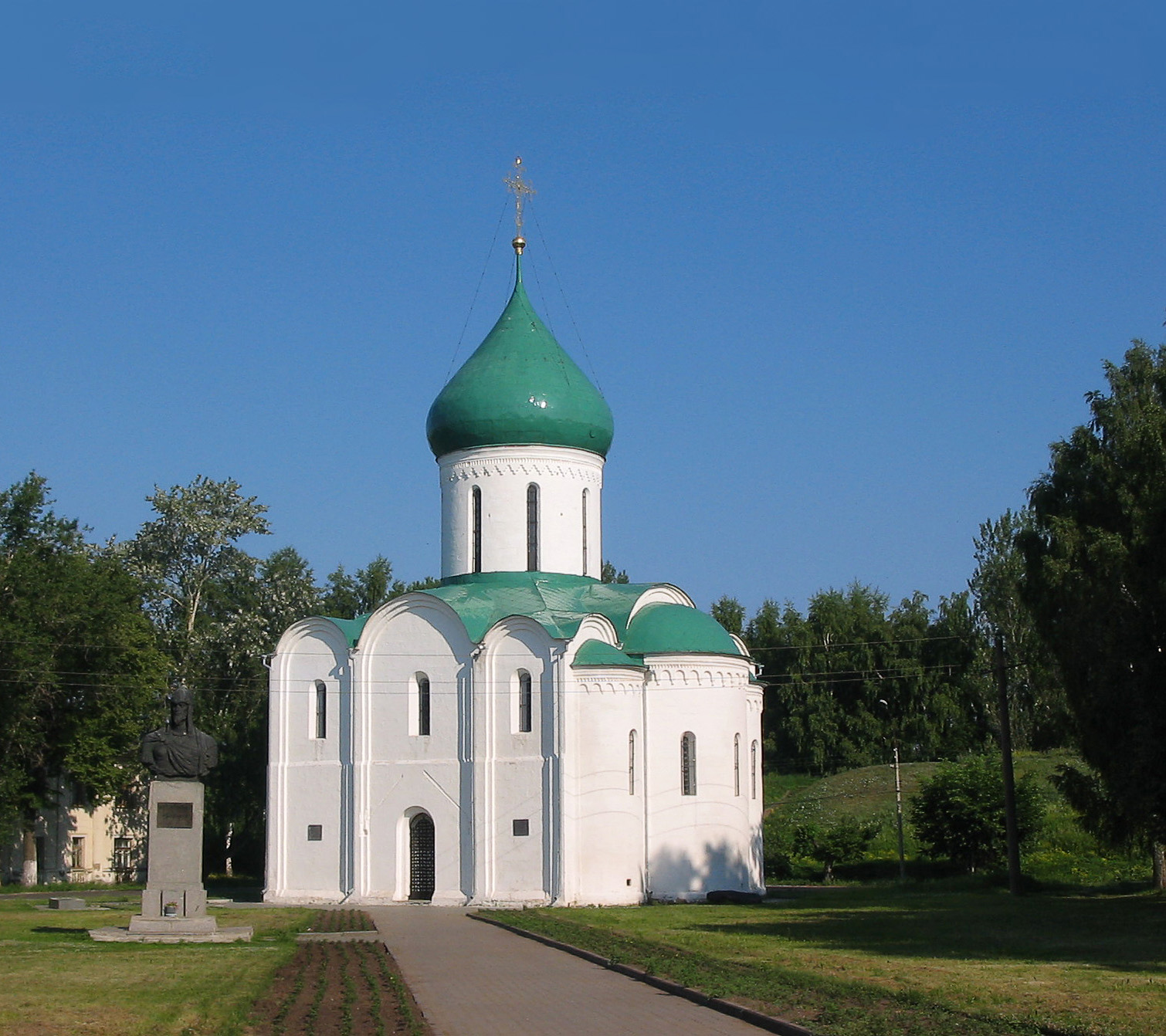
Savior's Cathedral (1152–1157)

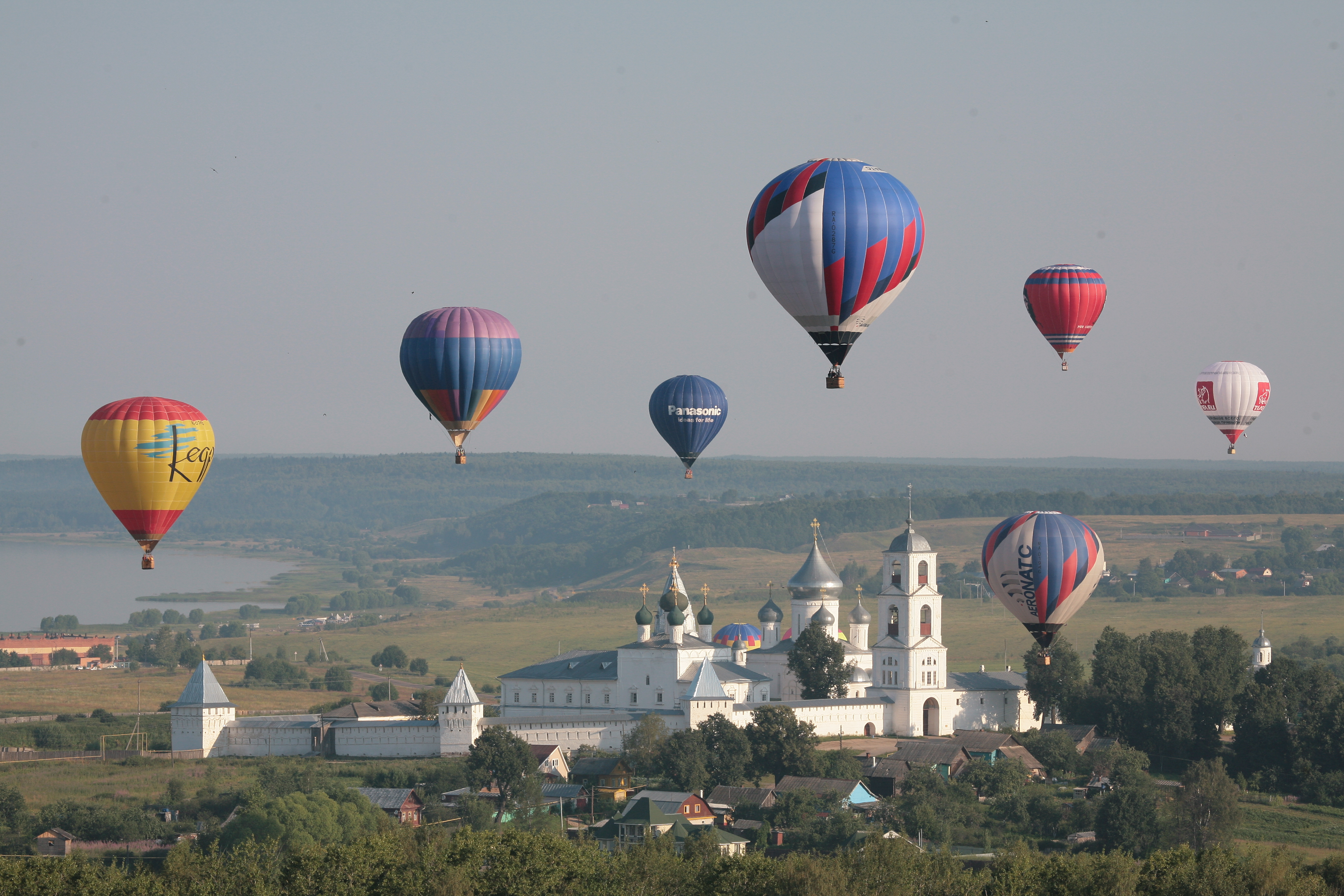
Aeronautics festival over Nikitsky Monastery

Museum and exhibits

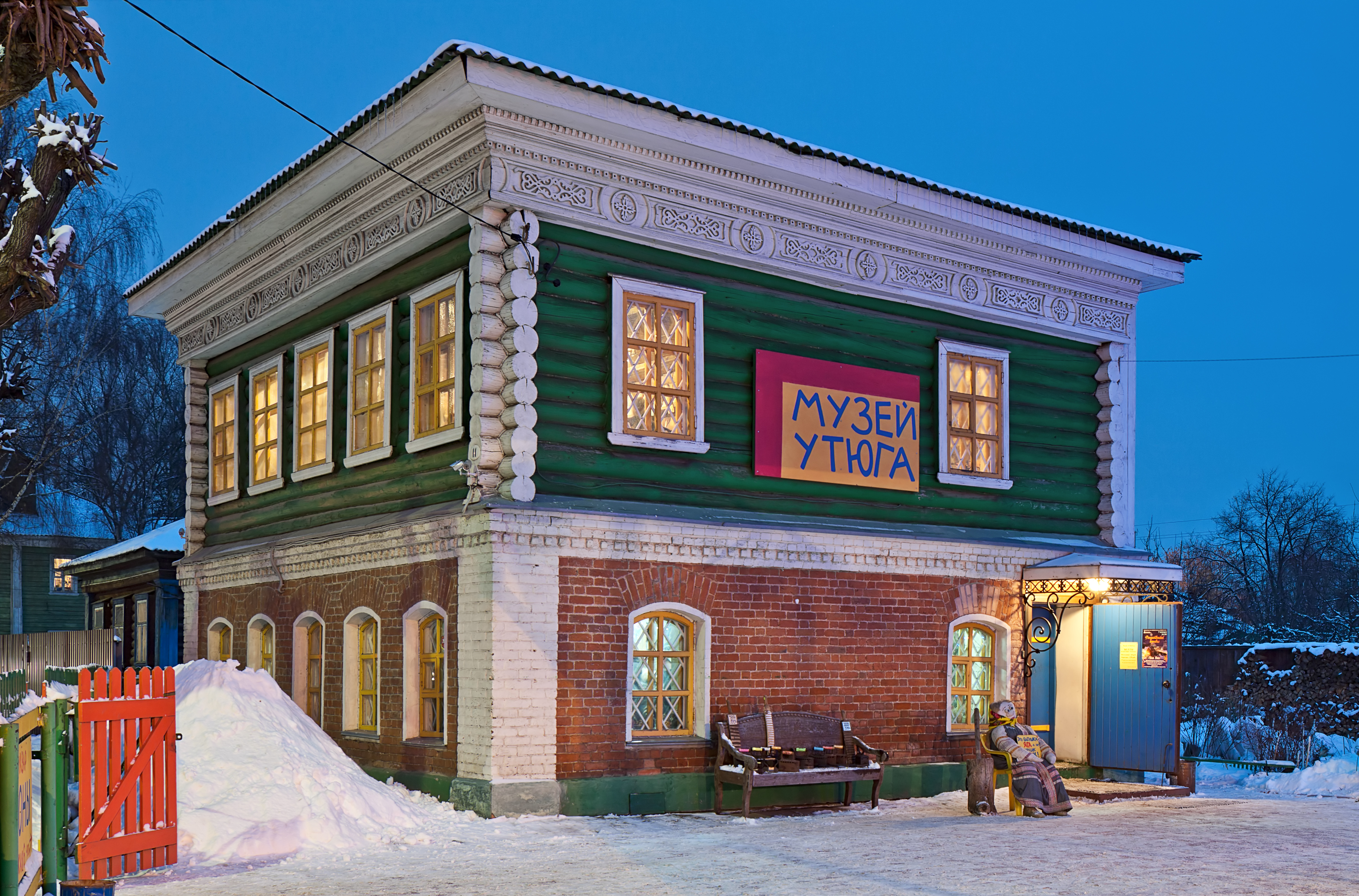
Irons museum in Pereslavl

- Museum-Preserve of Pereslavl-Zalessky (in Goritsky Monastery)
- Museum–Estate "The Little Boat of Peter the Great"
- The Pereslavl Arboretum
- Museum of Flat Irons
- The Museum of Kettles
- The Museum of Steam Engines

The Kleshchin complex, an archaeological monument, is located about 2 kilometers (1.2 mi) from the town proper. The original earthworks (which are still quite substantial) from the defensive wall that circled the town originally are still here, it is possible to walk along these defensive structures. As are portions if the original road that was at its base.

The town sits on the banks of Lake Pleschayevo, a large lake that draws tourists throughout the season. Kite surfing is particularly popular, as is camping.

== Notable people ==
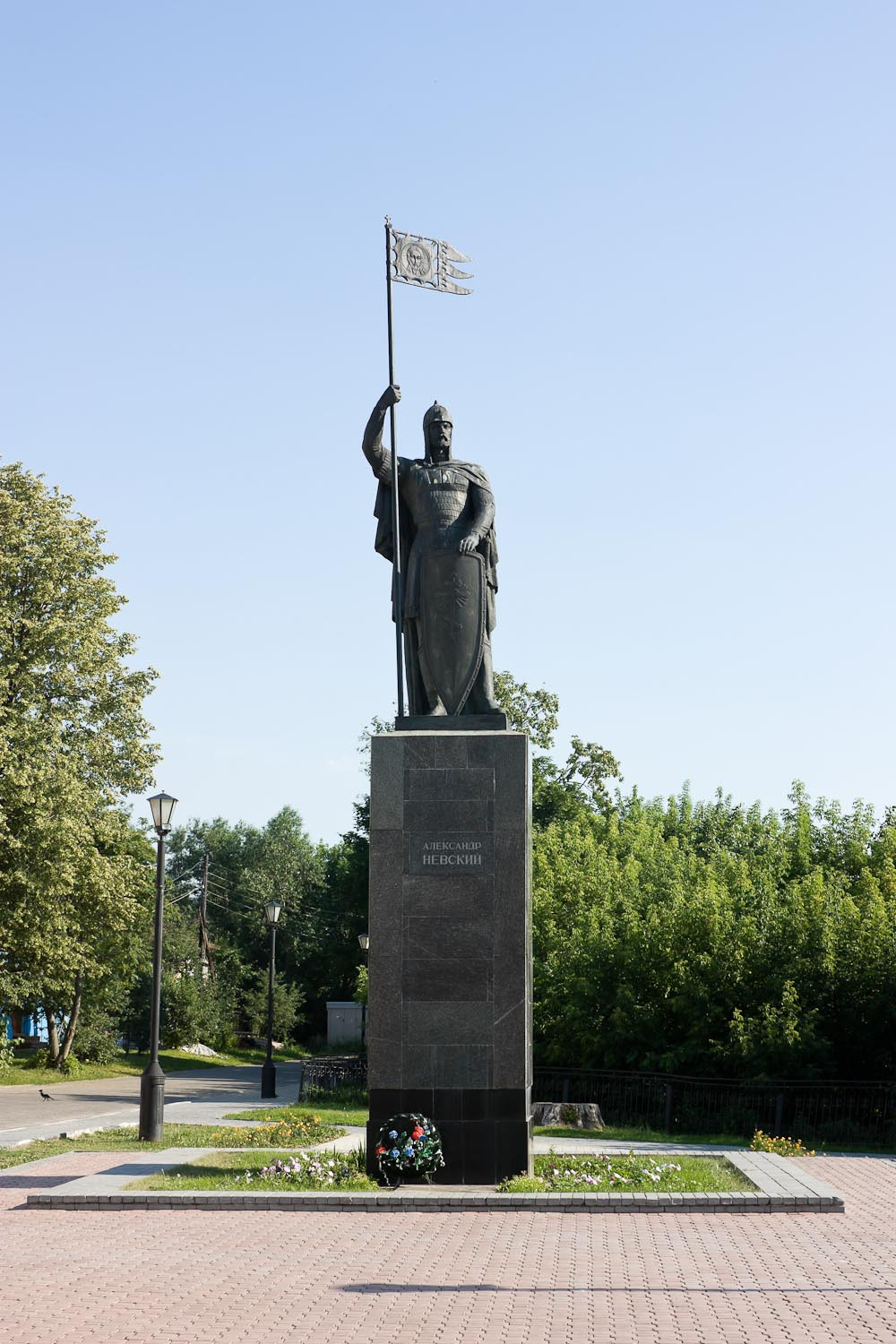
Statue of Alexander Nevsky in Gorodets

- Nicetas Stylites, (??-1186) a 12th-century Russian saint who founded the Monastery of St. Nicetas
- Alexander Nevsky, (1221–1263) prince and saint.
- Pavel Kolendas, (1820-??) Russian portrait painter
- Dmitry Mirimanoff (1861–1945) mathematician, contributed to axiomatic set theory
- Dmitry Kardovsky, (1866–1943) an artist, illustrator and stage designer.
- Leonid Kurchevsky, (1890–1937 or 1939) a Russian/Soviet weapons designer.
- Mikhail Koshkin, (1898–1940) designed the T-34 tank
- Alexander Petrov, (born 1987) actor
