= Meryans =

Ancient Finnic-speaking people of the Upper Volga region

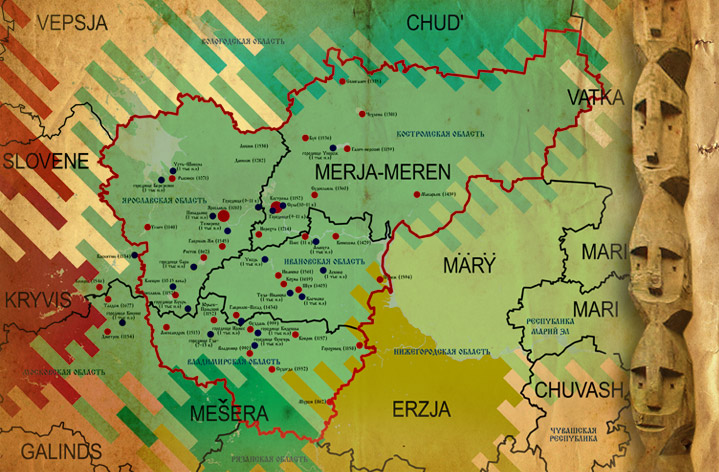

Total population
- Assimilated into Russians; however, some people have begun to identify as Meryan again

Languages
- Meryan (reconstructed form), Russian

Related ethnic groups
- Finnic peoples, Mari people

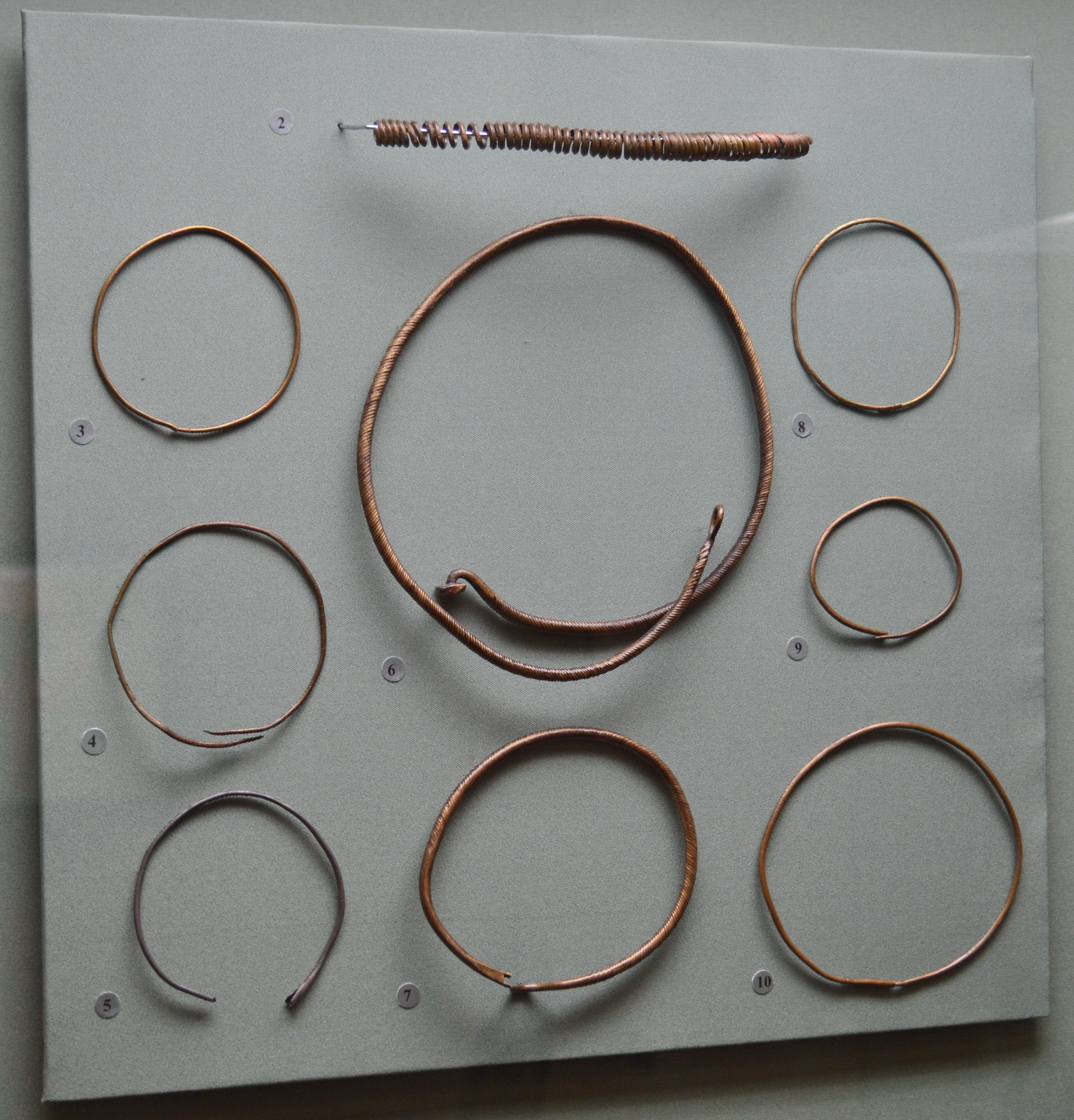
Merya jewellery, 10th century

The Meryans (Russian: меряне, romanized: meryane) or Merya people (Russian: меря, romanized: merya) were an ancient Finnic people that lived in the Upper Volga region. The Primary Chronicle places them around the Nero and Pleshcheyevo lakes. They were assimilated by the Russians by the 17th century, but there has been a modern revival of Meryan culture and language, termed Meryan ethnofuturism.

== History ==
Jordanes mentioned "Merens" as a nation paying tribute to the Gothic ruler Ermanarich. According to the Primary Chronicle, the Varangians also forced the Meryans to pay tribute. This event is dated to 859, although the chronology is not reliable. Oleg of Novgorod forced the Meryans to take part in his 882 campaigns against Smolensk and Kiev. They are also mentioned as the participants of Oleg's campaign against Constantinople in 907.

Merya began to be assimilated by East Slavs when their territory became incorporated into Kievan Rus' in the 10th century. The Life of Abraham of Galich claims that, when arriving to the Lake Galich in the 14th century, he found there some "pagan people called Merya".

The Meryans were an important part of the development of the Russian nation. The sites of Sarskoye Gorodishche near Lake Nero and island Nero and Kleshchin near Lake Pleshcheyevo were formerly proposed as Meryan "capitals", although this notion has been largely abandoned. A large boulder supposedly venerated by the Merya survives near Kleshchin (see Blue Stone).

== Language ==
Not a single word of the Merya language was documented. The Meryans mostly lived around rivers, and many river hydronyms are still of Meryan origin.

Based on toponyms, onomastics and words in Russian dialects some people have tried to reconstruct the key features of the Meryan language. The first reconstructions were done in 1985 by O. B. Tkachenko. The latest book about Merya reconstructions was published in 2019.

The Meryans are thought to have been closely connected with the Muroma people (whose language has even been suggested to have been a dialect of Meryan). Rahkonen claims that the eastern Volkhov Chudes were very close to Meryans, culturally and linguistically.

== Contemporary developments ==
Some people from the former Meryan territory have recently began to identify themselves as "Meryan", which is inspired by genetic links to the Meryan people. In 2010 a film was made about the Neo-Meryan people. In Moscow there exists a "Meryan society", and Meryan festivals have been done in Moscow. In 2010, the Neo-Meryans were featured in the award-winning film Silent Souls.
