= Nikolai Mylnikov (footballer) =

Russian footballer and official

Personal information
- Full name: Nikolai Vladimirovich Mylnikov
- Date of birth: 13 September 1977 (age 49)
- Height: 1.70 m (5 ft 7 in)
- Position: Midfielder

Team information
- Current team: FC Orenburg (U21 administrator)

Youth career
- FC Uralmash Yekaterinburg

Senior career*
Years	Team	Apps	(Gls)
1995	FC Gornyak-Vanadiy Kachkanar	13	(0)
1996	FC Uralmash-d Yekaterinburg	19	(6)
1997–2001	FC Uralmash Yekaterinburg	91	(4)
2001	FC Uralets Nizhny Tagil	17	(2)
2002–2003	FC Metallurg-Metiznik Magnitogorsk	57	(1)
2004–2009	FC Gazovik Orenburg	161	(10)

Managerial career
- 2016–: FC Orenburg (U21 administrator)
- * Club domestic league appearances and goals

Nikolai Vladimirovich Mylnikov (Russian: Николай Владимирович Мыльников; born 13 September 1977) is a Russian professional football official and a former player. He works as an administrator for the Under-21 squad of FC Orenburg.

== Club career ==
He played in the Russian Football National League for FC Uralmash Yekaterinburg in 1997.
