= Lake Pleshcheyevo =

Glacial lake in Yaroslavl Oblast, Russia

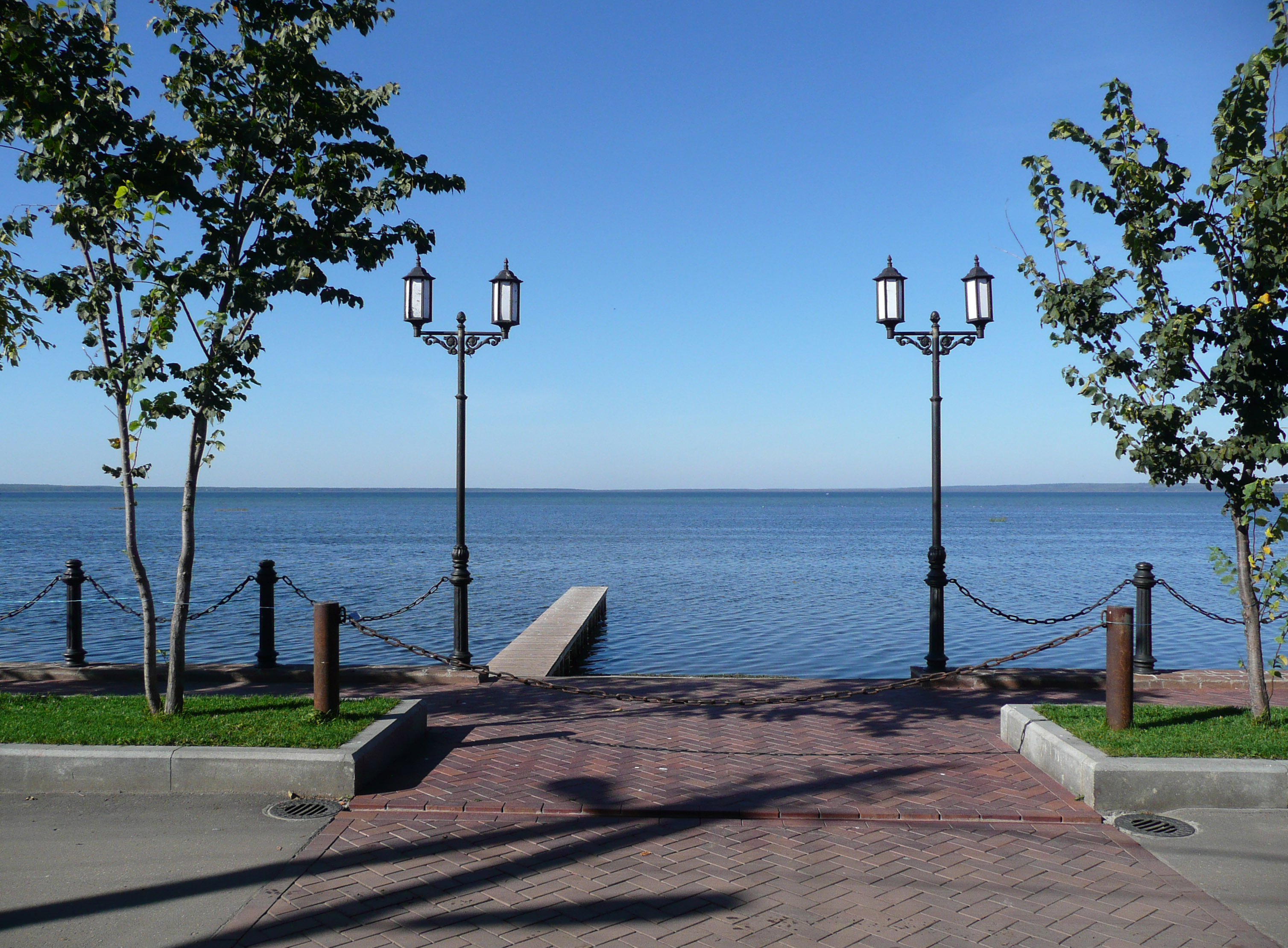

- Location in Russia
- Location: Yaroslavl Oblast
- Coordinates: 56°45′59″N 38°47′04″E
- Primary inflows: Trubezh
- Primary outflows: Vyoksa→ Nerl
- Basin countries: Russia
- Surface area: 51 km^{2} (20 sq mi)
- Settlements: Pereslavl-Zalessky

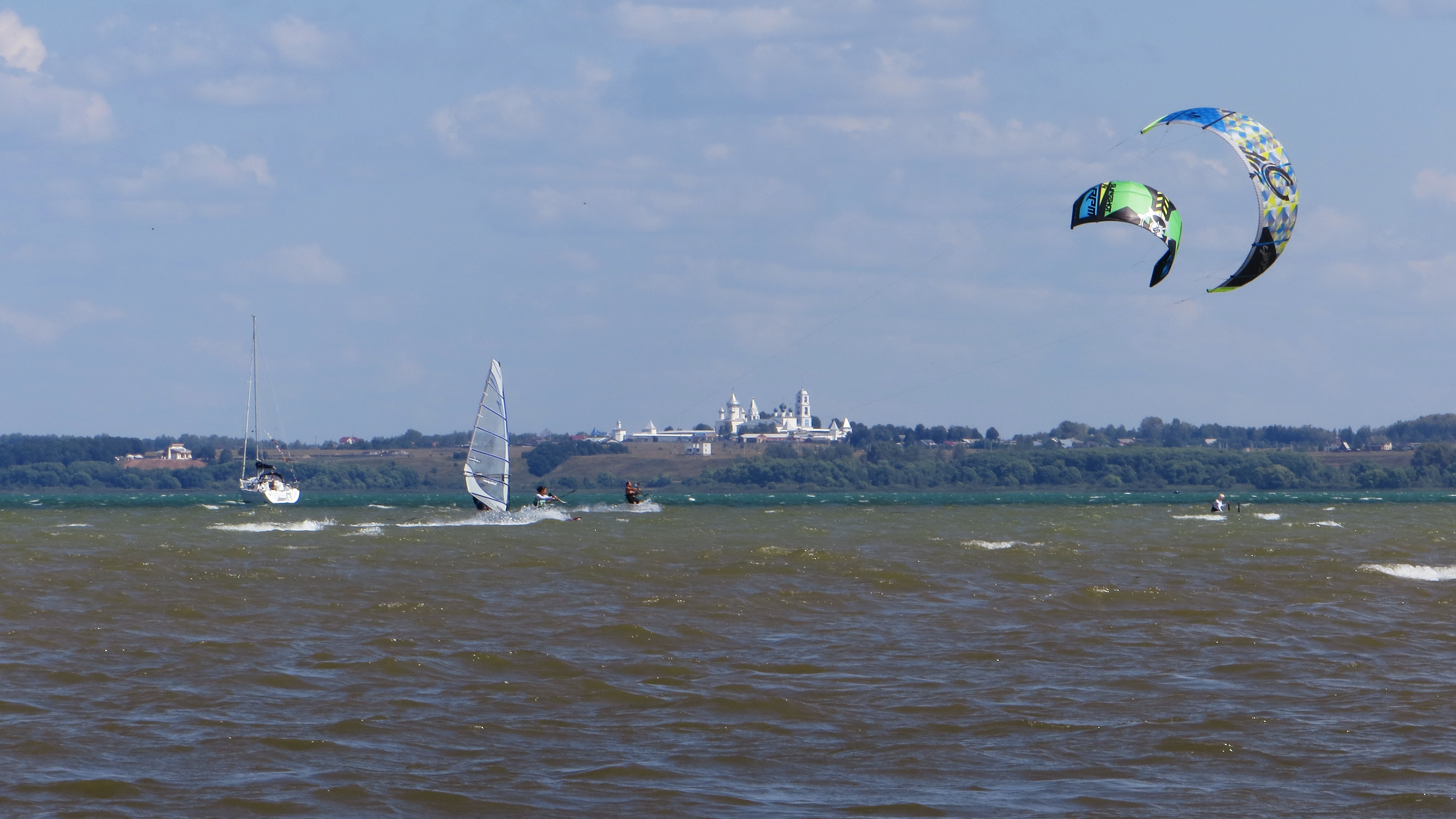
Lake Pleshcheyevo near the whitewalled Monastery of St Nicetas

Lake Pleshcheyevo (Russian: Плеще́ево о́зеро, IPA: [plʲɪˈɕːejɪvə ˈozʲɪrə]) is a glacial lake in Yaroslavl Oblast, Russia. The historic town of Pereslavl-Zalessky is on the southeastern side of the lake.

The lake, which is part of Pleshcheyevo Ozero National Park, covers an area of over 51 km^{2}, its length being 9.5 kilometres (5.9 mi) and its shoreline 28 kilometres (17 mi). Although it is 25 metres (82 ft) deep in the middle, the waters near the shore are quite shallow. The lake is well known for camping, swimming, fishing, and hot air ballooning.

== History ==
The Primary Chronicle refers to the Lake of Kleshchin, which was a Meryan town on its shore. The major relic of Kleshchin is a legendary twelve-ton boulder, the "Blue stone", which was worshipped by pagans in centuries past, and is still a venue for celebrating Russian Orthodox holidays.

In 1688–1693, Peter the Great built his famous "funny flotilla" (i. e. training flotilla) on Lake Pleshcheyevo for his own amusement, including the so-called Peter's little boat, which would be considered one of the forefathers of the Russian fleet. The Botik (small boat) museum in Pereslavl-Zalessky chronicles the history of the first Russian fleet and keeps one of the original ship models.

In 1925, author Mikhail Prishvin spent a year at a research station near the lake and wrote up his observations of the landscape in his work The Springs of Berendey.

== Fishing ==
The lake is noted for its associations with vendace, or "freshwater herring" (ryapushka in Russian). Pereslavl's coat of arms has two golden ryapushka on a black ground. This town was known in the Middle Ages for exporting smoked ryapushka, which was the favorite fish at the Tsars' table.

== See also ==
- List of lakes of Russia
- Neva Yacht Club
