= Nikolay Dmitrievich Mylnikov =

Russian painter

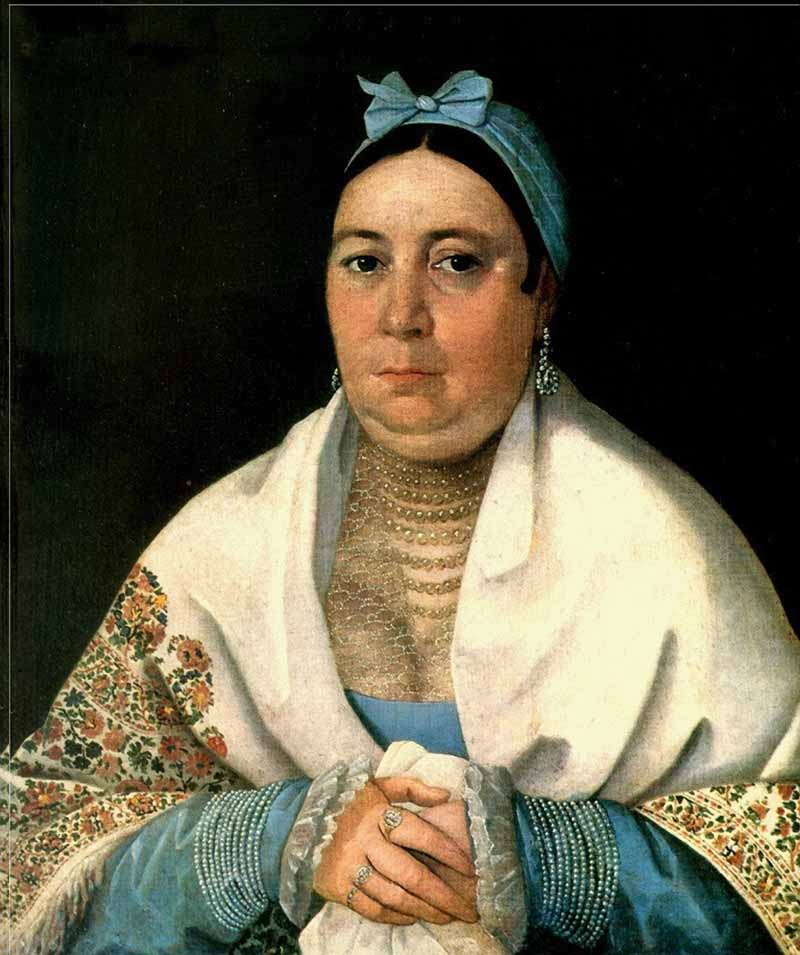
Portrait of Praskovia Ivanovna Astapova, 1827

Nikolay Dmitrievich Mylnikov (Russian: Никола́й Дмитриевич Мы́льников; born Yaroslavl, 1797 – died there, 1842) was a Russian portrait painter active during the nineteenth century in the Yaroslavl Governorate.

Together with Grigory Ostrovsky and Ivan Tarkhanov, Mylnikov belongs to a group of "naive" portrait painters from the Upper Volga region that was rediscovered by Savva Yamshchikov in the 1970s.

Mylnikov's only surviving works appear to be a series of portraits of citizens of Yaroslavl, currently held in the Yaroslavl Art Museum; these include several depictions of merchants and their wives and children, as well as a pair of portraits painted for a local landowner.
