= Severodvinsk =

City in Arkhangelsk Oblast, Russia

Severodvinsk Северодвинск
- City
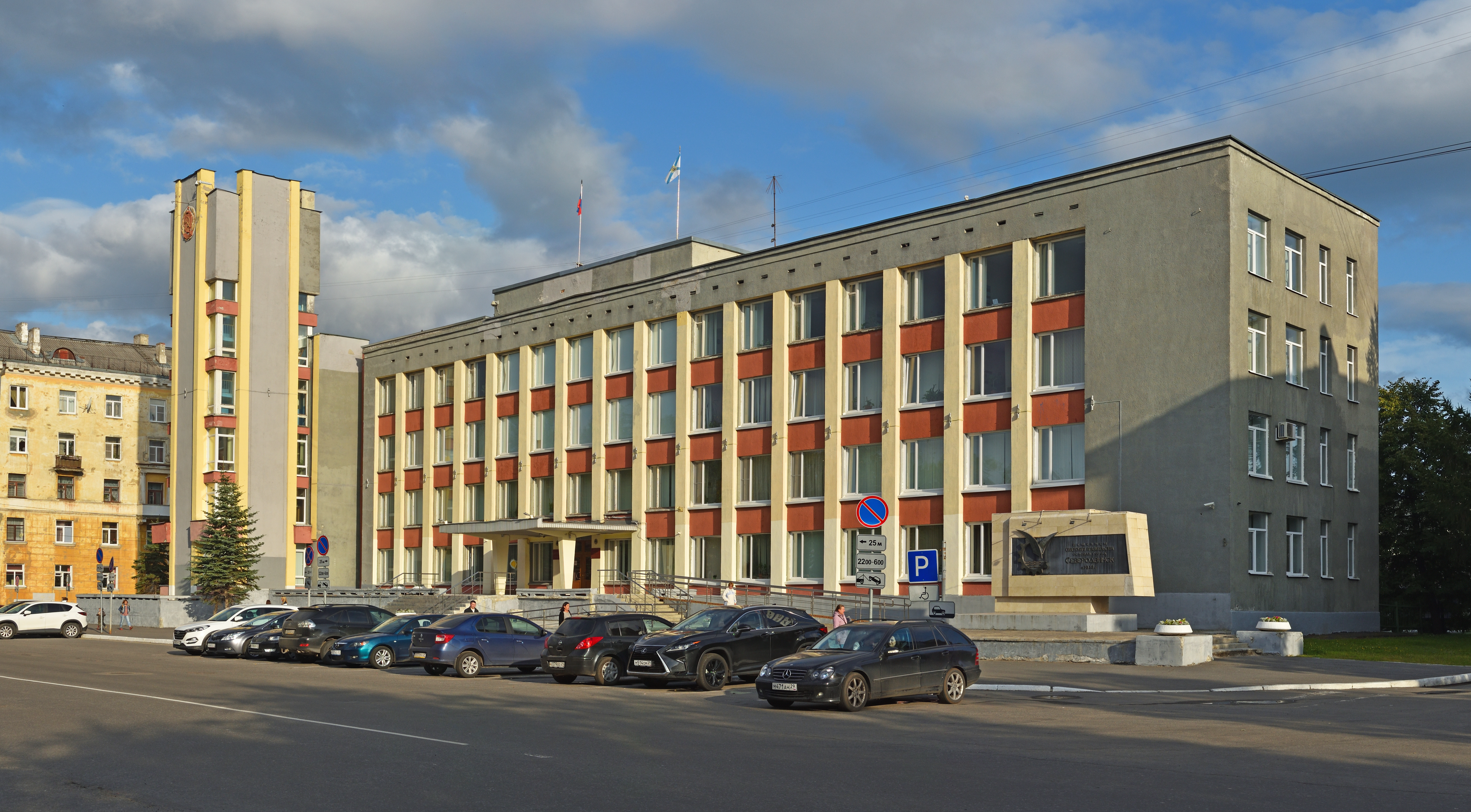
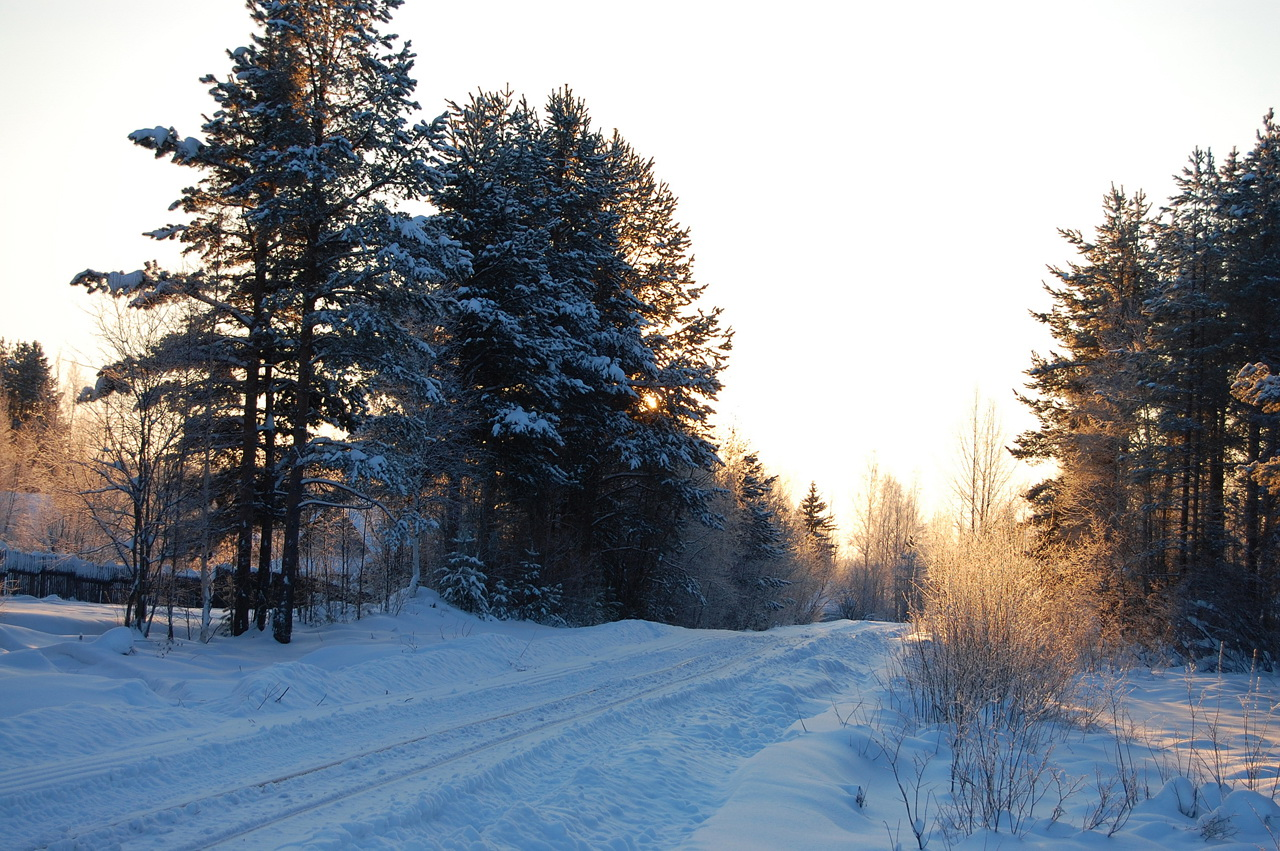
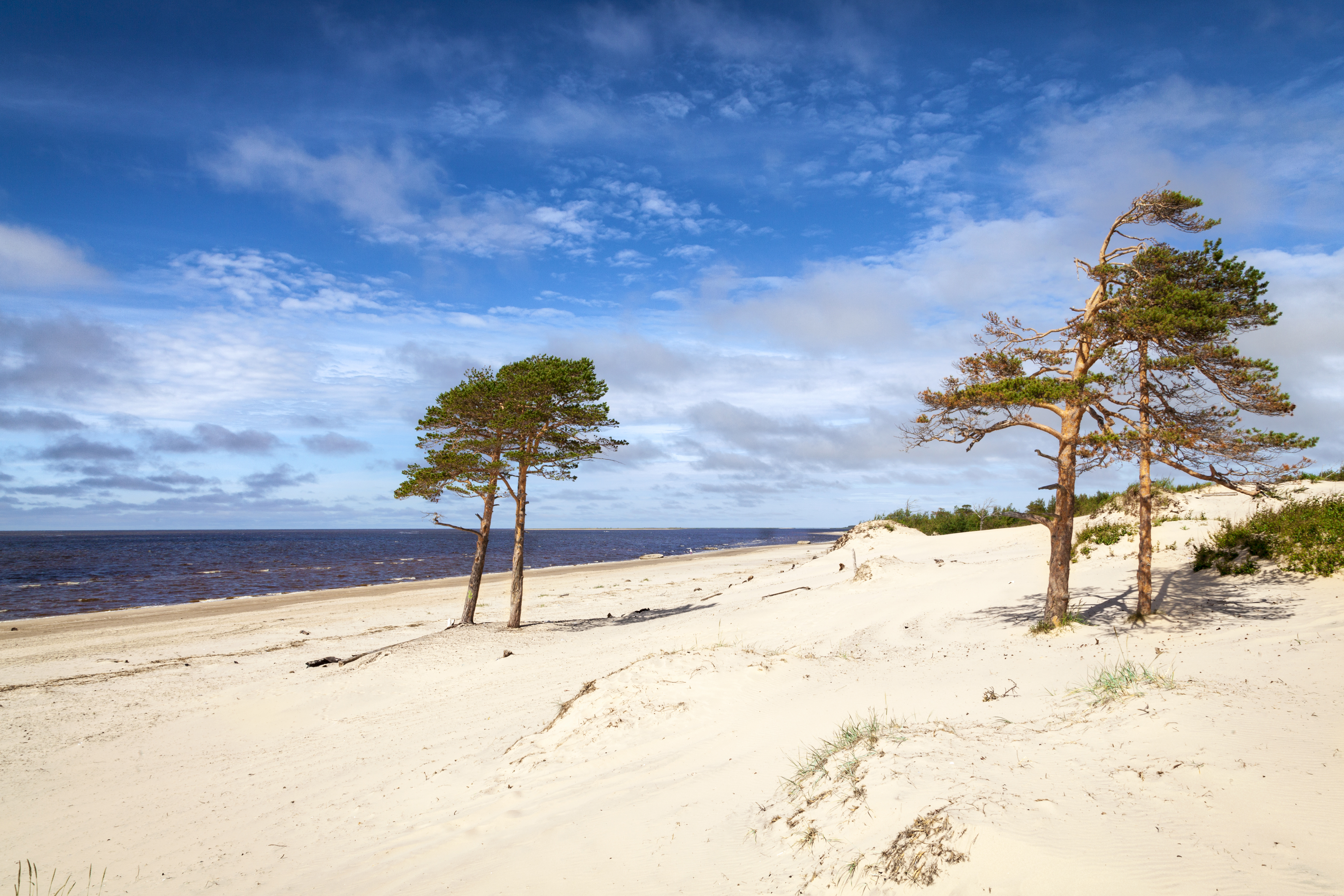
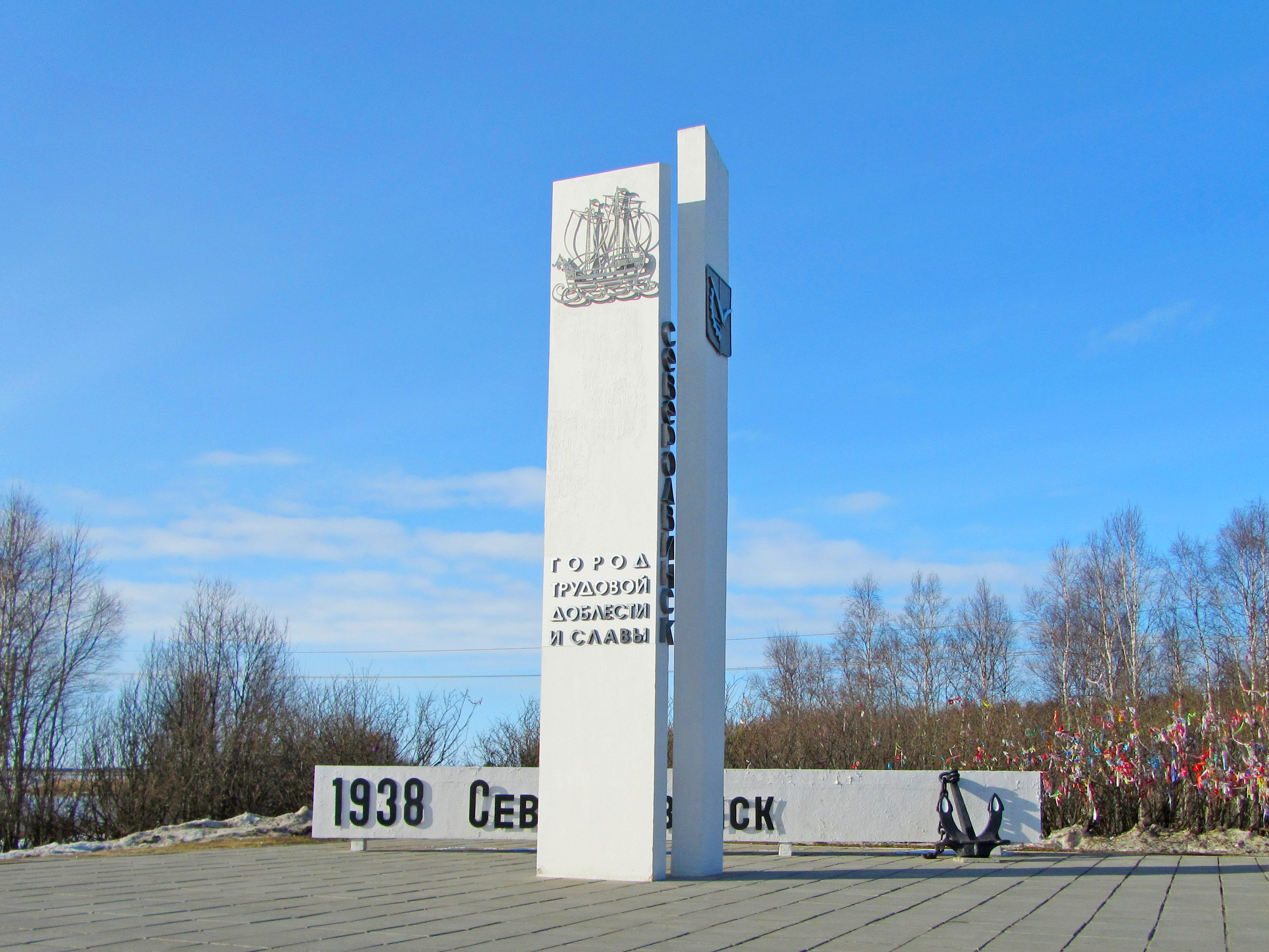
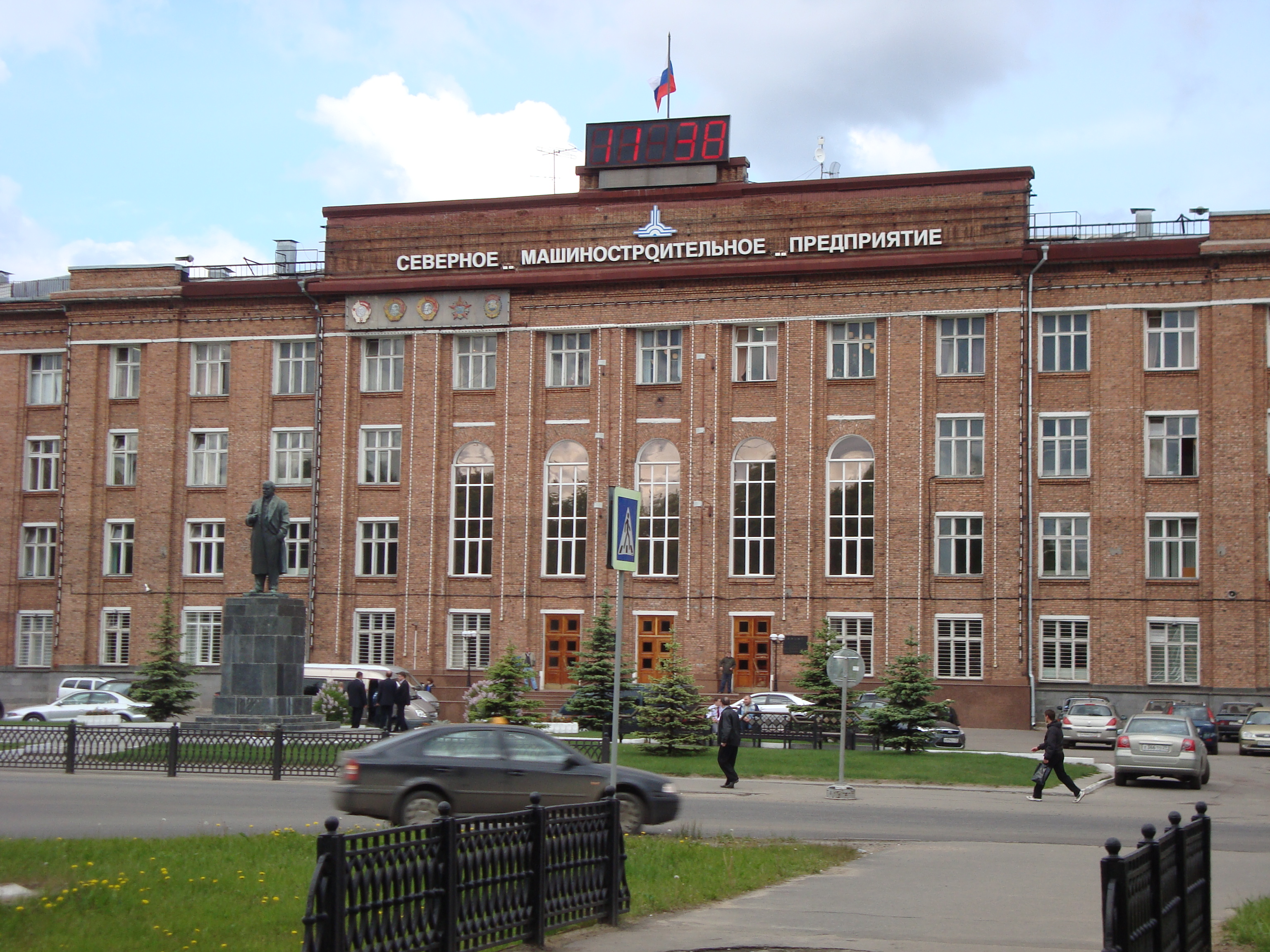
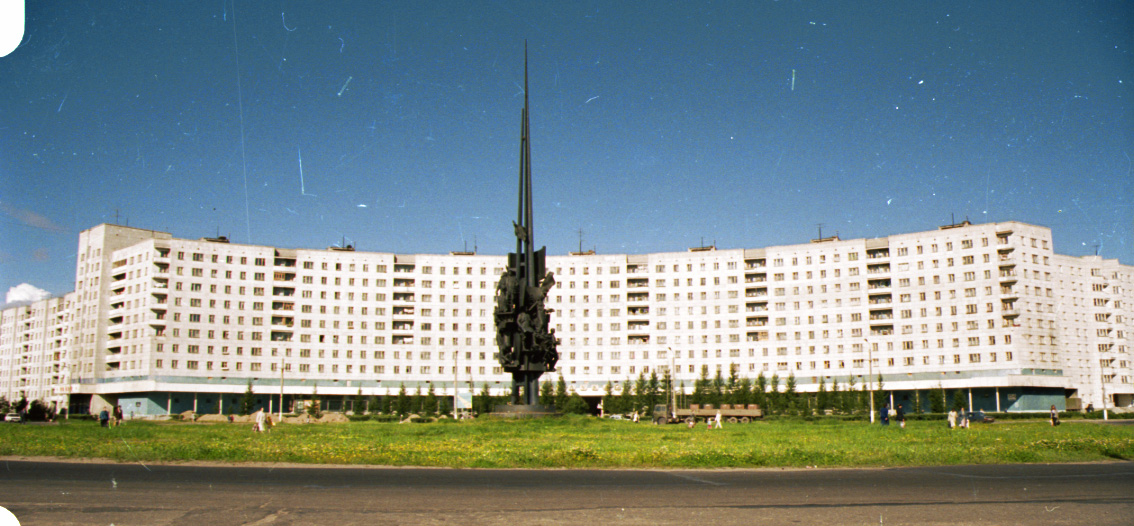
- Top-down, left-to-right: City administration, Kudemskaya narrow-gauge railway, White Sea coast on Yagry island, The "City of Labor Valor and Glory" monument, Sevmash factory, David Pashaev square

- Flag Coat of arms
- Anthem: Anthem of Severodvinsk
- Interactive map of Severodvinsk
- Location of Severodvinsk Severodvinsk (European Russia) Severodvinsk (Europe)
- Coordinates: 64°34′N 39°52′E
- Country: Russia
- Federal subject: Arkhangelsk Oblast
- Founded: 1936

Government
  - Body: City Council of Deputies
  - Mayor: Igor Skubenko (since 2017)
- Elevation: 7 m (23 ft)

Population (2010 Census)
  - Total: 192,353
  - Estimate (2025): 155,365 (−19.2%)
  - Rank: 95th in 2010

Administrative status
  - Subordinated to: city of oblast significance of Severodvinsk
  - Capital of: city of oblast significance of Severodvinsk

Municipal status
  - Urban okrug: Severodvinsk Urban Okrug
  - Capital of: Severodvinsk Urban Okrug
- Time zone: UTC+3 (MSK)
- Postal codes: 164500–164502, 164504, 164505, 164507, 164509, 164510, 164512, 164514, 164515, 164518, 164520–164524, 164529
- Dialing code: +7 81842
- OKTMO ID: 11730000001
- City Day: Last Sunday of July
- Website: www.severodvinsk.info

Severodvinsk (Russian: Северодви́нск; IPA: [sʲɪvʲɪrɐdˈvʲinsk]) is the second-largest city in Arkhangelsk Oblast, Russia. It is located in the oblasts north, in the delta of the Northern Dvina, 35 kilometers (22 mi) west of Arkhangelsk, the administrative center and most populous city of the oblast. As of the 2021 Census, the population was 157,213. Due to the presence of important military shipyards (specialising in submarines since the Soviet period), Severodvinsk is an access-restricted town for foreign citizens. A special permit is required.

It was previously known as Sudostroy (until 1938), and Molotovsk (until 1957).

== History ==
=== Pre-20th century ===
Vikings explored the territories around the North Dvina River - part of Bjarmaland - at the start of the second millennium. British and Norman ships came to these places for mining, fur and fishing before the 13th century, but later the climate became colder and access to the northern seas became closed.

The historical records first mention the settlement on the site of modern Severodvinsk in 1419, when the Swedes sailed into the bay and burnt down the Nikolo-Korelsky Monastery that stood by the shore during the Swedish–Novgorodian Wars. Tradition has it that Saint Euphemius, an Orthodox missionary in Karelia, founded this monastery. The abbey stood in ruins until 1471, when two sons of Marfa Boretskaya died in a vicious storm; their bodies were recovered on the beach near the monastery twelve days later. At the urging of Boretskaya, the monastery was restored and her sons were buried there.

On August 24, 1553, a ship of Richard Chancellor reached the salt-mining settlement of Nyonoksa, which is still famous for its traditional wooden architecture. The British sailors visited the Nikolo-Korelsky Monastery, where they were surprised to find a community of "sailors in soutanes (cassocks)" and a pier large enough to accommodate several ships. The main church of this extraordinary establishment was dedicated to Saint Nicholas, the holy patron of sailors; hence, the whole White Sea became known in 16th-century English maps as "St. Nicholas Bay". In late 1613, during the Time of Troubles in Russia, Polish-Lithuanian vagabonds, the Lisowczycy, captured and looted Severodvinsk with the monastery.

The Nikolo-Korelsky Monastery flourished after the establishment of the Muscovy Company, as the bulk of their trade passed through the local harbor. In August 1618 the harbour was visited by John Tradescant the elder, who conducted a survey of an island situated opposite the monastery. This island became known to the British as "Rose Island", because it was there that Tradescant found an exceedingly rare plant which he named "Rosa moscovita" (which is now known as Rosa acicularis) and brought back to London.

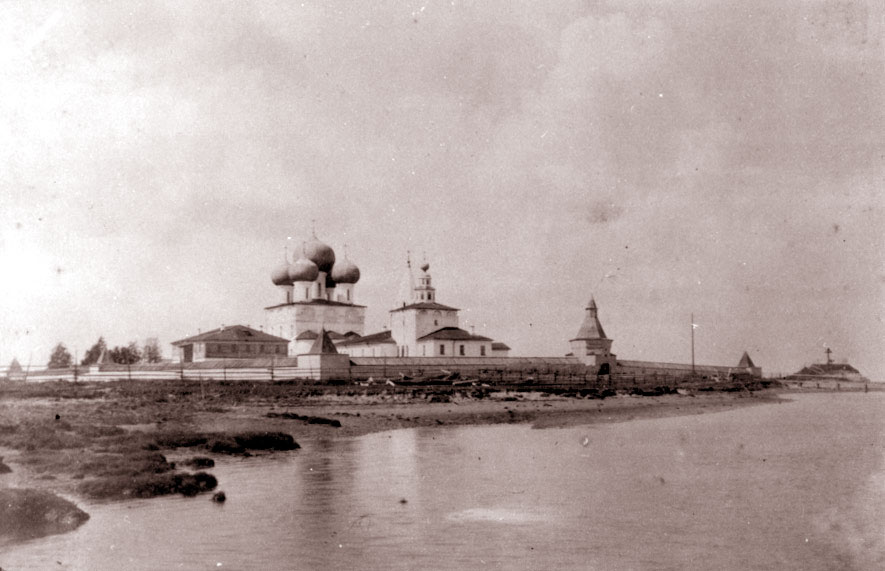
View of the Nikolo-Korelsky Monastery in the early 20th century

The surviving buildings of the monastery were constructed at the close of the Muscovite period. The five-domed cathedral of St. Nicholas was built between 1670 and 1674, preceded by the Assumption church (1664–1667), to which it is joined by a gallery. Several decades later, the walls and towers were built of timber; the Soviets transported the best-preserved of these towers to Kolomenskoye, Moscow, where it still remains.

=== Modern city ===
Severodvinsk is the second-largest city in the Arkhangelsk Oblast. Its main industry remains defense-related — the construction and repair of submarines at the huge Northern Machine-building Enterprise SEVMASH (Russian: Северное Машиностроительное Предприятие-СЕВМАШ), which built the Soviet Union's first nuclear submarine Leninsky Komsomol here in 1957. From 1976 to 1981 Dmitry Donskoy, the world's largest submarine, a Typhoon class boat, was also built here, as later recorded in the Guinness Book of World Records.

In the Soviet period the modern city of Severodvinsk developed from 1936 onwards. Initially dubbed Sudostroy (Судострой - "Boat-build"), it received town status in 1938; from 1938 until 1957 it was named Molotovsk (Молотовск), after Vyacheslav Molotov (1890-1986). On September 12, 1957, it was renamed Severodvinsk (meaning "Northern Dvina town").

Construction Site 203 aimed to complete the warship-building project and build the city and was driven by the Yagrinlag camp complex (1938-1953) and its thousands of prisoners.

During the Soviet Union's participation in World War II between 1941 and 1945 a significant portion of the materials delivered by the Arctic Convoys to Murmansk and Arkhangelsk were unloaded in Molotovsk (Severodvinsk). For example, the Empire Elgar, a British heavy-lift ship arrived in Arkhangelsk with convoy PQ 16 in May 1942 and subsequently spent eight weeks unloading ships from the ill-fated convoy PQ 17.

A Russian naval-base supports the sea trials of nuclear submarines from the major submarine construction- (64.5817 N, 39.8307 E) and repair-facilities located in the area. In Soviet times, the 17th-century buildings of the Nikolo-Korelsky monastery, located on the territory of the shipyard, were adapted and used for shipbuilding purposes. In recent years, the monastery buildings, specifically the main church, have been restored and re-consecrated. Church-goers attending services have to be shipyard workers or able to obtain a pass to enter the church portion of the shipyard.

Severodvinsk is an access-restricted town for foreign citizens. A special pass is required.

On 8 August 2019, a nuclear accident took place on the Russian Navy's Central Missile Range in Nyonoksa, 30 km to the west from Severodvinsk.

== Administrative and municipal status ==
Within the framework of administrative divisions, it is, together with eleven rural localities, incorporated as the city of oblast significance of Severodvinsk—an administrative unit with the status equal to that of the districts. As a municipal division, the city of oblast significance of Severodvinsk is incorporated as Severodvinsk Urban Okrug.

== Demographics ==
Population: 192,353 (2010 census); 201,551 (2002 census); 248,670 (1989 Soviet census).

Historical population
Year	Pop.	±%
1939	21,000	—
1959	78,657	+274.6%
1970	144,672	+83.9%
1979	197,232	+36.3%
1989	248,670	+26.1%
2002	201,551	−18.9%
2010	192,353	−4.6%
2021	157,213	−18.3%
Source: Census data

Population of Severodvinsk from 1939 to the present
1939	1944	1959	1962	1967	1970	1973
21,000	28,900 ▲	78,657 ▲	97,000 ▲	121,000 ▲	144,672 ▲	160,000 ▲
1975	1976	1979	1982	1985	1986	1987
177,000 ▲	177,000	197,232 ▲	214,000 ▲	238,000 ▲	233,000 ▼	239,000 ▲
1989	1990	1991	1992	1993	1994	1995
248,670 ▲	255,000 ▲	252,000 ▼	250,000 ▼	245,000 ▼	243,000 ▼	246,000 ▲
1996	1997	1998	1999	2000	2001	2002
244,000 ▼	237,000 ▼	239,000 ▲	231,800 ▼	229,300 ▼	232,800 ▲	201,551 ▼
2003	2004	2005	2006	2007	2008	2009
201,600 ▲	199,300 ▼	197,400 ▼	195,200 ▼	193,200 ▼	191,400 ▼	188,855 ▼
2010	2011	2012	2013	2014	2015	2016
192,353 ▲	191,794 ▼	190,083 ▼	188,539 ▼	187,284 ▼	186,172 ▼	185,075 ▼
2017	2018	2019	2020	2021	2022	2023
183,996 ▼	183,255 ▼	182,291 ▼	181,990 ▼	180,806 ▼		

Ethnic groups population according to the All-Russian population census of 2010
Ethnic group	Population	Percentage of those who indicated their ethnicity, %
Russians	176,397	95.50
Ukrainians	3,135	1.70
Belarusians	1,149	0.62
Tatars	406	0.22
Azerbaijanis	255	0.14
Chuvash	237	0.13
Indians	181	0.10
Armenians	140	0.08
Mordvins	134	0.07
Komi	109	0.06
Moldovans	108	0.06
Jews	107	0.06
Udmurt	104	0.05
Mari	91	0.05
Germans	62	0.03
Bashkirs	58	0.03
Lezgins	54	0.03
Lithuanians	52	0.03
Others	1,930	1.04
Total of those who indicated their ethnicity	184,709	100,00
Citizens who did not specify their ethnicity	8898	

From 1950 until 1990, high-tech industries generated demand for a considerable quantity of suitably qualified experts and workers which prompted growth in population. Since 1992, the population has declined due to economic crises and unemployment that has provoked significant migration from the city.

== Geography ==
=== Location ===
The city is located near the Nikolsky mouth of the Northern Dvina at its confluence with the White Sea, 35 km northwest of Arkhangelsk, administrative centre of the region.

The area of Severodvinsk Urban Okrug, which includes the city of Severodvinsk and nearby rural settlements, is 1,193.49 square kilometres (460.81 mi^{2}), which is more than the area of Moscow within the MKAD. It is due to the fact that in addition to the city of Severodvinsk a large forest area with its settlements (villages and dachas) to the south and west of the city is included in the boundaries of Severodvinsk Urban Okrug itself. The area of the city within the city limits is 120.5 square kilometres (46.5 mi^{2}).

The city is located at a latitude of 64°34′N, which means that it is possible to observe the northern lights.

=== Climate ===
Climate in Severodvinsk is subarctic according to the Köppen climate classification. Summers are cool and winters are very cold. The average winter temperature is lower than in the central, southern and even some northern (such as Saint-Petersburg) regions of the European part of Russia. In December the Sun rises after 9 am and sets before 4 pm. But from May 17 to July 27 white nights are observed in the city.

Climate data for Severodvinsk (2010-2019)
Month	Jan	Feb	Mar	Apr	May	Jun	Jul	Aug	Sep	Oct	Nov	Dec	Year
Record high °C (°F)	3.5 (38.3)	5.0 (41.0)	10.4 (50.7)	19.6 (67.3)	31.2 (88.2)	30.9 (87.6)	35.9 (96.6)	29.9 (85.8)	26.9 (80.4)	15.8 (60.4)	9.8 (49.6)	3.7 (38.7)	35.9 (96.6)
Daily mean °C (°F)	−9.4 (15.1)	−7.3 (18.9)	−4.1 (24.6)	1.4 (34.5)	8 (46)	11.8 (53.2)	15 (59)	13.3 (55.9)	9.1 (48.4)	3 (37)	−1.5 (29.3)	−4.5 (23.9)	3 (37)
Record low °C (°F)	−36.3 (−33.3)	−34 (−29)	−29.6 (−21.3)	−16.6 (2.1)	−3.9 (25.0)	1.3 (34.3)	3.7 (38.7)	3.7 (38.7)	−1.4 (29.5)	−12.1 (10.2)	−20.6 (−5.1)	−28.8 (−19.8)	−36.6 (−33.9)
Average precipitation mm (inches)	32 (1.3)	26 (1.0)	22 (0.9)	29 (1.1)	28 (1.1)	70 (2.8)	71 (2.8)	93 (3.7)	57 (2.2)	57 (2.2)	41 (1.6)	41 (1.6)	566 (22.3)
Average relative humidity (%)	85	83	78	73	65	70	73	77	82	86	87	87	79
Source: http://www.pogodaiklimat.ru/summary/22546.htm

== Economy ==
=== Industry ===
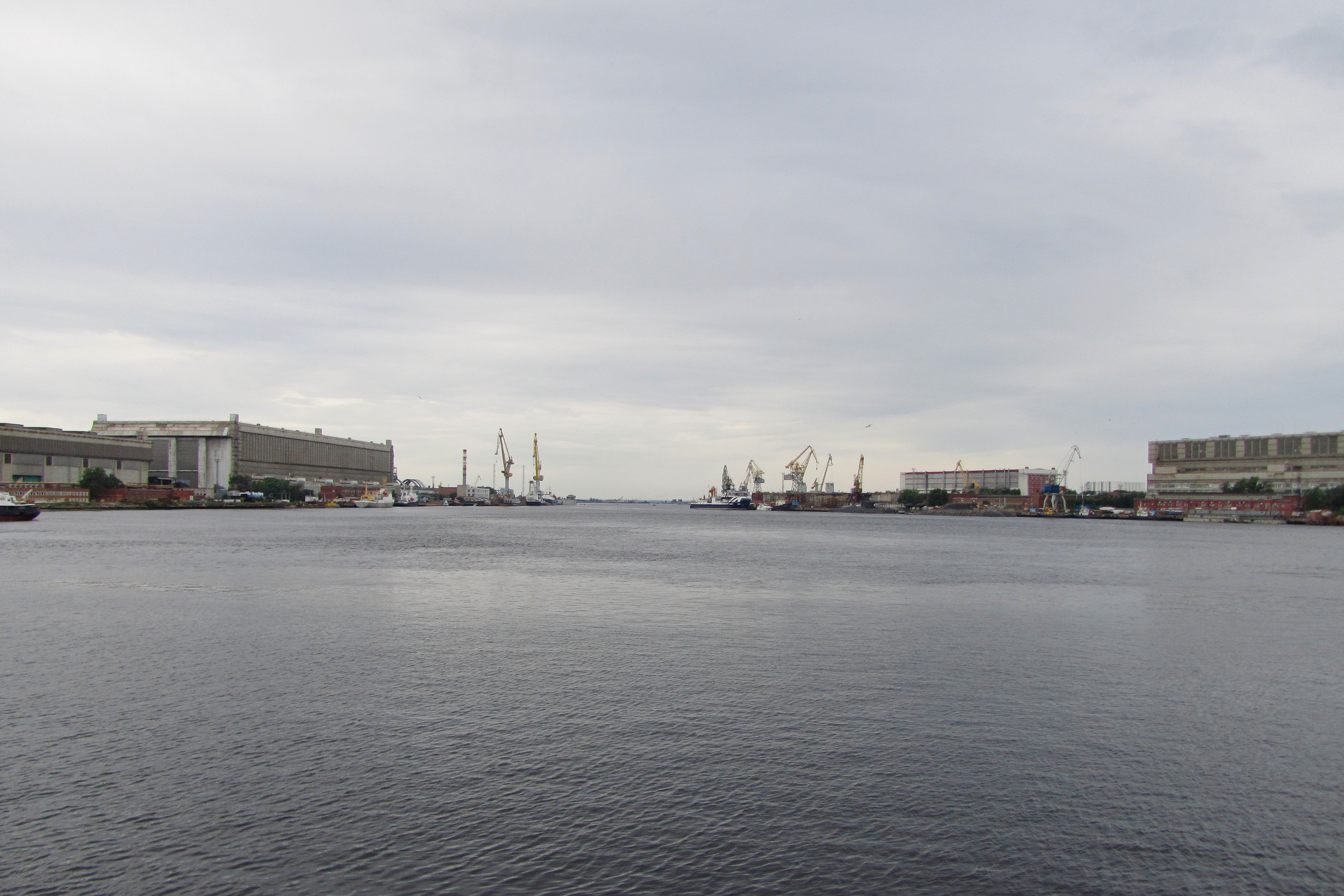
Nikolskoe mouth, the "Zvyozdochka" factory is on the right bank, the "Sevmash" factory is on the left bank

The main role of the city has been, and remains, the production and repair of submarines and military ships. During the Cold War, the city prospered, but with the decline and break-up of the Soviet Union and the end of the Cold War the city has declined. The city's large military enterprises have survived the economic crises of the 1990s and have adjusted to new economic conditions. Severodvinsk now has the largest shipbuilding yard in Russia for large ships (tankers, cargo ships).

==== Large and military factories ====
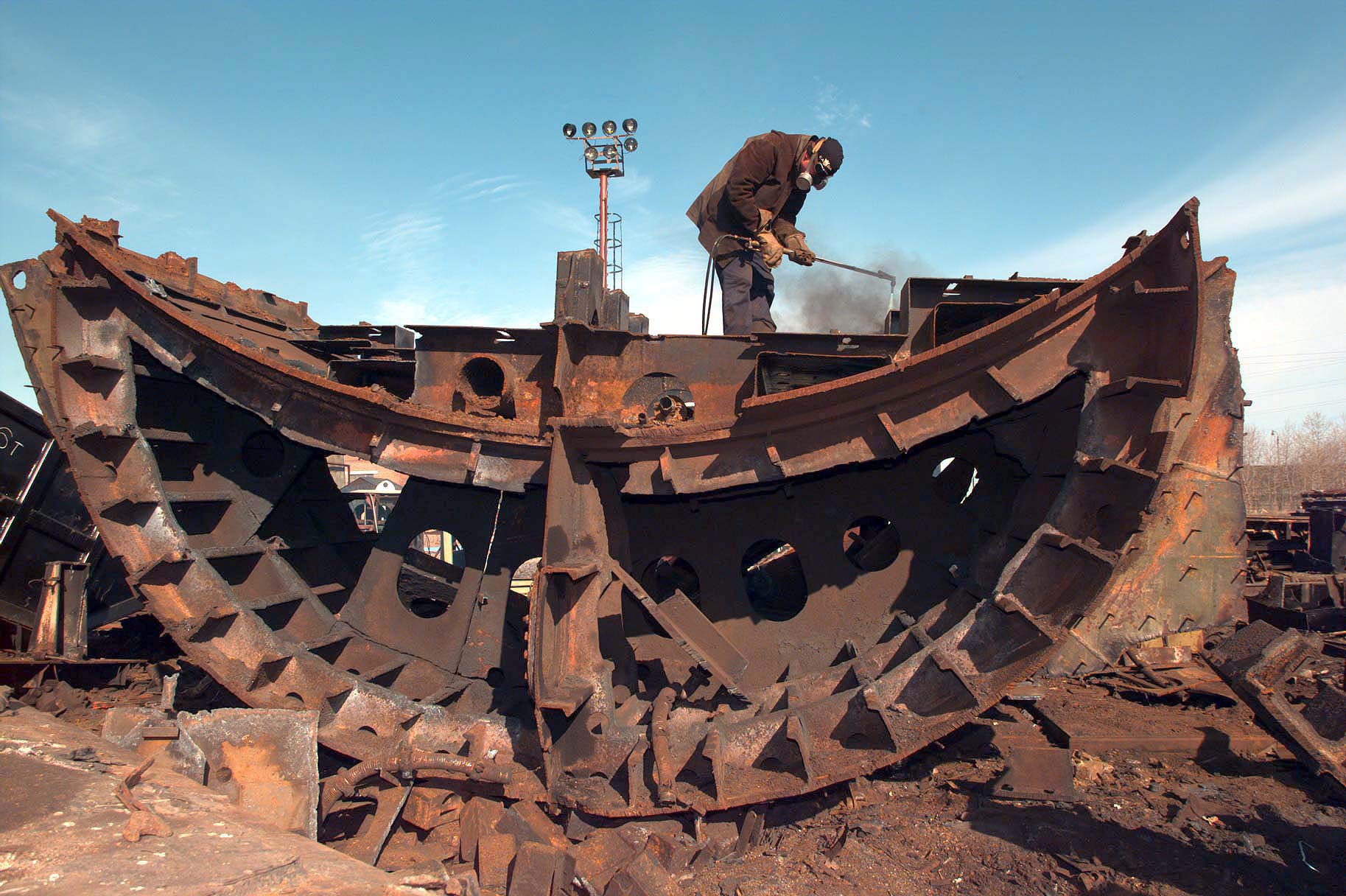
- Disassembly of a Soviet submarine in Severodvinsk, as part of the Nunn-Lugar Cooperative Threat Reduction Program
  "SevMash"(СевМаш) or Northern Machine-building Enterprise (Северное машиностроительное предприятие)

core line of business is the construction and repair of submarines and other naval ships, as well as civilian vessels and oil platforms

- "Zvezdochka" (Звёздочка ("Starlet"))

Repair of submarines, military and civil ships, construction of oil platforms and faceting of diamonds.

- "Severny Reyd" (Северный рейд("Northern Raid"))

Manufacture of marine equipment.

- "Arktika" (Арктика ("Arctic"))

Manufacture of automated equipment.

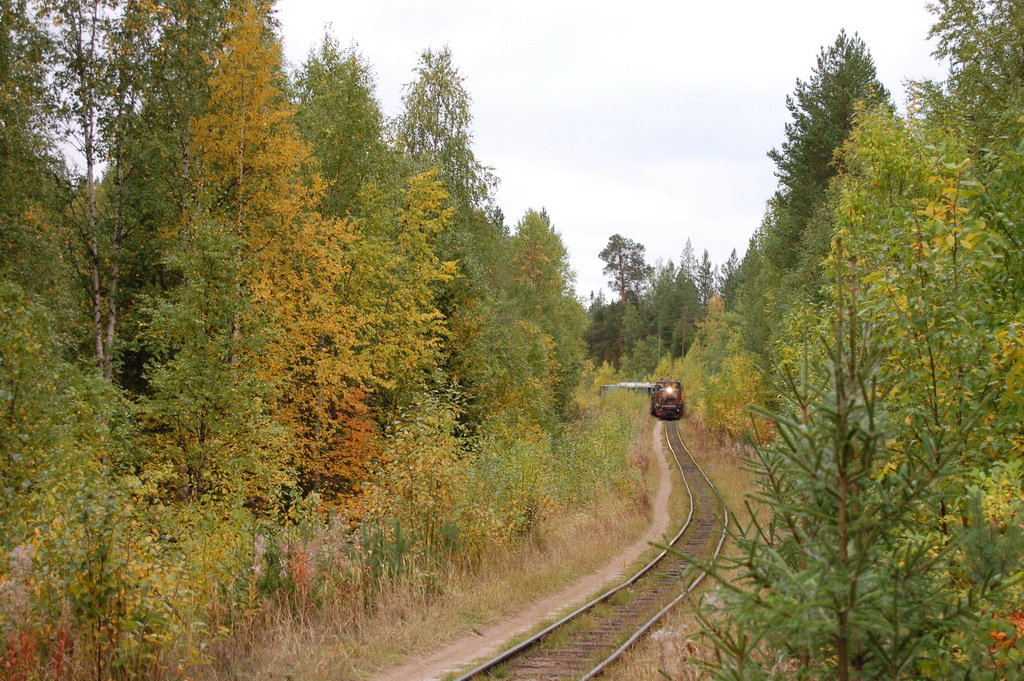
Kudemskaya narrow-gauge railway (2011)

=== Transportation ===
Severodvinsk is the terminal station of a railway line which splits off at Isakogorka station from the line connecting Moscow and Arkhangelsk.

The Kudemskaya narrow-gauge railway in 2010 has appeared in Forbes ranking, of 10 most beautiful railway routes of the world.

== Sport ==
Sport teams representing Severodvinsk in city, regional and all-Russian competitions:

- "Sevmash" (also represents Northern Machine-building Enterprise) - football, futsal, ice hockey, bandy, volleyball, floorball;
- "Zvezdochka" (also represents "Zvezdochka" enterprise) - football, futsal, hockey, volleyball;
- "Sever" - bandy.
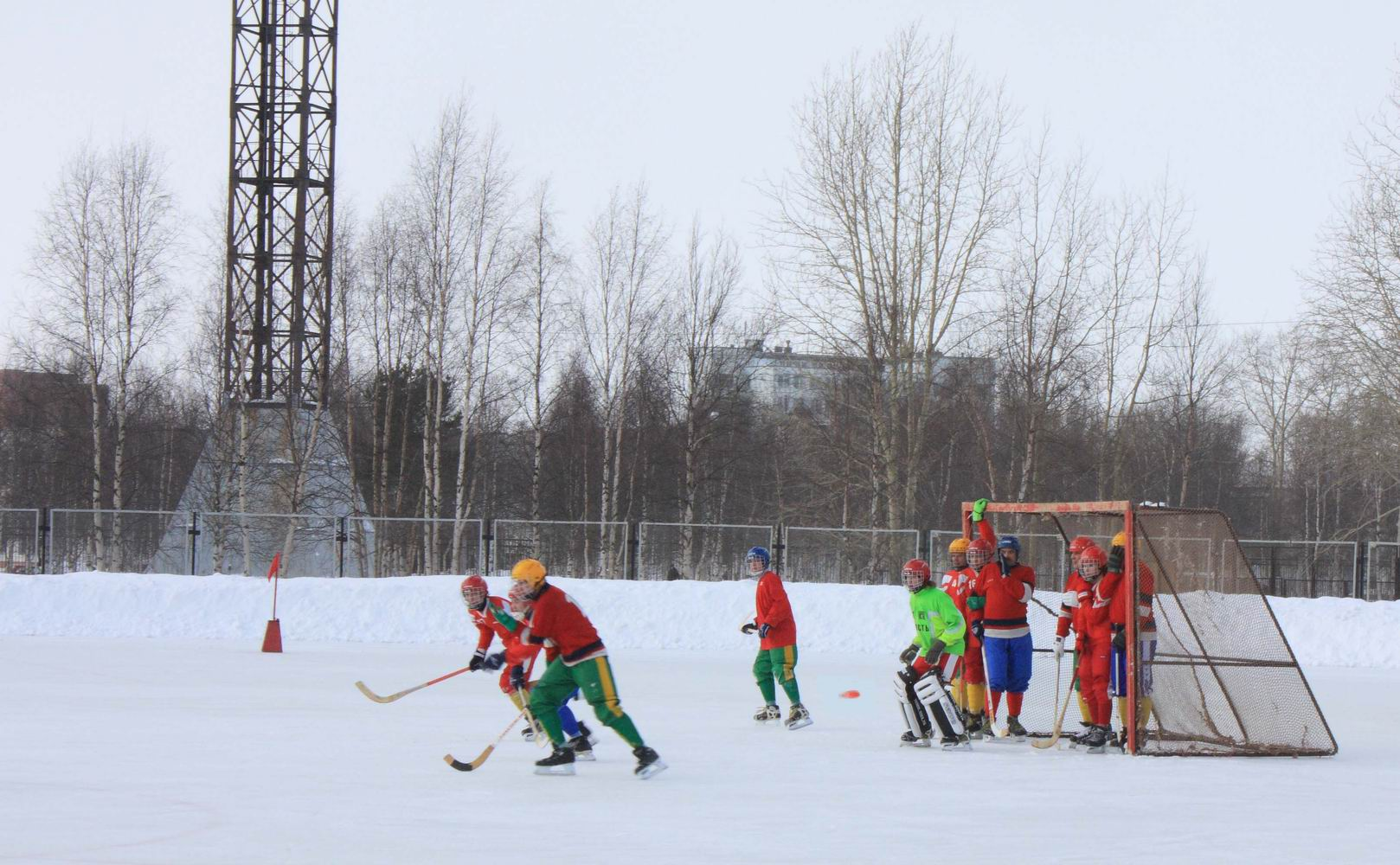
Sevmash playing bandy

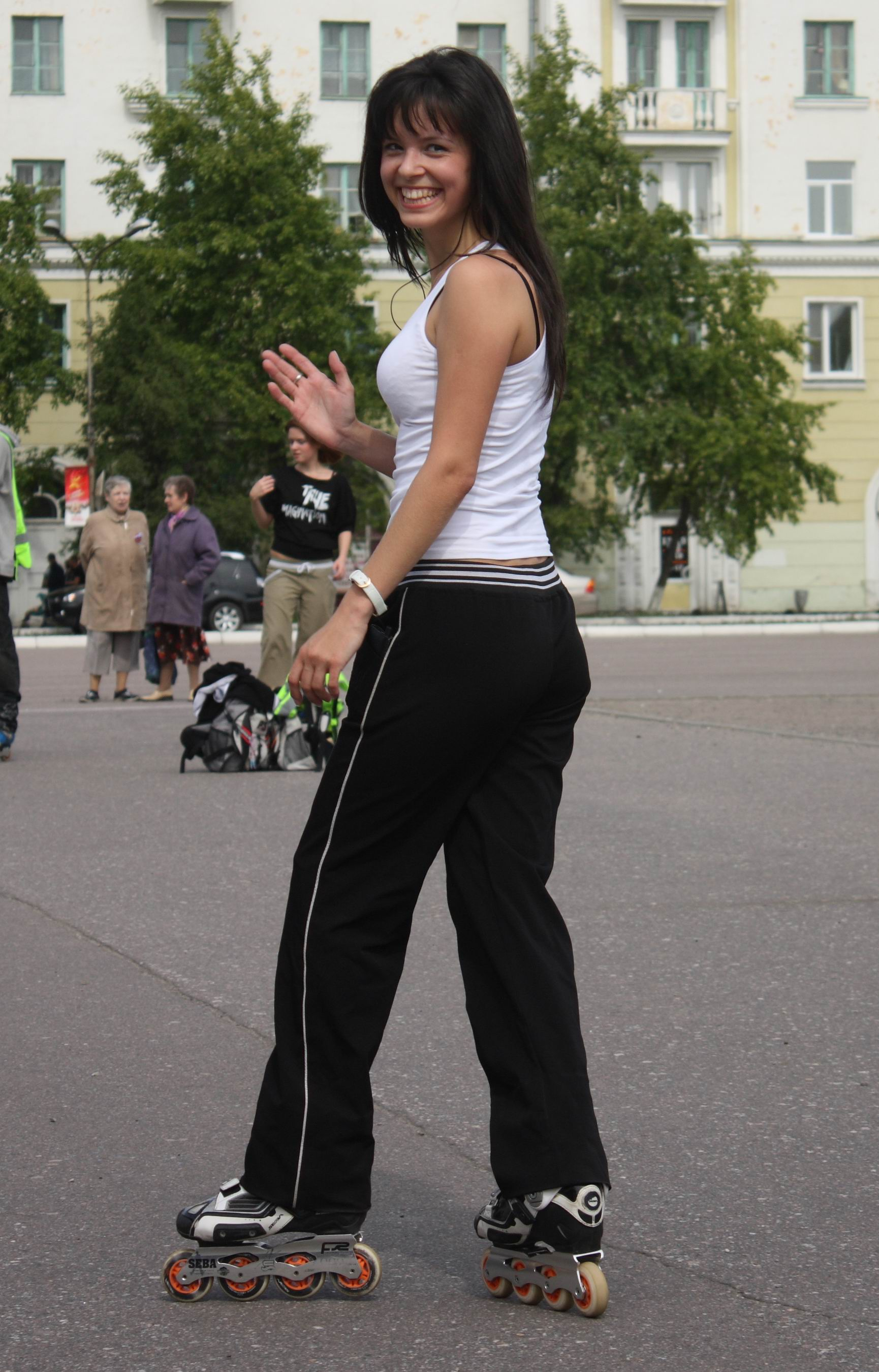
Inline skating in Severodvinsk

== Social sphere ==
=== Education ===
There are 32 middle schools of general education in Severodvinsk, including special schools for orphans and handicapped children; two musical schools and two art schools.

=== Secondary vocational education institutions ===
- Technical College (part of the Northern (Arctic) Federal University since 2011)
- Technical School of Construction, Design and Technology
- Technical School of Shipbuilding and Engineering
- Technical School of Shipbuilding and Ship Repair
- Technical School of Social Infrastructure
- Technical School of Wiring and Communication
- College of Management and Information Technology
- Branch of Arkhangelsk Medical College

=== Higher education institutions ===
The city hosts branches of the following institutions:

- Northern (Arctic) Federal University (including Institute of Shipbuilding and Maritime Arctic Engineering (ISMART) and Institute of Humanities)
- International Institute of Management (Arkhangelsk)
- Moscow Modern Humanitarian Academy
- Northwest Academy of the State Service (St. Petersburg)

=== Monuments ===
There are nearly twenty monuments and memorial complexes in the city, including:

- a monument honoring the city founders on Pashaeva Square (a 30-meter sculpture);
- a monument to the renowned Russian scientist Mikhail Lomonosov, who was born in the region. One of the city's central streets is named after him;
- two monuments to Vladimir Lenin;
- the city gate, on the road from Arkhangelsk;
  The Pikul's house^{[ru]}
- a monument to the home front workers of World War II;
- military memorial complex on Yagry island which includes monument to World War II participants "The Grieving Motherland", monuments to the victims of the Kursk submarine disaster and the liquidators of the Chernobyl disaster.

=== Cultural heritage ===
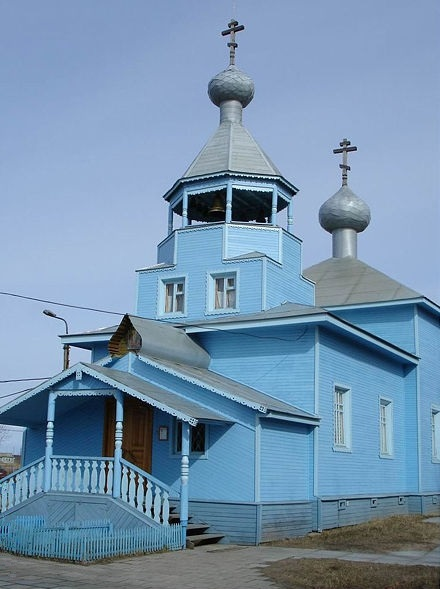
Resurrection of Christ Church on Yagry Island

Fifteen objects in Severodvinsk are protected as cultural heritage monuments In particular, the Nyonokotsky Pogost in the village of Nyonoksa is protected as an architecture monument on the federal level. This is one of the few surviving triple wooden church ensembles, consisting of two churches (a bigger, not heated, church used in the summer, a smaller, heated church used in the winter) and a bell-tower. Nyonoksa was also notable for salt production.

In addition, the wooden Church Resurrection of Christ, currently located on Yagry Island in the northern part of Severodvinsk, was relocated there in 1990s and was the first religious building open in the city. The church was built in the end of 19th century in the village of Solza about 20 kilometers (12 mi) from Severodvinsk.

The stone church of St. Nicholas is located in the eastern portion of the SEVMASH Shipyard. The church building is the last remnant of the Svyato-Nikolskoye Monastery which served as the gateway to the pilgrimage monastery on the Solovetskiy Islands from the 15th century.

== City in culture ==
- K-19: The Widowmaker
- Nuclear underwater epic, film of Discovery Channel
- Seven Days, Season 1, Episode 13, "Last Breath"

== Notable people ==
- Polina Agafonova, Russian figure skater, was born in Severodvinsk in 1996.
- Svetlana Klyukina, Russian artistic gymnast and a member of Russian Olympic team on 2008 Summer Olympics, was born in Severodvinsk in 1989.
- Maria Kursova, professional chess player representing Armenia
- Marina Prusakova, widow of Lee Harvey Oswald, the assassin of US President John F. Kennedy in 1963, was born in Molotovsk in 1941.
- Olga Rukavishnikova, Soviet athlete who mainly competed in the women's pentathlon event during her career, was born in Molotovsk in 1955.
- Mikhail Suprun, Russian historian and professor of the Pomor State University named after M. V. Lomonosov, was born in Molotovsk in 1955.

== Twin towns and sister cities ==
Severodvinsk is twinned with:

- Portsmouth, New Hampshire, United States
- Bryansk, Bryansk Oblast, Russia
- Mazyr, Belarus
- Sumy, Ukraine
- Tiraspol, Moldova
