= Kudemskaya narrow-gauge railway =

Narrow gauge railway line in Russia

Coordinates: 64.26769°N 39.84544°E

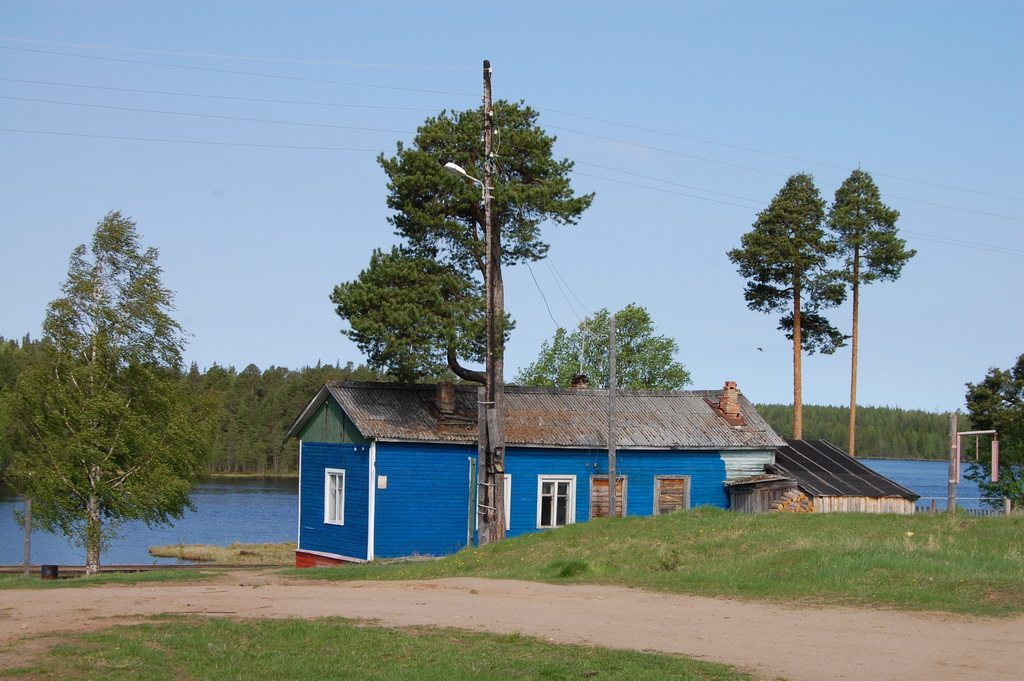

Overview
- Locale: Arkhangelsk Oblast, Russia
- Termini: Severodvinsk; Beloye Ozero

Service
- Type: Narrow gauge railway
- Operator: СМУП «БЕЛОЕ ОЗЕРО»

History
- Opened: 1949

Technical
- Line length: 41 kilometres (25 mi)
- Track gauge: 750 mm (2 ft 5 1/2 in)
Route map
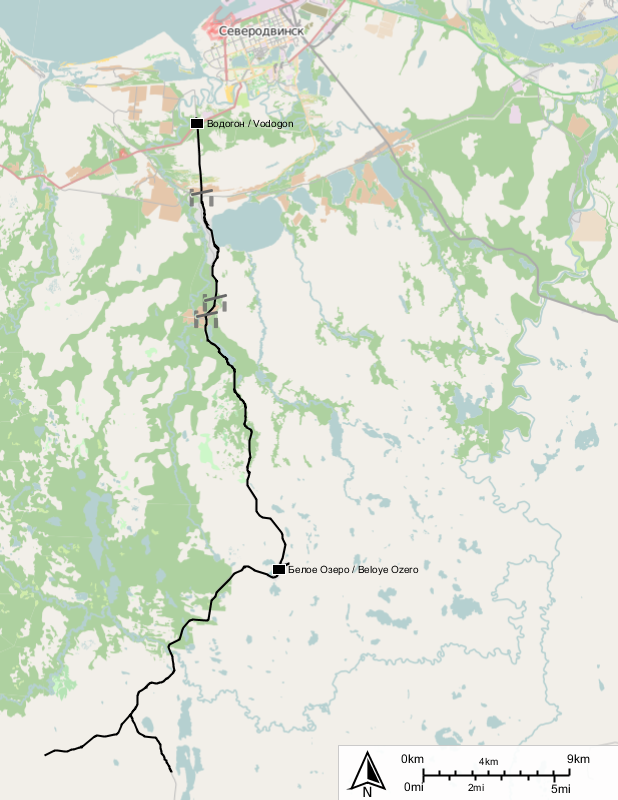

The Kudemskaya narrow-gauge railway is located in Arkhangelsk Oblast, Russia. The narrow-gauge railway, a former forest railway, was opened in 1949 and has a total length of 108 kilometres (67 mi), of which 41 kilometres (25 mi) is currently operational. The track gauge is 750 mm (2 ft 5 1/2 in). The head office of the railway is located in the Arkhangelsk Oblast, Severodvinsk.

== Status ==
The total length of the Kudemskoy narrow-gauge railway at the peak of its development exceeded 100 kilometres (62 mi). The main station is located in the village of Beloye Ozero; the Vodogon station is located on the western outskirts of the city of Severodvinsk. Passenger trains between Vodogon and Beloye Ozero are scheduled five times a week. The railway also transports food, mail and fuel. In 2010, this railway appeared in the Forbes ranking of the 10 most beautiful railway routes in the world. In 2013, a new passenger car was purchased for the route.

== Rolling stock ==
=== Locomotives ===
- TU8 – No. 0284, 0332
- TD-5U «Pioneer» – Transportation local residents

=== Railroad car ===
- Boxcar
- Flatcar
- Tank car
- Snowplow
- Passenger car

== Gallery ==
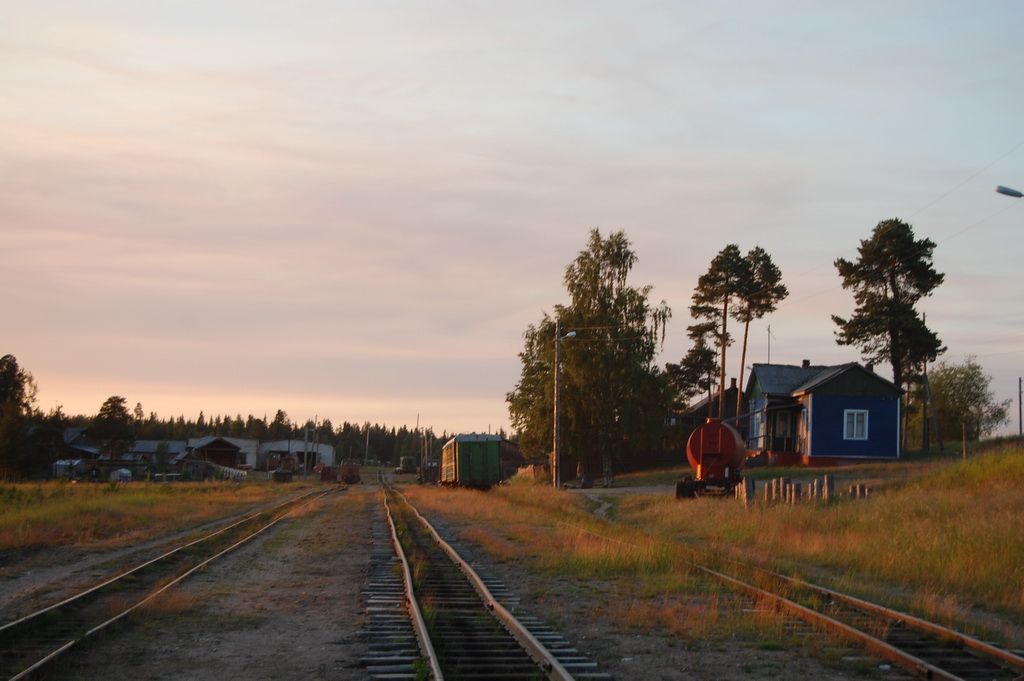
Beloye Ozero (Russian: White Lake) Station

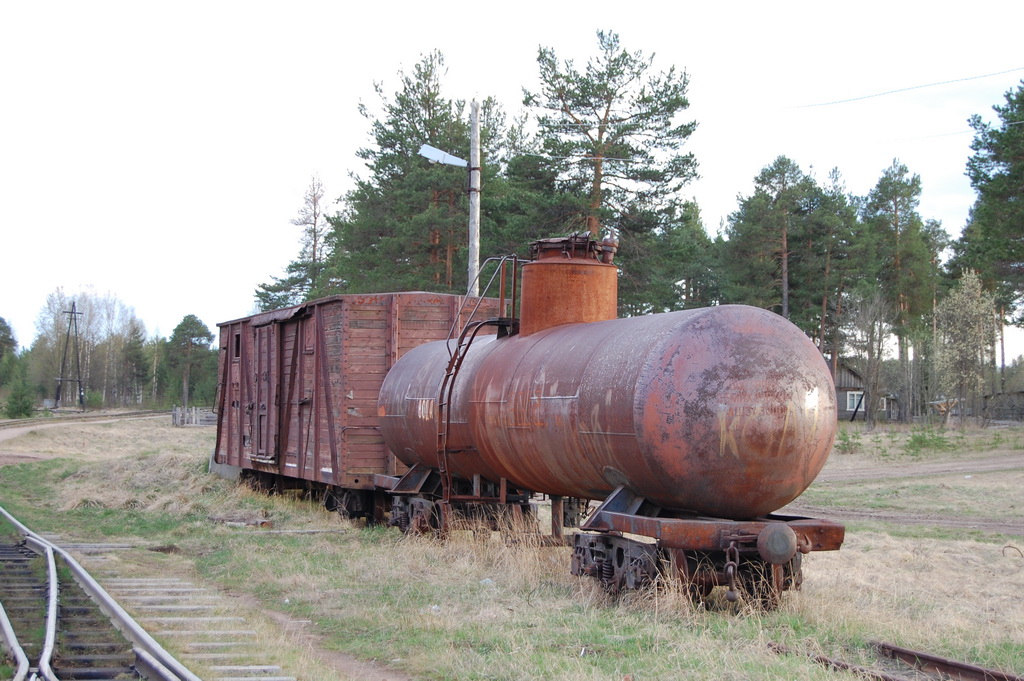
Freight cars, Beloye Ozero Station

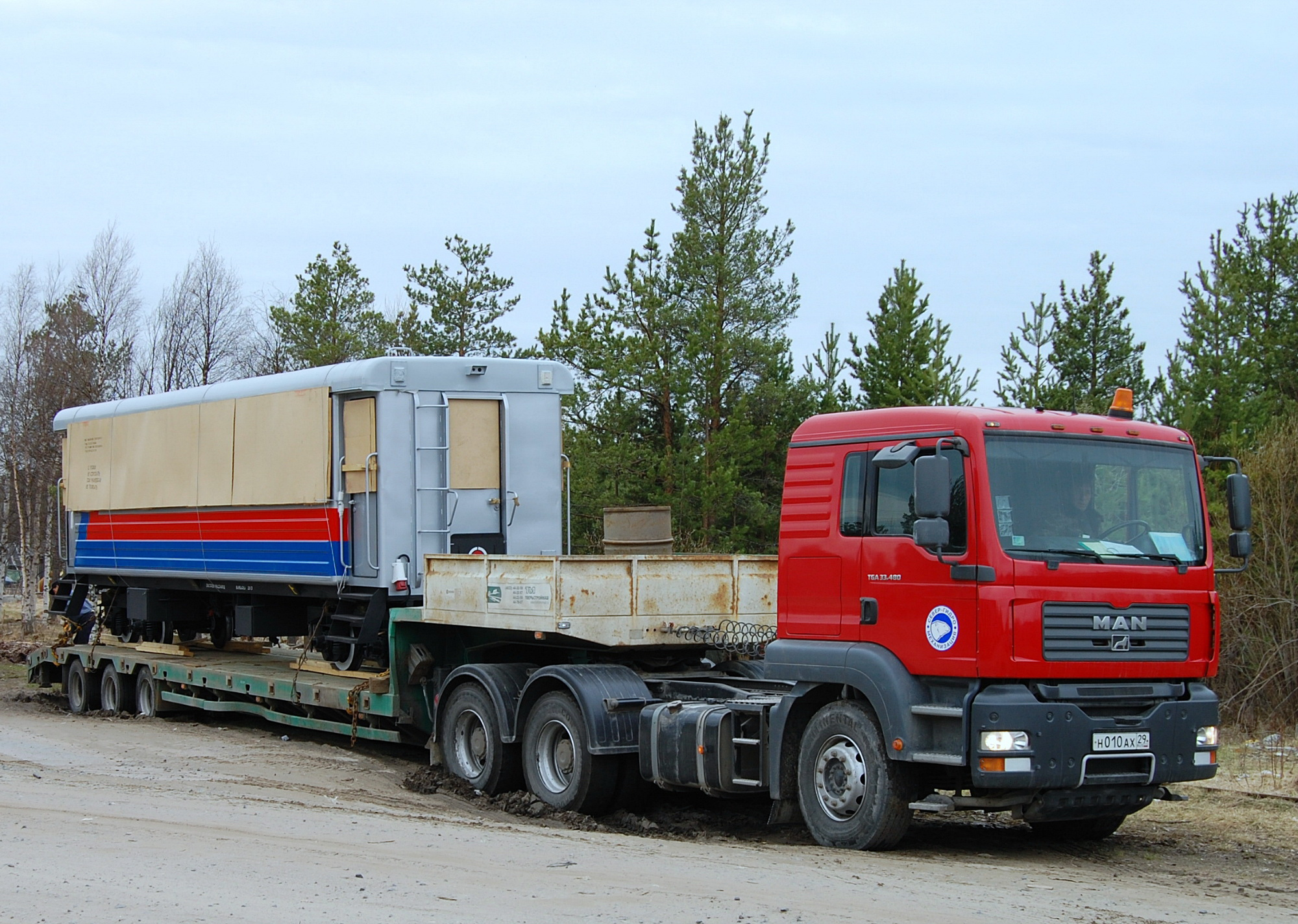
Vodogon Station, new passenger car

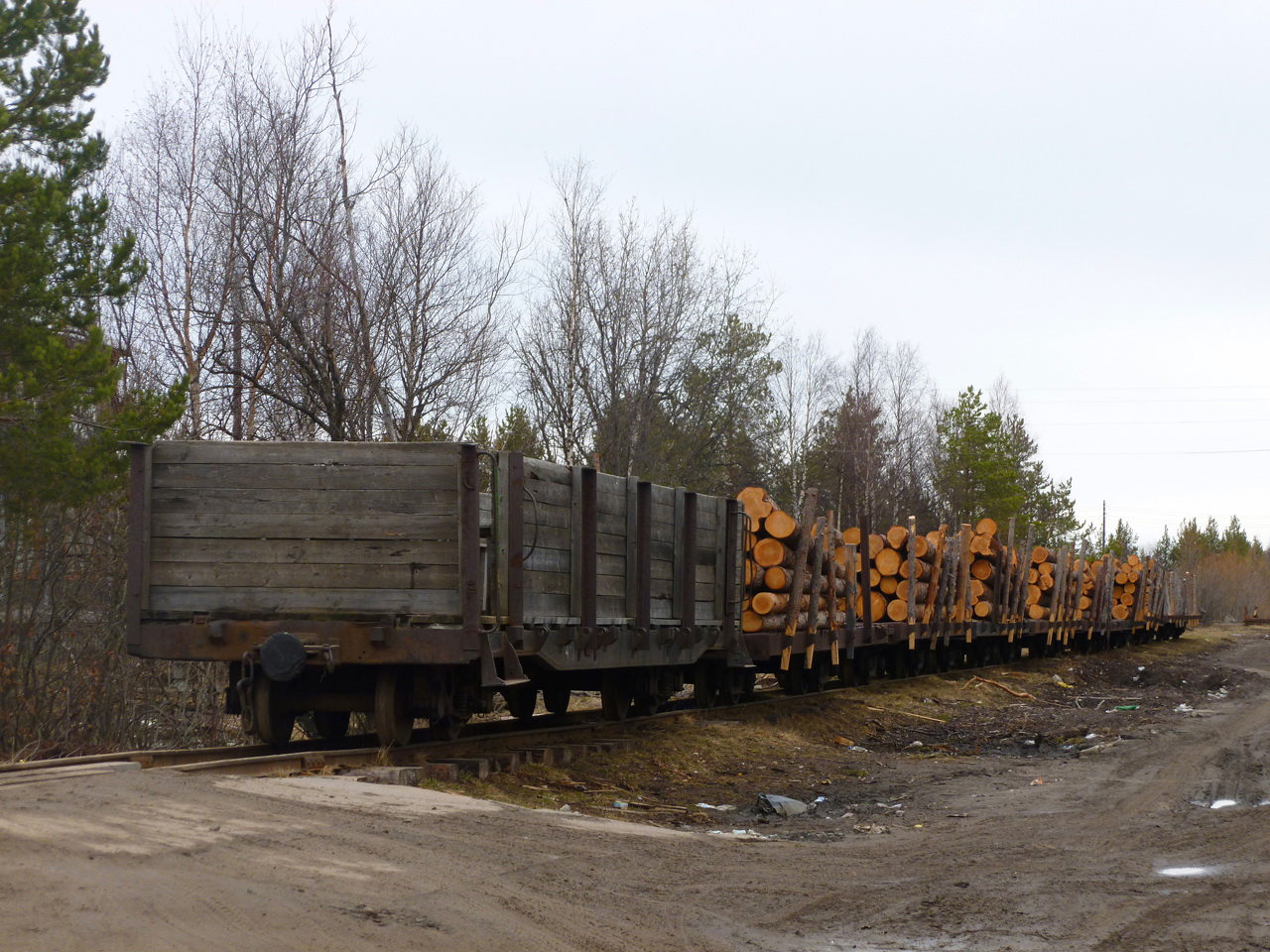
Freight cars, Vodogon Station

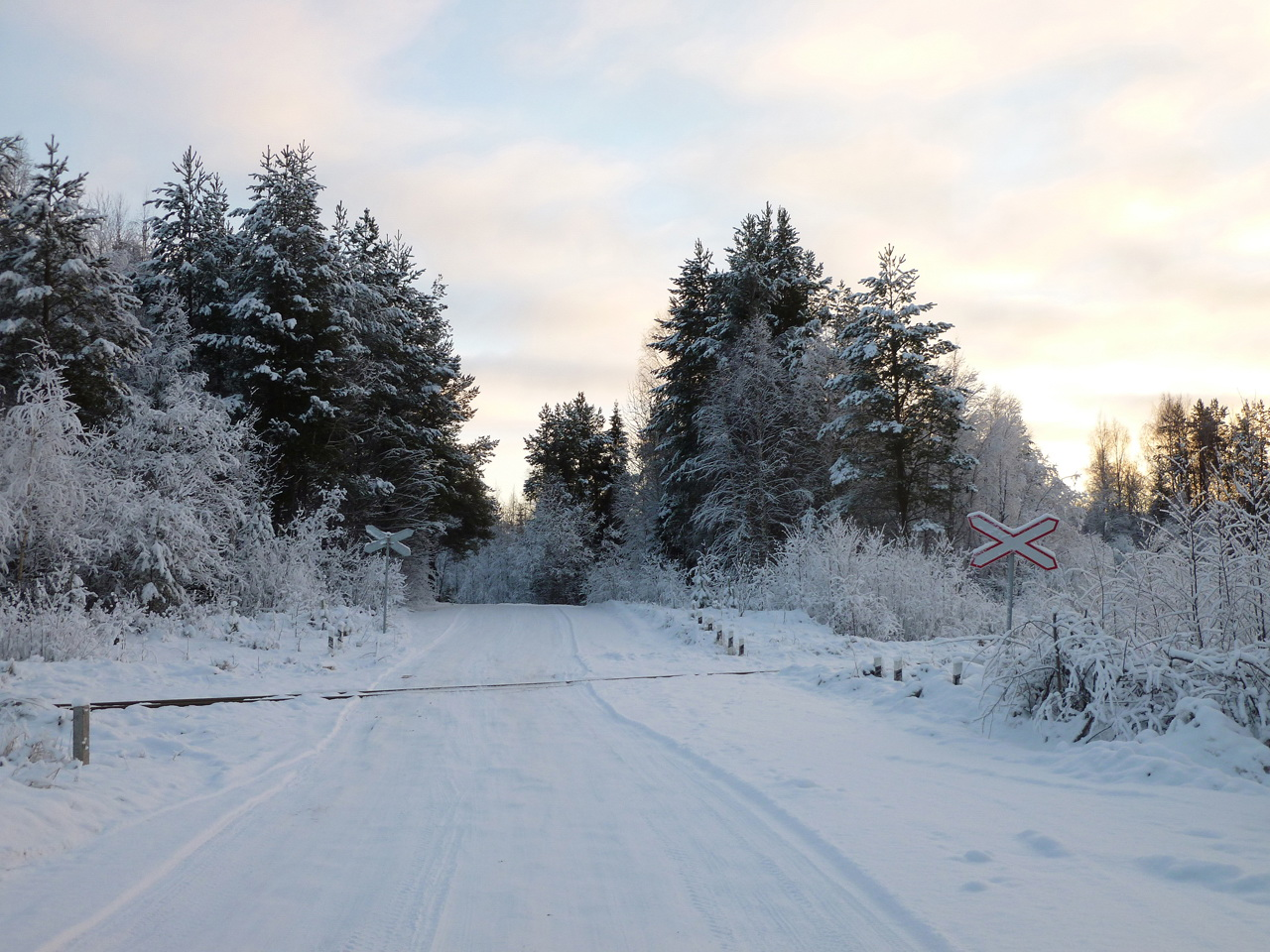
Level crossing

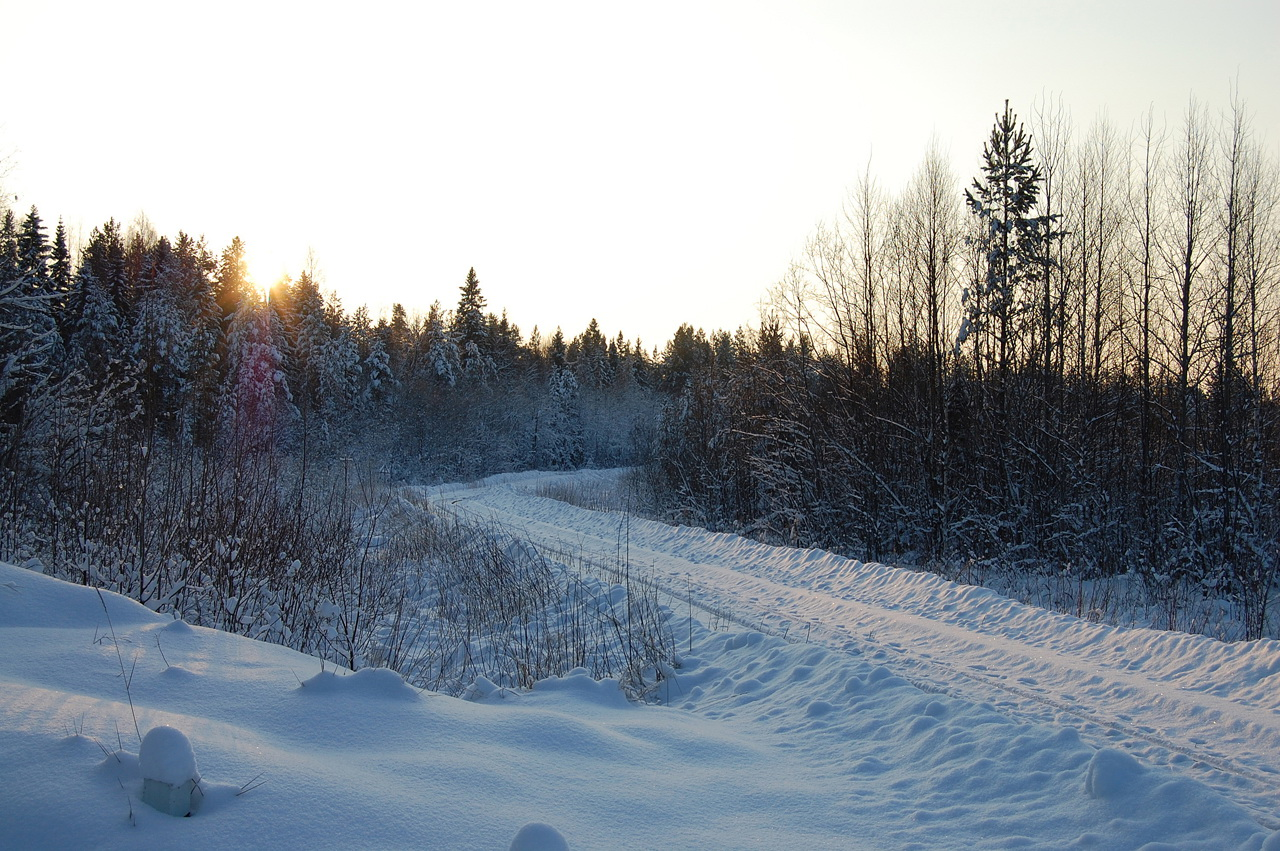
Forest railway

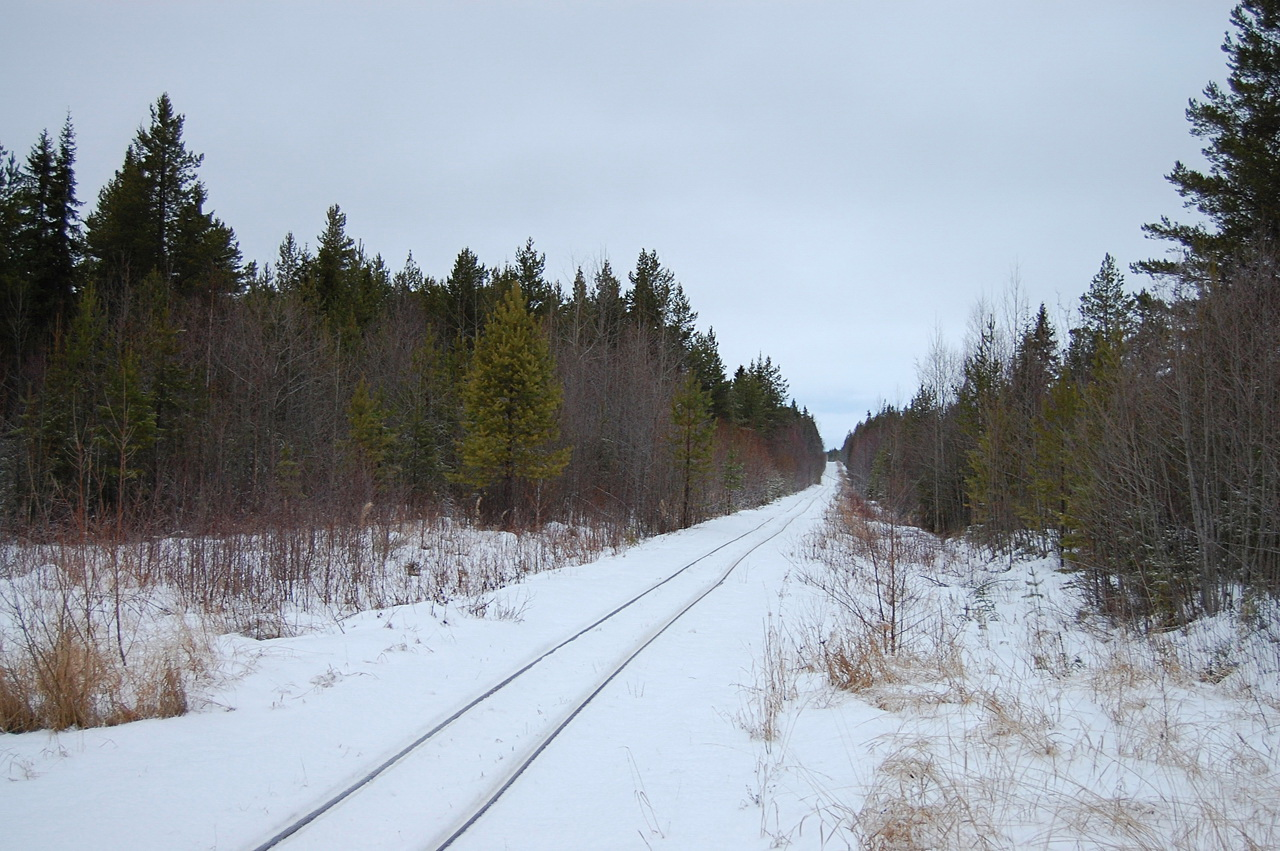
Forest railway

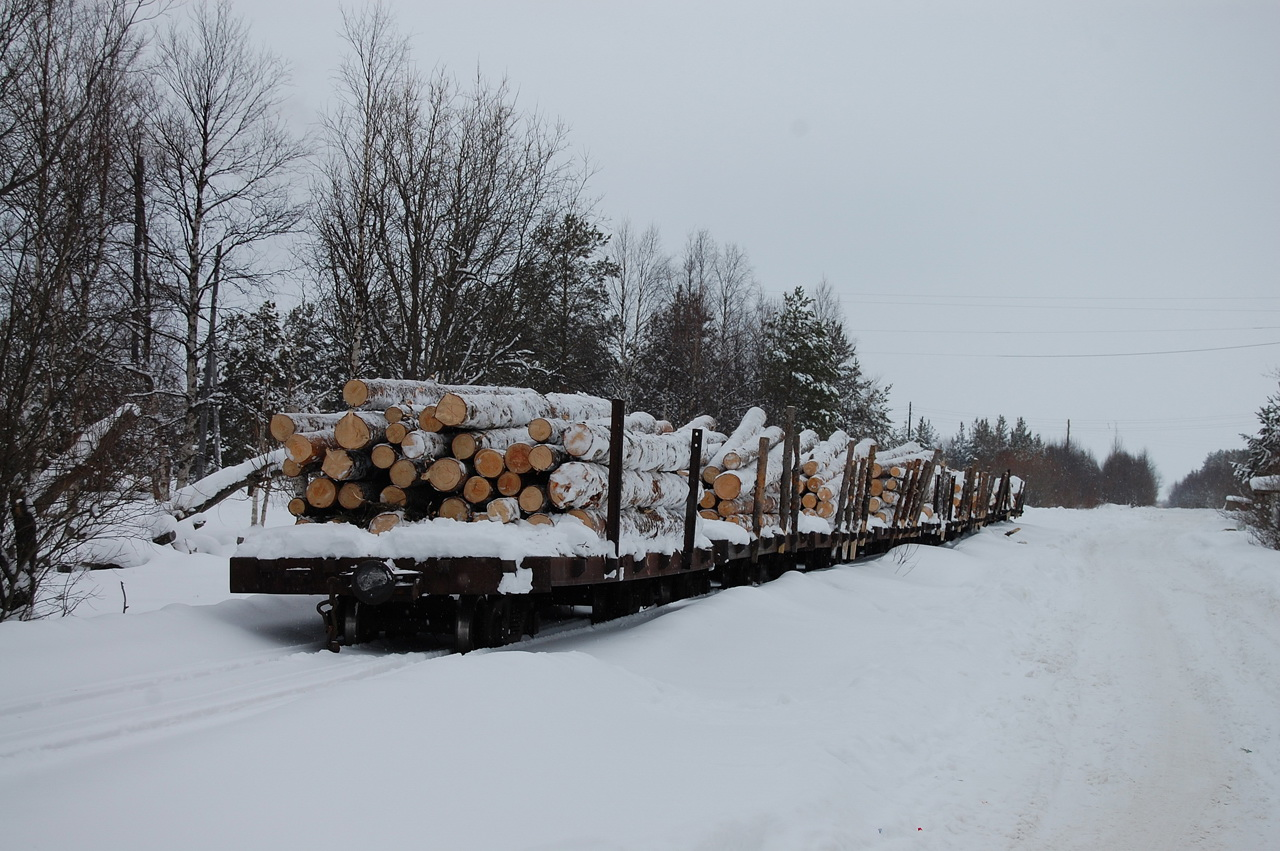
Freight cars, Vodogon Station

== See also ==
- Narrow-gauge railways in Russia
