= Suprun =

Suprun (Ukrainian: Супрун) is a surname of Ukrainian origin. It is derived from the Ukrainian first name "Suprun", "Sopron", "Sophron" and "Saphronij", which originate from the Ancient Greek: Σώφρων, Latin: Sophron.

The following people share this last name:

- Inna Suprun (born 1983), Ukrainian biathlete
- Liudmyla Suprun (born 1965), Ukrainian politician
- Marina Suprun (born 1962), Soviet rower
- Mikhail Suprun (born 1955), Russian historian
- Stepan Suprun (1907–1941), Soviet aviator
- Ulana Suprun (born 1963), Ukrainian-American physician and activist
- Volodymyr Suprun (born 1994), Ukrainian sprinter
