= Golosov Ravine =

Deep ravine in Moscow, Russia

Coordinates: 55°39′47″N 37°39′46″E

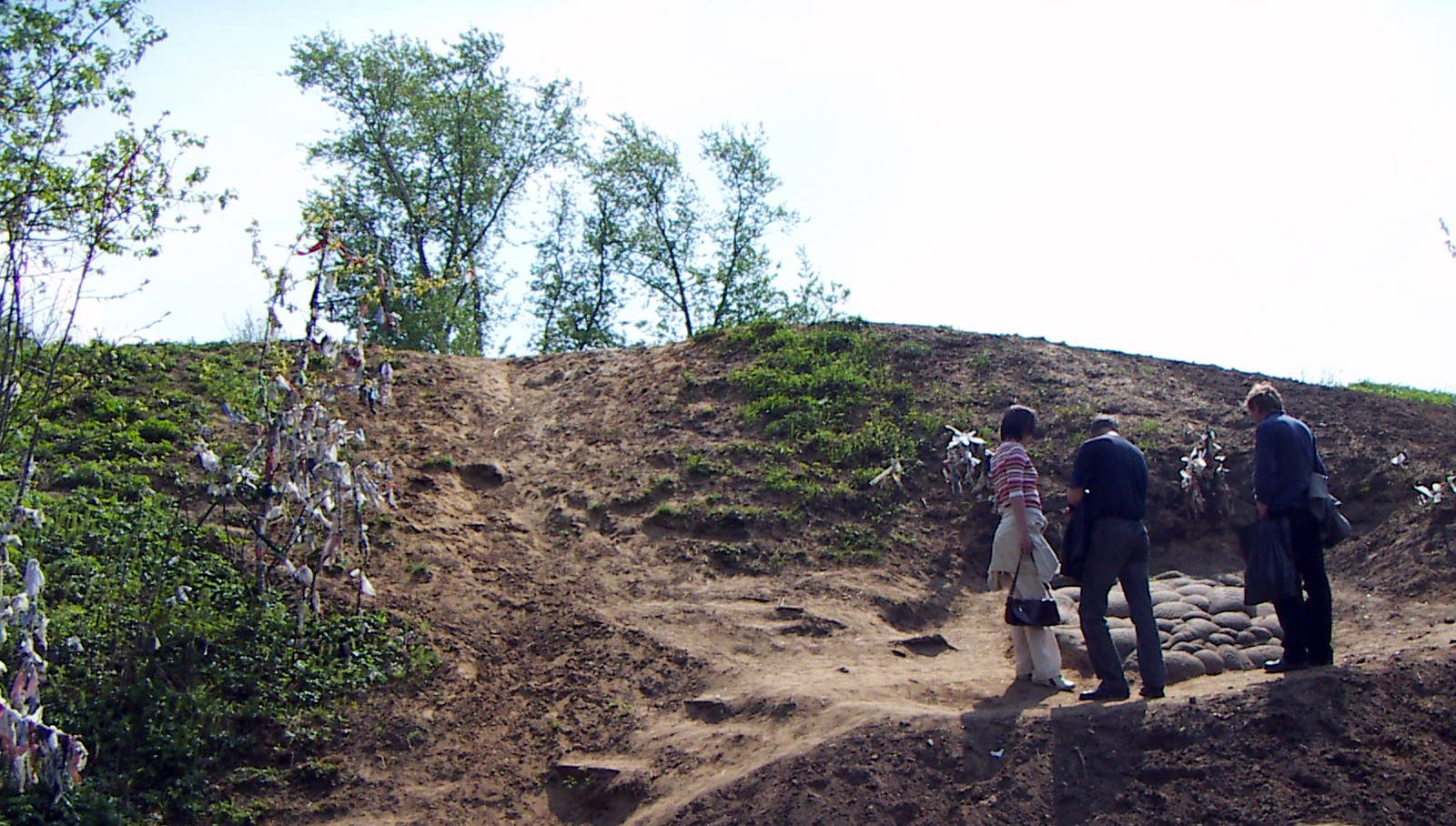
Stone veneration in Kolomenskoe

Golosov Ravine (Голосов Овраг), also known as Vlasov (Власов) ravine is a deep ravine located in Moscow, Russia. It is situated between the Kolomenskoe Hill and Dyakovo Hill and contains several springs and a brook at its bottom. On the left side of the ravine, there is a Neopagan shrine that centers around two revered "sacred stones". In 2006–2007, while Kolomenskoye was being reconstructed, efforts were made to strengthen the edges of the ravine. This included the construction of sturdy pathways and stairs along the sides of the ravine, making it more accessible and safe for visitors.

== Overview ==
Located in the southern part of Moscow is the notable village of Kolomenskoye, which has transformed into a historical public open space. It covers an area of over 250 hectares. The symbol of this park is the Church of the Ascension, which is included in the Lists of World Heritage Sites of UNESCO. Every day, about 10,000 people come to admire this recreation area, and they are attracted not only by the unique architectural monuments but also by the numerous mysteries that the former summer residence of the Russian tsars still holds. Where can one find the Lost Library of Ivan the Terrible, and is it possible to "jump" into the past by descending into Golosov Ravine.

For a significant period of time, Golosov Ravine has been a subject of numerous myths and folklore. This geological feature previously acted as a natural barrier, separating the villages of Kolomenskoye and Dyakovo, and presently serves as a dividing line within the park itself.

== Hypothetical explanation attempts ==
Geologists have a different perspective on the origin of Golosov ravine compared to the popular "fairy tale" version. Their data suggests that the ravine is actually a modified valley that was once part of an ancient river network, formed as a result of the river drying up. This means that the stones found at the bottom of the ravine most likely traveled from a distant location to end up in the capital. These stones were potentially transported by a slow-moving glacier near the Karelian Isthmus. Whether this theory holds true or not, some of these boulders have already gained a significant amount of legends and beliefs surrounding them.

From a geological perspective, it is also worth noting that Moscow is situated in the center of the Eastern European Plain and boasts a robust geological composition. Nevertheless, it is important to acknowledge the presence of significant faults in Moscow, with the largest one running beneath the ravine. This fault emits powerful jets of radiation, while the ravine itself is positioned in a strictly east-west direction, seemingly impacting the integrity of the natural magnetic field in the surrounding environment.

In 1995-1996, scientists from the Prokhorov Institute of General Physics of the Russian Academy of Sciences conducted measurements of the electromagnetic field in close proximity to the ravine. The findings were rather unexpected: it was discovered that the electromagnetic field in the ravine exceeded the reference value by a staggering factor of 12, while it was 27 times higher in the vicinity of the "sacred" stones. Curiously, a cell phone may experience sudden battery drainage in the ravine, and the compass needle may deviate towards the epicenter of the ravine instead of pointing north.

== The sacred stones ==
The "sacred stones of Kolomenskoe" are a pair of local sandstone rocks of peculiar shape, located high in the ravine. Some sources mistakenly suggest that they are glacial granite boulders, but this is not accurate. Both rocks show evidence of human manipulation, both in the past (as their shapes have been exaggerated) and in the present (as they have been vandalized with modern graffiti). Originally, the stones were situated closer to the springs in the ravine, but they were relocated to their current position during one of the park's renovations in the Soviet era.

=== Modern veneration practices ===
The stones have their own names: one is called Deviy (or Devichiy, Russian: Девий, Девичий, meaning "Virgin"), and is associated by modern worshipers with giving fertility to women, while the other one is called Gus’ (Гусь, meaning "Goose"). According to local legends, these trees possess the ability to heal specific ailments, which is why individuals flock to sit beside them. Additionally, people engage in the practice of attaching small scraps of cloth onto the surrounding trees as a form of ritualistic offering.

=== History of the veneration ===
Based on certain sources, it has been suggested that the stones did not receive consistent reverence from the people living in the area during the 20th century. This lack of continuous veneration raises the possibility that the tradition surrounding these stones may have experienced interruptions or changes, deviating from the established practices that were observed in the past, although the exact nature of these practices remains uncertain.

== Springs ==
The nearby springs are also considered sacred (miracle-bearing) in contemporary Eastern Orthodoxy, Neopagan and New-Age traditions. Before the Revolution of 1917 there was a wooden chapel standing on top of (or near?) the springs, which implies that the springs were considered "sacred" or "holy" in the past as well. Several springs have (or had) their own names: Kadochka (literally: "Little Tub"; seemingly the most venerated one, with its sub-springs associated with St. George and Our Lady of Kazan); Peter and Paul's spring; the spring of the 12 apostles; St. Nicholas spring. Some of these springs were destroyed during the recent renovation works in the ravine.

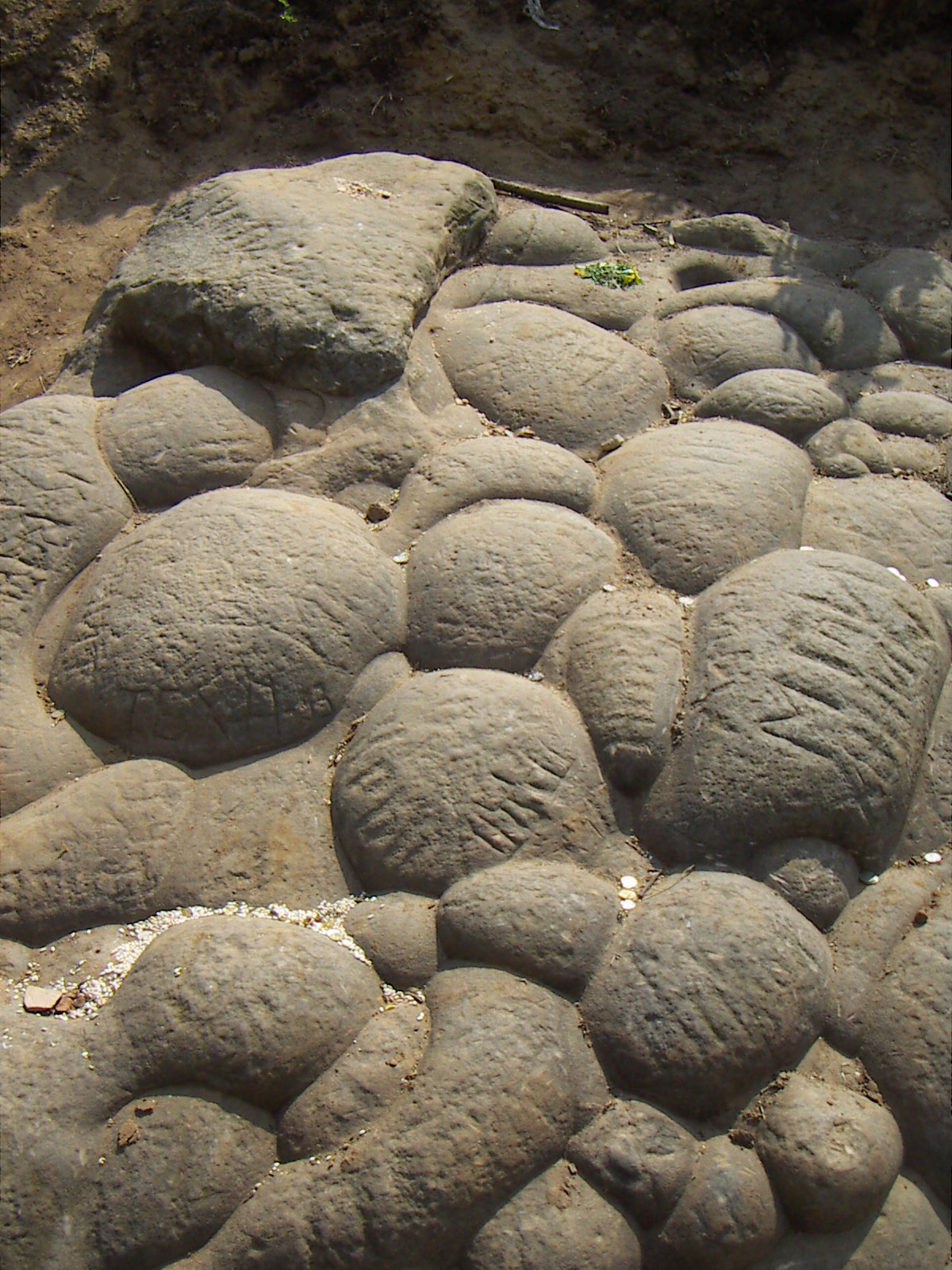
Diviy Stone surface
