= Nikolo-Korelsky Monastery =

Coordinates: 64°34′59″N 39°50′48″E

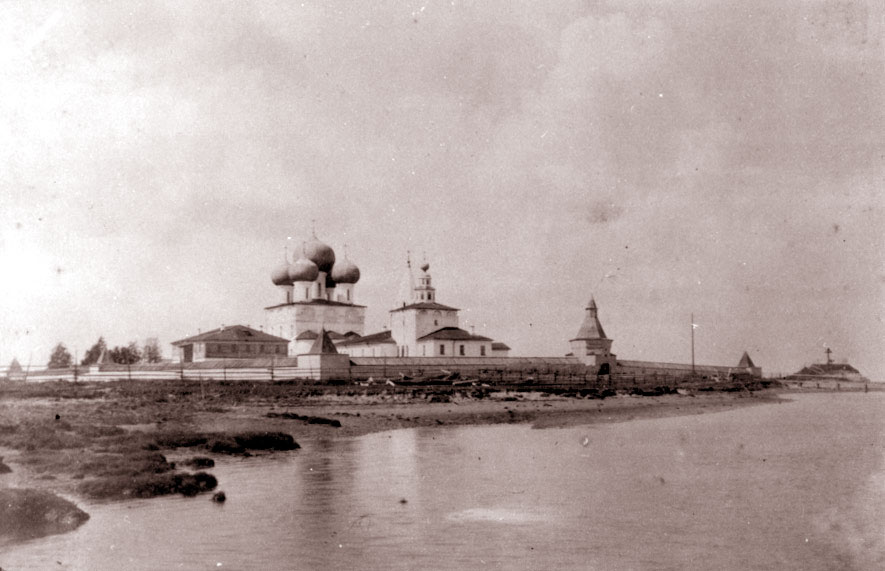
View of the Karelian Monastery of St. Nicholas in the early 20th century

Nikolo-Korelsky Monastery (Николо-Корельский монастырь) is a Russian Orthodox monastery in Severodvinsk (Russia).

This monastery is believed to have been founded by St. Euphemius, an Orthodox missionary in the Karelian lands. In 1419, the Swedes burnt down the Nikolo-Korelsky Monastery. The abbey stood in ruins until 1471, when two sons of Marfa Boretskaya were killed by a vicious storm and their bodies were recovered on the beach near the monastery twelve days later. At the urging of Boretskaya, the monastery was restored and her sons were buried there.

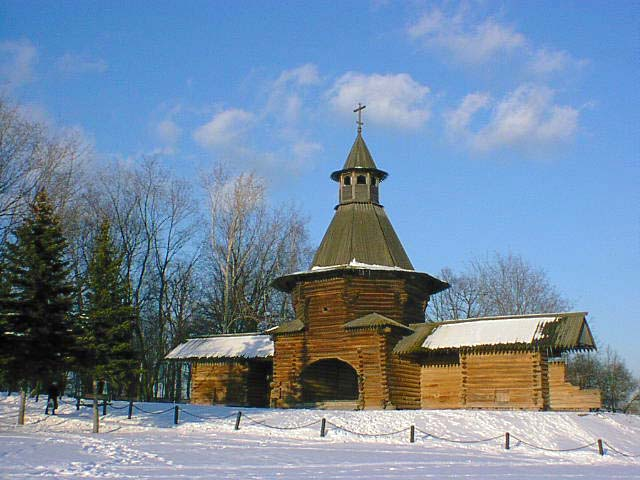
Entrance to the Karelian Monastery of St. Nicholas (1691), now in the Kolomenskoe Museum of Moscow

On 24 August 1553, a ship of Richard Chancellor reached the salt-mining settlement of Nenoksa, which is still famous for its traditional wooden architecture. The British sailors proceeded to the Nikolo-Korelsky Monastery, where they were surprised to find a community of "sailors in soutanes" and a pier large enough to accommodate several ships. The main church of this extraordinary establishment was dedicated to Saint Nicholas, the holy patron of sailors; hence, the whole White Sea became known in the 16th-century English maps as "St. Nicholas Bay".

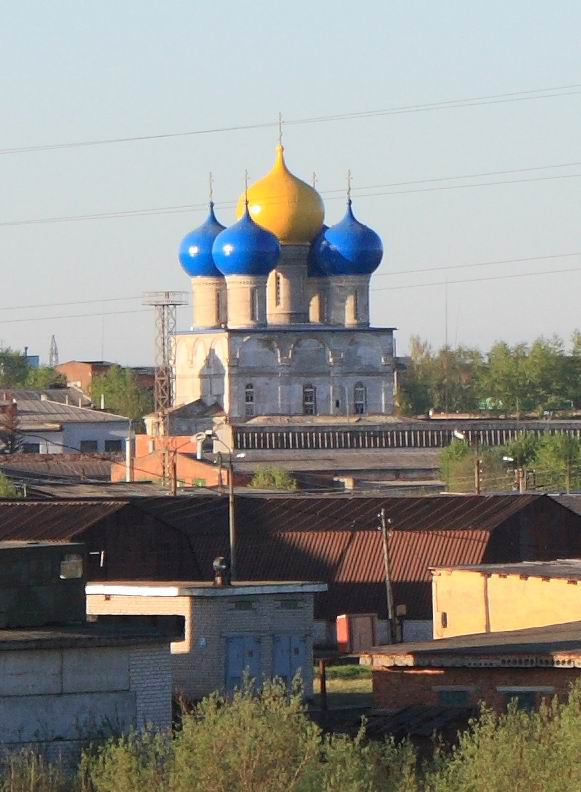
The St. Nicolas Cathedral after the restoration works in 2000s

The Nikolo-Karelsky Monastery flourished after the establishment of the Muscovy Company, as the bulk of their trade passed through the local harbour. In late 1613, the complex was captured and looted by Polish-Lithuanian vagabonds, the Lisowczycy. In August 1618, the harbour was visited by John Tradescant the elder, who conducted a survey of an island situated opposite the monastery.

The extant buildings of the monastery were constructed at the close of the Muscovite period. The five-domed cathedral of St. Nicholas was built in 1670–74, preceded by the Assumption church (1664–67), to which it is joined by a gallery. Several decades later, the walls and towers were built of timber; the best preserved of these towers was transported by the Soviets to Kolomenskoe, Moscow, where it may be seen to this day.

After the Revolution, the Monastery was abolished. The 17th-century buildings of the Nikolo-Korelsky monastery were adapted and are still used for shipbuilding purposes.
