= Mikhail Suprun =

Russian historian (born 1955)

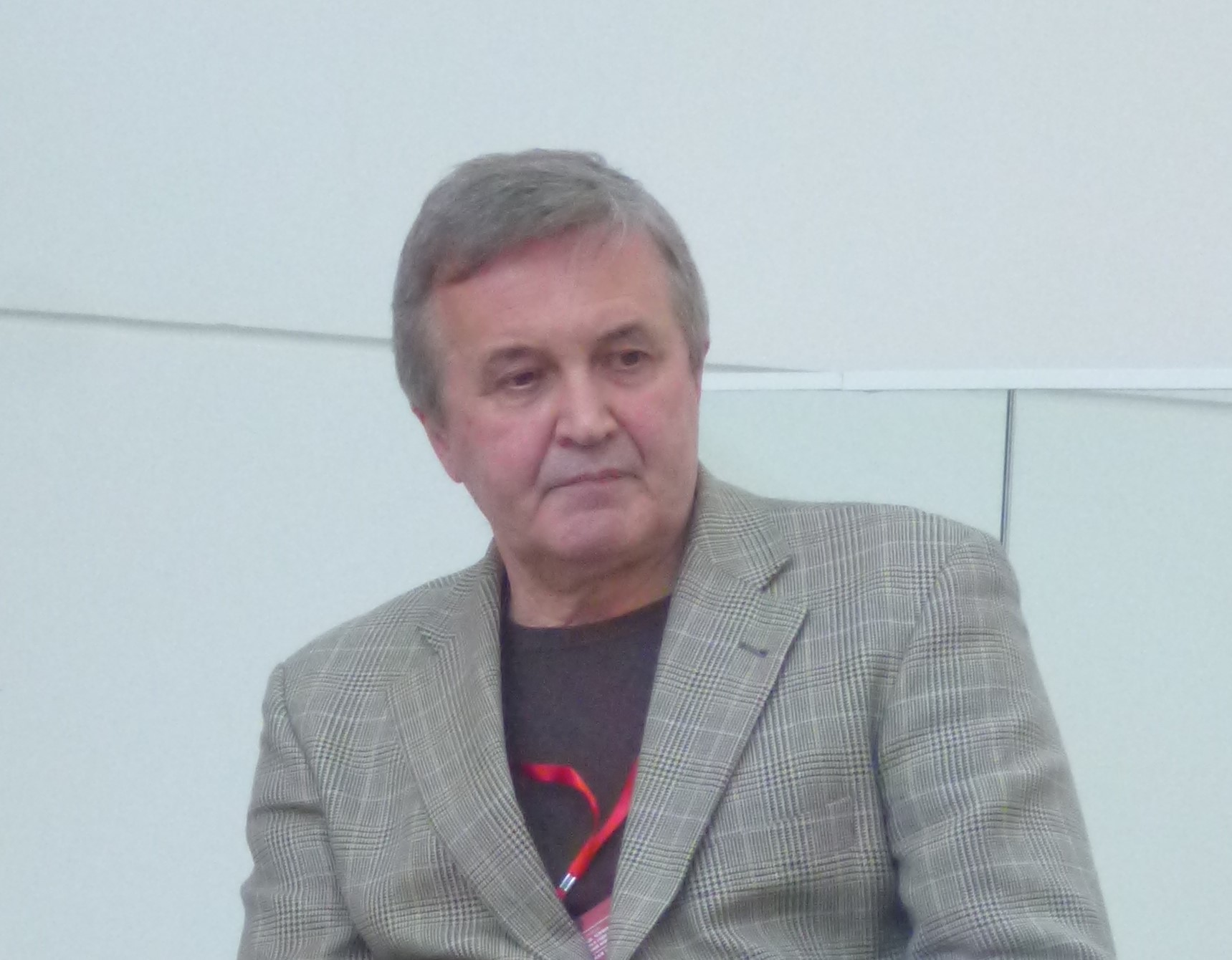
Suprun in 2021

Mikhail Suprun (Russian: Михаил Николаевич Супрун; born 5 April 1955 in Severodvinsk) is a Russian historian and professor of the Pomor State named after M. V. Lomonosov, now Northern (Arctic) Federal University. In 2009, he was arrested in connection with a book he wrote on what Open Democracy has called a "trumped up charge".

== Academic career ==
Mr.Suprun graduated from the Pomor State University (now The Northern Arctic Federal University), then – from the Leningrad branch of the Institute of History of the Academy of Sciences of the USSR, and later from the Institute of Russian History of the Academy of Sciences in Moscow, where he defended his doctoral dissertation on "Lend-lease and the Northern Convoys". As senior visitor he lectured and made a research at the Moscow State University (1989), Oxford University (1994), George Washington University (1998–1999), the Krakow Jagiellonian University (2000), the University of Tromsø (2003), the Institute of History of the Polish Academy of Sciences (2009). He is the author of over 180 scientific works, including 14 books as well as the compiler, editor and author of the year-books "The Northern Convoys: studies, memoirs and documents" (Moscow-Arkhangelsk, 1991–2001) and "The Forced Labor and the Political Exile in the North of Russia" (SPtb -Arhangelsk, 2003–2010). Leader of the archeological expedition "Echo of the war", member of the editorial board of "The Journal of Slavic Military Studies' He received a PhD in 1984. In 1996, he earned the title of Doctor Habilitated from the Institute of Russian History, Russian Academy of Sciences.

== Arkhangelsk Affair ==
=== Arrest ===
In 2009, Suprun was arrested by the FSB for his investigations into the fate of Germans imprisoned in the Soviet Union during the Second World War and after the war. This has been dubbed the "Arkhangelsk Affair". Suprun is accused of infringing Article 137 of the Russian Criminal Code, which prohibits the exposing of "personal or family secrets" of victims of Soviet repression if their consent has not been given. Police Colonel Alexander Dudarev, head of the Internal Ministry archives of the Arkhangelsk Region, is also being prosecuted for giving Suprun permission to access the archives in order to do his research.

=== Trial ===
In September 2011, the trial of Suprun and Dudarev began behind closed doors. The case was adjourned in December before a verdict was given, according to the charity Memorial in order to avoid negative publicity before Russia's parliamentary elections.

== Works ==
- "Архангельск в годы Великой Отечественной войны". Ленинград, 1984
- "Политическая ссылка на Европейском Севере в конце 19 - начале 20 вв. Выпуск 1. 1895-1905 гг. Вологда, 1989 (co-author С.Я.Косухкин)
- "Люфтваффе под Полярной Звездой". Архангельск, 1996 (co-author Р.И.Ларинцев)
- "Ленд-лиз и северные конвои, 1941-1945 гг." М., 1997.
- "Освобождение Восточного Финнмарка, 1944 - 1945 гг." (co-author А. and В. Гёртер).
- "Frigjoringen I Nord-Norge 1944-1945". Vadso, 2015 (co-author А. and W. Gorter).
