= Beloye Ozero =

Beloye Ozero Белое Озеро
- Selo
- Location within Bashkortostan Location within Russia
- Coordinates: 53°59′N 56°13′E
- Country: Russia
- Region: Bashkortostan
- District: Gafuriysky District
- Time zone: UTC+5:00

Beloye Ozero (Russian: Белое Озеро; Bashkir: Аҡ Күл, Aq Kül) is a rural locality (a selo) and the administrative centre of Beloozersky Selsoviet, Gafuriysky District, Bashkortostan, Russia. The population was 1,325 as of 2010. There are 20 streets.

== Geography ==
Beloye Ozero is located 30 km northwest of Krasnousolsky (the district's administrative centre) by road. Daryino is the nearest rural locality.
