= Kolomenskoye =

Old royal estate in Moscow, Russia

Church of the Ascension, Kolomenskoye
UNESCO World Heritage Site
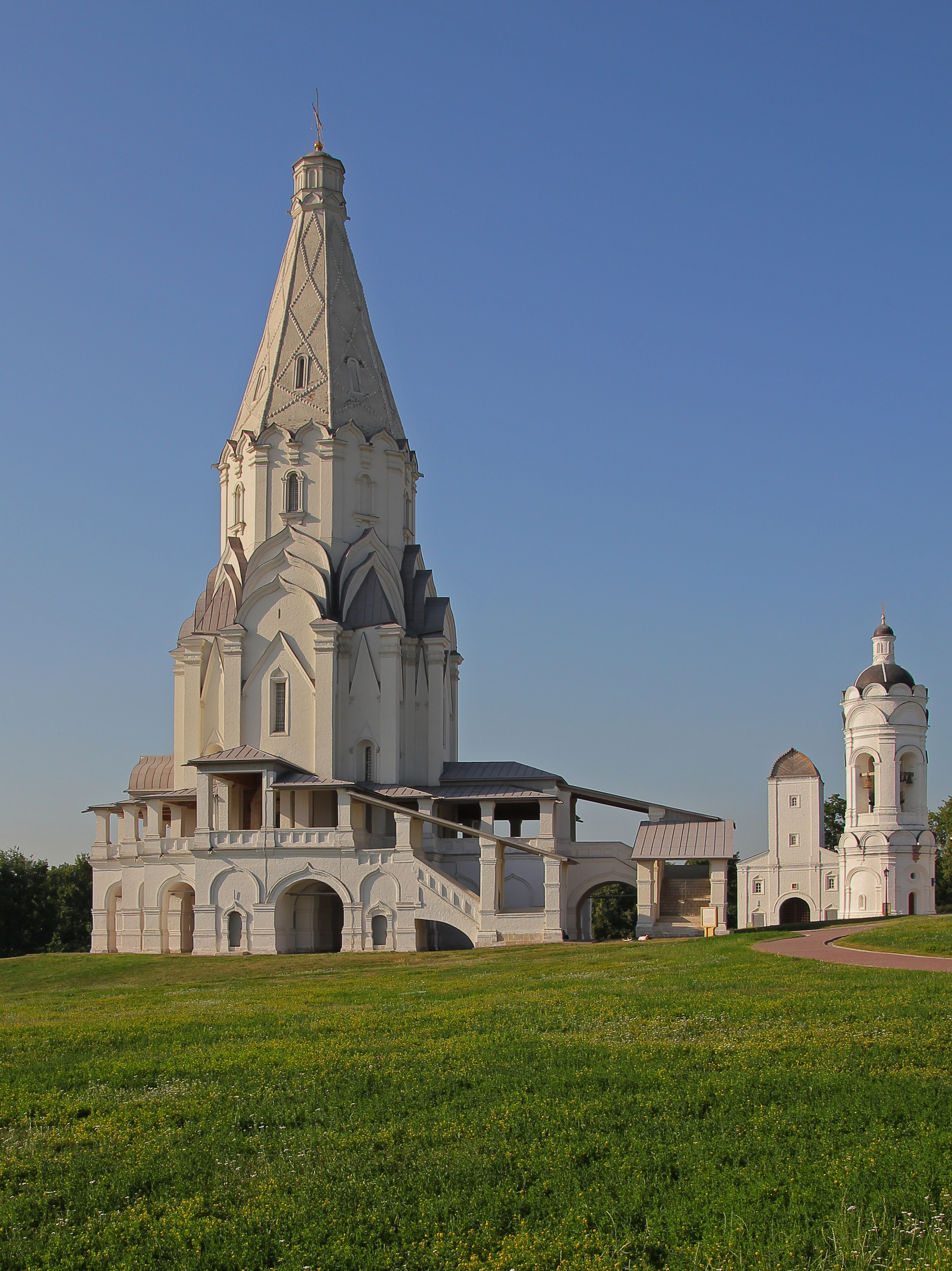
- Ascension Church (1532)

- Location within European Russia Location within Europe
- Location: Moscow, Russia
- Criteria: Cultural: ii
- Reference: 634
- Inscription: 1994 (18th Session)
- Website: Official site
- Coordinates: 55°40′10″N 37°40′08″E

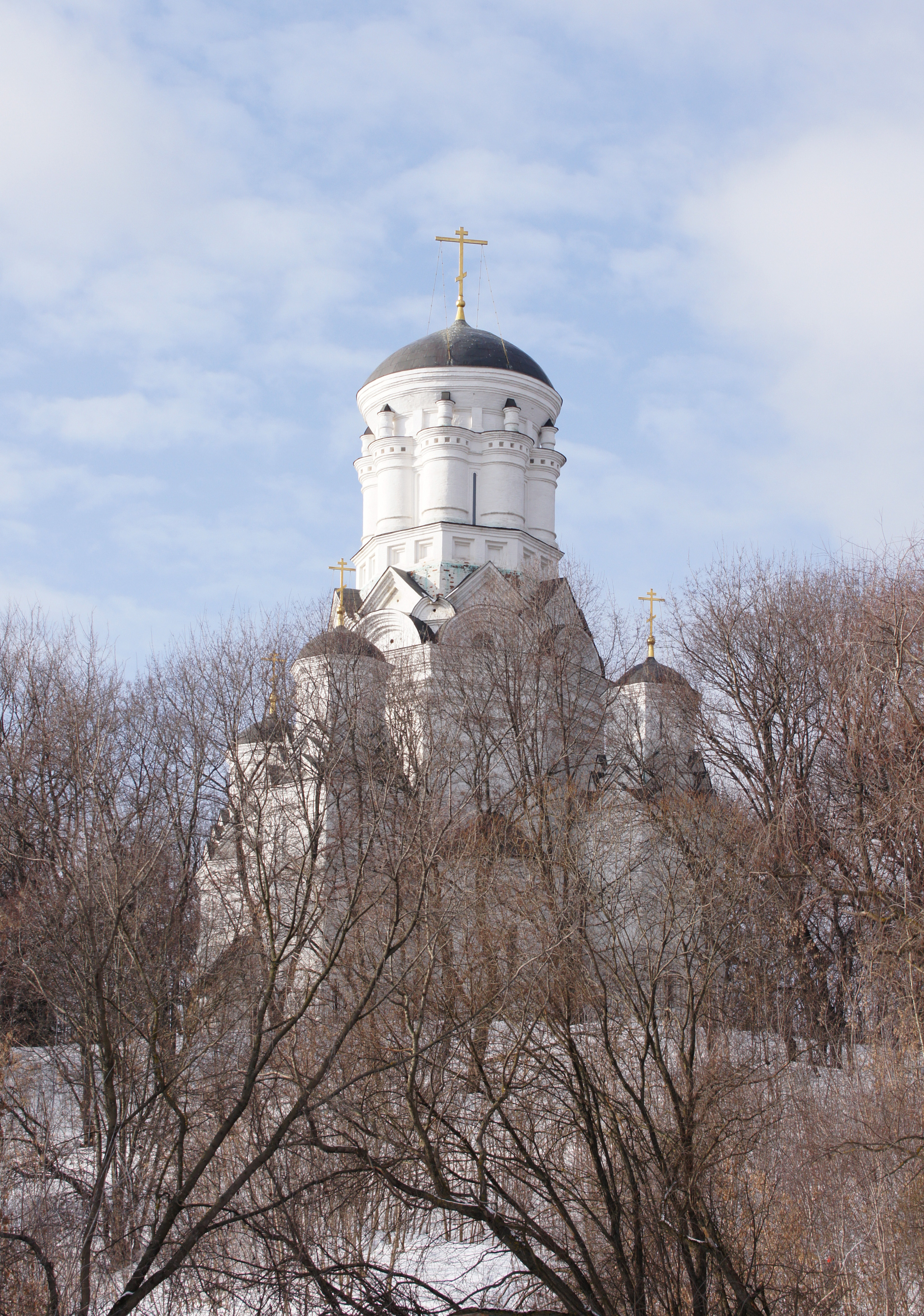
Church of John the Baptist in Dyakovo

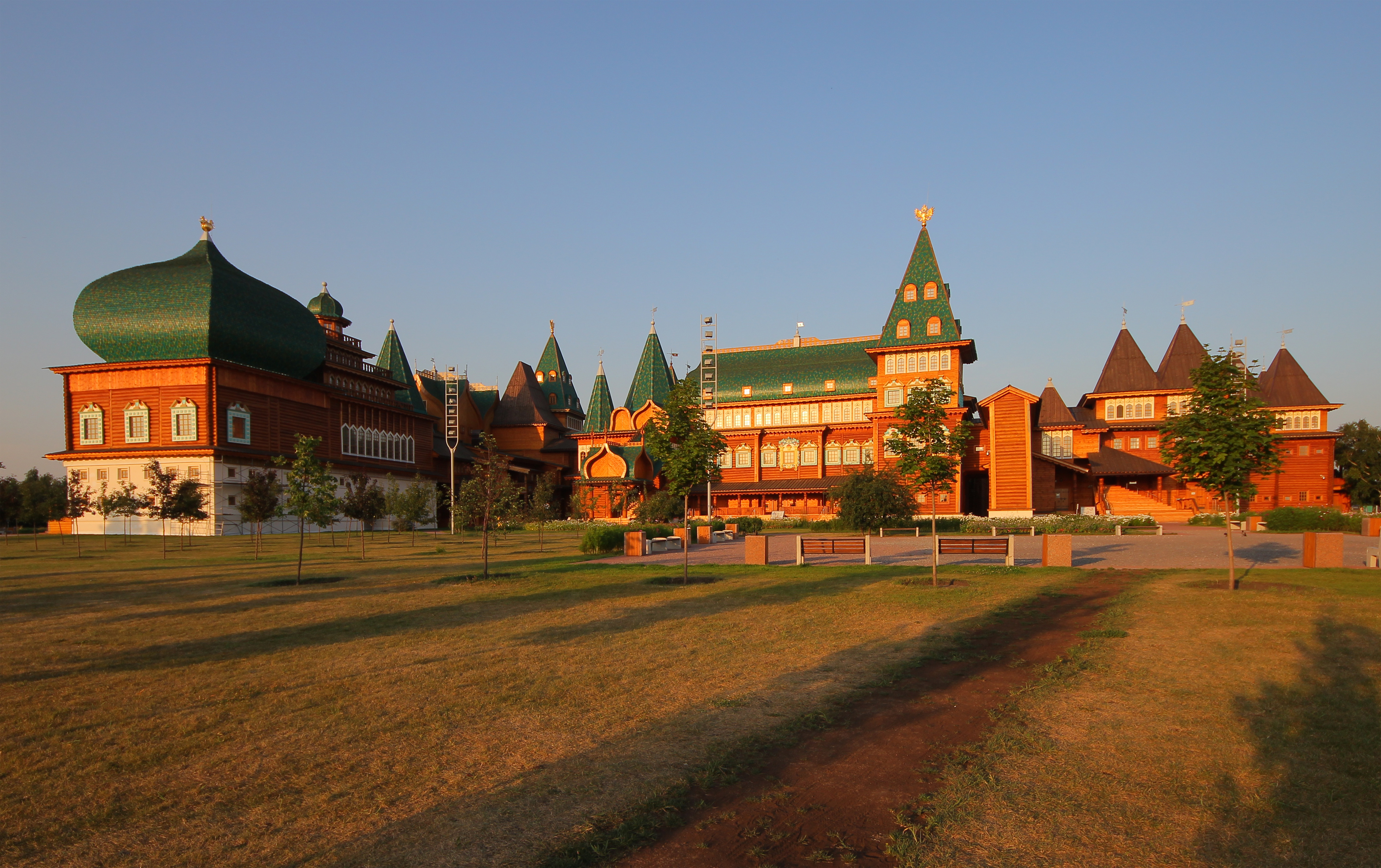
A modern reconstruction of the Wooden palace (2011)

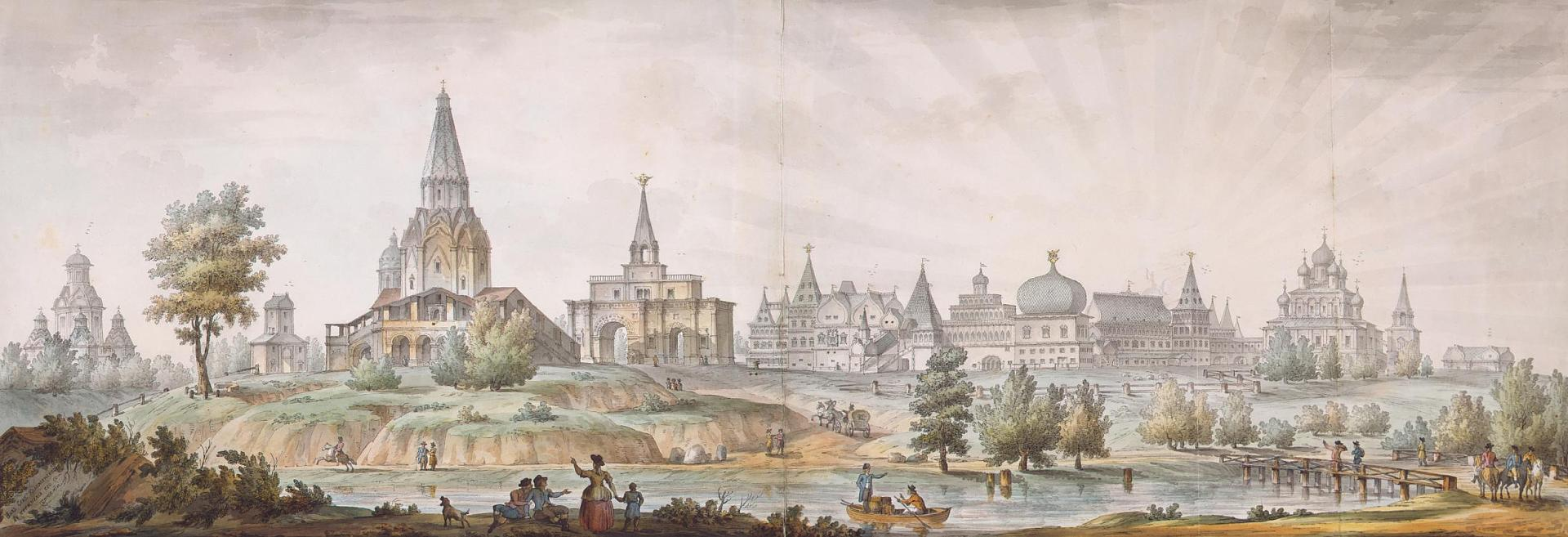
Panorama of Kolomenskoye, 18th century. Watercolor from the original drawing of Giacomo Quarenghi

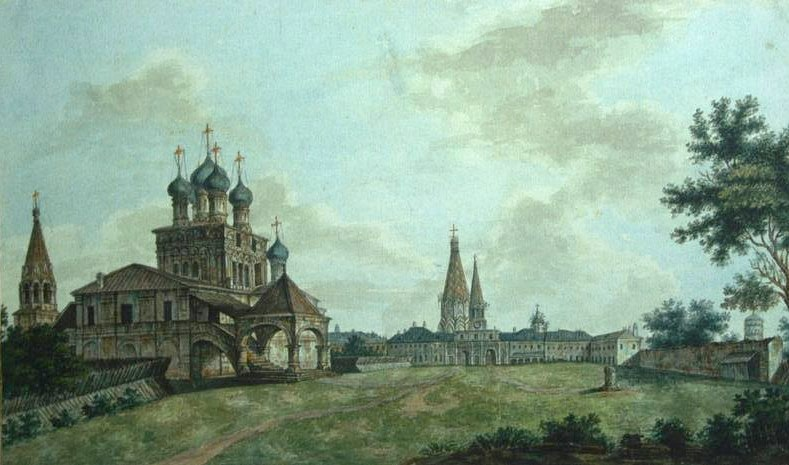
View of Kolomenskoye by Fyodor Alexeyev (19th century)

Kolomenskoye (Russian: Коло́менское) is a former royal estate situated several kilometers to the southeast of the city center of Moscow, Russia, on the ancient road leading to the town of Kolomna (hence the name). The 390 hectare scenic area overlooks the steep banks of the Moskva River. It became a part of Moscow in the 1960s.

== The White Column of Kolomenskoye ==
Kolomenskoye village was first mentioned in the testament of Ivan Kalita (1339). As time went by, the village was developed as a favourite country estate of grand princes of Muscovy. The earliest existing structure is the exceptional Ascension church (1532), built in white stone to commemorate the long-awaited birth of an heir to the throne, the future Ivan the Terrible. Being the first stone church of tent-like variety, the uncanonical "White Column" (as it is sometimes referred to) marked a stunning break from the Byzantine tradition.

The church reaches toward the sky from a low cross-shaped podklet (ground floor), followed by a prolonged chetverik (octagonal body, and then an octagonal tent, crowned by a tiny dome. The narrow pilasters on the sides of the chetverik, the arrow-shaped window frames, the three tiers of the kokoshniks and the quiet rhythm of stair arcades and open galleries underline the dynamic tendency of this masterpiece of the Russian architecture. The whole vertical composition is believed to have been borrowed from hipped roof-style wooden churches of the Russian North. Recognizing its outstanding value for humanity, UNESCO decided to inscribe the church on the World Heritage List in 1994.

== The great palace and other structures ==
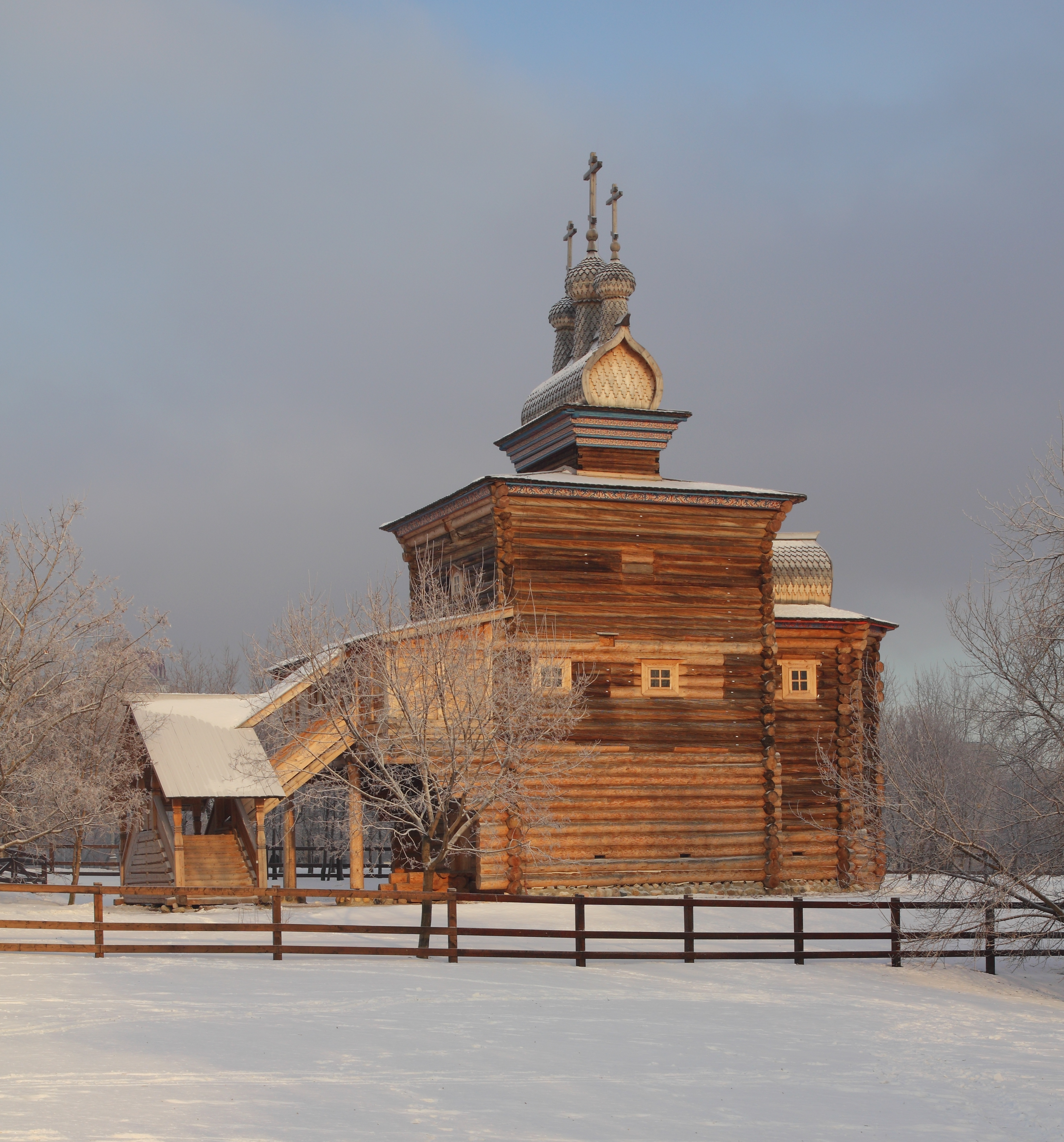
Kolomenskoe Museum-Reserve in Moscow. Wooden Saint George Church.

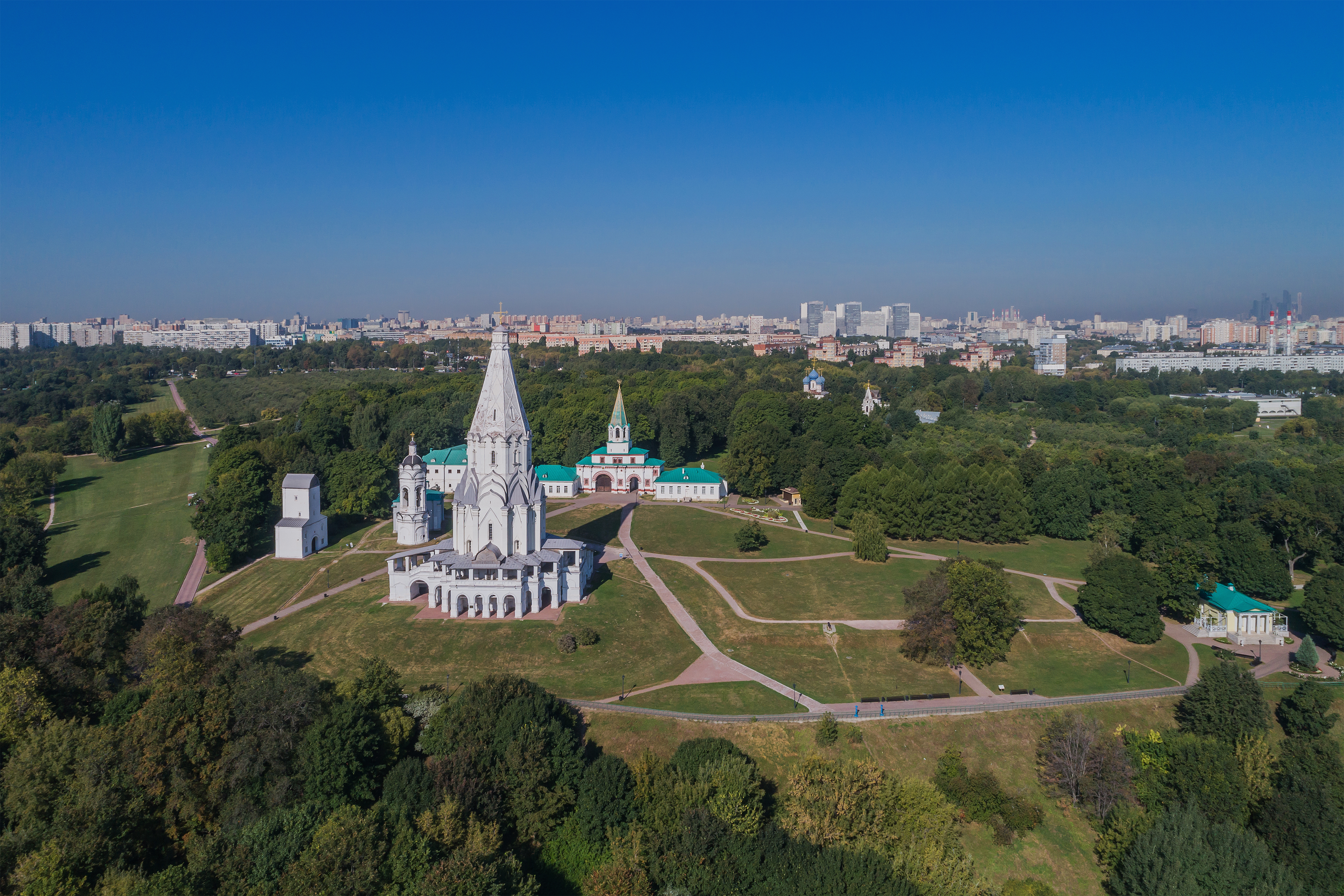
Aerial view of Kolomenskoye

Tsar Alexis I had all the previous wooden structures in Kolomenskoye demolished and replaced them with a new great wooden palace, famed for its fanciful, fairytale roofs. Foreigners referred to this huge maze of intricate corridors and 250 rooms as "an Eighth Wonder of the World". Although basically only a summer palace, it was the favorite residence of Tsar Alexis I. The future Empress Elizabeth Petrovna was born in the palace in 1709, and Tsar Peter the Great spent part of his youth here. Upon the departure of the court for Saint Petersburg, the palace fell into disrepair, so that Catherine II refused to make it her Moscow residence. On her orders, the wooden palace was demolished in 1768 and replaced with a much more modest stone-and-brick structure.

Detailed plans of the Alexis I palace survived. The Moscow Government completed a full-scale reconstruction in 2010. The rebuilt palace stands approximately 1 kilometer (0.62 mi) to the south of its original location near the White Column, in order to preserve the historic foundations. The palace erected by Catherine the Great in 1768 was demolished in 1872, and only a few gates and outside buildings remain.

During the early Soviet period, under the initiative of architect and restorer Pyotr Baranovsky, old wooden buildings and various artifacts were transported to Kolomenskoye from different parts of the USSR for preservation, so currently Kolomenskoye Park hosts an impressive set of different constructions and historical objects.

=== Local buildings ===
- Church of John the Baptist in Dyakovo, 16th century. The church stands on the Dyakovo hill, located southwest from the Kolomenskoye hill. The church has five tent-like structures, and was probably constructed around 1547, reputedly by architect Postnik Yakovlev, the author of Saint Basil's Cathedral on the Red Square.
- Church of Saint George, 16th century
- Standalone belltower for the church of St. George, 16th century
- Standalone refectory for the church of St. George, 16th century
- Church of Our Lady of Kazan, 17th century
- Watertower, 17th century
- Front gates, 1671–1673
- Polkovhichyi chambers, 17th century
- Prikaznye chambers, 17th century
- Sytny yard, 17th century
- Back gates, 17th century
- Park pavilion, 1825
- Park gates, 19th century

=== Constructions and artifacts brought from elsewhere ===
- Barbican church of the Nikolo-Korelsky Monastery
- Bratsk Stockade Tower
- Boris stone from Belarus
- Kurgan stele, from a Polovtsian burial mound
- Chasovoy pole, 17th century
- Tower from the Sumskoy Ostrog fortress, 17th century
- Memorial pole from Shaydorovo village, 19th century
- Mead making facility, 18th century
- Peter the Great house (18th century) from the Northern Dvina
- Lion's Gates from the Moscow Kremlin (surviving fragments)

=== Reconstructions ===
- Water mill on the Zhuzha River

=== Natural features ===
- Oak-trees grove (one of the oldest oaks in Moscow)
- Golosov Ravine with sacred stones and springs in it
- Zhuzha River, emerging from underground
- Kolomenskoye Stream, in Golosov Ravine
- Kolutushkin Stream, in the ravine of that name
- Dyakovskaya Stream, in the ravine of that name, into which several other ravines empty (all on the left: Vospenkov, Lekseev, Bazarihin, Radyushin)

=== Archeological sites ===
- Dyakovo settlement

== See also ==
- Tsaritsyno Park
- Kuskovo
- Arkhangelskoye Estate
- Open-air museum
