= Submarine incident off Kildin Island =

1992 US–Russia nuclear submarine collision

- Part of Operation Holy Stone
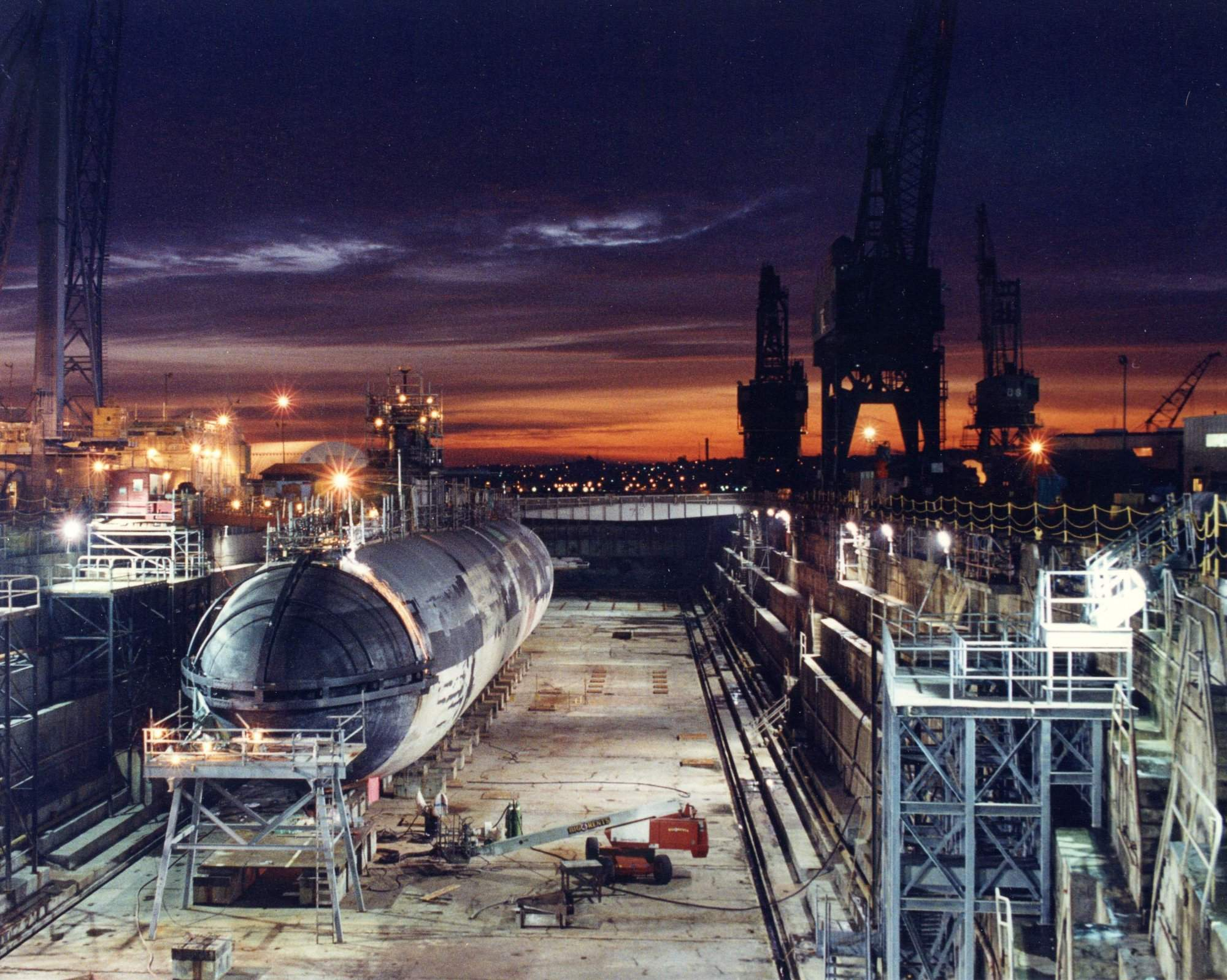
- USS Baton Rouge awaiting disposal at Mare Island (1995)
Date	11 February 1992
Location	North of Murmansk, Russia 69°38′42″N 33°46′54″E
Result	USS Baton Rouge written off

Belligerents
United States	Russia

Commanders and leaders
Captain Gordon D. Cremer	Cdr. Igor Lokot

Strength
1 Los Angeles-class submarine	1 Sierra-class submarine

Casualties and losses
1 nuclear submarine heavily damaged	1 nuclear submarine damaged
- Location within Russia

The submarine incident off Kildin Island was a collision between the US Navy nuclear submarine USS Baton Rouge and the Russian Navy nuclear submarine B-276 Kostroma near the Russian naval base of Severomorsk on 11 February 1992. The incident occurred while the US unit was engaged in a covert mission, apparently aimed at intercepting Russian military communications. Although most sources claim that the American submarine was trailing her Russian counterpart, some authors believe that neither Kostroma nor Baton Rouge had been able to locate each other before the collision.

== Background ==
Following the fall of the Soviet Union in 1991, uncertainty prevailed among the US intelligence community about the attitude of the former Soviet forces, especially the strategic assets that remained under Russian control. The American government tasked the Navy to continue keeping a close watch on the main bases of Russian nuclear submarines to monitor developments. During the Cold War, this type of submarine surveillance was known as "Operation Holy Stone;" submariners nicknamed the program "Operation Pinnacle" or "Bollard". Author Jeffrey T. Richelson maintains that "Holy Stone" continued unabated and that the 1992 incident was part of the operation. This intelligence-gathering included tapping Soviet submarine communication cables, recording the pattern of noises from Soviet submarines, and observing submarine-launched ballistic missile tests.

== Collision ==
=== Blind encounter ===
The collision occurred at 8:16 pm local time, at a point slightly over 12 miles from the shoreline, in waters that the United States regarded as international, and that Russia considered as five miles inside the Russian territorial sea (due to the Russian use of a straight baseline). The mission of Baton Rouge off Severomorsk was reportedly the recovery or delivery of intelligence-monitoring devices on the seabed. The American press claimed that the submarine had been checking wireless traffic between Russian bases, but the Russian counterpart asserted that the two boats were engaged in a 'cat-and-mouse game', an opinion also supported by several Western sources. According to naval analyst Eugene Miasnikov, the amount of antisubmarine surveillance deployed by the Russians along their shores makes the first possibility implausible. He asserts that the second argument also seems to be weak given the circumstances and that the collision itself seemed to have happened by chance. The breaking waves and the shallow waters of that area of the Barents Sea prevented early enemy detection by either submarine. At the time of the incident, both vessels were using only passive sonars. Miasnikov maintains that the submarines of the Los Angeles class are unable to detect acoustic signals from targets located within a cone of 60 degrees astern, thus the most probable scenario was that Kostroma approached Baton Rouge from behind. Indeed, the collision took place when the Kostroma was surfacing, hitting the US submarine underneath on her aft section. The Sierra class sonar is also ‘deaf’ to the aft direction; her usual pattern of acoustic search is moving along a loop course. The incident, however, implied that Russian attack submarines are capable of avoiding passive acoustic detection, at least under certain conditions.

=== Damage ===
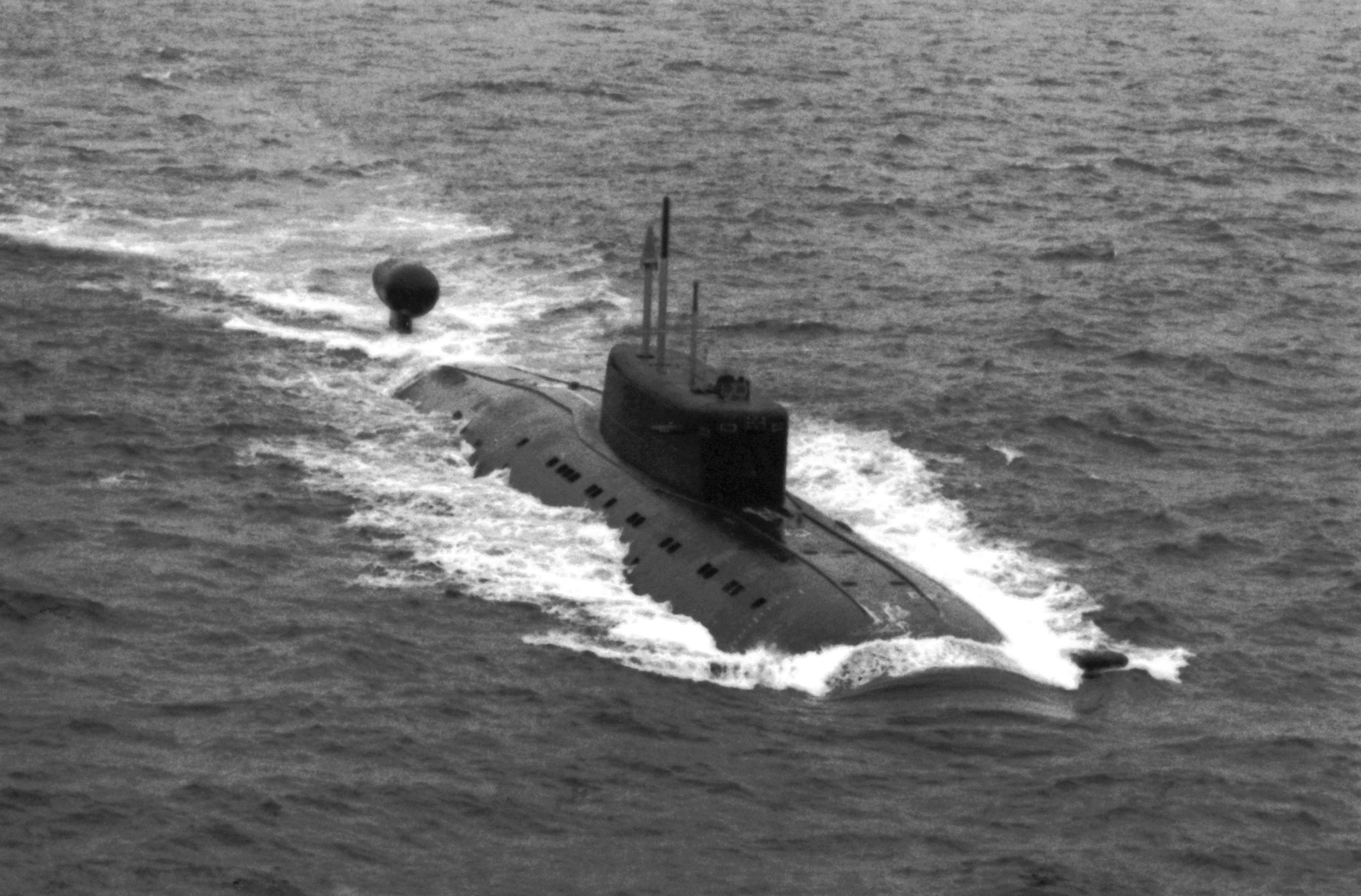
A Sierra-class submarine

Both submarines sustained damage, but no casualties were reported. Russian reports and American aerial surveillance agree that Kostroma's sail was dented on her front section. Russian navy sources reportedly found pieces of composite material from Baton Rouge's anti-sonar tiles. The US Navy claimed that besides some scratches, dents, and two minor cuts on her port ballast tank, Baton Rouge did not suffer major damage. But in any case, it was serious since any rupture on the single hull of Baton Rouge would have compromised her pressure resistance. The deactivation of Baton Rouge was announced on 17 September 1993, although some sources claim that the American submarine had already been taken out of service less than a year after the incident, in January 1993. According to Gregory Stitz, curator of Arkansas Inland Maritime Museum, and some European sources, the costs of repairing the damaged pressure hull, along with a programmed refueling, were well beyond the planned budget. Therefore, the US Navy chose to decommission the submarine. Russian naval officers alleged that the US submarine had become a constructive total loss right after the collision. Baton Rouge was deactivated at Mare Island shipyard on 1 November 1993 and eventually scrapped at the Puget Sound Naval Shipyard in Bremerton, Washington. As for Kostroma, she was laid up on 28 March 1992 and had been fully repaired at Nerpa shipyards in Snezhnogorsk by 29 June 1992. The Russian submarine was temporarily renamed Krab, before recovering her original name in November 1996. After a huge overhaul, again at Nerpa, she returned to service in 2005.

== Political consequences ==
Kostroma at anchor, showing a crest with a large numeral 'One' on the front of her sail, a "kill marking" which commemorates the collision.

The incident produced intense embarrassment in Washington. Russia complained via diplomatic channels, and the Pentagon quickly acknowledged that a collision had occurred, contrary to an official policy at the time. A meeting between Secretary of State James Baker and Russian president Boris Yeltsin was arranged immediately. The Russian Navy accused the United States of continuing intelligence operations around Russia's home waters despite the end of the cold war. All of this prompted the US Navy to stop some specific submarine activities off Russian bases, such as tapping underwater cables or intercepting wireless communications. This measure, however, did not prevent a later incident in March 1993, when the Sturgeon-class submarine USS Grayling collided with a Delta-class submarine, K-407 Novomoskovsk off Kola Peninsula.

== See also ==
- Submarine incident off Kola Peninsula (1968)
- Submarine incident off Kola Peninsula (1993)
- Strait of Juan de Fuca laser incident
- Incident at Pristina airport
- 2021 Black Sea incident
- 2023 Black Sea drone incident
