= Submarine incident off Kola Peninsula (1968) =

1968 UK–USSR nuclear submarine collision

- Part of The Cold War and Operation Holy Stone
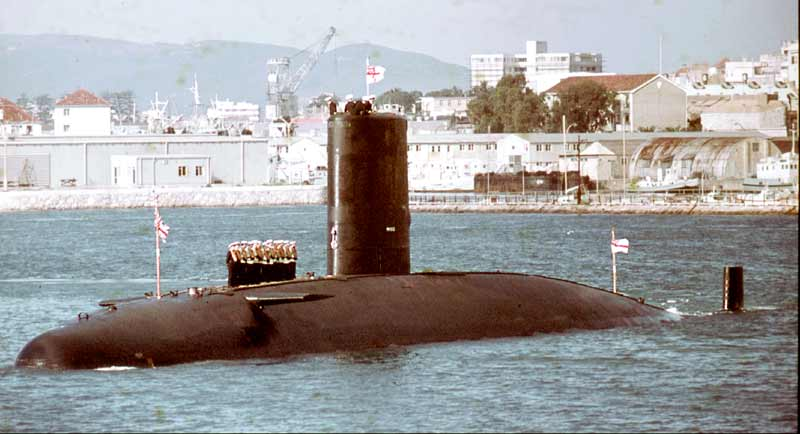
- HMS Warspite in 1970, fitted with the replacement sail originally built for HMS Churchill
Date	9 October 1968
Location	North of Kola Peninsula, somewhere between Gremikha Bay and Norwegian North Cape 70°N 36°E (approximate)
Result	Both submarines damaged

Belligerents
United Kingdom	USSR

Commanders and leaders
Captain John Bethell Hervey	Captain Vladimir Petrovich Shekhovtsov

Strength
1 Valiant-class submarine	1 Echo II-class submarine

Casualties and losses
1 nuclear submarine damaged (sail totaled); 2 injuries	1 nuclear submarine damaged (full extent unknown)
- Location within Russia

The 1968 submarine incident off Kola Peninsula was a collision between the Royal Navy nuclear submarine HMS Warspite and the Soviet Navy nuclear submarine K-131 somewhere off the shores of Kola Peninsula in the Barents Sea on 9 October 1968, at approximately 18:30 local time. At least one other source claims the impact was at approximately 22:25 local time (00:25 Zulu time). Nautical dusk at the location and date of the incident was at 19:34, making the 18:30 claim more plausible, given the claim of visual contact after the collision.

The incident occurred as the British submarine was engaged in a covert operation, studying the acoustic profile and physical construction of an Echo II-class submarine at extreme close range, trailing it from behind and below, staying in the submarine's baffles. A sudden reduction in speed of K-131 caused Warspite to collide with its aft section. The incident was the first occasion of a NATO submarine colliding with a Warsaw Pact submarine, and was not officially recorded for decades, having been reported as a collision with an iceberg.

Other incidents of Royal Navy submarines colliding with Soviet submarines include the January 1987 collision of HMS Sceptre with K-211, and the 1986 Christmas Eve collision of HMS Splendid with an unidentified vessel, most likely TK-12. The Sceptre incident was under circumstances similar to the Warspite collision, with a closely trailing British submarine ramming into a vessel which had abruptly slowed down.

== Background ==
Beginning in the late 1950s, as naval warfare technology rapidly advanced, the United States NSA initiated a program of extraordinarily risky intelligence gathering which sought to learn about Soviet naval developments. Initiated in 1958, this program was officially called "Holy Stone", variously also called "Pinnacle", "Bollard", and "Barnacle", with direct Royal Navy cooperation alongside the United States Navy. In 1969, two more Royal Navy directives were officially appended - operations "Alfa" (the shadowing of soviet submarines by British ones) and "Bravo" (clandestine intelligence collection, such as ELINT, by British submarines). Submarines of both the American and British navies would engage in extraordinarily risky deployments, lurking in vicinity of Soviet ports and naval exercises, as well as closely following Soviet submarines in order to record their acoustic signatures and visually study their construction. This intelligence gathering included direct observation of Soviet naval exercises and missile tests, recording the acoustic signatures of various vessels, and tapping undersea cables.

== Collision ==
On 9 October 1968, having penetrated beyond the Norwegian North Cape and approached in the direction of Gremikha Bay, the Royal Navy submarine HMS Warspite detected an acoustic signature of a Soviet submarine. The onboard library of acoustic signatures positively identified the submarine as an Echo II variant. Through careful, stealthy maneuvering, Warspite positioned itself in the Soviet submarine's baffles and crept closely; after 18:00 local time, the two submarines were in extreme close proximity, at a depth of some 200 ft (61 m), with Warspite slightly below the Echo II. The proximity was close enough to visually study the Soviet submarine's construction. At approximately 18:30 local time, the Echo II cut power to one of its two screws, which simultaneously reduced its noise and slowed down its speed. Sonar operator Jumper Colling was aware of the nature of the change in the acoustic signature, but did not have time to warn the command room; there, the change was interpreted as a routine maneuver by the Echo II to clear her baffles. Instead of maintaining course and slowing down, Warspite attempted a turn maneuver, so as to remain in the baffles of what they perceived to be a turning submarine. Moments later, its sail collided with the aft and underside of the Echo II. Both submarines heeled over to starboard, instruments on Warspite registering a peak tilt of 74 degrees; equipment and crewmen were violently thrown. There was a disorienting cacophony of alarms and flashing lights; the planesman at the pilot's controls in the control room froze in a panic, possibly falling momentarily unconscious; able seaman Colin Paton later relieved him at the controls, having to lightly punch him in order to force him to let go. The spinning screw of the Echo II swiped along the thin fairing of the other submarine's sail, shredding the metal and various subsystems therein. In a frantic effort to stabilize the vessel, a secondary collision took place, the submarine again crashing her sail into K-131's underside. The second collision caused a tilt of 67 degrees. The Core A Rolls-Royce PWR1 reactor, which powered Warspite, was not designed to operate if tilted to the side; failsafe systems would cause it to go into emergency shutdown. Engineer officer lieutenant commander Frank Turvey was able to quickly battleshort the shutdown procedure from the reactor console in the maneuvering room; this action may have had far-ranging implications, allowing the submarine to later escape from the intensive hunt for it, initiated by the soviet navy.

Lieutenant commander Tim Hale ordered the vessel to emergency-surface and blow ballast. K-131, likewise, blew ballast and surfaced. Captain John Hervey insisted on using the search periscope to observe the surroundings, concerned about the possible presence of Soviet warships. Hale unsuccessfully tried to stop him, out of concern that the watertight joints of the periscope were compromised. The periscope was slightly canted due to damage to the sail, and the bundle of armored cables at its bottom would no longer go back into the periscope well below; later, a decision was made to have it remain fully extended until Warspite reached a dockyard. Through the periscope, K-131 was visible, likewise with its periscope raised, scrutinizing the NATO submarine. Captain Hervey ordered the crew to prepare to assist the Soviet submarine with medical casualties and damage control; however, the radio room intercepted unencrypted transmissions from the other submarine, with Russian-speaking interpreters reporting that there were no fatalities and buoyancy was not compromised. Thereby, the decision was made to escape the scene. According to a personal account by Ian Wragg, someone likened the view on the surface as akin to Blackpool Illuminations, suggesting that search lights on numerous vessels were visible. On board K-131, the exit hatch had its release mechanism jammed by the impact; it took several minutes of beating with a sledgehammer to force the hatch to release. By the time this was done, Warspite had dived again and was escaping at a speed of approximately 7 knots (13 km/h). K-131 did not pursue.

=== Aftermath ===
The submarine which was scheduled to relieve Warspite was USS Gato, which arrived to encounter a flurry of Soviet naval activity. The event was described as a "treasure trove" of information, as vessels were haphazardly communicating in clear language, without ciphers. In 1969, Gato would be involved in a collision as well; the Soviet submarine K-19 collided with Gato head-on. The circumstances of the Gato collision may have been retaliatory in nature.

HMS Warspite set course for Faslane, limited to a speed of approximately 16 knots (30 km/h) on the surface; while submerged, above 7 knots, she would tend to roll to the side due to uneven drag on the mangled sail. Beyond Norway, it had a rendezvous with the frigate HMS Dundas, which escorted the submarine as it was diverted to a sheltered anchorage near Lerwick in the Shetland Islands, where a team of shipwrights conducted cosmetic repairs to the submarine's sail. After cosmetic repairs were performed, Warspite headed to Barrow and was escorted to a dockyard, where complete repairs would be performed. The sail of Warspite was completely replaced, with the unit originally manufactured by VSEL for HMS Churchill, at the time under construction. In this way, the post-repair Warspite would actually become a slightly hybrid design. Repairs took 28 days. For reasons unclear, the media somehow learned that the submarine was involved in a collision; the official cover story was that Warspite had collided with an iceberg, as published in a 19 October 1968 issue of The Times.

K-131 was escorted and most likely towed to a repair facility, presumably located in Severomorsk, Gremikha, or Polyarny. One source, which positively identifies the involved Echo II as K-131, claims that damage was "minor". Another source had claimed that a harbour official remarked that the aft external hull had a hole in it "large enough for a three-ton truck to drive through". Bits of metal debris, together with shards of green and red glass, trapped inside the caved-in section of the outer hull, led the soviet navy to conclude that the collision was with a NATO submarine. At the time, it was alleged that a British diesel submarine had pulled into Norway with a damaged sail; an American submarine was also suspected.

Both the USSR and the United Kingdom covered up the collision in its aftermath, resulting in the details being unknown for decades. Officially, Royal Navy authorities furnished details regarding the collision which claimed that it involved an iceberg, occurred on 19 October 1968, and was located in the Greenland Sea, at approximately 75°N 30°E. The British side of the story has been documented in multiple books and articles, whereas the Soviet side remains effectively unknown beyond some basic facts. Whereas events like the 1989 reactor accident on K-131 (by then renamed K-192) are well-documented, the 1968 collision has remained largely unknown.

=== Consequences ===
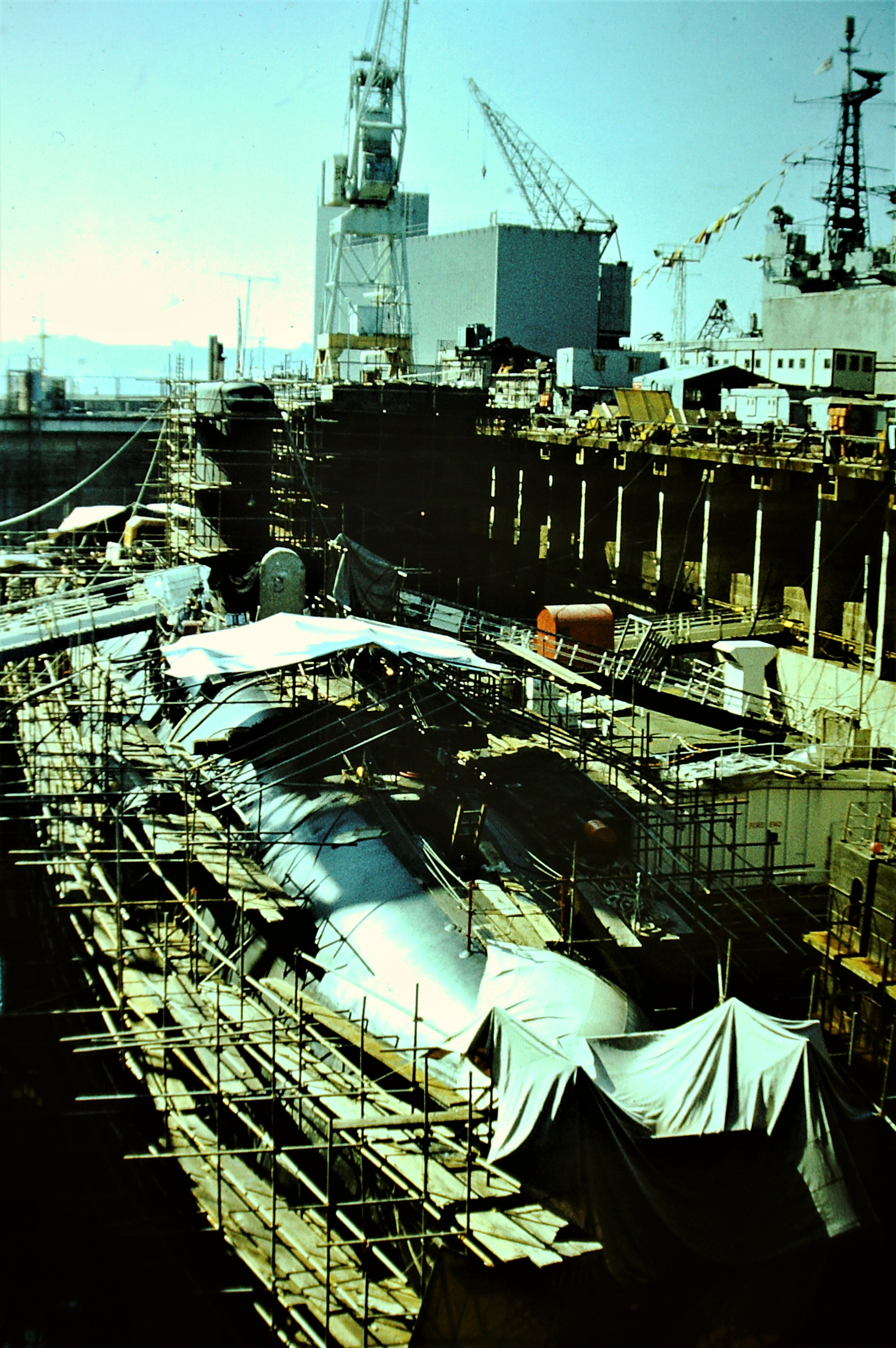
HMS Warspite undergoing refit work at HMNB Devonport in 1977. The torpedo forward hatch can be seen with a ladder extending from it.

The sail of Warspite was deemed a total loss, resulting in its replacement; aside from structural damage, a chaotic mess of power and data cables were left trailing outboard, various equipment having been destroyed. The main conning tower hatch was rendered unusable by structural deformation; instead, the torpedo forward hatch was used. Elsewhere, the damage was relatively minor.

Multiple seamen on board Warspite sustained injuries from the collision, most of them minor. Some of the more serious were the instances of junior rating Ian Wragg, who was in the process of climbing a ladder while carrying a cup of tea up to the command room, and junior rating Graham Salmon, who was asleep in a bunk. Both men would be hurled from their positions, with Graham Salmon falling some 3.7 metres (12 ft) and suffering a fractured ankle and a back injury. Two seamen would transfer out of Warspite. According to Commander Sandy Woodward, who took over command in 1969, the crew was reportedly highly unnerved by the collision. Some members were tense and apprehensive during underwater maneuvers; this would later be ameliorated by exposure therapy, through maneuver exercises such as an Angles and Dangles course.

Captain John Hervey would subsequently face a court-martial. However, he was not found to be at fault, and thereafter in 1970 was awarded the Order of the British Empire for his service aboard Warspite.

Almost nothing is known about the extent of the damage to K-131, aside from the fact that its external hull was penetrated and the sole spinning screw diced the sail of Warspite, clearly taking damage in the process. The observation that the hatch of K-131 became jammed suggests that the collision caused a considerable mechanical shock. Captain V. P. Shekhovtsov was replaced by Captain V. I. Dratzevich.

== See also ==
- Submarine incident off Kola Peninsula (1993) - 1993 submarine collision in the same general vicinity
