= Submarine incident off Kola Peninsula (1993) =

1993 US–Russia nuclear submarine collision

- Part of Operation Holy Stone
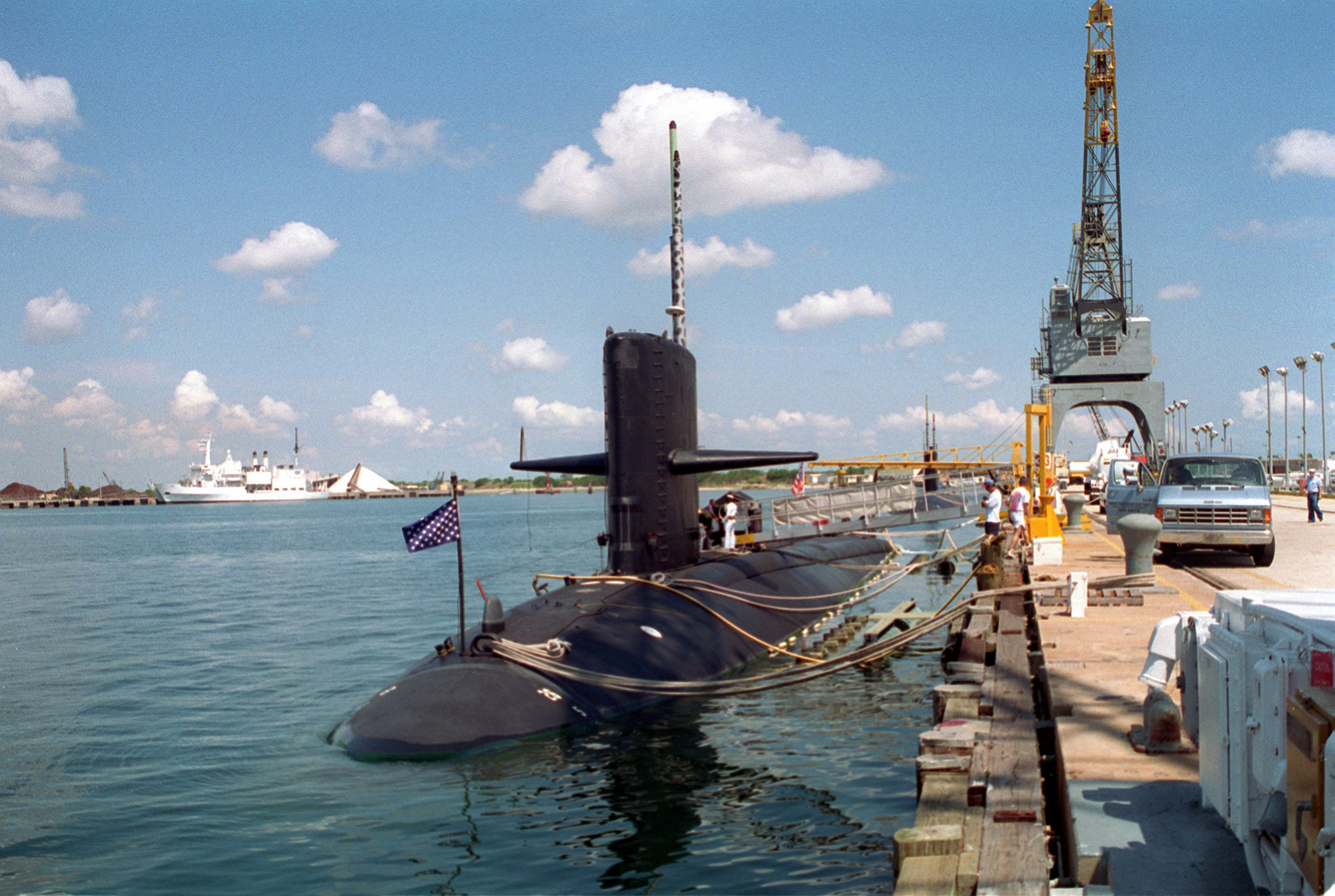
- USS Grayling moored at Port Canaveral, Florida, a few months after the incident
| Date | 20 March 1993 |
| Location | North of Murmansk, Russia 70°30′10.5″N 32°56′52.8″E |
| Result | US Navy surveillance on Russian naval bases restricted |

Belligerents
| United States | Russian Federation |

Commanders and leaders
| Cdr. Richard Self | Cdr. Andrei Bulgarkov |

Strength
| 1 Sturgeon-class submarine | 1 Delta IV-class submarine |

Casualties and losses
| 1 nuclear submarine lightly damaged | 1 nuclear submarine lightly damaged |
- Location within Russia

The 1993 submarine Incident off Kola Peninsula was a collision between the US Navy nuclear attack submarine USS Grayling and the Russian Navy nuclear ballistic missile submarine K-407 Novomoskovsk some 150 km (90 mi) north of the Russian naval base of Severomorsk, on 20 March 1993. The incident took place when the American submarine, who was trailing her Russian counterpart, lost track of Novomoskovsk. At the time that Grayling reacquired the other submarine, the short distance of only half a mile made the collision unavoidable. The incident happened just a week before the first summit between American president Bill Clinton and the president of the Russian Federation, Boris Yeltsin.

== Previous incident ==
Despite the end of the Cold War and 1991 fall of the Soviet Union, the United States government tasked the US Navy to continue to keep a close watch on the main bases of Russian nuclear submarines to monitor developments, especially those related to strategic assets that remained under Russian control. This kind of submarine surveillance was officially known as "Operation Holy Stone" and "Operation Pinnacle" or "Bollard" in the submariners' jargon. The intelligence-gathering included the tapping of Soviet submarine communication cables, the recording of the pattern of noises from Soviet submarines, and the observation of submarine-launched ballistic missile tests.

On 11 February 1992, the American attack submarine USS Baton Rouge collided with the Russian Navy nuclear submarine B-276 Kostroma off Severomorsk. The mission of Baton Rouge was reportedly the recovery or delivery of intelligence-monitoring devices on the seabed. The American press claimed that the submarine was checking wireless traffic between Russian bases, but the Russians and independent sources asserted that the two units were engaged in a 'cat-and-mouse game'.

According to some sources, Baton Rouge was written off for the high costs of repairing the damaged pressure hull, along with a programmed refueling. This was not unusual; as part of post-Cold War restructuring, the U.S. Navy decommissioned 14 of the first 31 ships in the Los Angeles class instead of refueling them, most at between 17 and 19 years of service.

== The collision ==
Novomoskovsk, commanded by Captain First Rank Andrei Bulgarkov, was performing combat training tasks at a site 105 nautical miles (194 km) north of Murmansk. Having reached the northern border of the designated area, she turned back, making between 16 knots (30 km/h) to 18 knots (33 km/h). 25 minutes later, while submerged at 74 meters, the crew of Novomoskovsk felt an impact, then heard screeching noises. Immediately after, their sonar detected noises of a foreign submarine close by. Before clearing the area, Grayling checked that the Russian submarine had not sustained serious damage.

An investigation revealed that Grayling had been tracking the Russian submarine bearing between 155 and 165 degrees and from distances of between 11–13 kilometres (5.9–7.0 nmi). Grayling lost contact with Novomoskovsk when the Russian submarine changed course to 180 degrees. To reacquire the target, Grayling sped to the location of contact loss at 8–15 knots (15–28 km/h).

The breaking waves created in the shallow waters of the Barents Sea generate background signals, so that when two submarines approach one another head-on, each detects the other when the distance between the two vessels is just a couple of hundred meters. Grayling's passive sonar detected Novomoskovsk at a distance of about a kilometer (0.54 nautical mile). With the distance closing and Grayling's combat information center still trying to decide on the best way of avoiding a collision, Grayling's commanding officer, Commander Richard Self, tried to change course and to surface, but the attempts were thwarted by Grayling's momentum. Grayling collided with the upper structure of Novomoskovsk, which suffered a large scratch on her starboard bow. The American submarine limped away also with minor damage. The American submarine was repaired and remained in service until her decommissioning in 1997. Novomoskovsk also returned to service, and after a major upgrade was expected to stay in the Russian Navy until 2020. However, she is still in service as of 2024.

== Political consequences ==
The second clash between American and Russian submarines in a year unleashed a flurry of angry reactions, both inside the Clinton administration and in Yeltsin's Russia. The news that the US Navy was still keeping a close watch on Russia's ports and bases came barely a week before a scheduled summit between the presidents of both countries. At that time, the US government was trying to improve relationships with Russia, especially by supporting Yeltsin's reforms. During the meeting, which took place in Canada, Clinton promised that he would conduct a review not only of the incident itself, but of the policies "of which the incident happened to be an unintended part."

Clinton's statement caused concern in the US Navy, but after a briefing for top officials, among them the new national security adviser, Anthony Lake, the submarine force got the green light to continue its activities in the Barents Sea, although at a greatly reduced pace. The result was a major effort to restrict the operational procedures and improve the training of submarine commanding officers.

== See also ==
- Submarine incident off Kola Peninsula (1968)
- Submarine incident off Kildin Island
- Strait of Juan de Fuca laser incident
- Incident at Pristina airport
- 2021 Black Sea incident
- 2023 Black Sea drone incident
- HMS Vanguard and Le Triomphant submarine collision
