= S104 =

S104 may refer to:

- County Route S104, a county route in Bergen County, New Jersey
- HMS Sceptre (S104), a 1976 British Swiftsure-class submarine
