= Russian submarine Nizhny Novgorod =

- Project 945A (Sierra II) Class submarine profile

History

Russia
- Name: B-534 Nizhny Novgorod
- Ordered: 1984
- Builder: Krasnoye Sormovo Factory No. 112
- Laid down: 1986
- Launched: 1989
- Commissioned: 1990
- Status: Active

General characteristics
- Class & type: Sierra-class submarine
- Displacement: 7,600 tons (surfaced); 9,100 tons (submerged)
- Length: 107 m (351 ft 1 in)
- Beam: 14.2 m (46 ft 7 in)
- Propulsion: 1 × PWR, 190 MW; 2 × 1002 hp emergency motors; 1 shaft, 2 spinners
- Speed: 10 knots (19 km/h; 12 mph) (surfaced); 32 knots (59 km/h; 37 mph) (submerged)
- Range: Unlimited, except by food supplies
- Complement: 61 (31 officers, 28–30 crew)
- Armament: 6 × 530 mm (21 in) torpedo tubes; SS-N-21 Sampson SLCM with 200 kt nuclear warhead; SS-N-15 Starfish anti submarine weapon: 200 kt depth charge or 90 kg HE Type 40 torpedo; SS-N-16 Stallion, 200 kt depth charge or 90 kg HE Type 40 torpedo; Minelaying configuration: 42 mines instead of torpedoes

Service record
- Part of: Russian Northern Fleet

Russian Submarine B-534 Nizhny Novgorod (Russian: Ни́жний Но́вгород, named after the city Nizhny Novgorod) is a Russian Sierra II-class Submarine named after the Russian city with the same name founded by Prince George II of Vladimir. It is one of two ships of its subclass.

== Construction ==
The Russian Navy first ordered the ship and entered B-534 into its list of ships on 3 March 1984 with the formation and training of the crew beginning in May of that year. The ship herself was laid down on 15 February 1986 in Gorky, while her crew was integrated into the 104th Submarine Squadron.

She was launched on the 8 July 1989 and transited to Severodvinsk between 10 August and 1 September of that year along the Volga River and White-Sea Baltic Canal. The crew were onboarded in October after returning at the Naval Training Center, and the boat underwent a fitting out process until June 1990 when preparations were made for sea trials.

On 5 June 1990, the ship undertook the first sortie, and two days later conducted its first dive. Sea trials continued until late December, and the ship launched her first missile on 8 October, first torpedo the next day and first mine-laying exercise the day after. The ship was granted an acceptance certificate on 26 December 1990 and the naval flag was officially raised on 27 December.

== Operational history ==
She undertook a voyage to her homeport in Zapadnya Litsa Bay and arrived on 11 January, after which she was interned and underwent additional work to adjust the ship's systems and mechanisms at Nerpa Shipyard. Her crew was part of the 6th Submarine Division of the 1st Submarine Fleet from march onwards.

The submarine underwent a mid-life refit and refueling (of its nuclear reactor) in 2008, to ensure it was updated and combat capable. In 2011, the submarine was stationed near Ara Gruba, as part of the Russian Northern Fleet alongside her sistership, K-336 Pskov. In 2019, both Nizhny Novgorod and her sole sistership took part in large scale naval exercises.

The ship went in for repairs and modernisation in 2024 at Nerpa, and is still officially in service as of 2025 though there are doubts of its operational condition. It is assigned to the 7th Submarine Division, based out of Vidyayevo.

== See also ==
- Russian Submarine Pskov
