= K211 =

K211 or K-211 may refer to:

- K-211 (Kansas highway), a state highway in Kansas
- Russian submarine Petropavlovsk-Kamchatskiy (K-211), a Russian submarine
- Violin Concerto No. 2 (Mozart) in D major, K.211
