= Russian submarine Kostroma =

Russian Sierra class submarine

History

Soviet Union, Russia
- Name: K-276 Crab
- Builder: Gorky, later towed to Severodvinsk for completion
- Launched: July 1986
- Commissioned: September 1987
- Renamed: B-276 Kostroma
- Status: Reported in reserve

General characteristics
- Class & type: Sierra-class submarine
- Displacement: 7,600 tons (surfaced); 9,100 tons (submerged)
- Length: 107 m (351 ft)
- Beam: 14.2 m (47 ft)
- Propulsion: 1 × PWR, 190 MW; 2 × 1002 hp emergency motors; 1 shaft, 2 spinners
- Speed: 10 knots (18.5 km/h; 11.5 mph) (surfaced); 32 knots (59.3 km/h; 36.8 mph) (submerged)
- Range: Unlimited, except by food supplies
- Complement: 61
- Armament: 4 × 650 mm (26 in) torpedo tubes; 4 × 530 mm (21 in) torpedo tubes; SS-N-21 Sampson SLCM with 200 kt nuclear warhead; SS-N-15 Starfish anti submarine weapon: 200 kt depth charge or 90 kg HE Type 40 torpedo; SS-N-16 Stallion, 200 kt depth charge or 90 kg HE Type 40 torpedo; Minelaying configuration: 42 mines instead of torpedoes

B-276 Kostroma is a Russian Sierra-class submarine. She was launched in 1986, commissioned in 1987, and named K-276 Crab until 1992. Kostroma was built at Gorky and later towed to Severodvinsk for completion. She is part of the Russian Northern Fleet.

On 11 February 1992, Kostroma - then still named K-276 Crab - while undergoing combat training in the Barents Sea, collided with USS Baton Rouge (some sources state it was K-239 Carp that collided with Baton Rouge). Baton Rouge was damaged (as was Crab) and was eventually deactivated in 1993.

K-276 damaged the cabin fencing and the fairing of the hydroacoustic complex (GAK). The renovation was completed by June of the same year and the submarine re-entered the 7th Submarine Division of the Northern Fleet. SSN-689 "Baton Rouge" was handed over for recycling two years later, having ceased to exist in 1997.

On the K-276 wheelhouse, the crew drew the number "1", bordered with a star, as Soviet submariners did during the Great Patriotic War, noting the number of their victories. Foreign sources believed that the Baton Rouge collided with the K-239, another submarine of the same design as the K-276. There is a version that the collision was initiated by the Kostroma crew deliberately in order to get rid of the pursuit of an American submarine.

On 14 May 2014, it became known about the conclusion of a contract between the Ministry of Defense of the Russian Federation and the enterprise TsS "Zvyozdochka" for the modernization of the Sierra I in Severodvinsk. The modernization will allow the submarine to be in service for about 10 more years. The timing of the repair work is not yet known.

However, in March 2015, it became known that the repair of the boats of Sierra I class had been suspended.

As of 2020, B-276 is in reserve in Vizdyaevo as part of 7º Submarine Division.

== See also ==
- Submarine incident off Kildin Island
