= 2023 Black Sea drone incident =

Russian–US military interaction

- Part of the Russo-Ukrainian war
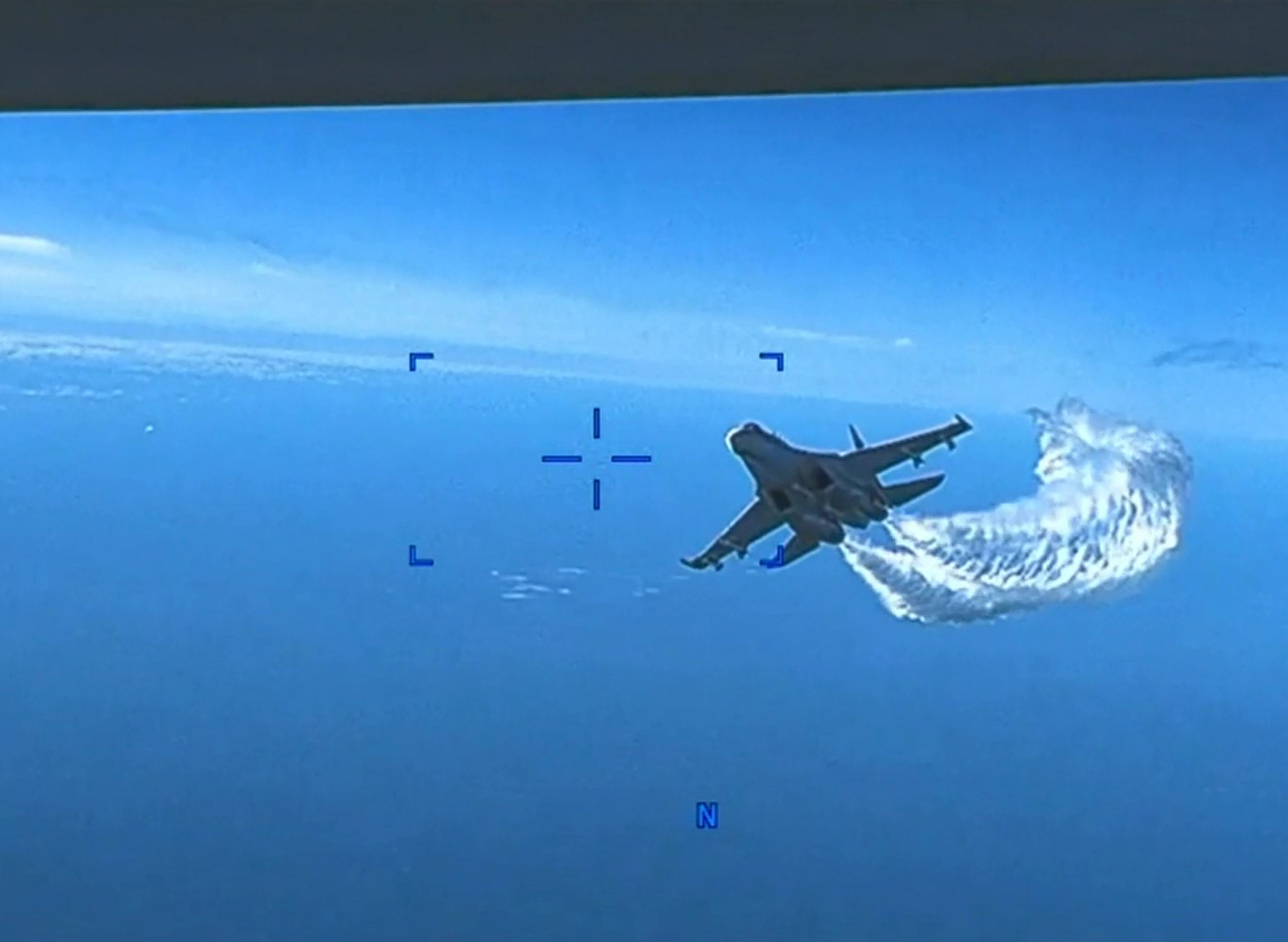
- A Su-27 approaching the drone on the footage released by the US
Date	14 March 2023
Location	Black Sea, near Crimea
Result	Drone propeller disabled, leading to its fall to the sea (according to the Pentagon)

Belligerents
Russia	United States

Strength
2 Su-27 fighter jets	1 MQ-9 Reaper drone

Casualties and losses
None	One drone lost

On the morning of 14 March 2023, a Russian Su-27 fighter jet intercepted and damaged an American MQ-9 Reaper drone, causing it to crash into the Black Sea. This became the first direct contact between the Russian and United States air forces since the Cold War.

The US Air Force called this "reckless, environmentally unsound and unprofessional". The Russian Defense Ministry said no aircraft touched and no weapons were used, though it rewarded pilots with medals for "preventing" an American drone from "violating Russia's temporary airspace".

== Background ==
On the early morning of 14 March 2023, an MQ-9 Reaper drone belonging to the United States Air Force departed from a base in Romania, likely the Romanian Air Force 71st Air Base located in Câmpia Turzii. The drone was scheduled to conduct a routine reconnaissance mission over the Black Sea when it was intercepted by two Russian fighter jets.

This event occurred amidst heightened tensions between Russia and the United States, with the Biden administration imposing sanctions and working to isolate Russia in response to the Russo-Ukrainian war. The US Defense Department's spokesman, Brigadier General Pat Ryder, remarked that intercepts of aircraft are not uncommon and that the Russian aircraft were likely conducting a routine check of the situation.

According to the Swedish flight tracking service Flightradar24 the MQ-9 Reaper is generally flown without an active ADS-B transponder.

== Incident ==
Camera footage from the drone during the incident

United States European Command said that the US MQ-9 Reaper drone was flying over international waters in the Black Sea in the presence of two Russian aircraft when one of the aircraft flew in front of the drone and dumped fuel on top of it. Then one of the planes damaged the drone's propeller, forcing it to ditch in the Black Sea. The incident happened at about 7:03 am local time. According to a map released by the US Air Force the collision and subsequent crash took place in the Black Sea to the southwest of Crimea. On several occasions before the collision, Russian fighters dumped fuel on the MQ-9—possibly in an attempt to blind or damage it—and flew in front of the drone in unsafe maneuvers, the US military said.

Ryder said the drone was "well away" from Ukrainian territory, but he did not give an exact location. Ukraine has said that it crashed off Snake Island; General Mark Milley stated that the drone crashed in an area of the Black Sea that was as deep as 1,500 meters (5,000 ft), making recovery difficult and implying that the location was not anywhere near Snake Island. After its propeller was damaged, the drone flew as a glider while descending over the Black Sea, crashing in international waters southwest of Crimea. While in flight, the drone's software was wiped to avoid capture.

Ryder declined to speak about US efforts to retrieve the aircraft but noted that Russia had not recovered it. A day later, John Kirby said it may never be recovered, while Russian Security Council secretary Nikolai Patrushev stated that Russia would attempt to recover the craft. Recovery by the US is complicated not just by the depth of the waters but also by the lack of naval assets in the region. By the night (EDT) of 15 March 2023, unnamed US officials told ABC News that Russian ships had arrived at the crash site and may have likely picked up pieces of the wreckage. John Kirby did not confirm this, but said that the US had "made it impossible for them to be able to glean anything of intelligence value off the remnants of that drone".

According to US officials, the order to harass the drone was given by the Russian Ministry of Defense, and the pilots were not taking rogue action.

== Reactions ==
=== US ===
According to National Security Council communications coordinator John Kirby, President Joe Biden was briefed on the incident by National Security Adviser Jake Sullivan on the morning of March 14. US Army General Christopher Cavoli, NATO's Supreme Allied Commander Europe, briefed NATO allies on the incident. The downing of the drone was strongly condemned by the White House and the Pentagon, who warned of the risk of escalation.

The Russian ambassador to the United States was summoned to the Department of State in connection with the incident. The US released video of the incident supporting their claim that fuel was dumped onto the drone and that its propeller was damaged.

=== Russia ===
The Russian Defence Ministry said the US drone was flying with its transponders off and that its fighter jets did not make contact with the drone, claiming instead that the drone crashed due to "harsh maneuvering". "The Russian fighters did not use their airborne weapons, did not make contact with the drone, and returned safely to their home airfield", the defense ministry said.

Russian ambassador to the United States Anatoly Antonov said, "We view this incident as a provocation" after being summoned to a meeting with State Department officials, according to Reuters.

On 17 March, Russian Defence Minister Sergei Shoigu presented the Russian fighter pilots involved in the incident with state awards.

== See also ==
- 2021 Black Sea incident – Incident between Russia and the United Kingdom in the Black Sea on 23 June 2021
- Air-to-air combat losses between the Soviet Union and the United States
- Hainan Island incident – 2001 aviation accident between aircraft of the US and China
- Incident at Pristina airport – 1999 confrontation between Russian and NATO forces
- 2025 Russian drone incursion into Poland
- Submarine incident off Kildin Island – 1992 US–Russia nuclear submarine collision
- Submarine incident off Kola Peninsula – 1993 US–Russia nuclear submarine collision
