= USS Grayling (SSN-646) =

Submarine of the United States

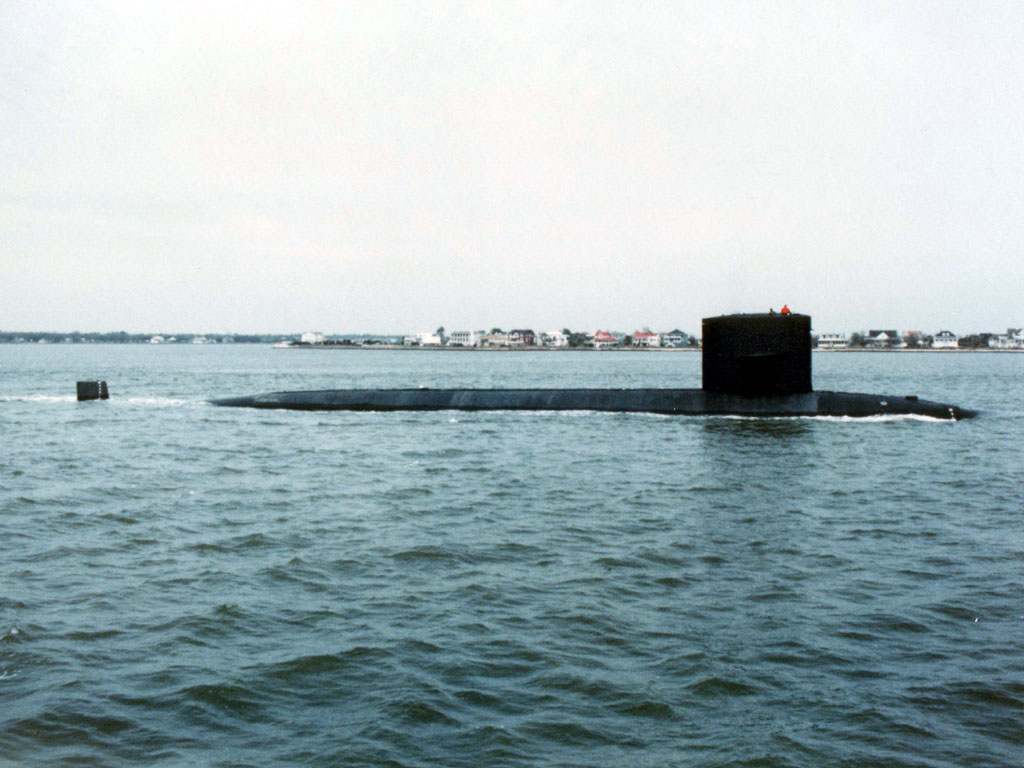
- USS Grayling (SSN-646)

History

United States
- Name: Grayling
- Namesake: The grayling, a fresh water game fish closely related to the trout
- Awarded: 5 September 1962
- Builder: Portsmouth Naval Shipyard, Kittery, Maine
- Laid down: 12 May 1964
- Launched: 22 June 1967
- Sponsored by: Miss Lori Brinker
- Commissioned: 11 October 1969
- Decommissioned: 18 July 1997
- Stricken: 18 July 1997
- Identification: Hull number: SSN-646
- Fate: Scrapping via Ship and Submarine Recycling Program completed 31 March 1998
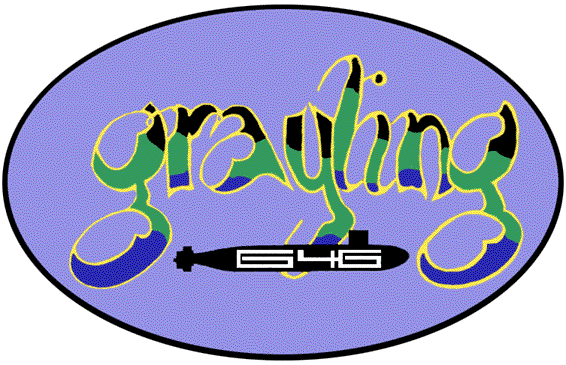
- Badge

General characteristics
- Class & type: Sturgeon-class attack submarine
- Displacement: 3,956 long tons (4,019 t) light; 4,252 long tons (4,320 t) full; 296 long tons (301 t) dead
- Length: 289 ft (88 m)
- Beam: 32 ft (9.8 m)
- Draft: 29 ft (8.8 m)
- Installed power: 15,000 shp (11 MW)
- Propulsion: One S5W nuclear reactor, two steam turbines, one screw
- Speed: 16 knots (30 km/h; 18 mph) standard
- Test depth: 1,300 ft (400 m)
- Complement: 109 (14 officers, 95 enlisted men)
- Armament: 4 × 21-inch (533 mm) torpedo tubes

USS Grayling (SSN-646), a Sturgeon-class attack submarine, was the fifth ship of the United States Navy to be named for the grayling. Her keel was laid down in 1964, and she was launched just over three years later, and commissioned in 1969. She was involved in the submarine incident off Kola Peninsula on 20 March 1993, when she collided with the Russian Navy submarine Novomoskovsk. She was decommissioned in 1997, and disposed of a year later.

== Construction and commissioning ==
The contract to build Grayling was awarded on 5 September 1962 and her keel was laid down at the Portsmouth Naval Shipyard at Kittery, Maine, on 12 May 1964. She was launched on 22 June 1967, sponsored by Miss Lori Brinker, the daughter of Lieutenant Commander Robert Brinker, who was commanding officer of the previous Grayling (SS-209) when she was lost with all hands in September 1943 during World War II. Grayling (SSN-646) was commissioned on 11 October 1969.

== Service history ==
=== Collision with Russian submarine, 1993 ===
On 20 March 1993, Grayling collided with the Russian Navy submarine Novomoskovsk, a Delfin-class (NATO reporting name Delta IV-class) ballistic missile submarine north of Murmansk. Grayling had been tracking the Russian unit when the collision happened. The American submarine collided with the starboard bow of Novomoskovsk; neither submarine sustained serious damage.

=== 1993–1997 ===
After the March 1993 collision with the Russian ballistic-missile submarine Russian submarine NovomoskovskK-407 Novomoskovsk, Grayling remained in service until the end of her career. A U.S. Navy photograph dated 25 July 1993 shows the submarine moored at Port Canaveral, Florida, several months after the incident.

In June 1995 Grayling was on Training and Readiness exercise and left to head straight to Panama. It was 150 yds off the Natalys stern the moment it left Panama see article below

https://www.latimes.com/archives/la-xpm-1995-08-19-mn-36705-story.html

In June 1996, Grayling participated in Exercise TAPON 96, a nine-day allied naval exercise held in the Alboran Sea, the Gulf of Cádiz and the eastern Atlantic Ocean. The exercise emphasized procedures and tactics for maritime choke-point control. Other participating units included the U.S. Navy destroyer USS Conolly, the Spanish aircraft carrier SPS Príncipe de Asturias, the Spanish frigates SPS Baleares, SPS Santa María and SPS Numancia, the Spanish submarine SPS Delfín, and the Greek destroyer Formion.

== Decommissioning and disposal ==
Grayling was deactivated on 1 March 1997, placed in commission in reserve a week later as she entered the Ship and Submarine Recycling Program, then decommissioned and stricken from the Naval Vessel Register on 18 July 1997. Her scrapping via the U.S. Navy's Ship and Submarine Recycling Program at Puget Sound Naval Shipyard at Bremerton, Washington, was completed on 31 March 1998.

== Commemoration ==
Grayling's sail is now a memorial on the grounds of Portsmouth Naval Shipyard at Kittery, Maine, and her anchor and chain are on display as a memorial at The American Legion Post 106 in downtown Grayling, Michigan.

== See also ==
- Submarine incident off Kildin island
