= 2021 Black Sea incident =

Incident between Russia and the United Kingdom in the Black Sea on 23 June 2021

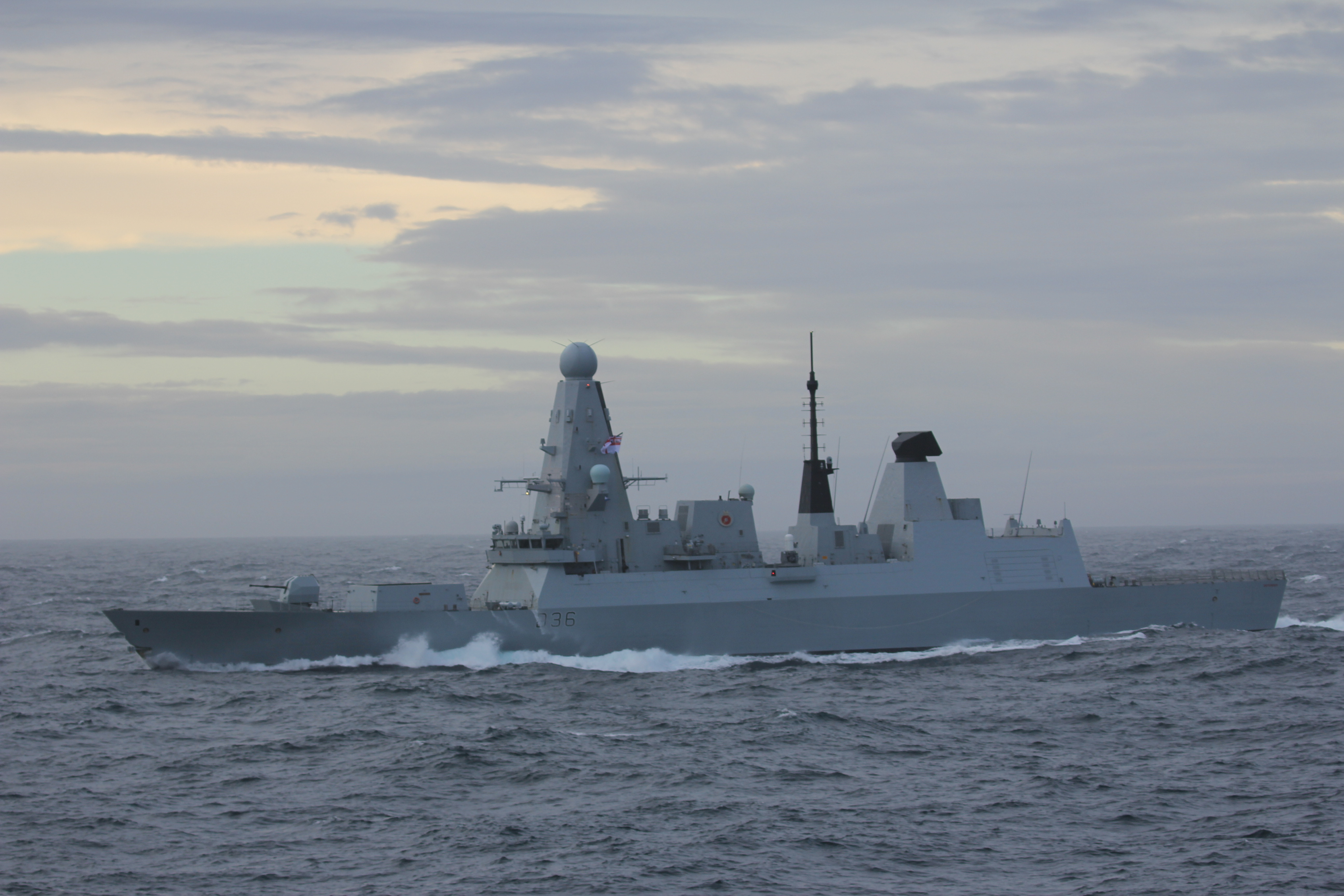
- HMS Defender at sea in October 2020
Date	23 June 2021
Location	Black Sea

Belligerents
Russia; Russian Navy; Federal Security Service; FSB Border Service of Russia; Coast Guard	United Kingdom: Royal Navy; Kingdom of the Netherlands: Royal Netherlands Navy

Commanders and leaders
Vladimir Putin Admiral Nikolai Yevmenov	(United Kingdom) Boris Johnson: (United Kingdom) Commander Vince Owen; Vice-Admiral René Tas, Commander

Strength
2 patrol boats	HMS Defender

The 2021 Black Sea incident was a diplomatic incident between Russia and the United Kingdom involving the British destroyer HMS Defender while it transited from Odesa, Ukraine, to Batumi, Georgia. The Minister of Defence of Russia stated that a patrol boat fired warning shots, while a Su-24 aircraft dropped bombs in the vicinity of the British vessel. Defender reached Batumi three days later.

== Background ==
In 2014, Russia annexed the Crimean Peninsula. The British government does not recognise the annexation of Crimea.

=== Ukraine–United Kingdom naval agreement ===
On 21 June 2021, the United Kingdom and Ukraine signed a naval cooperation agreement onboard HMS Defender, whilst in port at Odesa, Ukraine. Under the terms of the agreement, the United Kingdom would transfer two refurbished Sandown-class minehunters to Ukraine and produce eight small missile warships for the country. The United Kingdom would also construct a new naval base on the Black Sea as the primary fleet base for the Ukrainian Navy and a base on the Sea of Azov. The agreement also provided for the sale of missiles to Ukraine, and for training and support for these.

== HMS Defender ==
On 23 June 2021, the United Kingdom's HMS Defender undertook a "freedom of navigation patrol" through the disputed waters around the Crimean Peninsula.

In an account partially contradicted by the UK government, the Ministry of Defence of the Russian Federation and border guards said they fired warning shots from coast guard patrol ships and dropped bombs from a Sukhoi Su-24 attack aircraft in the path of Defender after, according to the Russian Defence Ministry, it had allegedly strayed for about 20 minutes as far as 3 kilometres (1.9 mi) into waters off the coast of Crimea, which Russia annexed in 2014 in a move mostly unrecognised internationally. The UK military denied any warning shots were fired and said the ship was in innocent passage in Ukraine's territorial sea, later clarifying that heavy guns were fired three miles astern and could not be considered to be warning shots. BBC defence correspondent Jonathan Beale on board the vessel confirmed that the ship had gone to action stations prior to the transit; the crew put on flash protection in case of live fire; they were warned on the radio that the Russians would fire, and heard some firing in the distance. The Russian Ministry of Defence and the Russian Coastguard released two videos, one of them allegedly taken from a Russian fighter and the other from a patrol boat, showing that shots were actually fired near HMS Defender. This would be the first time that Russian forces had fired on a British warship since the Allied intervention in Russia in 1919. HMS Defender arrived in Batumi on 26 June.

On 27 June, secret documents relating to the passage of HMS Defender through Ukraine's territorial waters were discovered at a bus stop in Kent. These documents revealed that the Royal Navy considered different hypothetical reactions from Russia in response to the ship's passage and was prepared for the possibility that Russia might respond in an aggressive manner. The documents showed the passage was a calculated decision by the British government to make a show of support for Ukraine. The senior civil servant who lost the files had his security clearance suspended. He had been due to become a United Kingdom ambassador to NATO.

== HNLMS Evertsen ==
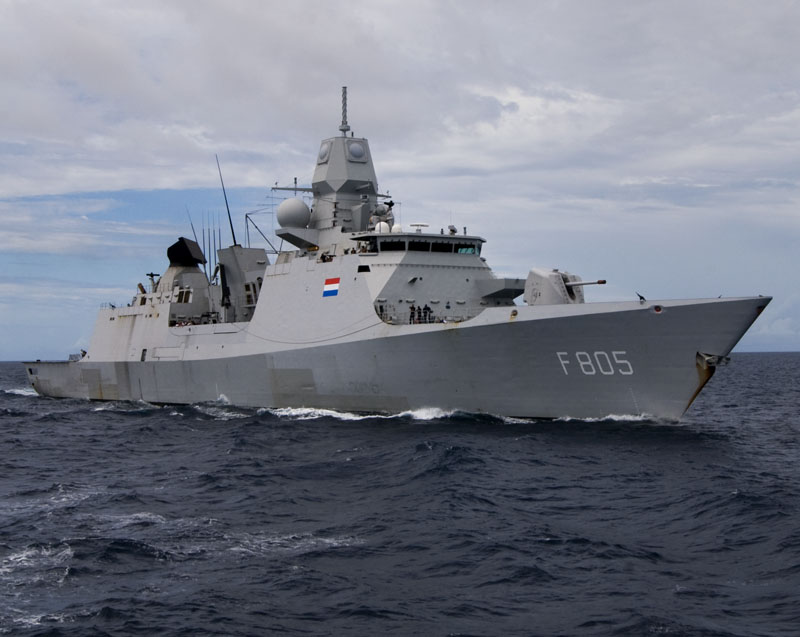
HNLMS Evertsen at sea in April 2008

From 15:30 to 20:30 on 24 June, the Russian Air Force conducted a series of "mock attacks" on the Dutch frigate HNLMS Evertsen that had been sailing in the Black Sea with HMS Defender. Russian Foreign Ministry spokesperson Maria Zakharova accused the frigate of "dangerous manoeuvring" that was a "deliberate provocation". In response, the British Ministry of Defence stated that "freedom of navigation is a fundamental right exercised by all nations".

== Aftermath ==
British Prime Minister Boris Johnson defended the decision to conduct the patrol as "entirely right". Deputy Russian Foreign Minister Sergei Ryabkov warned that Russia would drop bombs "not only in its path, but also on target" if British vessels were involved in future incidents. Russian President Vladimir Putin accused the United Kingdom of "deliberate provocation" and stated that the United States sent a plane to monitor the Russian response.

== See also ==
- 1986 Black Sea incident
- 1988 Black Sea bumping incident
- Submarine incident off Kildin Island
- Submarine incident off Kola Peninsula
- 2003 Tuzla Island conflict
- 2018 Kerch Strait incident
- 2023 Black Sea drone incident
- Seizure of the Smyrtos
- 2026 English Channel incident
