= USS Baton Rouge =

Los Angeles-class nuclear-powered attack submarine of the US Navy

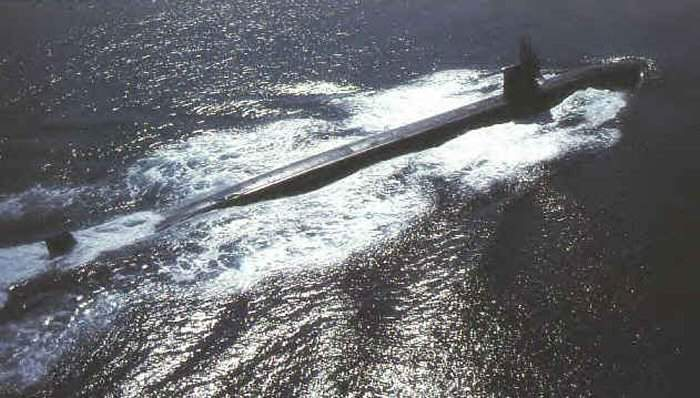
- USS Baton Rouge - Navy photo

History

United States
- Name: USS Baton Rouge
- Namesake: Baton Rouge, Louisiana
- Awarded: 8 January 1971
- Builder: Newport News Shipbuilding
- Laid down: 18 November 1972
- Launched: 26 April 1975
- Sponsored by: Mrs. F. Edward Hebert
- Commissioned: 25 June 1977
- Decommissioned: 13 January 1995
- Stricken: 13 January 1995
- Fate: Disposed of by submarine recycling
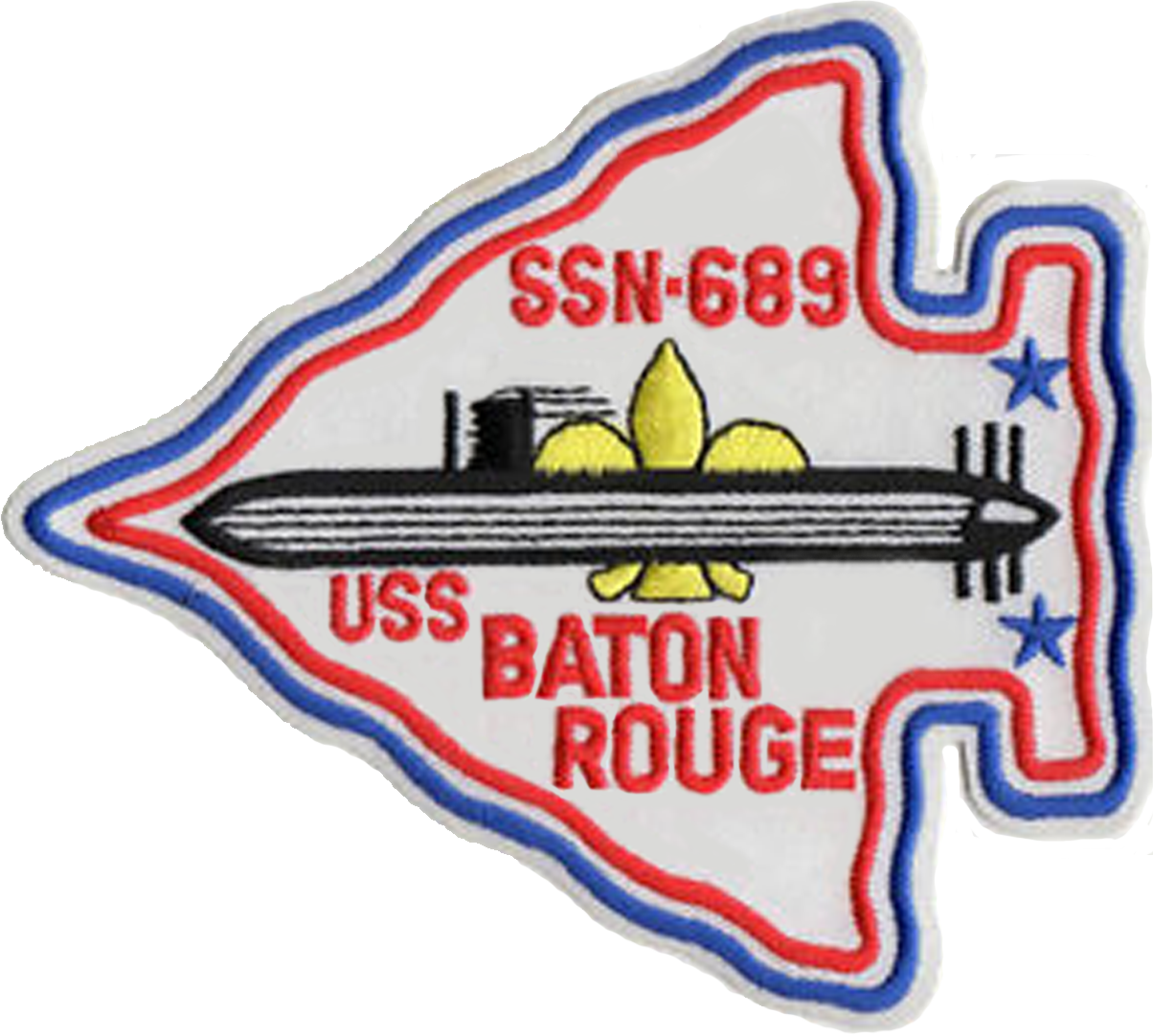
- Badge

General characteristics
- Class & type: Los Angeles-class submarine
- Displacement: 5,723 tons (surfaced); 6,927 tons (submerged)
- Length: 110.3 m (361 ft 11 in)
- Beam: 10 m (32 ft 10 in)
- Draft: 9.4 m (30 ft 10 in)
- Propulsion: S6G nuclear reactor, 2 turbines, 35,000 hp (26 MW), 1 auxiliary motor 325 hp (242 kW), 1 shaft
- Speed: 15 knots (28 km/h) surfaced; 33 knots (61 km/h) submerged 35 knots
- Test depth: 290 m (950 ft)
- Complement: 12 officers; 98 enlisted
- Armament: 4 × 21 in (533 mm) bow tubes; Mark 48 torpedo; Harpoon missiles; Tomahawk cruise missile

USS Baton Rouge (SSN-689) was a Los Angeles-class nuclear-powered attack submarine which served with the United States Navy. With her keel laid down on 18 November 1972, Baton Rouge was launched on 26 April 1975. She became the second Los Angeles-class submarine to be commissioned, on 25 June 1977. In 1995, she was the first of her class to be decommissioned, after a collision with a Russian Sierra-class submarine in 1992.

Baton Rouge was the first and currently only ship of the United States Navy to be named for Baton Rouge, Louisiana.

== Design ==
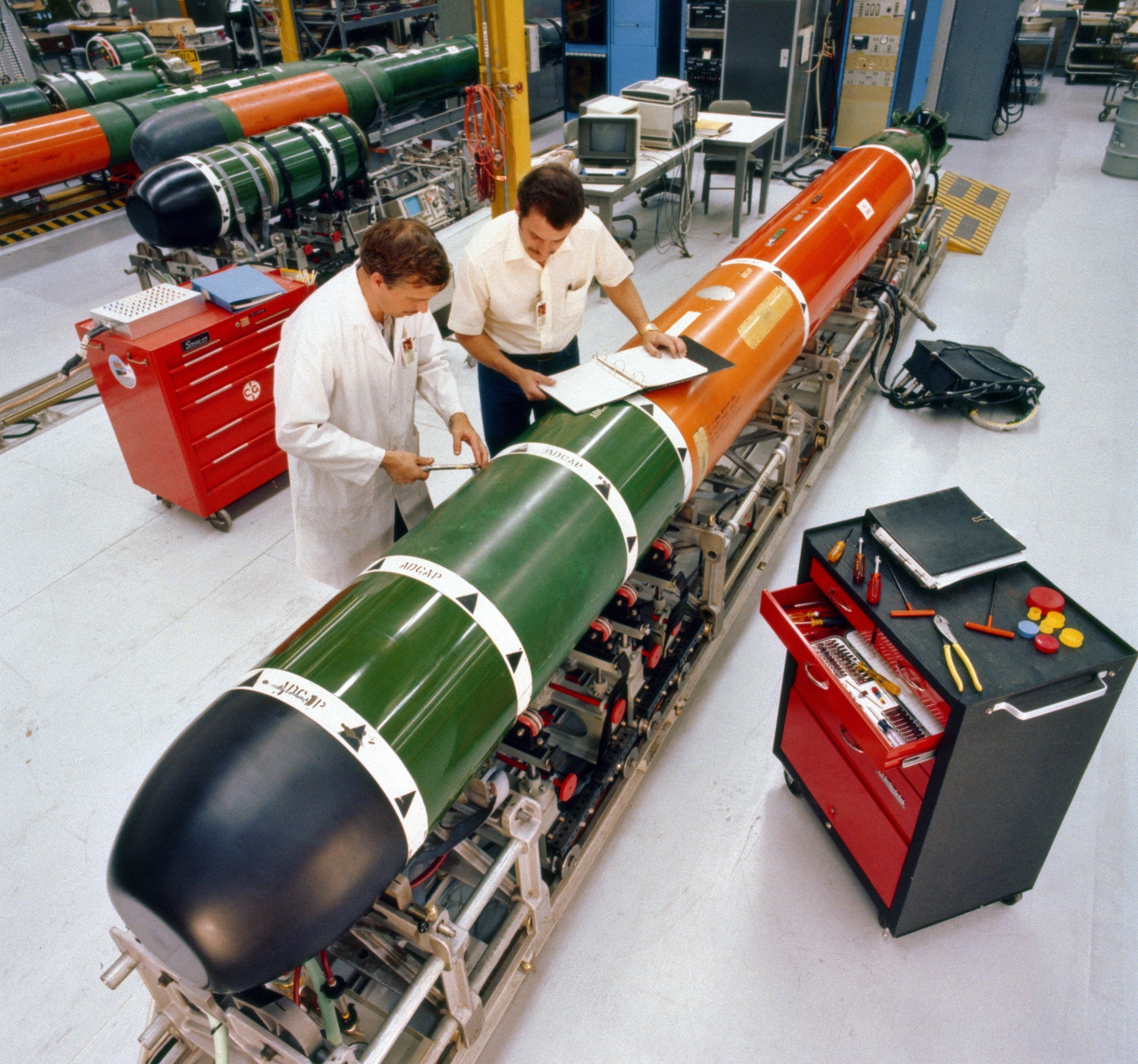
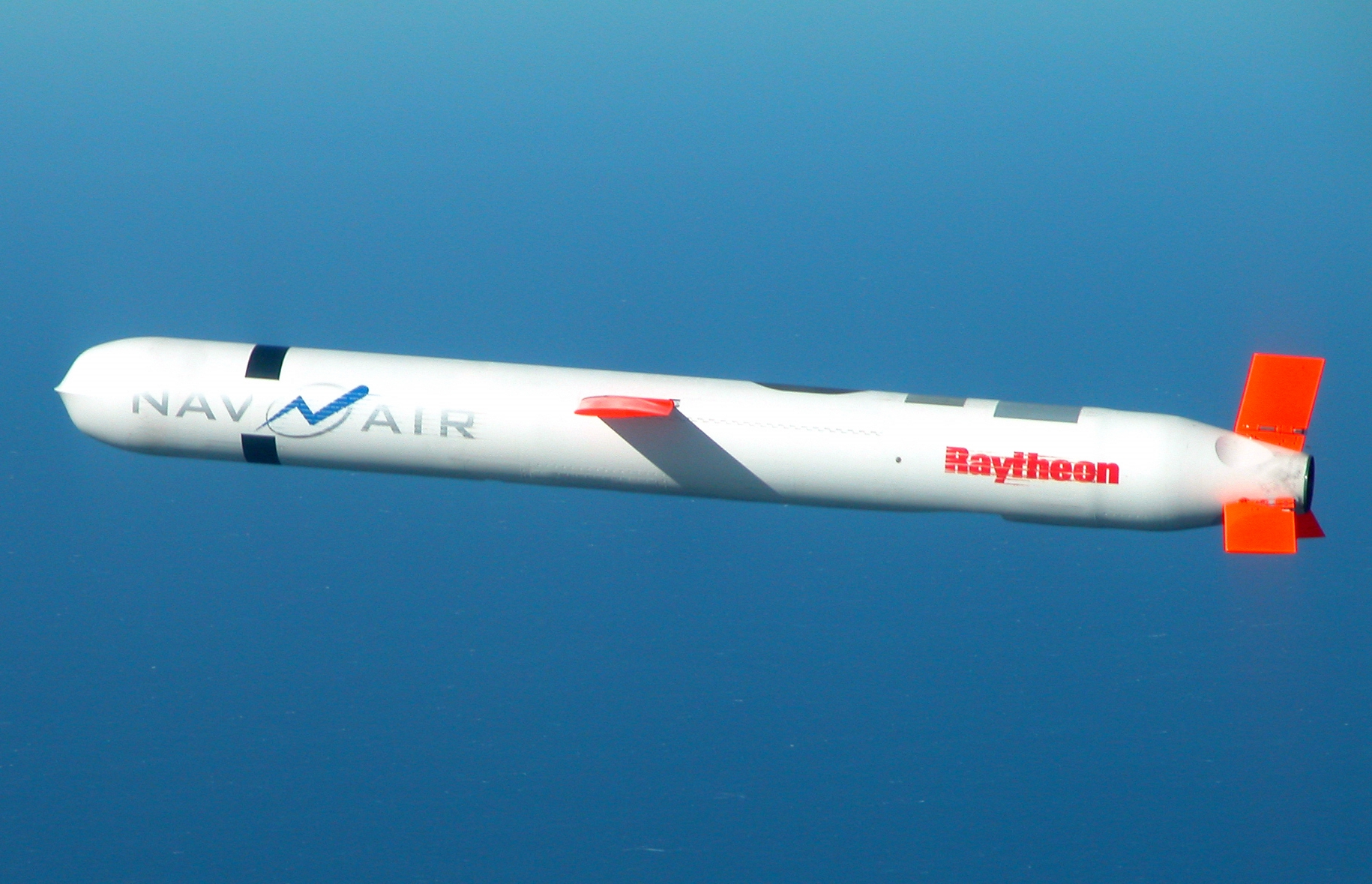
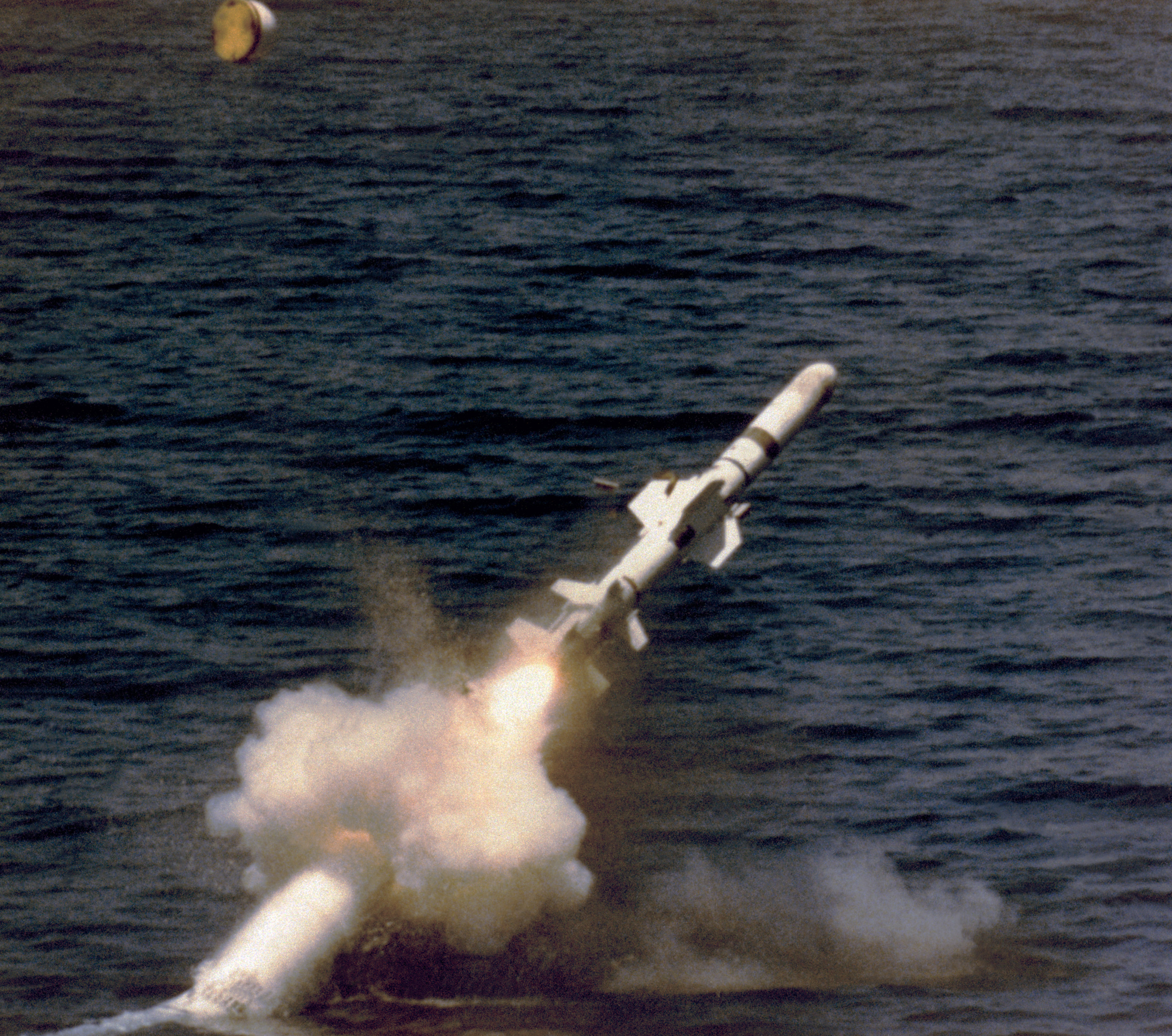
The three main weapons of Los Angeles-class submarines, and thus Baton Rouge, are the Mark 48 torpedo (top), the Tomahawk cruise missile (middle), and the Harpoon anti-ship missile (bottom).

Baton Rouge was a nuclear attack submarine and, as such, was optimized for anti-submarine warfare (ASW) and strike operations. To this end, she carried a complement of 26 weapons, including the Mark 48 ADCAP torpedoes – the main weapon of U.S. Navy submarines, Harpoon anti-ship missiles and subsonic Tomahawk cruise missiles. The latter has a range of either 280 or 1,600 miles (450 or 2,500 km), depending on whether it is anti-ship or strike variant, and is nuclear-compatible, although this capability is normally not deployed on Los Angeles-class submarines. Since the boat did not incorporate the vertical launching system found on later Los Angeles-class submarines, the Harpoons and Tomahawks were torpedo tube-launched. Baton Rouge can also lay Mobile Mark 67 and Mark 60 CAPTOR mines.

The boat's propulsion system comprised a S6G pressurized-water reactor based on the D2G reactor of the Bainbridge and Truxtun classes of cruiser. Heat produced from the S6G reactor converted water into steam, powering two turbines, and thus the propeller shaft (see Nuclear marine propulsion). Although the U.S. Navy discloses the boat's submerged speed to be "25+ knots (28+ miles per hour; 46.3+ km/h)," non-military sources have claimed that Los Angeles-class submarines' top speed to be in excess of 33 knots (38 mph; 61 km/h). The nuclear reactor fuel load had a lifespan of ten years.

A crucial component in Baton Rouge's ability to perform her mission were the comprehensive defensive, navigational and sonar systems. Among her several sonar sets were the TB-23/29 thin line passive towed array sonar, the Ametek BQS 15 close range high frequency active sonar and the Raytheon SADS-TG active detection sonar. These systems collaborated to give Baton Rouge good situational awareness. The boat's electronic support measures included a direction finding system, interceptor and a radar warner.

== Construction and commissioning ==
The contract to build Baton Rouge was awarded to Newport News Shipbuilding of Newport News, Virginia, on 8 January 1971, and her keel was laid down on 18 November 1972. Launched on 26 April 1975 in the presence of sponsor Mrs. Felix Edward Hebert, wife of the United States representative from the first district and the former chairman of the House Armed Services Committee, Baton Rouge was commissioned on 25 June 1977.

Based at Norfolk and assigned to Submarine Squadron 8, Baton Rouge's immediate history following the commissioning was characterized by shakedown training in New London, Connecticut, among other tests. During 5–29 July, she performed drills off the New England coast, returning to Norfolk for a month-long post-shakedown upkeep. From September 1977 to August 1978, she participated in numerous other tests, such as acoustic trials in Exuma Sound, The Bahamas, and weapons tests off Port Everglades, Florida. During this time, she returned periodically to Norfolk, and docked alongside USS L. Y. Spear, for upkeep, the longest of which spanned from February to August.

== Operational history ==
In preparations for her first overseas assignment, Baton Rouge was deployed to New London in September for training before returning to Norfolk for last-minute checks prior to the deployment. She left port on 19 October 1978, and raised her first port of call in La Maddalena, Sardinia, on 1 November. Baton Rouge also visited La Spezia and took part in a variety of ASW exercises through the winter of 1978 and 1979.

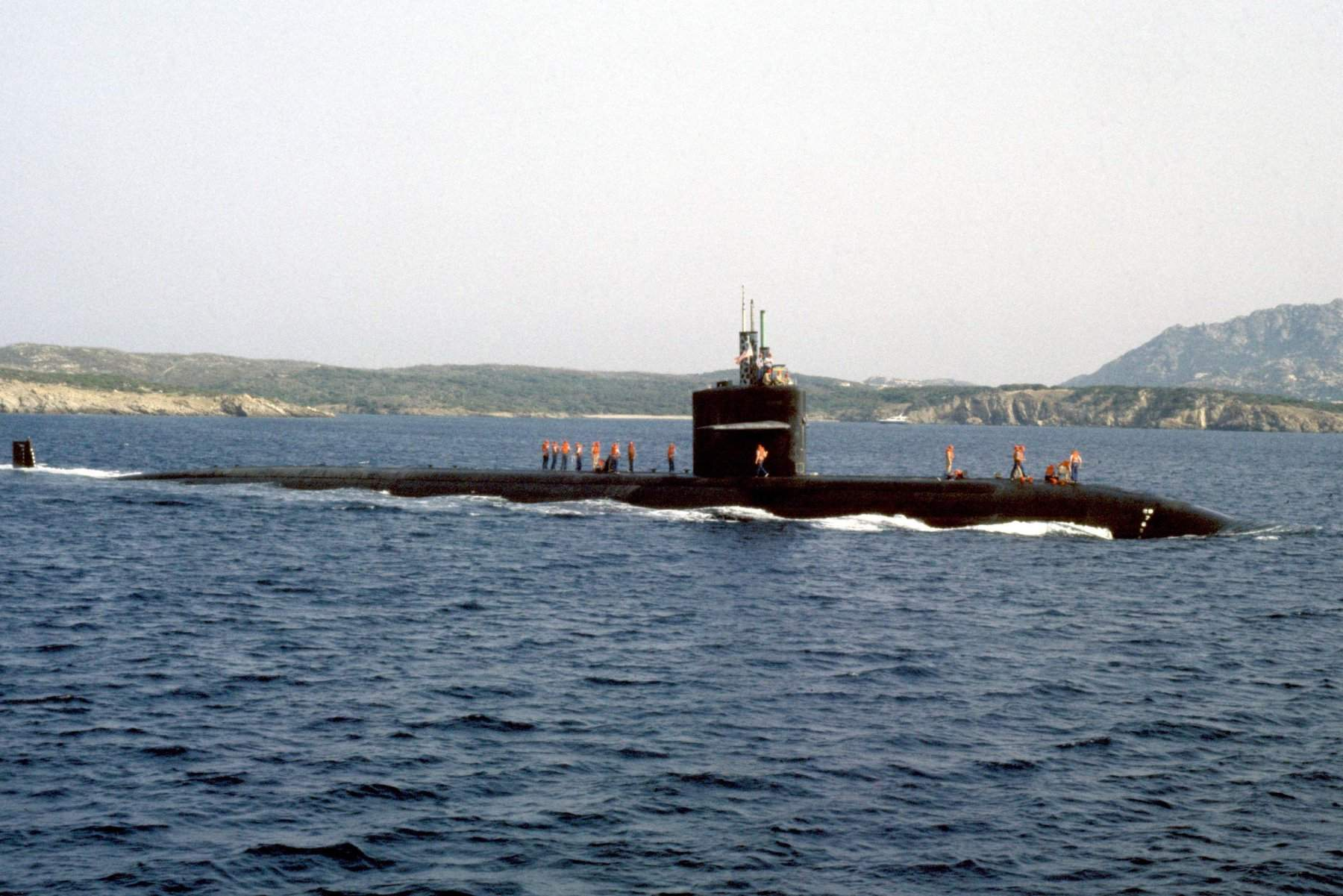
USS Baton Rouge underway near La Maddalena, Italy on 8 November 1984.

The submarine returned to Norfolk from her first overseas assignment in March 1979. After post-deployment stand-down, Baton Rouge resumed normal operations later that year. These included participation in two major ASW exercises and visits to such widely separated places as Fort Lauderdale, Florida, and Halifax, Nova Scotia. In July, she was assigned to Submarine Squadron 8 but continued to use Norfolk as her base of operations. During September–October, Baton Rouge participated in a major NATO exercise – Operation Ocean Safari – which took her across the Atlantic once more and included a call at Rotterdam, the Netherlands. She returned to Norfolk from that mission during the latter part of October and spent the remainder of 1979 in a restricted availability.

In 1980, she was deployed to the Indian Ocean and circumnavigated the earth, passing through the International Date Line and the Panama Canal. For the deployment, she was awarded the Navy Unit Commendation when she arrived in Norfolk. As was the case in the Indian Pacific in 1980, in 1981 Baton Rouge again came under the command of Commander in Chief, Atlantic Fleet (CINCLANTFLT), after which she received the Meritorious Unit Commendation. For the third time, Baton Rouge came under the command of CINCPACFLT when she made her second deployment to the Mediterranean Sea.

In the mid-1980s, the boat underwent an eighteen-month overhaul at the Norfolk Naval Shipyard. The overhaul, which ended in spring 1986, saw the addition to Baton Rouge the AN/BQQ-5C sonar system, the CCS Mk-1 digital fire-control system, and the ESGN navigation system. She made her third deployment to the Mediterranean in November 1986, and her fourth in January 1990. Between these two assignment, Baton Rouge conducted a deployment to the North Atlantic, and was awarded her second Meritorious Unit Commendation.

=== Collision with the Kostroma ===
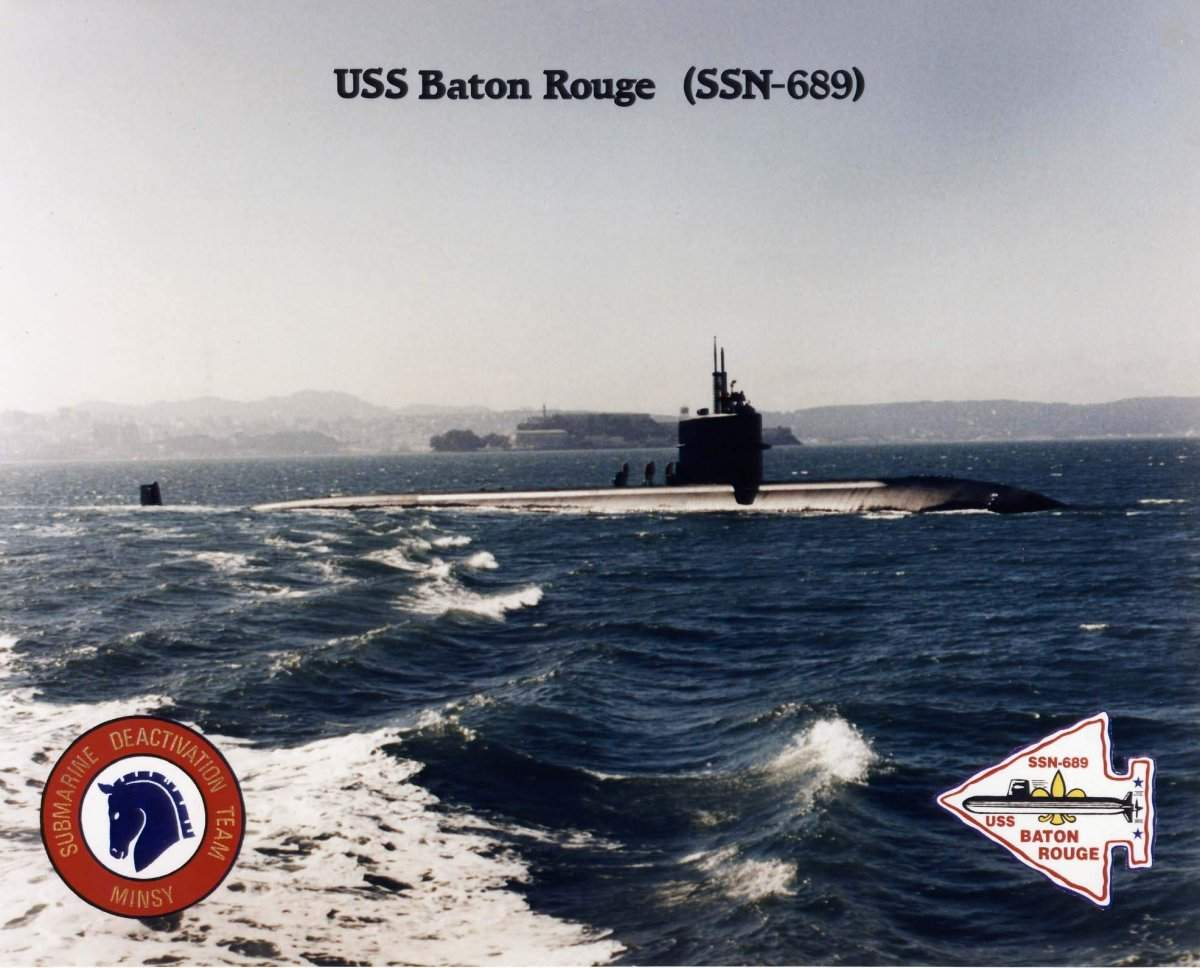
USS Baton Rouge prior to deactivation in 1995

At 20:16 local time on 11 February 1992, while on patrol off Kildin Island near Severomorsk, Baton Rouge collided with the Russian Sierra-class attack submarine K-276 Kostroma. The United States Navy stated that the collision occurred more than 12 miles (22 km) from the shore, in international waters. Initially the U.S. Navy denied any damage suffered by Baton Rouge, but it was later disclosed that the boat suffered two cuts, as well as dents and scrapes. Kostroma was fully repaired by 29 June 1992 and continues in service to this day, while Baton Rouge was removed from service soon afterward. The Navy was looking to make cuts in all classes of vessels at the time. Baton Rouge was just unlucky enough to be decommissioned for this reason. This is recorded in Russian navy lore as a victory and the Kostroma crew painted the number "1" bordered by a star on the sail, as did Soviet submarines during World War II to indicate the number of their victories.

== Decommissioning ==
Less than two years later, on 1 November 1993, Baton Rouge was placed in commission in reserve. On 13 January 1995, she became the first Los Angeles-class submarine to be decommissioned and stricken from the Naval Vessel Register, after less than 18 years in commission. As part of post-Cold War restructuring, the U.S. Navy decided to decommission 14 of the first 31 ships in the Los Angeles-class instead of refueling them, most at between 17 and 19 years of service. Some of Baton Rouge's sister ships served for 35 years or more after refueling. Ex-Baton Rouge entered the Nuclear Powered Ship-Submarine Recycling Program, and dismantling of the boat was complete by 30 September 1997.

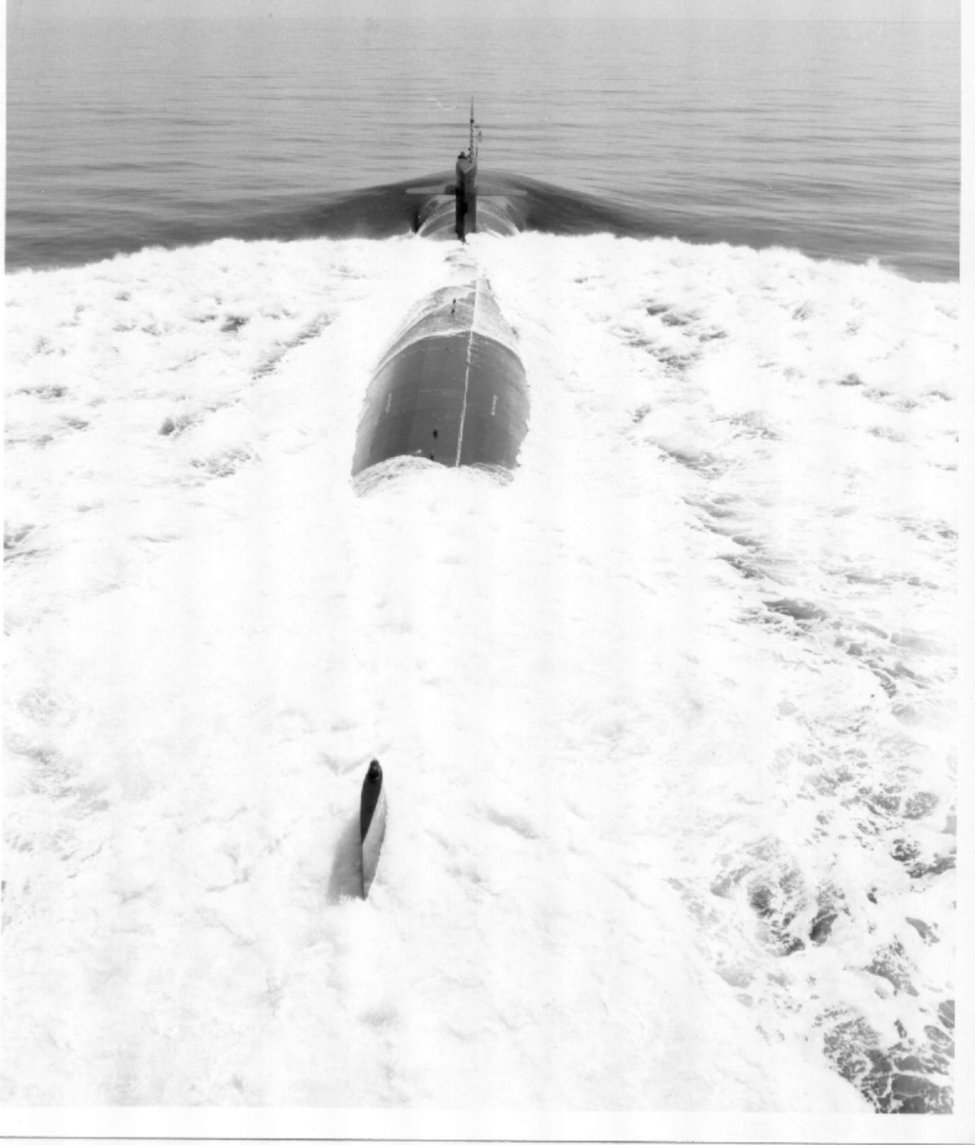
Baton Rouge during sea trials 1977

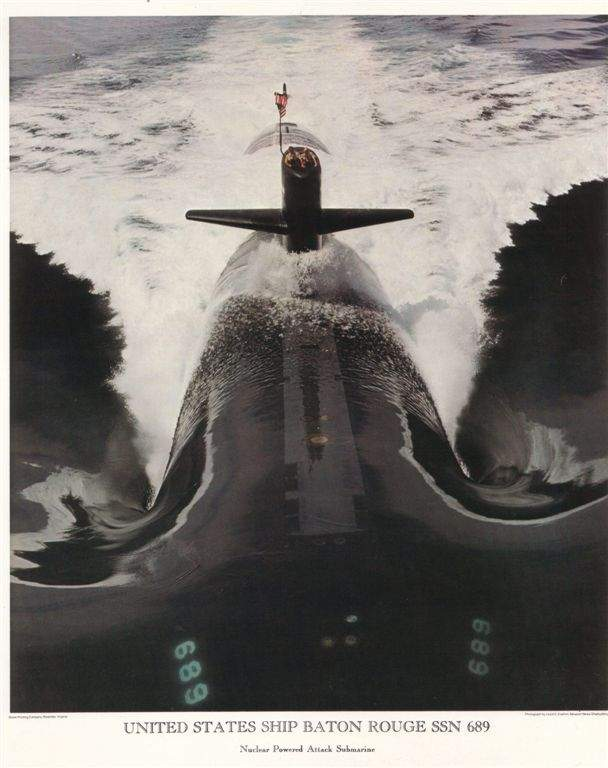
Baton Rouge during sea trials 1977

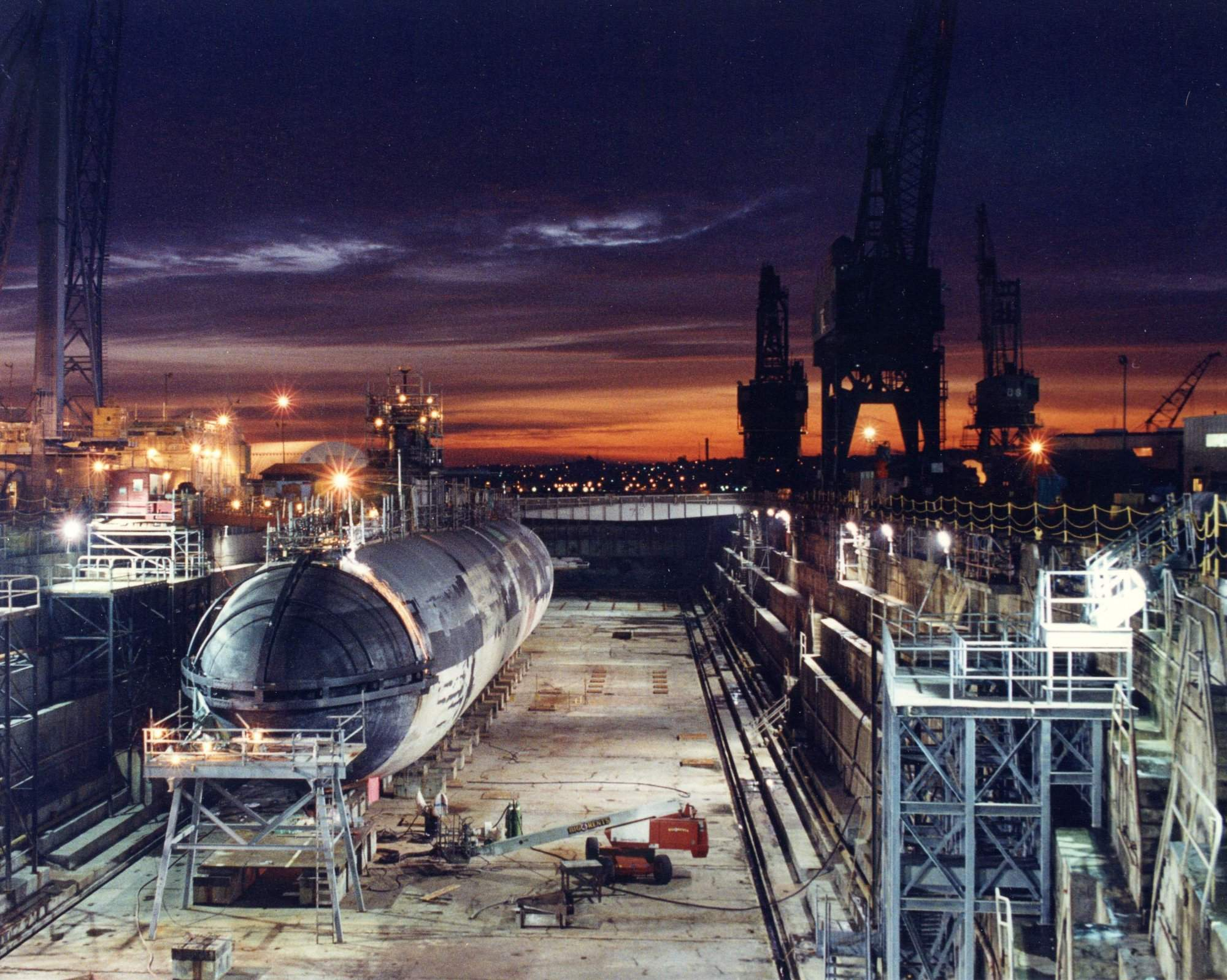
Baton Rouge being scrapped at Mare Island Naval Shipyard shortly after her decommissioning in February 1995
