= Baffles (submarine) =

Areas behind a submarine or ship where sonar cannot hear

Diagram of a submarine's baffles where its sonar is ineffective.

The baffles is the area in the water directly behind a submarine or ship through which a hull-mounted sonar cannot hear. This blind spot is caused by the need to insulate the sonar array, commonly mounted near the bow, from the noise of the vessel's machinery.

During the Cold War, one submarine would frequently attempt to follow another by hiding in its baffles. This led to the practice of "clearing the baffles", that is, turning to observe the blind spot and detect any followers. Related maneuvers included the "Crazy Ivan", a hard turn to clear the baffles and position the submarine to attack any followers, and "Angles and Dangles", a five-hour process of rapid direction and speed changes to ensure that all items aboard were properly secured for hard maneuvering and would not fall or shift suddenly, producing noise that the enemy could detect. The baffles-clearing maneuvers undertaken by Soviet Yankee-class submarines were dubbed "Yankee Doodles".

Hiding in a sub's baffles is dangerous because of the risk of collision. Such tactics have fallen out of use since the advent of the towed-array sonar, which negates the baffles' blind spot.

== Background and etymology ==
Since a sonar array is extremely sensitive to underwater sounds, it must be protected from the noise generated by machinery on the vessel on which the sonar is installed. Otherwise, its own noise would tend to drown out other sonar targets, making the sonar array ineffective. To reduce noise, sound-attenuating material is placed between the sonar and the rest of the vessel. This makes the sonar much more effective, but causes a blind spot where this material is: as most hull-mounted sonars are located at the front of the vessel, the boat's bow, the resulting blind spot is located directly behind the array, most commonly sternwards.

The term baffles is likely derived from a lesser-used definition of the word itself, that of "a partition that prevents interference between sound waves in a loudspeaker." In the instance of its usage in terminology pertaining to submarines, the definition can be expanded and slightly modified to, "an area behind the submarine that due to the cavitation and the wake left by the propulsion system impedes the ability for on-board sonar systems to accurately establish what, if anything, is behind the submarine."

== Maneuvers related to the baffles ==
=== Clearing the baffle area ===
A submarine tracking another submarine can take advantage of its target's baffles to follow at a close distance without being detected. Periodically, a submarine will perform a maneuver called clearing the baffles, in which the boat will turn left or right far enough to listen with the forward array sonar for a few minutes in the area that was previously blocked by the baffles. Good tactics require a submarine to clear baffles at irregular intervals and in different directions so that a pursuing submarine cannot predict when and how the next baffle-clearing maneuver will be made. When a submarine clears its baffles, a pursuing submarine must take measures to avoid detection by, or worse, collision with, the submarine ahead.

In some cases, submarine commanders could choose to clear baffles by executing one or a series of hard turns in order to not only clear the baffles, but also be in a favorable position to attack the potentially following submarine. Such extreme maneuvers were more commonly used by Soviet Navy submarines during the Cold War than by other forces, leading to the maneuver's nickname: "Crazy Ivan". The "crazy" came from the danger such a maneuver posed to both submarines, first being detection of the following submarine, which was commonly avoided by stopping the engines and going to maximum silence, and secondly by collision, as the momentum of the pursuing boat could result in collision with the leading submarine. The sudden, unexpected nature of the maneuver led to the term being used in the English-speaking world.

The term Crazy Ivan has sometimes separately been used to describe the possibility of a rogue Soviet leader committing to military action, typically in reference to a limited launch of ICBMs against the US, originating from the Tom Clancy novel The Hunt for Red October.

=== Angles and Dangles ===
Although not specifically a baffle-clearing maneuver, the exercise known as "Angles and Dangles" (a series of random figure eights, sharp turns, and depth changes) is intended to eliminate the unintended self-noise which could occur during a baffle-clearing event. The exercise is executed at the start of a voyage to determine if loose items aboard the submarine are properly stowed for maneuvers, loose items can fall or shift position during the sudden maneuvers required during baffle clearing, making noise that could be detected by the opposing submarine.

=== Use of towed array sonars ===
Nuclear submarines of the late Cold War and contemporary era, starting with the Soviet Project 667BDR, Project 671RTM/K, and American USS Narwhal, and ships, especially those equipped for anti-submarine warfare, carry a towed array sonar: a sonar sensor mounted on a long tow cable streamed out behind the vessel. This detects acoustic energy in the area behind the ship, reducing or even removing the need for baffle-clearing maneuvers. One reason for this is that towed-array sonars typically have a different frequency response than hull-mounted sonar sensors. Towed array sensors have conical-shaped beams and these beams become very broad when steered in a direction aligned with the array elements, known as the "end-fire" direction. As a result, have poor directivity in the "end-fire" regions of the array.
