= Russian submarine Carp =

History

Soviet Union, Russia
- Name: B-239 Carp
- Laid down: 20 July 1979
- Launched: 29 July 1983
- Commissioned: 29 September 1984
- Out of service: 1997 (in reserve)

General characteristics
- Class & type: Sierra-class submarine
- Displacement: 7,600 tons (surfaced); 9,100 tons (submerged)
- Length: 107 m (351 ft)
- Beam: 14.2 m (47 ft)
- Installed power: 1 × PWR; 190 MW
- Propulsion: 2 × 1002 hp emergency motors; 1 shaft, 2 spinners
- Speed: 10 knots (18.5 km/h; 11.5 mph) (surfaced); 32 knots (59.3 km/h; 36.8 mph) (submerged)
- Range: Unlimited, except by food supplies
- Complement: 61
- Armament: 4 × 650 mm (26 in) torpedo tubes; 4 × 530 mm (21 in) torpedo tubes; SS-N-21 Sampson SLCM with 200 kt nuclear warhead; SS-N-15 Starfish anti submarine weapon: 200 kt depth charge or 90 kg HE Type 40 torpedo; SS-N-16 Stallion, 200 kt depth charge or 90 kg HE Type 40 torpedo; Minelaying configuration: 42 mines instead of torpedoes

Service record
- Part of: Russian Northern Fleet

B-239 Carp (Russian: Карп) is a Russian Sierra-class submarine. It was known as K-239 before renaming in 1992. She was launched in 1983 and laid up in 1997. Withdrawn from the fleet on 05/30/1998.

In 2013, was planned for repair at the Zvyozdochka CS. According to the shipyard Zvezdochka the submarine's titanium hull was in good shape. As of May 16, 2014, fuel has already begun to be unloaded from the reactor. According to a report dated 7.7.2014, preparations began for the unloading of spent nuclear fuel.

In March 2015, it became known that the repair of the boat had been suspended.

As of 2020, the repair has been stopped, it is in reserve in Severovinsk.
