= Russian submarine Pskov =

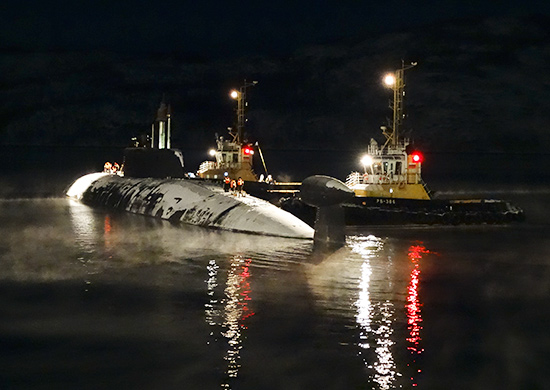
- Pskov in 2015

History

Russia
- Name: K-336 Pskov
- Builder: Krasnoye Sormovo Factory No. 112
- Laid down: 1990
- Launched: 1992
- Commissioned: 1993
- Status: Active

General characteristics
- Class & type: Sierra-class submarine
- Displacement: 7,600 tons (surfaced); 9,100 tons (submerged)
- Length: 107 m (351 ft)
- Beam: 14.2 m (47 ft)
- Propulsion: 1 × PWR, 190 MW; 2 × 1002 hp emergency motors; 1 shaft, 2 spinners
- Speed: 10 knots (18.5 km/h; 11.5 mph) (surfaced); 32 knots (59.3 km/h; 36.8 mph) (submerged)
- Range: Unlimited, except by food supplies
- Complement: 61
- Armament: 6 × 530 mm (21 in) torpedo tubes; SS-N-21 Sampson SLCM with 200 kt nuclear warhead; SS-N-15 Starfish anti submarine weapon: 200 kt depth charge or 90 kg HE Type 40 torpedo; SS-N-16 Stallion, 200 kt depth charge or 90 kg HE Type 40 torpedo; Minelaying configuration: 42 mines instead of torpedoes

Service record
- Part of: Russian Northern Fleet

Russian submarine K-336 Pskov Russian: Псков) is a Sierra-class Attack submarine of the Russian Navy. She is named after the Russian city Pskov.

== History ==
This ship, originally named Okun (Perch), was laid down as the last Sierra II-class submarine in 1990 at the Krasnoye Soromovo factory in Nizhny Novgorod. After the hull was launched in 1992, it was towed to the Sevmash shipyard in Severodvinsk for completion and sea trials.

The boat was commissioned in 1993, serving in the Russian Northern Fleet, based in Ara Bay, Vidyaevo. It was commanded by Captain 1st Rank Andrei Sapelkin, alongside Captain Lieutenant Viktor Petrashov, two of the most decorated leaders in the Russian Fleet.

On March 5, 2003, Pskov was being overhauled in a dry dock in Roslyakovo. The wooden scaffolding surrounding the hull was ignited by the welding work that was done to the ship, and a fire broke out. After 90 minutes, the fire was put out, and Pskov's outer soundproofing rubber coating was damaged. There were no casualties or radiation leakage. The submarine was believed to be operational again from early 2007.

In 2012 the submarine was overhauled again, and returned to active duty in 2016. The refit included a new sonar and replacement of uranium fuel in the submarine's reactor.

The submarine was reported as still active as of 2025, while in 2026, both she and her sister boat, B-534 Nizhny Novgorod, were described as in reserve and minimally active.
