= Sierra-class submarine =

Nuclear-powered attack submarine class

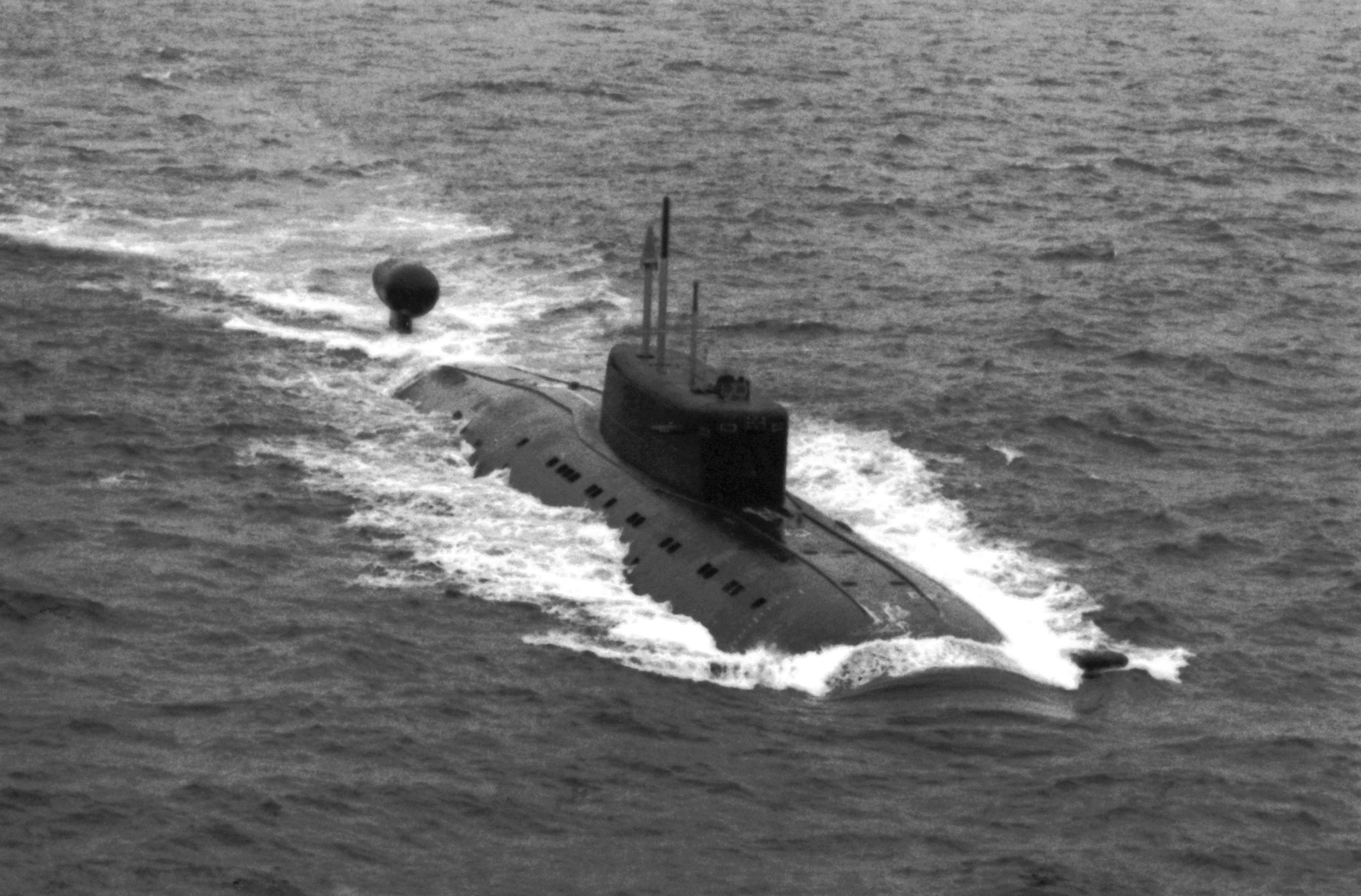
- A Sierra II submarine underway

Class overview
- Name: Sierra class
- Builders: Krasnoye Sormovo
- Operators: Soviet Navy; Russian Navy
- Preceded by: Alfa class, Victor class
- Succeeded by: Akula class
- Built: 1979–1992
- In commission: 1984–present
- Planned: 5
- Completed: 4
- Canceled: 1
- Active: 2
- Laid up: 2

General characteristics
- Type: Nuclear attack submarine
- Displacement: Sierra I: 7,200 tons (surfaced); 8,300 tons (submerged); Sierra II: 7,600 tons (surfaced); 9,100 tons (submerged)
- Length: Sierra I: 107.16 m (351.6 ft); Sierra II: 110 m (360 ft)
- Beam: Sierra I: 12.28 m (40.3 ft); Sierra II: 14.2 m (47 ft)
- Draft: Sierra I: 8.8 m (29 ft); Sierra II: 8.8 m (29 ft)
- Propulsion: Sierra I & II: 1 × PWR, 190 MW (HEU <= 45%); 2 × 1,002 hp (747 kW) emergency motors; 1 shaft, 2 spinners
- Speed: Sierra I & II: 10 knots (18.5 km/h) (surfaced); Sierra I: 34 knots (63.0 km/h) (submerged); Sierra II: 32 knots (59.3 km/h) (submerged)
- Range: Effectively unlimited, except by food supplies
- Complement: Sierra I & II: 61 & 72
- Armament: Sierra I & II: 4 × 650 mm (26 in) torpedo tubes (only Sierra I); 4 × 530 mm (21 in) torpedo tubes ( 6 x Sierra II); SS-N-21 Sampson SLCM; SS-N-15 Starfish anti-submarine weapon: 200 kt depth charge or 90 kg HE Type 40 torpedo; SS-N-16 Stallion, 200 kt depth charge or 90 kg HE Type 40 torpedo; Minelaying configuration: 42 mines instead of torpedoes

The Sierra class (Soviet Project 945 Barrakuda and Project 945A Kondor; NATO reporting names Sierra I and Sierra II) are a series of nuclear-powered attack submarines built for the Soviet Navy and currently in service with the Russian Navy. The Sierra II boats are the only titanium-hulled submarines currently commissioned in the Russian Navy.

The Sierra class was a third generation Soviet attack submarine. It resembles the Alfa-class submarine in having a light and strong titanium pressure hull which enables the submarines of the class to dive to greater depths, reduce the level of radiated noise and increase resistance to torpedo attacks. It is powered by a single OK-650 pressurized water reactor. Due to the difficulties of working with titanium, and later also the fall of the Soviet Union, only two boats each of the Sierra I and Sierra II variants were made. The Akula-class submarine was created as an alternative to the Sierra class, being very similar but made of steel, and became much more numerous in the Soviet and Russian navies.

The upgraded version, the Sierra II class was specifically developed for search and destroy missions against United States Navy nuclear submarines. It has speeds and diving depth greater than its American counterparts at the time it was designed. It has also improved quieting and sonar. As of 2019 the Sierra I boats were in the reserve fleet, while the Sierra II boats were still active. In 2024 it was reported that the Sierra II submarines are docked at the Nerpa shipyard in Snezhnogorsk, Murmansk Oblast, and will undergo a modernization of their internal systems, though the refit had not started yet.

== Versions ==
=== Project 945 Barrakuda (Sierra I) ===
Project 945

The first submarine of the Project 945, Carp, was laid down in July 1979 at the Gorky shipyard and was launched in August 1983 before being transferred to Severodvinsk for fitting out. It was laid up in 1997. The next hull to be built was Kostroma, which was launched in July 1986 and was commissioned in September 1987. K-276 Kostroma was put into a drydock after its 11 February 1992 collision with the US submarine Baton Rouge in the Barents Sea, off Kildin Island. The submarine was repaired on 3 June 1992 and was renamed Krab on 6 April 1993, but in 1996 its original name Kostroma was restored. The Sierra I class was also fitted with a releasable escape pod for the crew. The pod is covered by a V-shaped casing on the port side of the sail.

=== Project 945A Kondor (Sierra II) ===
Project 945A

The Project 945A has a considerably larger sail which is 5 m (16.4 ft) longer than the Sierra I class. The sail also has a curious flat, square leading edge. The masts are offset on the starboard side to make way for two escape pods in the sail. The starboard side also has a 10-point environment sensor fitted at right angles to the front end of the sail. Also, the Sierra II class has a much larger pod on its after fin. The pod houses the Skat 3 passive very low frequency towed sonar array.

Of the two existing submarines of type Sierra II, the Pskov was in overhaul between 2011 and 2015 according to the Russian website Deep storm. The aforementioned website acknowledges activity of Nizhniy Novgorod under the command of Captain 1st Rank Alexey Ananko in both 2008 and 2013.

Both Nizhniy Novgorod and Pskov took part in a large naval exercise in October 2019.

=== Project 945AB (Sierra III) ===
Project 945AB

The single submarine of the Project 945AB was laid down in March 1990 but was scrapped in November 1993 before completion.

== Aborted Barrakuda (Sierra I) modernization ==
Modernization of the Carp and Kostroma of Project 945 for the Russian Navy was anticipated in the 2010s, but in the event, was not completed. A January 2013 contract for refit and recommission of the two submarines was signed with the Zvezdochka Shipyard in Severodvinsk, with the refit expected to take three years. It was originally planned that the submarines would be transferred to Zvezdochka before end of April 2013, with the overhaul beginning in summer 2013. Zvezdochka was to carry out the refit, repair mechanical parts, and replace nuclear fuel and all electrical equipment of the submarines. The submarines were also expected to receive a new sonar, combat information management system (BIUS), the GLONASS navigation system and new armament consisting of the Kalibr cruise missiles. However, in March 2015 it was reported that the final decision on the modernization of submarines Carp and Kostroma had not yet been made due to cost issues.

== Units ==
#	Name	Project	Laid down	Launched	Commissioned	Fleet	Status	Notes
B-239	Carp	945	20 July 1979	29 July 1983	29 September 1984	Northern Fleet	Reserve	
B-276	Kostroma	945	21 April 1984	26 July 1986	27 November 1987	Northern Fleet	Reserve	Projected repairs "indefinitely suspended" as of July 2018
B-534	Nizhny Novgorod	945A	15 February 1986	8 July 1989	26 December 1990	Northern Fleet	Both said to be in reserve/minimally active as of 2026	
B-336	Pskov	945A	29 June 1989	28 July 1992	17 December 1993	Northern Fleet	Both said to be in reserve/minimally active as of 2026	Last overhaul completed in 2015.

== See also ==
- List of Soviet and Russian submarine classes
- List of submarine classes in service
- Future of the Russian Navy
- Attack submarine
- Cruise missile submarine
