= Towed array sonar =

System of hydrophones

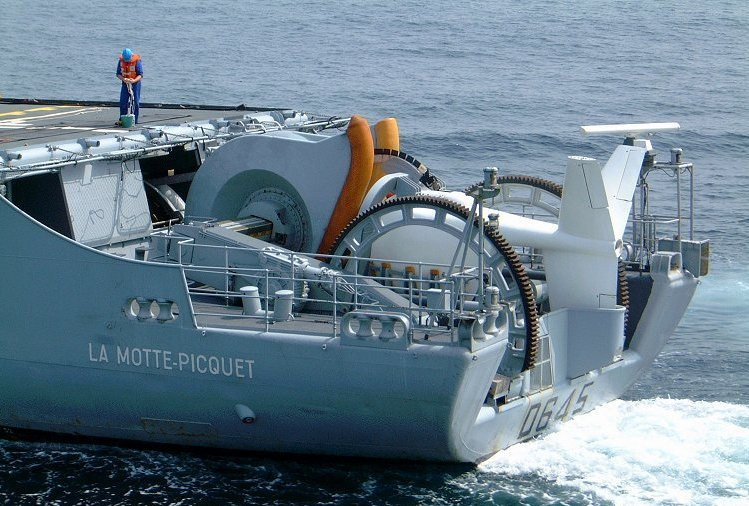
The DUBV 43C towed array sonar of La Motte-Picquet (D 645)

A towed array sonar is a system of hydrophones towed behind a submarine or a surface ship on a cable. Trailing the hydrophones behind the vessel, on a cable that can be kilometers long, keeps the array's sensors away from the ship's own noise sources, greatly improving its signal-to-noise ratio, and hence the effectiveness of detecting and tracking faint contacts, such as quiet, low noise-emitting submarine threats, or seismic signals.

A towed array offers superior resolution and range compared with hull-mounted sonar. It also covers the baffles, the blind spot of hull-mounted sonar. However, effective use of the system limits a vessel's speed and care must be taken to protect the cable from damage.

== History ==
During World War I, a towed sonar array known as the "Electric Eel" was developed by Harvey Hayes, a U.S. Navy physicist. This system is believed to be the first towed sonar array design. It employed two cables, each with a dozen hydrophones attached. The project was discontinued after the war.

The U.S. Navy resumed development of towed array technology during the 1960s in response to the development of nuclear-powered submarines by the Soviet Union.

== Current use ==
On surface ships, towed array cables are normally stored in drums, then spooled out behind the vessel when in use. U.S. Navy submarines typically store towed arrays inside an outboard tube, mounted along the vessel's hull, with an opening on the starboard tail. There is also equipment located in a ballast tank (free flood area) while the cabinet used to operate the system is inside the submarine.

Hydrophones in a towed array system are placed at specific distances along the cable, the end elements far enough apart to gain a basic ability to triangulate on a sound source. Similarly, various elements are angled up or down giving an ability to triangulate an estimated vertical depth of target. Alternatively three or more arrays are used to aid in depth detection.

On the first few hundred meters from the ship's propeller there are usually no hydrophones, because their effectiveness would be reduced by noise (cavitation and hull flow noises), vibration and turbulence generated by the propulsion—which would repeat the same problems of ship-mounted arrays. Surveillance Towed Array Sensor Systems used by surface ships have a sonar array mounted on a cable, which pulls a depth-adjustable remote operated vehicle (ROV). Another weighted cable may trail from the ROV connector, dropping the towed array to a lower depth. Long seismic streamers have intermediate paravanes along their length which can be used to adjust the depth of the array in real time.

Changing an ROV's depth allows a towed array to be deployed in different thermal layers, giving a surface anti-submarine warfare (ASW) vessel a view above and below the layer. This compensates for density and temperature differences, which conduct sound above or below a thermal layer by reflection. By dropping the array's 'tail' below the layer, a surface ASW platform can better detect a quiet, submerged contact hiding in cold water below a warm upper layer. A submarine can likewise monitor surface combatants by floating the tail of its array above a thermal layer while lurking below.

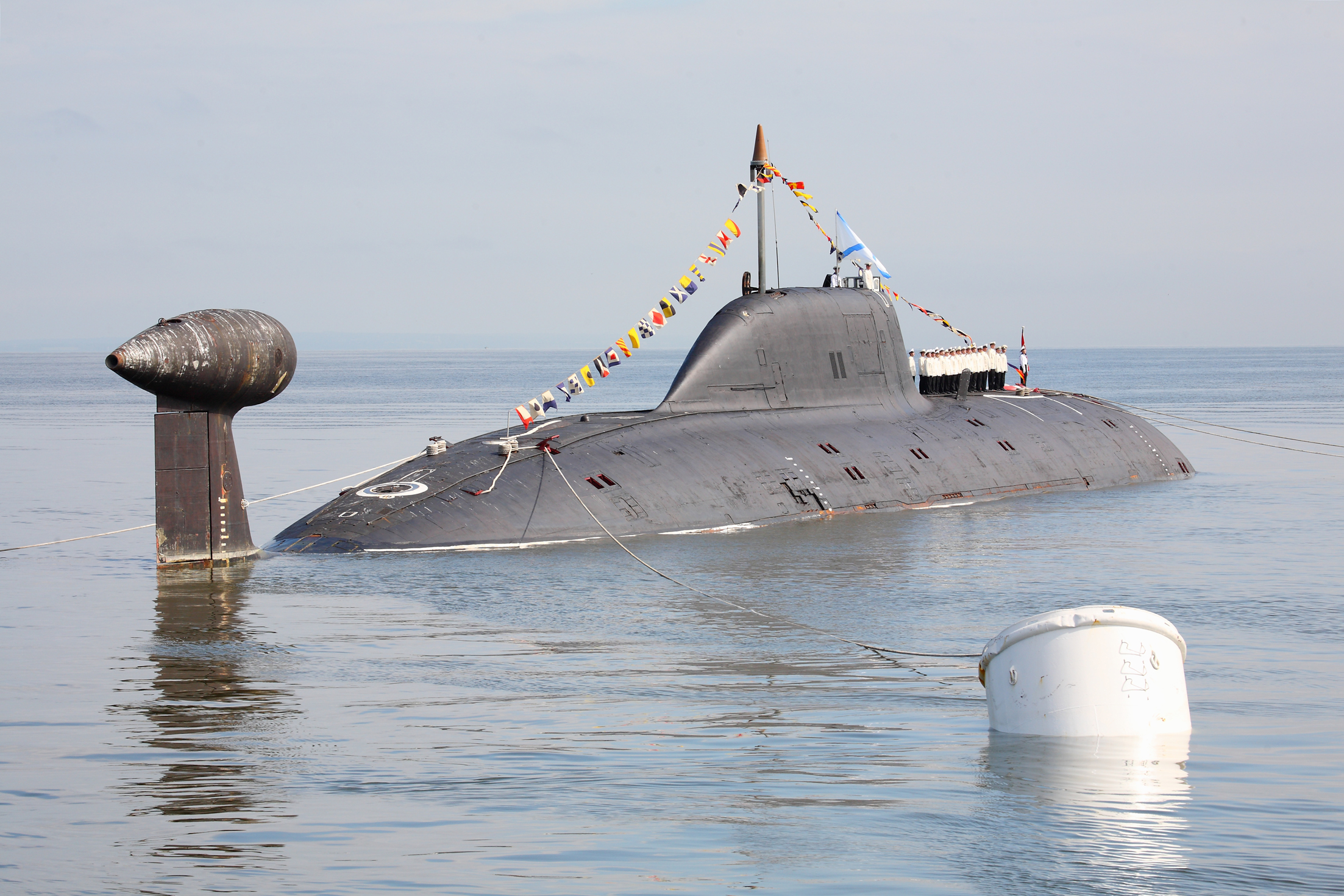
When not deployed, an Akula's towed array is stored in a teardrop-shaped container mounted on top of the vertical fin.

The array's hydrophones can be used to detect sound sources, but the real value of the array is that the signal processing technique of beamforming and Fourier analysis can be used not only to calculate the distance and the direction of a sound source, but also to identify the type of ship by the distinctive, acoustic signature of its machinery noises. For this, the relative positions of the hydrophones need to be known, usually possible only when the cable is in a straight line (stable), or when a self-sensing system (see strain gauges) or GPS or other methods embedded in the cable, and reporting relative position of hydrophone elements, is used to monitor the shape of the array and correct for curvature.

As an example, Thales Underwater Systems' CAPTAS-2 (passive and active sonar) claims a detection range up to 60 km and weighs 16t. The heavier CAPTAS-4 weighs 20-34t and claims a detection range up to 150 km.

=== Use in geophysics ===
Towed array systems are also used by the oil and gas industry for seismic exploration of geological formations under the sea bed. The systems used are similar in concept to the naval ones, but are typically longer and with more streamers in a given array (6 or more in some cases). Typical hydrophone spacing along each streamer is on the order of two meters, and each streamer may be up to 10 km long. Sometimes streamers are flown at different heights, to give a so-called 3D array.

=== Limitations ===
Effective use of the towed array system requires a vessel to maintain a straight, level course over a data sampling interval. Maneuvering, or changing course, disturbs the array and complicates analysis of the sampled data stream. These periods of instability are closely tested during sea trials and known by the crew's officers and enlisted sonar experts. Modern systems compensate by constantly self-measuring the relative positions of the array, element to element, reporting back data that can be automatically corrected for curvatures by computers as part of the beamforming math processing.

A ship must also limit its overall top speed while a towed array is deployed. Hydrodynamic drag increases as a square function of velocity, and could tear the cable or damage its mooring hardware. Furthermore, a minimum speed may have to be established depending on the buoyancy of the towed array (military arrays are ballasted to sink, geophysics arrays are supposed to be neutrally buoyant at about 10 m). The array could also be damaged by contact with the seafloor or if the vessel operates astern propulsion, or can even be damaged if it bends too tightly.

== See also ==
- Aperture synthesis
- FFT
- Phased array
- Spectrum analyzer
- Synthetic-aperture sonar
- Towed pinger locator
