= HMS Sceptre (S104) =

Swiftsure-class nuclear-powered fleet submarine of the Royal Navy

History

United Kingdom
- Name: HMS Sceptre
- Operator: Royal Navy
- Ordered: 1 November 1971
- Builder: Vickers
- Laid down: 19 February 1974
- Launched: 20 November 1976
- Sponsored by: Lady Audrey White
- Commissioned: 14 February 1978
- Decommissioned: 10 December 2010 at Devonport
- Home port: Faslane
- Motto: Honour With Authority
- Status: Decommissioned
- Badge

General characteristics
- Class & type: Swiftsure-class submarine
- Displacement: 4,900 tonnes (dived)
- Length: 82.9 m (272 ft 0 in)
- Beam: 9.8 m (32 ft 2 in)
- Draught: 8.5 m (27 ft 11 in)
- Propulsion: 1 × Rolls-Royce pressurised water nuclear reactor (PWR1)
- Speed: In excess of 20 knots (37 km/h; 23 mph), dived
- Complement: 116 officers and ratings
- Armament: 5 × 21 in (533 mm) torpedo tubes; Spearfish torpedoes; RN Sub Harpoon missiles; Tomahawk missiles

The fifth HMS Sceptre is a Swiftsure-class submarine built by Vickers in Barrow-in-Furness. She was launched in 1976, with a bottle of cider against her hull. She was commissioned on 14 February 1978, by Lady Audrey White. She was the tenth nuclear fleet submarine to enter service with the Royal Navy. She was decommissioned on 10 December 2010, at which time she was the oldest commissioned vessel in the Royal Navy still available for service; in total around 1,500 men served aboard during her commission. In theory, she is replaced by the first Astute-class submarine in service, HMS Astute.

== Service ==
=== Collision with a Soviet submarine ===
Sceptre has suffered several severe accidents in her career. On 23 May 1981 she collided with Soviet submarine K-211 and her reactor's protection systems would have performed an automatic emergency shutdown (scrammed the reactor), but her captain ordered the safety mechanisms overridden (battleshort enabled). The crew were told to say that they had hit an iceberg.

Much of Sceptre's forward outer casing was torn away; there was damage to the fin with the bridge no longer there; and the propeller of the Russian boat had cut into the pressure hull. This incident was disclosed when David Forghan, Sceptre's former weapons officer, gave a television interview which was broadcast on 19 September 1991. The Soviet submarine collided with was K-211 of the Delta III class, which on 23 May 1981 collided with an unknown submarine, identified at the time as an unknown Sturgeon-class American submarine.

=== 1987 refit ===
In 1987 Sceptre was fitted with an improved reactor core (Core Z). In March 1990, there was a coolant leak while Sceptre was at Devonport. On 20 October 1991, there was a fire onboard while the boat was moored at Faslane. In August 1995 Sceptre was forced to abort her patrol and return to Faslane after suffering, in the words of the Ministry of Defence, "an unspecified fault in the propulsion system." A defect in Sceptre's reactor was discovered in 1998, though its seriousness was not appreciated until after the investigation of another serious accident.

=== Scotia incident (1989) ===
In November 2010, it was reported in Hansard that Sceptre had snagged the nets of the fishing vessel Scotia in November 1989.

=== Propulsion trial accident (2000) ===
On 6 March 2000 Sceptre suffered a serious accident while inside a drydock at the Rosyth yards while undergoing trials towards the end of a major refit. The test involved flooding the drydock, and running the main engines slowly with steam supplied from the shore. However, too much steam was used and the engines went to full speed. Sceptre broke her moorings and shot forward off the cradle she rested on. The steam line ruptured, scaffolding buckled, a crane was pushed forward some 15 feet, and the submarine moved forward some 20 yards (18 m) inside the dock.

=== Return to active service (2003) ===
The investigation into the runaway also looked at Sceptre's reactor problems, and recommended that the boat be scrapped. In January 2002, with Sceptre still laid up, Defence Minister Adam Ingram declared that the problem was "small original fabrication imperfections" in the reactor pressure vessel. He could not say how long it would take to inspect and repair the problem. In March 2003, Sceptre left Rosyth Dockyard, after being in refit for six years, to undertake sea trials; she was the last submarine refitted in Rosyth. In late October 2003, Sceptre completed her post-refit sea trials and returned to active service.

=== Gibraltar controversy (2005) ===
On 3 February 2005, Sceptre put in at Gibraltar for repairs, expecting to leave within six days. British officials assured Spanish officials that damage is in the cooling system of the boat's diesel generator, not to the nuclear propulsion system. (Tireless spent much of 2000 at Gibraltar repairing a leak in her reactor coolant system.) Nonetheless, Spain's Foreign Minister Miguel Angel Moratinos registered Spain's "firm protest" with Jack Straw, and insisted that Sceptre be the last British submarine repaired at Gibraltar. In addition, Peter Caruana, Gibraltar's Chief Minister, claimed that he had been misinformed about the repairs by the British Ministry of Defence, and that he had learned the true extent of the problems from Spanish sources. London officials had told him that the repairs were all external, neglecting to mention the diesel generator's cooling system. On 7 February 2005, British military spokeswoman Katherine Purdhoe announced that repairs had been completed; the boat left Gibraltar on 9 February.

== Fate ==
HMS Sceptre was sent to the Falkland Islands to support the British garrison in March 2010, during Desire Petroleum's exploratory oil drilling.

Sceptre returned to Devonport for the last time in May 2010 and was decommissioned on 10 December 2010 after 32 years of service. Her decommissioning ceremony was witnessed by 450 people and was conducted by Royal Naval Chaplain Rev. Bernard Clarke; in attendance was also the Mayor of Wigan, Michael Winstanley, as a representative of the town she long had an affiliation with. As of 2020, she is docked at HMNB Devonport, Plymouth awaiting dismantling.

== Affiliations ==
- The town of Wigan.
- Scots Guards.
- Yorkshire University Royal Naval Unit (YURNU).
