= Russian submarine Petropavlovsk-Kamchatskiy =

Ballistic Missile Submarine

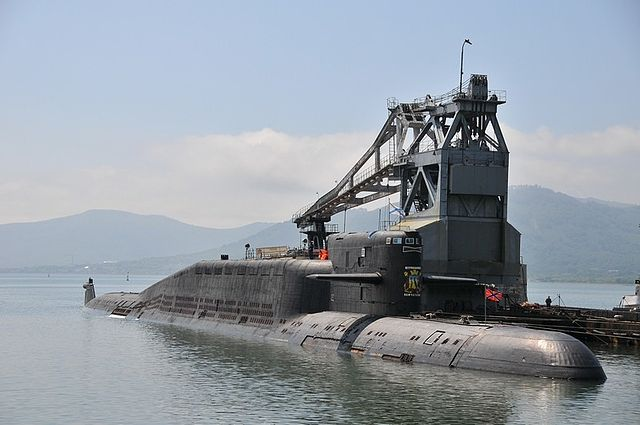

History

Soviet Union, Russia
- Name: K-211 Petropavlovsk-Kamchatskiy
- Namesake: Petropavlovsk-Kamchatskiy
- Builder: Sevmash, Severodvinsk
- Laid down: 19 August 1976
- Launched: 13 January 1979
- Commissioned: 28 September 1979
- Decommissioned: 19 November 2010
- Status: Awaiting disposal

General characteristics
- Class & type: Delta III-class submarine
- Displacement: Surfaced: 13,500 tons; Submerged: 18,200 tons
- Length: 166 m (544 ft 7 in)
- Beam: 12.3 m (40 ft 4 in)
- Draught: 8.8 m (28 ft 10 in)
- Propulsion: Two pressurized water-cooled reactors powering two steam turbines delivering 44,700 kW (59,900 hp)
- Speed: Surfaced: 14 knots (26 km/h; 16 mph); Submerged: 24 knots (44 km/h; 28 mph)
- Complement: 135
- Armament: 16 × R-29R (SS-N-18) missiles; 4 × 533 mm (21 in) bow torpedo tubes

K-211 Petropavlovsk-Kamchatskiy is a Project 667BDR Kalmar class (NATO reporting name: Delta III) Russian nuclear ballistic missile submarine. The submarine was built by Sevmash, Severodvinsk in the late 1970s and joined the Soviet fleet in 1980. The submarine continued to serve in the Russian Navy as part of the Pacific Fleet after the collapse of the Soviet Union. She was decommissioned in 2010 and is currently laid up, awaiting disposal. Her role and those of the other boats of her class is being taken by the new Borei-class submarines.

On 28 July 2017 the name Petropavlovsk-Kamchatskiy was assigned to the Kilo-class submarine B-274, under construction as of 2019. From 2017 to 2018 Rosatom undertook the removal of nuclear waste and components, with removal of the reactors complete by December 2018. As of 2019 K-211 is laid up at the Zvezda shipyard at Bolshoy Kamen awaiting disposal.

== Service ==
=== Collision with a British submarine ===
On 23 May 1981 she collided with the British submarine HMS Sceptre.
