= My Beloved Arctic =

Unofficial anthem of the Murmansk region of Russia

"My Beloved Arctic" (Russian: «Я люблю моё Заполярье») is the unofficial anthem of the Murmansk region of Russia.

== History ==
The song was written by Vladimir A. Popov (music) and Vladimir Smirnov (lyrics). As of 2007, the song plays every hour at Five Corners, the main square of Murmansk, from chimes installed in the Hotel Arctic. These chimes were installed in 1996 (the 60th anniversary of the establishment of Murmansk) at the initiative of mayor Oleg Naydenov. From 2007 to 2009 the chimes were silenced for repairs. and in 2009 the hotel was closed for renovation.

The song is used in Murmansk schools for the cultural and patriotic education of children, and the title was used as the name of a festival of patriotic song held on the 70th anniversary of the establishment of Murmansk.

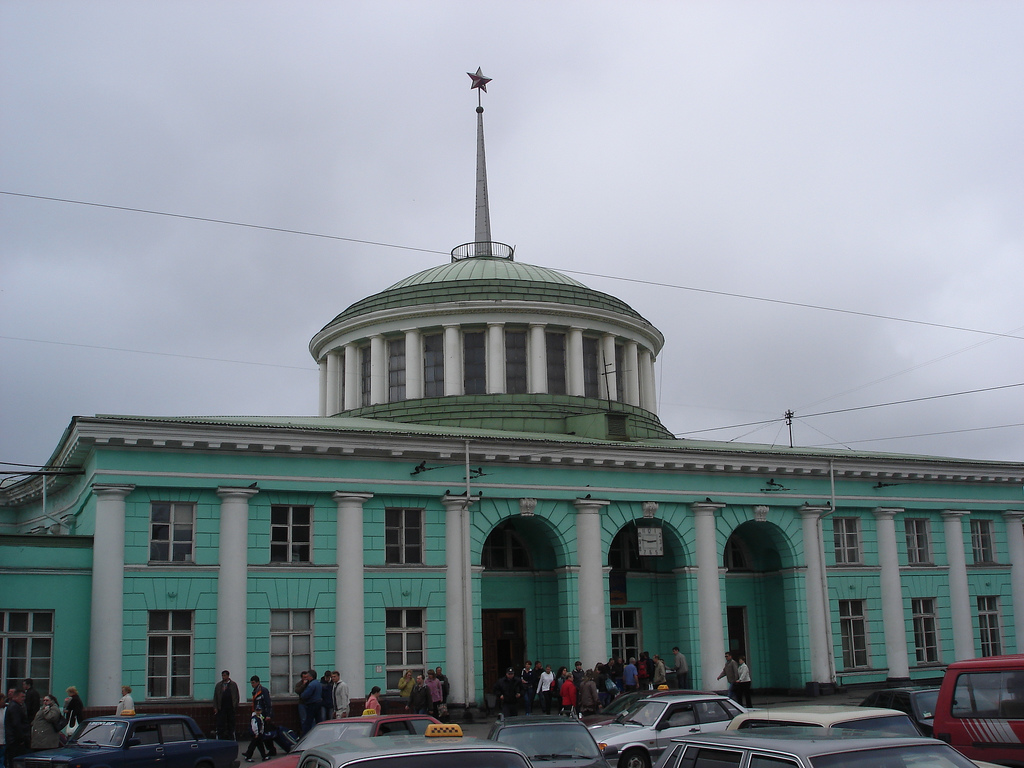
The Murmansk rail station, where "My Beloved Arctic" is played

The song is played in the main Murmansk railroad station to signal the departure of trains. The Society of Russian Authors, the body charged with protecting intellectual property rights, filed a request for clarification of whether October Railway Corporation had paid for the right to use the song. The matter was settled amicably, with the composer (Vladimir Popov) stating that he was just glad that his song had found a second life at the station.
