= Natalya Agapyeva =

Natalya Nikolayevna Agapyeva (or Agapyeva-Zakharova; 3 September 1883 – 25 December 1956) was an artist who worked in the Russian Empire and later the Soviet Union.

== Life ==
She was born on 3 September 1883 in Taganrog, Russian Empire. Her father, Nikolai Fyodorovich Agapiev, worked as a teacher. She studied at Tiflis Art College (now Tbilisi State Academy of Arts), graduating in 1906.

She studied at the Moscow School of Painting, Sculpture and Architecture, and was a founding member of the "Moscow Salon" in 1910, along with some of her former fellow students They gave their first exhibition in February 1911, and folded in 1918. During the civil war, N. Agapyeva made orders to supply the fronts with posters, slogans, cliches, and took an initiative role in organizing the Moscow Municipal Repository of Works of Art.

In 1918, N. Agapyeva with her husband, artist Ivan Ivanovich Zakharov (1885-1969), took an active role in the decoration of Moscow to celebrate the first anniversary of the October Revolution. These were the painting of a large panel adorning the building of the Metropol Hotel, the design of stalls, and the outline of costumes for the national carnival. N. Agapyeva performed many fascinating portraits of writers, scientists, military commanders; left a series of drawings devoted to children, portraits of L. N. Tolstoy, A. P. Chekhov, V. O. Klyuchevsky, O. S. Chernyshevskaya, sketches for the picture “Karl Marx and his family”. Her portraits of Russian municipal figures are fascinating - K. E. Voroshilova, S. Ordzhonikidze, M. I. Kalinin.

The last exhibition of N. Agapieva, after her death, was completed in December 1970 at the Central House of Writers.

She died in Moscow, aged 73.
