= Holland Heineken House =

Place where people meet during the Olympics

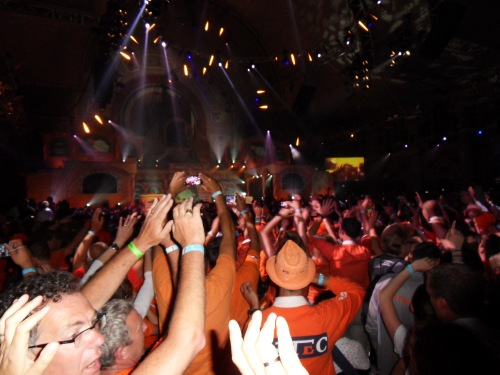
The dance floor of the 2012 Holland Heineken House in Alexandra Palace

The Holland Heineken House is a temporary meeting place for Dutch supporters, athletes and other followers at the Summer Olympics and Winter Olympics. There has been a Holland Heineken House at all the Olympic Games since 1992 in Barcelona until 2020, organized by Heineken and NOC*NSF. Due to changes in Dutch Olympic Team policy towards alcohol, the official name is now TeamNL House.

The name Holland Heineken House was chosen due to the alliteration and for the international appearance, despite the incorrect naming of the country involved. Created with the purpose of having a place for Dutch athletes to meet fans, it was later expanded into a meeting place for supporters as well as a base of operations for NOC*NSF, companies and the media.

== History ==
Holland Heineken House came about during the 1992 Summer Olympics in Barcelona, Spain as a place in a big tent for athletes and supporters of the Dutch Olympic team. It was created by Frank van den Wall Bake who noted that athletes were unable to leave the Olympic Village at the 1988 Summer Olympics in Seoul, South Korea and felt it was not a relaxing environment. It was officially supported by Heineken after they became sponsors of the Dutch Olympic Committee and after van den Wall Bake approached them. In the 1996 Summer Olympics in Atlanta, United States, Holland Heineken House was based in a hotel and it became a tradition for Dutch Olympic medal winners to return to Holland Heineken House shortly afterwards to celebrate. Originally, entry to Holland Heineken House would be via password of the Dutch language words of "Scheveningen" or "kwartje".

During the 2012 Summer Olympics in London, United Kingdom, the 2012 Holland Heineken House was based in Alexandra Palace and gained international attention and popularity for its party atmosphere. As a result, the Dutch Olympic Committee stopped the password system and made 6,500 tickets available to the public to purchase per day. In the 2014 Winter Olympics in Sochi, Russia, the King of the Netherlands, King Willem-Alexander visited Holland Heineken House and invited the President of Russia Vladimir Putin to join for a drink. Due to the COVID-19 pandemic, there were no Holland Heineken Houses at the Tokyo, Japan 2020 Summer Olympics nor in the Beijing, China 2022 Winter Olympics.

In the 2020s, Holland Heineken House received criticism from STAP due to them believing the name associated sporting success with alcohol consumption. As a result, in 2023, the Dutch Olympic Committee announced that for future Olympics, Holland Heineken House would no longer be used as the formal name for the official Dutch Olympic house. Instead, it would be given the title of TeamNL House from the 2024 Summer Olympics in Paris, France onwards.

== Editions ==
Year	Olympic City	Summer/Winter	Location	Ref.
1992	Barcelona	Summer	A tent at the Port of Barcelona	
1994	Lillehammer	Winter		
1996	Atlanta	Summer	Fourth level of a hotel	
1998	Nagano	Winter		
2000	Sydney	Summer	On the quay of the Australian National Maritime Museum	
2002	Salt Lake City	Winter	Clubhouse of the West Ridge Golf Course	
2004	Athens	Summer		
2006	Turin	Winter	Sports complex of the University of Turin	
2008	Beijing	Summer		
2010	Vancouver	Winter	Minoru Arenas	
2012	London	Summer	Alexandra Palace	
2014	Sochi	Winter	Azimut Hotel Resort	
2016	Rio de Janeiro	Summer	Clube Monte Líbano	
2018	Pyeongchang	Winter	LaKai Sandpine, Gangneung	
2024	Paris	Summer	Parc de la Villette	
2026	Milan Cortina	Winter	Superstudio Più, Milan	
