= Mogilnoye =

Lake in Murmansk Oblast, Russia

Lake Mogilnoye
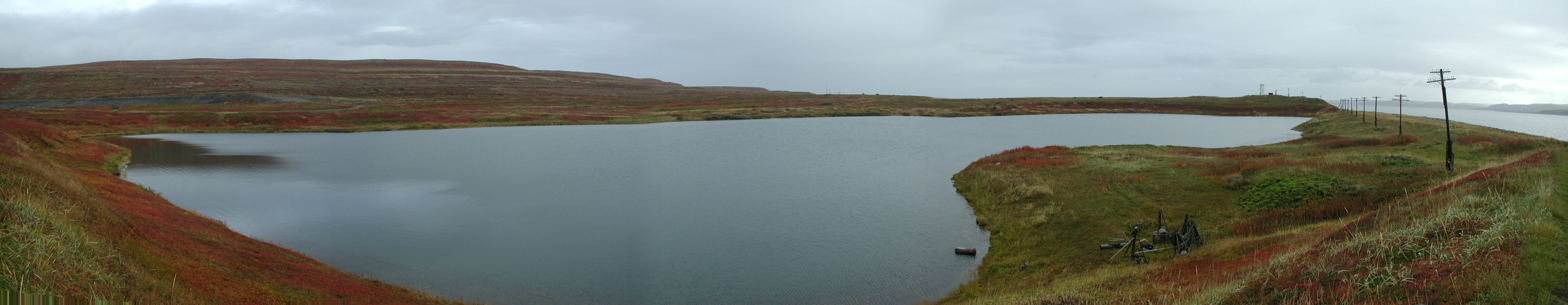

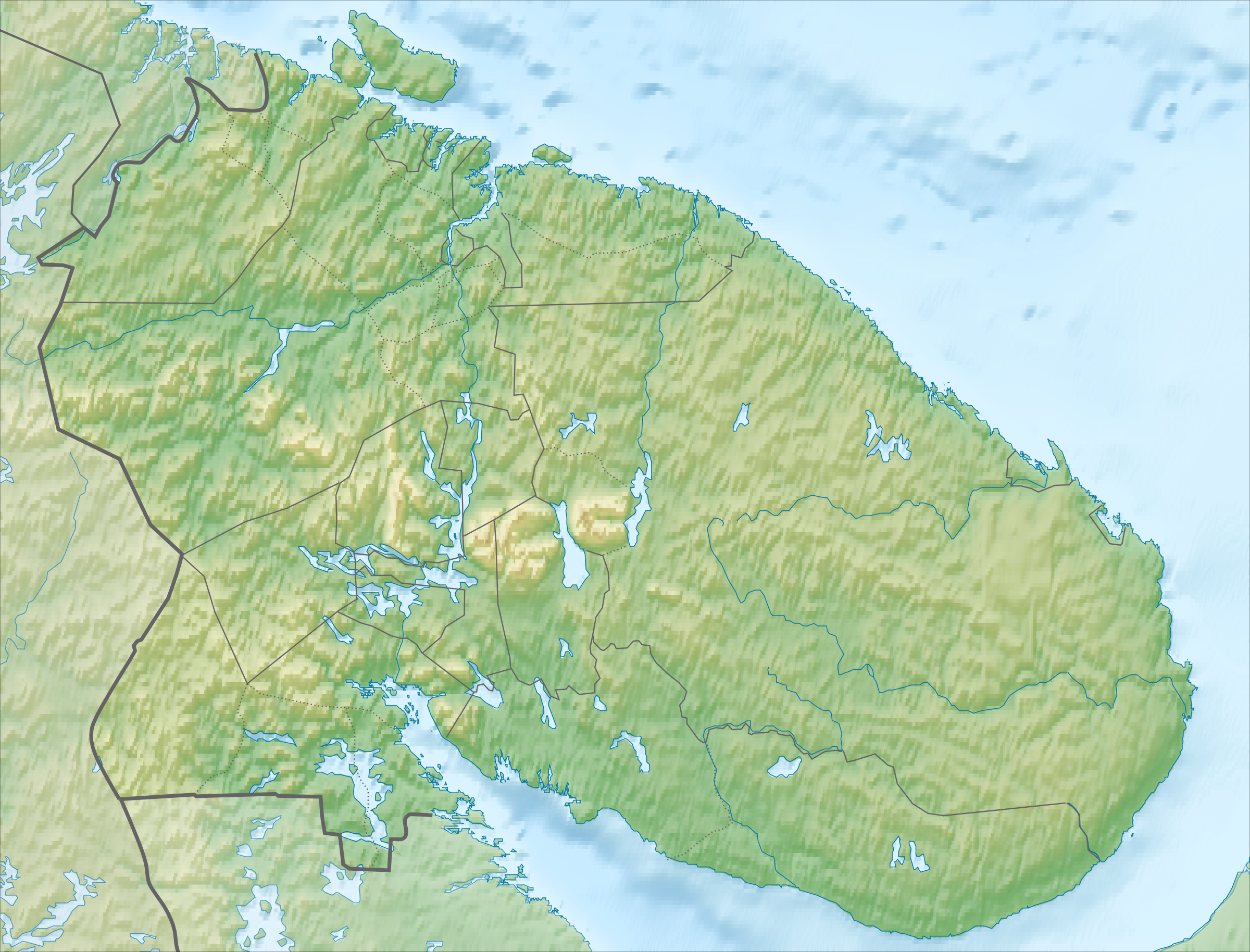
- Location within Murmansk Oblast
- Location: Kildin Island, Murmansk Oblast
- Coordinates: 69°19′11″N 34°20′55″E
- Basin countries: Russia
- Max. length: 0.56 km (0.35 mi)
- Max. width: 0.28 km (0.17 mi)
- Surface area: 0.09 km^{2} (0.035 sq mi)
- Max. depth: 17 m (56 ft)

Lake Mogilnoye (Russian: Могильное озеро) is a small salt/fresh-water lake on the Kildin Island, Murmansk Oblast, Russia near Kildin Strait. The name literally means 'tomb lake, sepulchral lake' in Russian, and refers to the destruction and plundering being done by British troops to the area during the Finnish War in 1809.
