= Alyosha Monument, Murmansk =

Memorial statue in Murmansk, Murmansk Oblast, Russia

Defenders of the Soviet Arctic during the Great Patriotic War
- Alyosha of Murmansk
- Interactive map of Defenders of the Soviet Arctic during the Great Patriotic War
- Location: Murmansk, Russia
- Coordinates: 68°59′35″N 33°04′18″E
- Designer: I. A. Pokrovsky (architect); I. D. Brodsky (sculptor)
- Type: large statue
- Height: 35.5 metres (116 ft)
- Opening date: October 19, 1974

To the Defenders of the Soviet Arctic during the Great Patriotic War (Russian: Защитникам Советского Заполярья в годы Великой Отечественной войны), commonly called Alyosha (Russian: 'Алёша'; Alyosha is an affectionate diminutive form of the name Aleksey) is a monument in Murmansk, Russia to Soviet soldiers, sailors, and airmen of World War II (called, in Russia, the Great Patriotic War).

== Description ==
The statue is of a soldier in a greatcoat with a submachine gun slung over his shoulder. The height of the pedestal is 7 metres (23 ft); the statue is 35.5 metres (116 ft) tall. It is the second-tallest statue in Russia, after The Motherland Calls in Volgograd. The weight of the statue, which is hollow, is over 5,000 tons. The soldier faces west, toward the Valley of Glory, where the fiercest fighting of the Arctic Campaign occurred when the German invaders were turned back from the approaches to Murmansk at the Zapadnaya Litsa River in July 1941.

In front of the monument is a platform of natural black stone bearing an eternal flame. A little higher and closer to the statue is a sloping triangular pyramid. According to the designers, this pyramid represents a flag at half-mast as a sign of mourning for the fallen soldiers of the red banner. Next to the statue is a stele of polished granite with this inscription:

Defenders of the Arctic – the warriors of the 14th Army, 19th Army, Red Banner Northern Fleet, 7th Air Force, 82nd and 100th Border Troops, and Partisan groups "Soviet Moormen", "Bolshevik Arctic", "Polarmen", "Stalinists", and "Bolshevist". We honor their defense of this land!

Slightly to one side of the monument are two anti–aircraft guns. (During the war, anti–aircraft guns were emplaced at the site as part of the air defense of Murmansk.) Built into the foot of the monument are two capsules, one with seawater from the gravesite of the patrol craft Tuman which sank while fighting off three German destroyers, one with earth from the Valley of Glory and from the Verman River front.

A large central staircase leads up to a podium used by speakers during ceremonies at the monument. Completing the complex is a wall built in 2004 with plaques commemorating the other hero cities.

== History ==
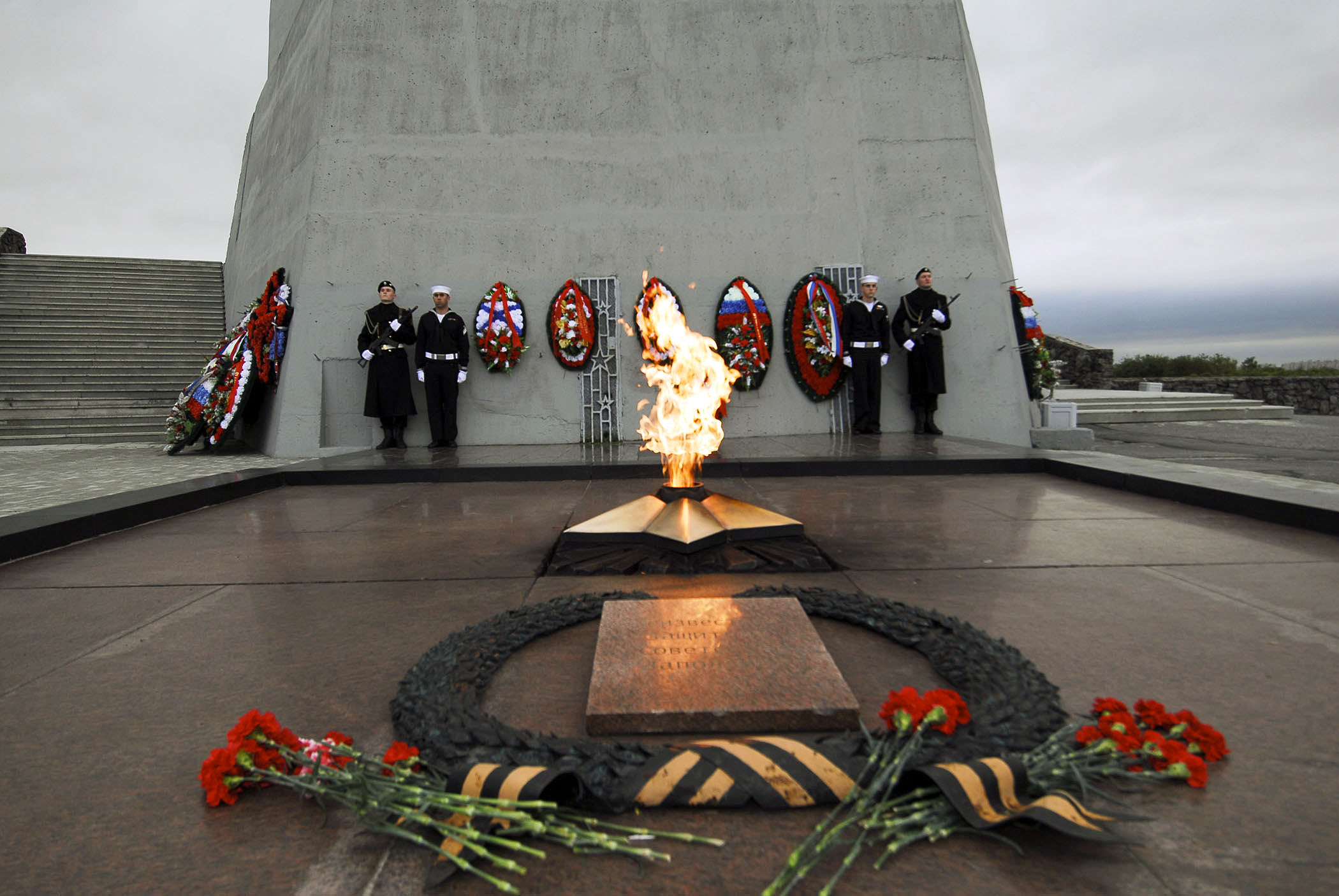
The Eternal Flame and grave of The Unknown Soldier

The first plan was to build the monument at Five Corners, the main square of Murmansk, but it was later decided to build it on a hill overlooking the city and Kola Bay at Cape Green in the Leninsky District. Collection of funds for the project was initiated by a floating workshop collective named "Chisel". Ground was broken on October 17, 1969, and construction began in May 1974. The monument was designed by I. A. Pokrovsky and erected under the supervision of I.D. Brodsky.

The monument was dedicated on the 30th anniversary of the defeat of German forces in the Arctic – October 19, 1974. At the opening ceremony, a column proceeded to the site, with two armored personnel carriers at the head and at the rear a gun carriage with the remains of an Unknown Soldier and the two capsules, one of water and one of earth. Standing on the roads in Kola Bay, the cruiser Murmansk saluted with 30 volleys in honor of the holiday and the opening of the memorial.

On May 9, 1975, the Unknown Soldier was reburied in a solemn ceremony at the eternal flame at the foot of the monument.

In October 2004, the 60th anniversary of the victory of Soviet forces in the Arctic, a memorial plaque and capsule containing earth from the other hero cities was installed at the wall of the hero cities.

== Notes ==
1. The Tuman ("Mist"; Russian: Туман) was sunk on August 4, 1941, at 69°33′06″N 33°40′20″E; Russian naval ships passing over the site dip their flags and sound their horns in commemoration.
