= Hotel Metropol Moscow =

Hotel in Moscow, Russia

- Гостиница «Метрополь»
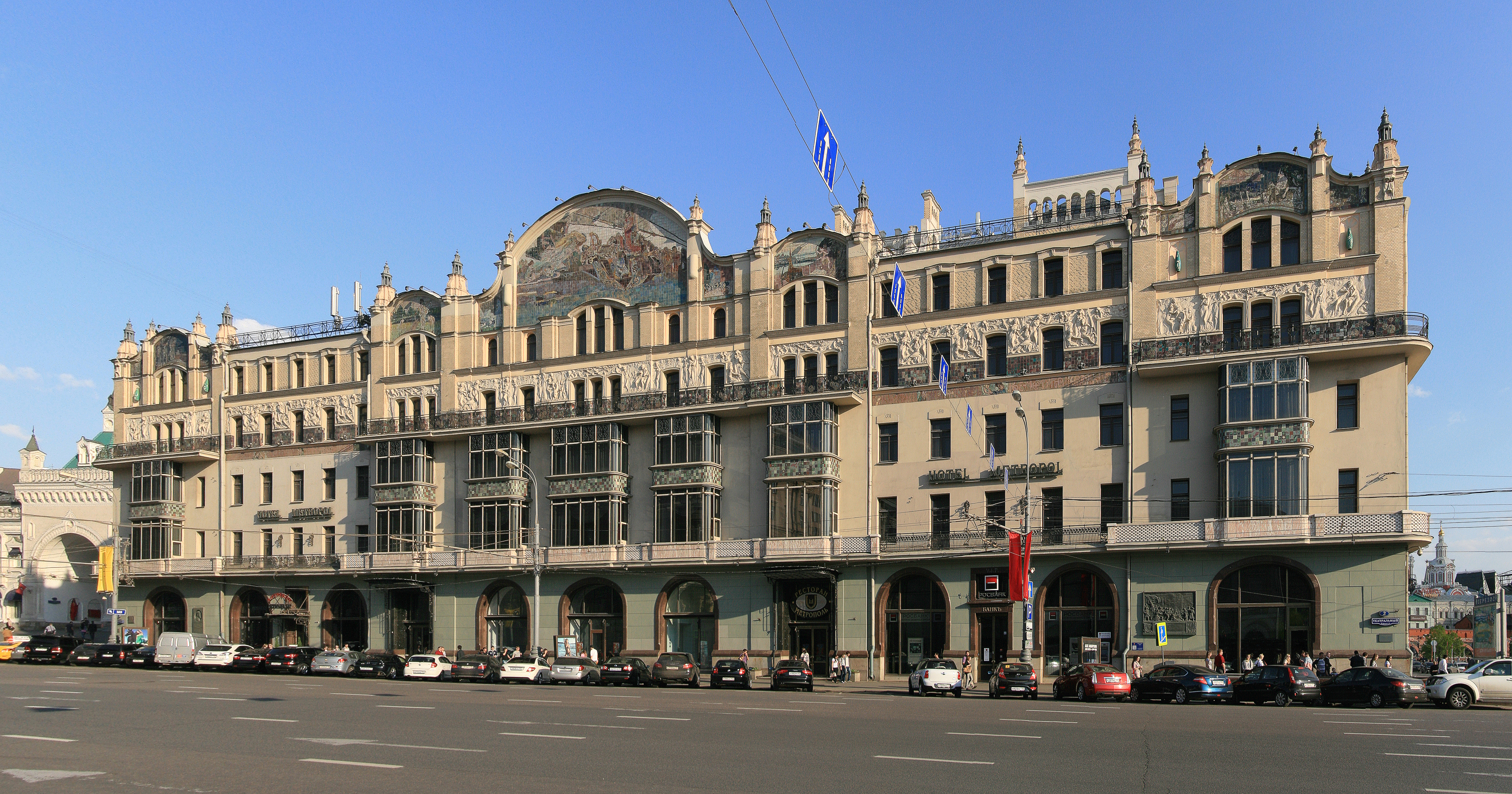
- Main Teatral'nyy Proyezd facade, 2014

- Location within Central Moscow

General information
- Architectural style: Art Nouveau
- Location: Moscow, Russia
- Coordinates: 55°45′30″N 37°37′17″E
- Construction started: 1899
- Completed: 1907
- Client: Petersburg Insurance, Savva Mamontov
- Owner: Alexander Klyachin

Technical details
- Structural system: Reinforced concrete

Design and construction
- Architects: William Walcot, Lev Kekushev, Vladimir Shukhov

The Hotel Metropol Moscow (Note: Also Metropole) (Russian: Метрополь, IPA: [mʲɪtrɐˈpolʲ]) is a historic hotel in the center of Moscow, Russia, built between 1899 and 1905 in the Art Nouveau style. It is the largest extant Moscow hotel built before the Russian Revolution of 1917. Since 2012, the hotel has been owned by Alexander Klyachin, who also is proprietor of the Moscow-based Azimut Hotels chain.

== History ==
In 1898, Savva Mamontov and Petersburg Insurance consolidated a large lot of land around the former Chelyshev Hotel. Mamontov eventually hired Kekushev as a construction manager. Soon, Mamontov was jailed for fraud and the project was taken over by Petersburg Insurance.

In 1901, the topped-out shell burnt down and had to be rebuilt from scratch in reinforced concrete. Kekushev and Walcot hired a constellation of first-rate artists, notably Mikhail Vrubel for the Princess of Dreams mosaic panel, Alexander Golovin for smaller ceramic panels and sculptor Nikolay Andreyev for plaster friezes. The hotel was completed in 1907. However, it is nowhere near Walcot's original design. (Note: Brumfield, fig. 56, compare to actual, fig. 59–60)

A feature of the Metropol is "its lack of any reference to the orders of architecture ... a structural mass shaped without reference to illusionistic systems of support". The rectangular bulk of the Metropol is self-sufficient; it needs no supporting columns. Instead, "Texture and material played a dominant expressive role, exemplified at the Metropole by the progression from an arcade with stone facing on the ground floor to inset windows without decorative frames on the upper floors".

In 1918, the hotel was nationalized by the Bolshevik administration, renamed Second House of Soviets and housed living quarters and offices for the growing Soviet bureaucracy. Eventually in the 1930s it reverted to its original function as a hotel and in 1986–1991 was thoroughly restored by Finnish companies as part of Soviet-Finnish bilateral trade.

Since 2012, the hotel has been owned by Alexander Klyachin, who also is proprietor of the Moscow-based Azimut Hotels chain. As of 2022, the Metropol had 365 rooms, each being different in its shape or decoration.

== Notable guests and media appearances ==
Canadian businessman Aggie Kukulowicz was a hotel resident while brokering hockey's 1972 Summit Series between the Red Machine team and the first Team Canada.

The hotel is the setting of Amor Towles's 2016 novel A Gentleman in Moscow.

During wartime, from 1941 to 1945, the hotel housed American and British war correspondents posted to Moscow to cover the Eastern Front. The story of their battles with the Soviet censor is told in the non-fiction book by Alan Philps, The Red Hotel: The Untold Story of Stalin's Disinformation War.

== Gallery ==
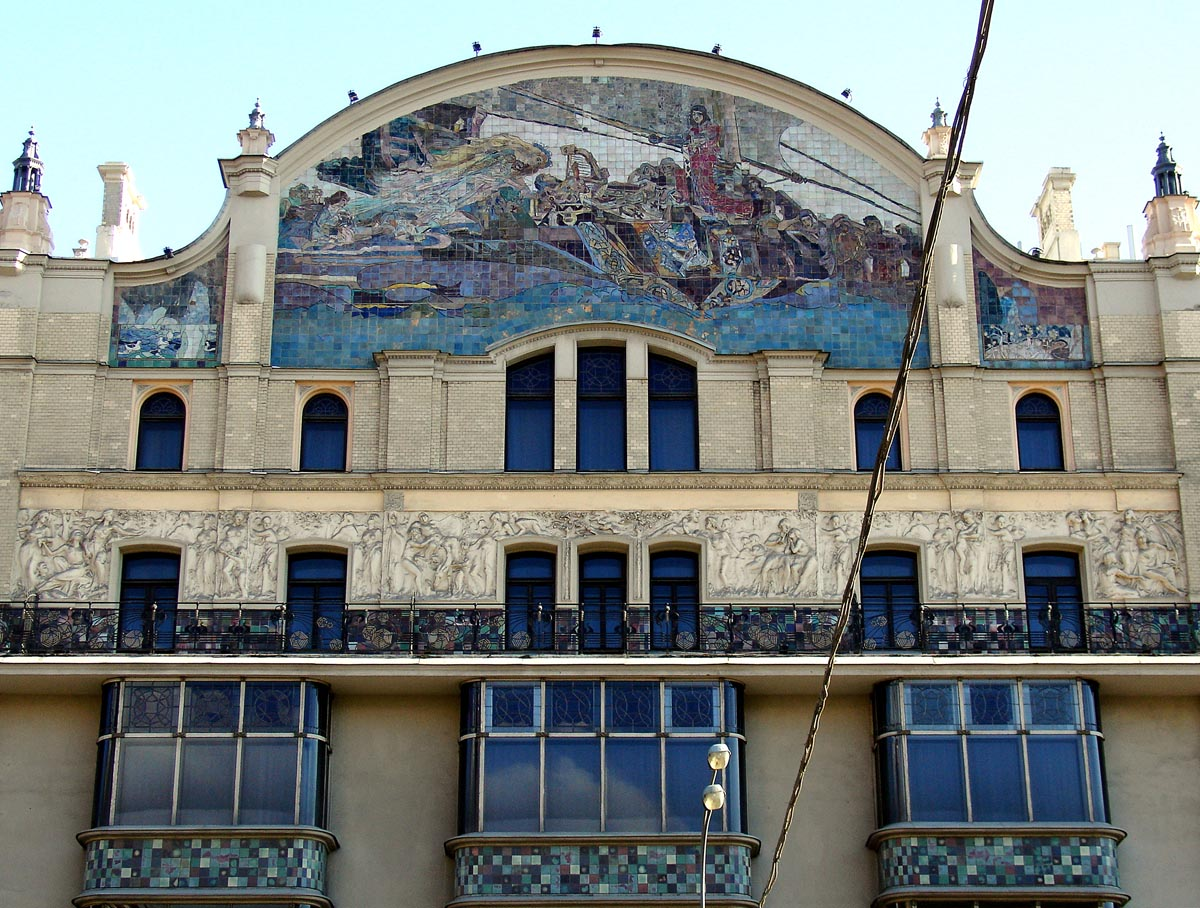
Princess of Dreams

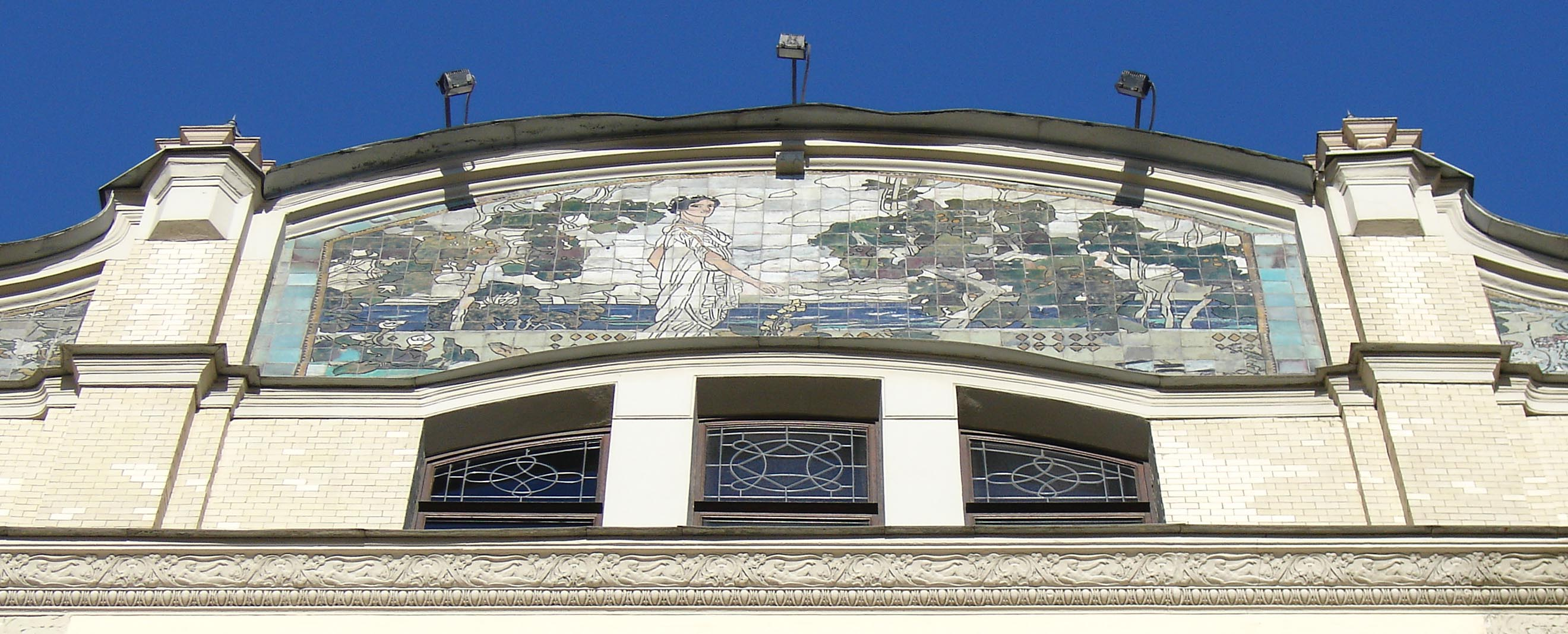
Southern corner

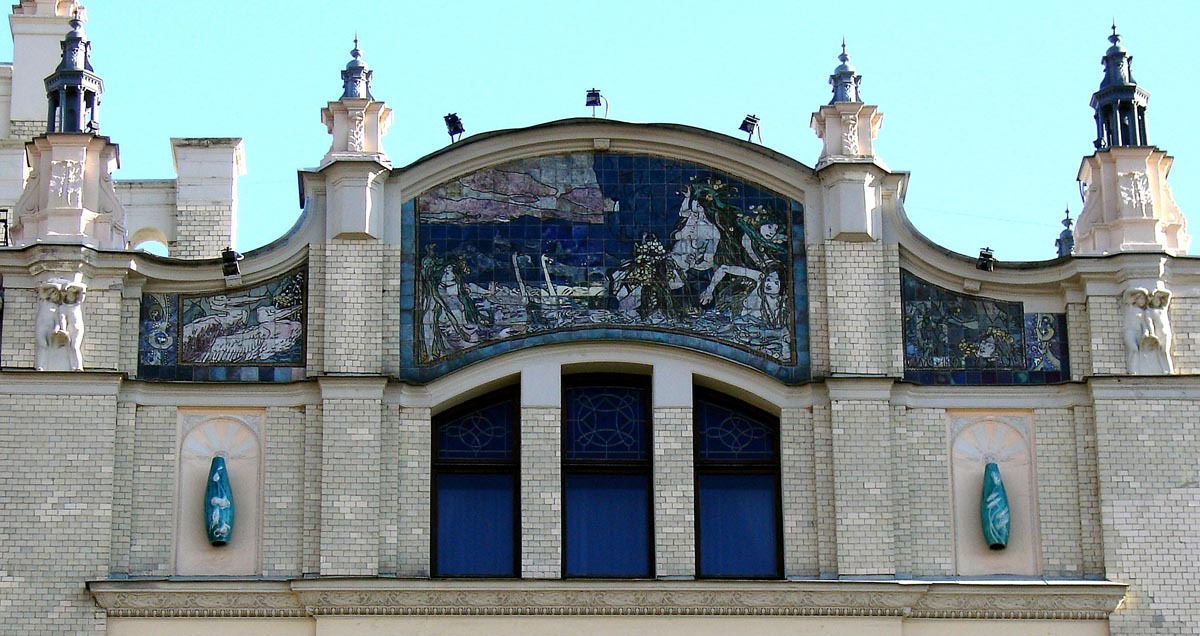
Western corner

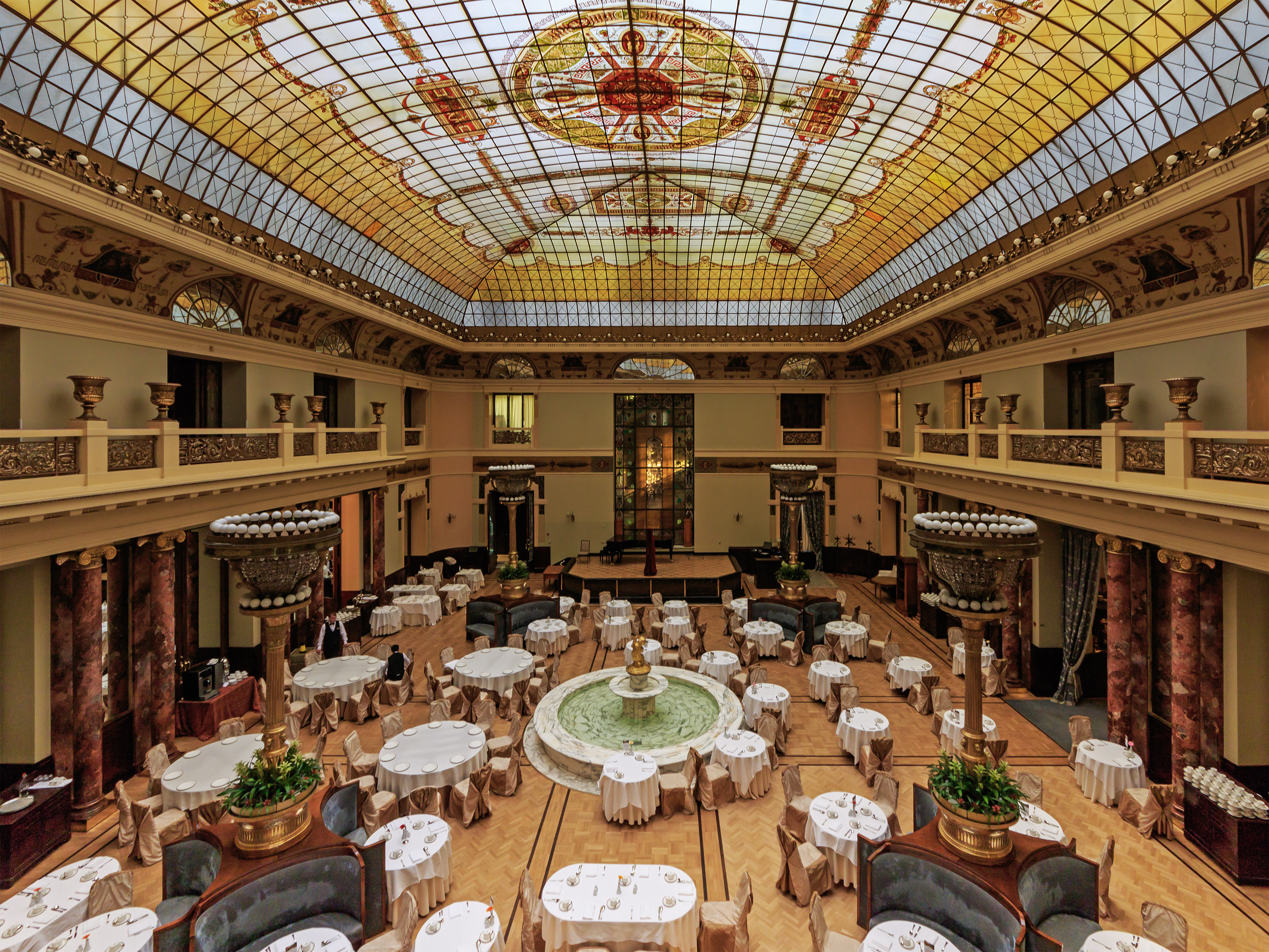
Grand Hall of the restaurant

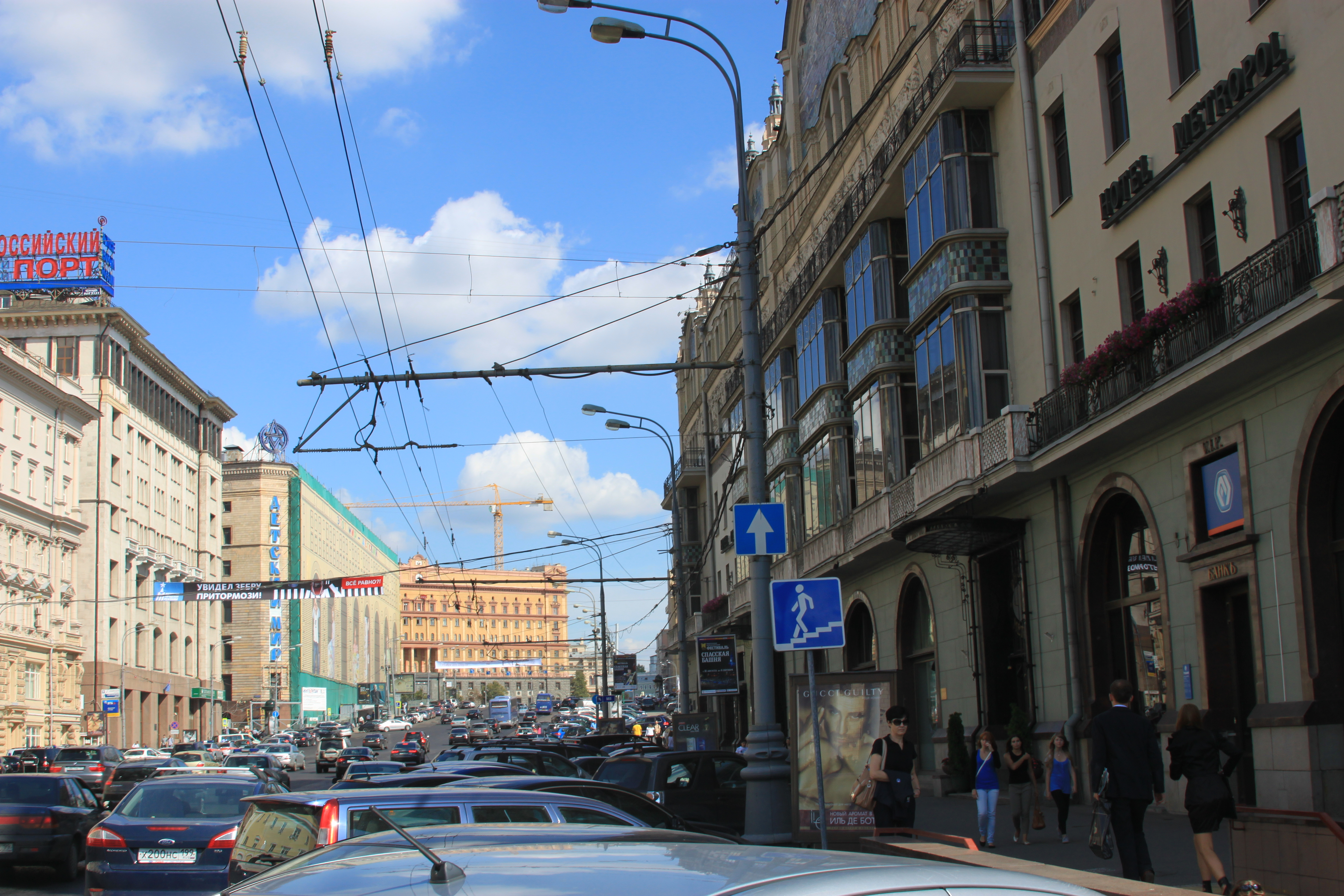
Northern facade (Teatral`nyy proyezd), 2011

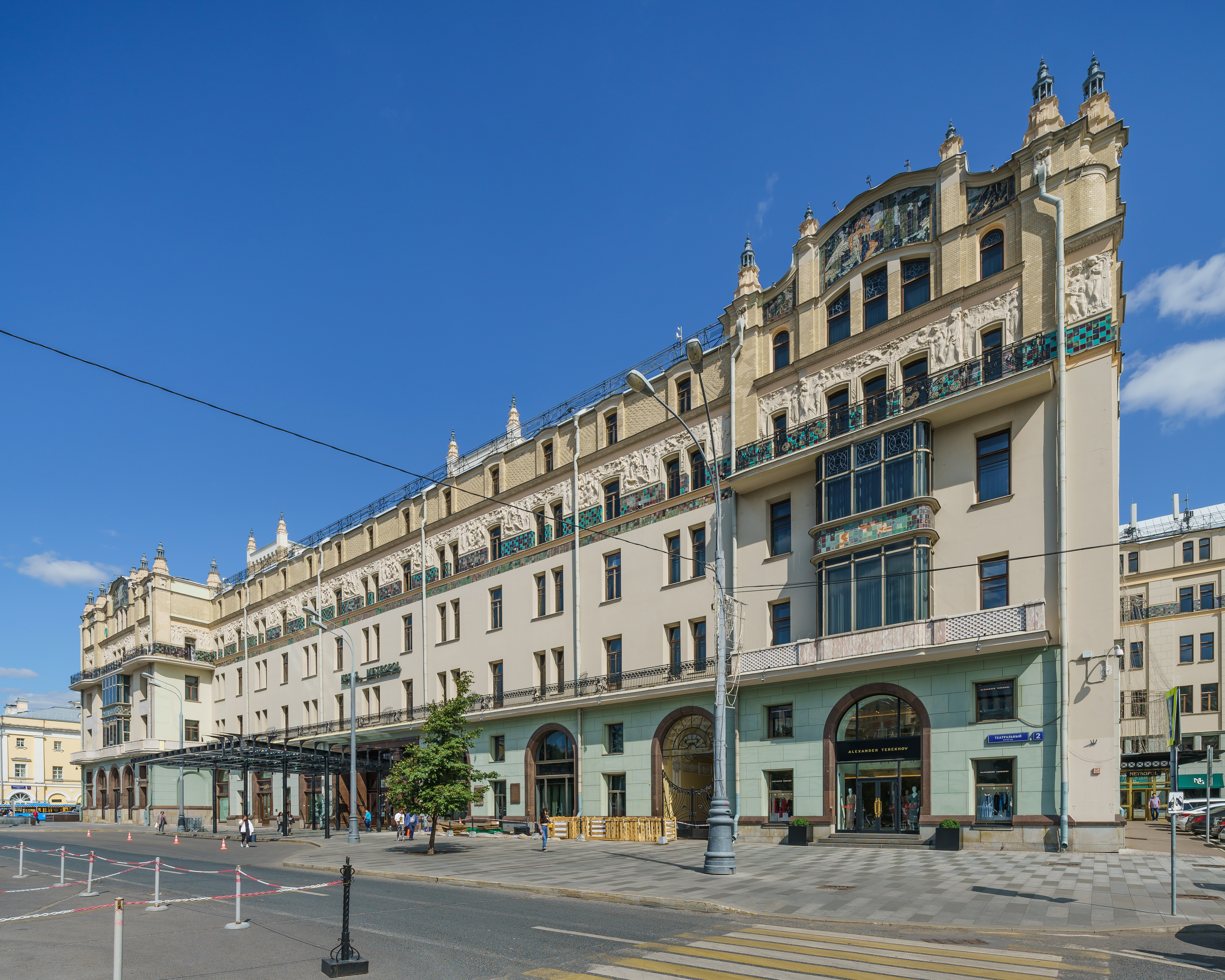
Southern facade, 2018
