= 2012 Holland Heineken House =

Dutch meeting place during the 2012 Summer Olympics in London

Coordinates: 51°35′37.65″N 0°7′48.47″W

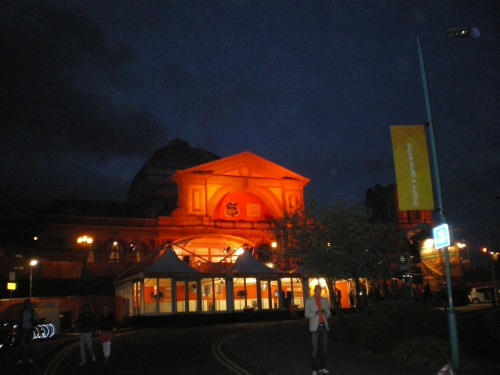
The front of the 2012 Holland Heinken House in Alexandra Palace

The 2012 Holland Heineken House was the Dutch meeting place for supporters, athletes and other followers during the 2012 Summer Olympics in London, organized by Heineken and NOC*NSF. It was the 11th edition of the Holland Heineken House since 1982. The 2012 Holland Heineken House opened its doors on the day of the opening ceremony on 27 July 2012 and closed on the day of the closing ceremony, 12 August 2012. Due to the expected numbers of visitors, tickets were sold in advance. With about six thousand visitors per day, over hundred thousand visitors the venue during the Games.

== The layout ==
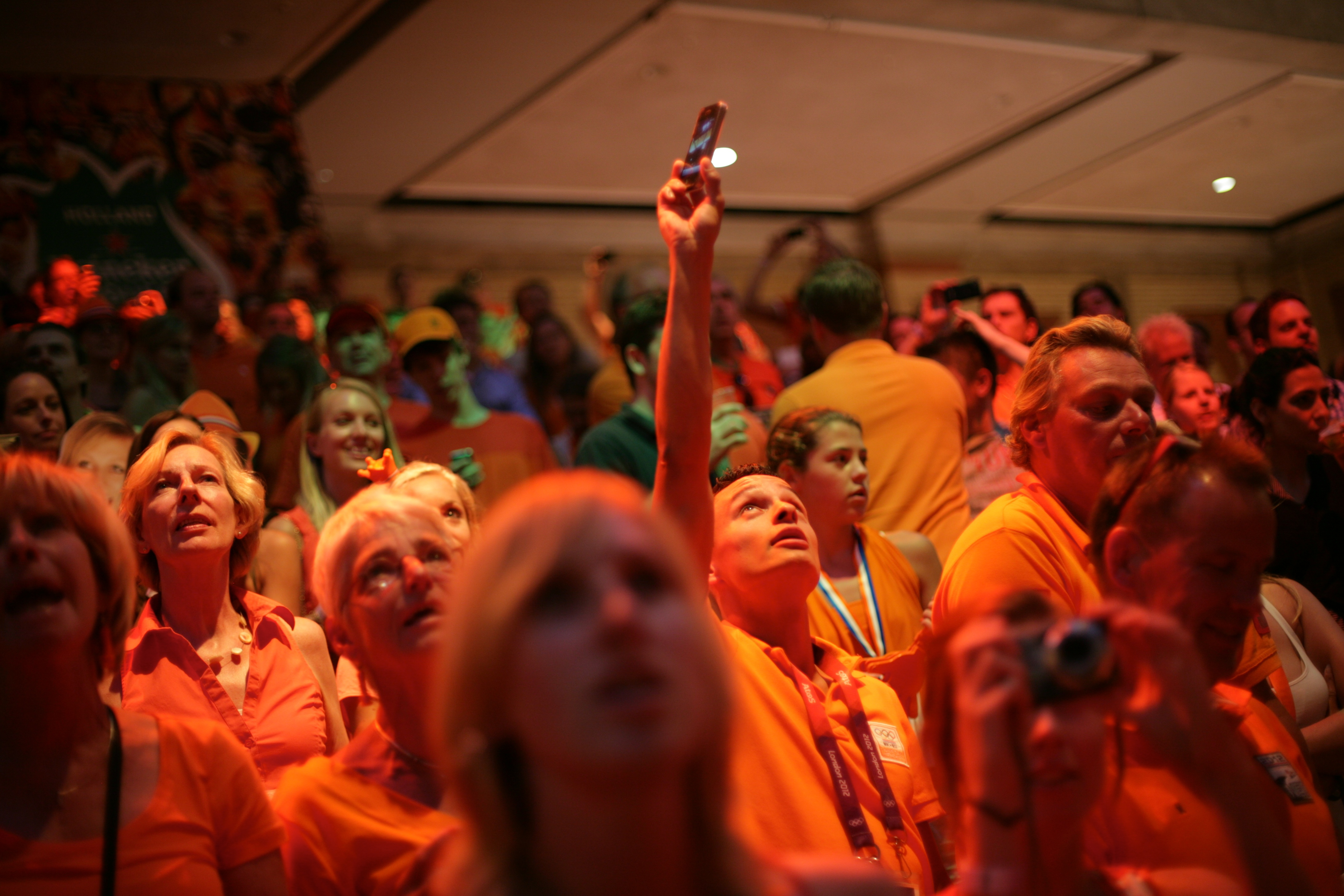
People watching an Olympic event at the Holland Heineken House

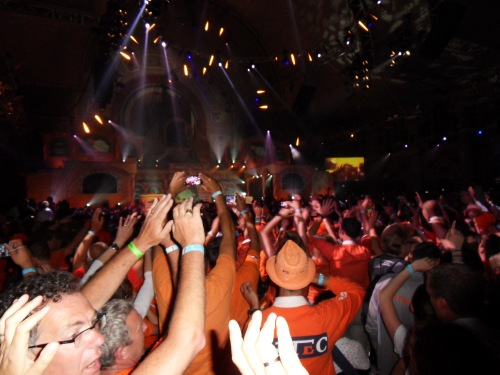
Party in the big hall

The 2012 Holland Heineken House had various shops, restaurants, reception rooms for sponsors and athletes, media facilities and a NOC*NSF information desk. During the day visitors could watch Olympic events on big screens and play different sports. There was a big hall for medal celebrations and performances of different artists during the night. The overall design and executions was created by Gielissen Interiors & Exhibitions.

== Medal celebrations ==
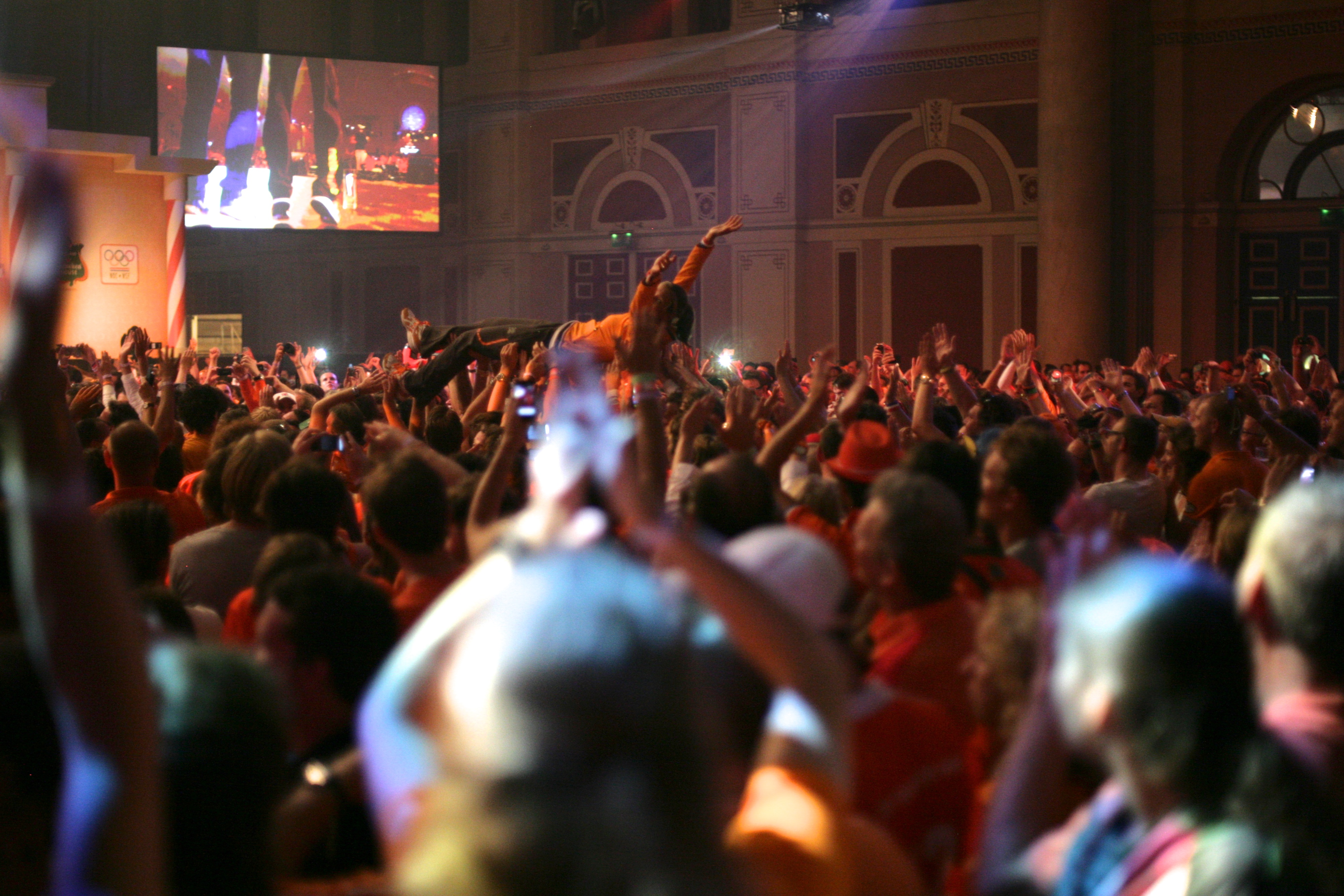
Medal celebration of Lobke Berkhout and Lisa Westerhof

Dutch medalist together with their coaches were honoured on the day they won on medal or later when they had to participate in other events. Because Marianne Vos won her gold medal in the road cycling women's road race due to the team performance of the Dutch team, her teammates Ellen van Dijk, Annemiek van Vleuten, Loes Gunnewijk were honoured as well.

Date	Medal	Name(s)	Coach	Sport	Event	Ref
1 August	Gold	Marianne Vos; Ellen van Dijk; Annemiek van Vleuten; Loes Gunnewijk	Johan Lammerts	Cycling	Women's road race	
1 August	Bronze	Edith Bosch	Chris de Korte	Judo	Women's 70 kg	
2 August	Bronze	Chantal Achterberg; Claudia Belderbos; Carline Bouw; Sytske de Groot; Annemiek de Haan; Nienke Kingma; Anne Schellekens (cox); Roline Repelaer van Driel; Jacobine Veenhoven		Rowing	Women's eight	
2 August	Bronze	Henk Grol	Maarten Arens	Judo	Men's 100 kg	
4 August	Gold	Ranomi Kromowidjojo	Jacco Verhaeren	Swimming	Women's 100 m freestyle	
4 August	Gold	Ranomi Kromowidjojo	Jacco Verhaeren	Swimming	Women's 50 m freestyle	
4 August	Silver	Inge Dekker; Femke Heemskerk; Ranomi Kromowidjojo; Marleen Veldhuis; Hinkelien Schreuder	Jacco Verhaeren	Swimming	Women's 4 × 100 m freestyle relay	
4 August	Bronze	Marleen Veldhuis	Jacco Verhaeren	Swimming	Women's 50 m freestyle	
6 August	Silver	Marit Bouwmeester		Sailing	Women's Laser Radial class	
6 August	Silver	Marc Houtzager; Gerco Schröder; Maikel van der Vleuten; Jur Vrieling	Rob Ehrens	Equestrian	Team jumping	
7 August	Gold	Epke Zonderland	Daniel Knibbeler	Gymnastics	Men's horizontal bar	
7 August	Bronze	Teun Mulder		Cycling	Men's keirin	
8 August	Gold	Dorian van Rijsselberghe		Sailing	Men's sailboard	
8 August	Silver	Gerco Schröder	Rob Ehrens	Equestrian	Individual jumping	
9 August	Silver	Adelinde Cornelissen	Johan Hamminga	Equestrian	Individual dressage	
9 August	Bronze	Adelinde Cornelissen; Edward Gal; Anky van Grunsven		Equestrian	Team dressage	
10 August	Gold	Netherlands women's national field hockey team: Marilyn Agliotti; Naomi van As; Merel de Blaeij; Carlien Dirkse van den Heuvel; Margot van Geffen; Maartje Goderie; Eva de Goede; Ellen Hoog; Kelly Jonker; Kim Lammers; Caia van Maasakker; Kitty van Male; Maartje Paumen; Sophie Polkamp; Joyce Sombroek; Lidewij Welten	Max Caldas	Field hockey	Women's tournament	
10 August	Bronze	Laura Smulders		Cycling	Women's BMX	
11 August	Silver	Netherlands men's national field hockey team: Sander Baart; Billy Bakker; Marcel Balkestein; Floris Evers; Rogier Hofman; Robert van der Horst; Tim Jenniskens; Wouter Jolie; Robbert Kemperman; Teun de Nooijer; Jaap Stockmann; Valentin Verga; Klaas Vermeulen; Bob de Voogd; Mink van der Weerden; Roderick Weusthof; Sander de Wijn	Paul van Ass	Field hockey	Men's tournament	
11 August	Bronze	Lobke Berkhout; Lisa Westerhof	Jacco Koops	Sailing	Women's 470 class	
