= Soviet patrol boat Tuman =

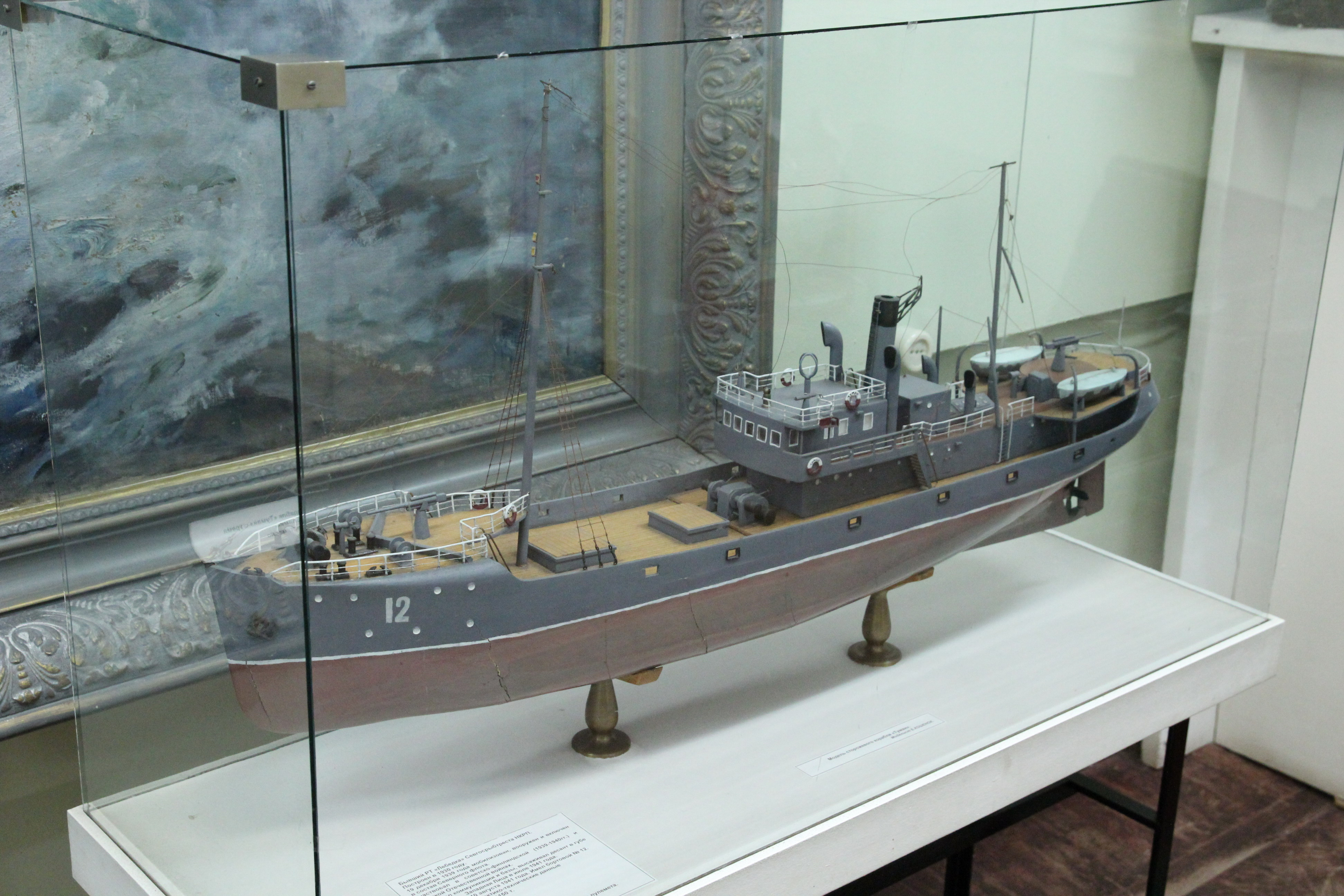

History

Soviet Union
- Name: Tuman
- Builder: Danzig
- Launched: 1931
- Acquired: 19 October 1939
- Fate: Sunk, 10 August 1941

General characteristics
- Type: Naval trawler
- Displacement: 1,218 long tons (1,238 t)
- Length: 55 m (180 ft)
- Beam: 9 m (30 ft)
- Speed: 9 knots (17 km/h; 10 mph)
- Range: 4,500 nmi (8,300 km; 5,200 mi)
- Armament: 2 × 45 mm (1.8 in) dual purpose guns; 2 × light 7.62 mm machine guns; Depth charges

Tuman (Russian: Туман, meaning Mist) was a Soviet patrol boat that served in the Barents Sea during World War II. She is best known for her final engagement, battling with German destroyers off of Kildin Island in 1941.

== Ship history ==
Tuman was built in 1931 in the Free City of Danzig (now Gdańsk) as a seagoing fishing trawler, with a displacement of 1,218 tons, a length of 55 metres (180 ft) and width of 9 metres (30 ft), a speed of 9 knots (17 km/h; 10 mph), and a range of 4,500 miles (7,200 km).

On October 19, 1939, just before the commencement of the Soviet-Finnish War, the trawler was called into the navy as DC-10 (Patrol Ship Number 10). In a list dated March 4, 1940, it is listed in the category of escort ships. It was provided with an armament of two dual purpose 45 mm guns, two light 7.62 mm caliber machine guns, and depth charges.

=== Sinking ===
On August 10, 1941, the ship was on patrol under the command of Lieutenant L. Shestakov on the line Tsyp-Navolok—Kildin Island when it encountered three German destroyers (Z4 Richard Beitzen, Z10 Hans Lody, and Z16 Friedrich Eckoldt). The Tuman reported this sighting to Northern Fleet Command, which fulfilled the ship's mission instructions.

Tuman then laid down a smoke screen and began evasive action. The German destroyers, which had a massive superiority in armament, closed to within 5 nautical miles (9.3 km; 5.8 mi) and begin hitting the craft. Tuman sustained eleven direct hits from 5-inch (130 mm) shells and the captain and commissar were killed. Damage to the aft gun prevented Tuman from returning fire. The German fire shot the ship's flag from the mast, but a wounded sailor (K. D. Semenov) and the senior radio operator (V. K. Blinov) raised it again.

Opening late due to poor interoperability, fire from Soviet shore batteries drove off the German destroyers (Z4 Richard Beitzen suffered some damage by near miss). Together with the smoke screen, this allowed the lives of 37 of the 52 crew members to be saved from Tuman, which sank. That evening, surviving crewmen were presented with tributes from the workers of Murmansk.

To this day, Russian naval vessels passing Kildin Island dip their flags and sound a long blast on their horns in tribute when passing over the site where Tuman sank, at position 69°33′06″N 33°40′20″E, about 15 miles (24 km) northwest of Kildin. A capsule of seawater from this point was embedded in the giant statue Defenders of the Soviet Arctic during the Great Patriotic War.
