= Lobke Berkhout =

Dutch sailor (born 1980)

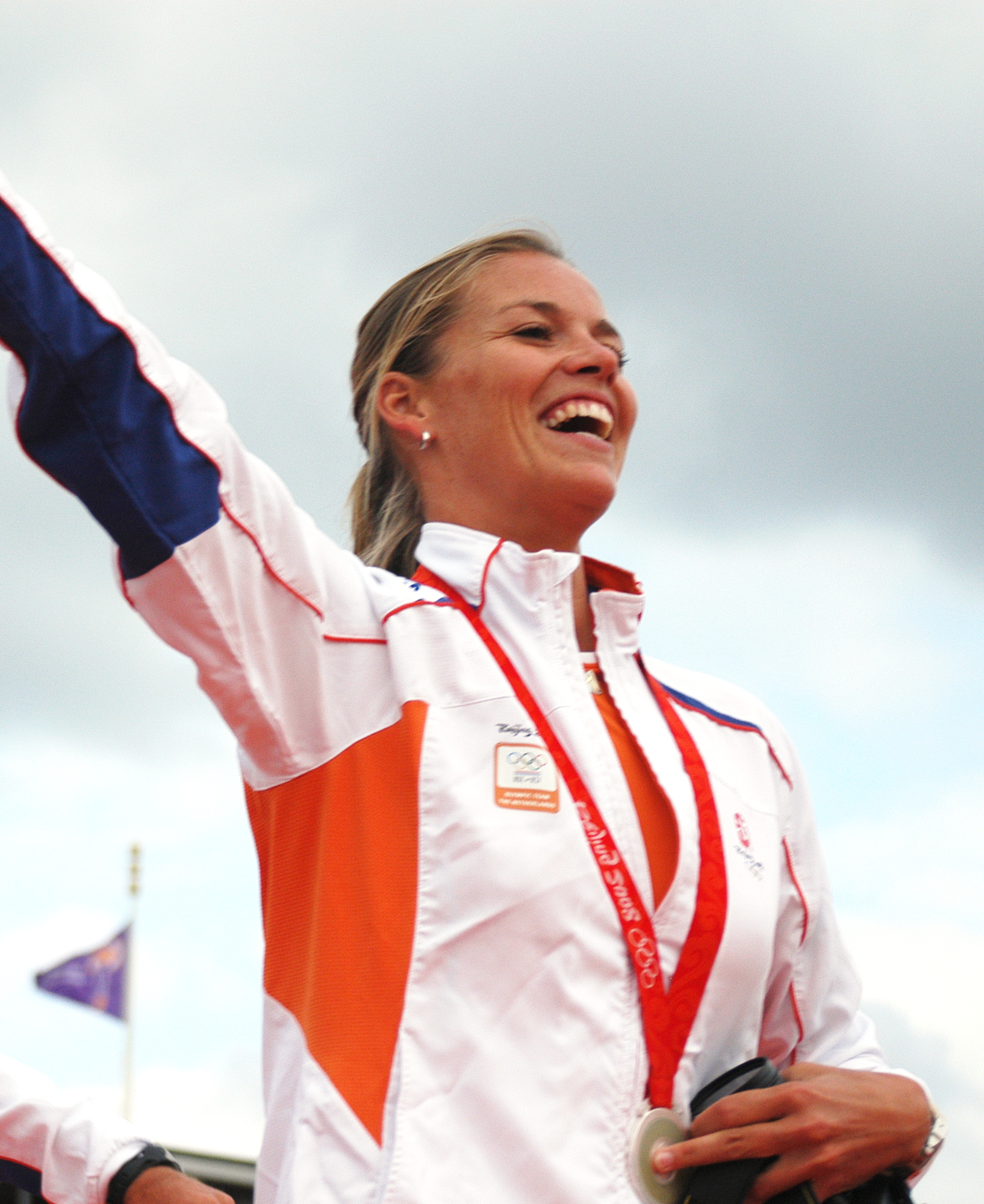

Personal information
- Born: 11 November 1980 (age 45) Amsterdam
- Height: 1.83 m (6.0 ft)

Sailing career
- Sport: Sailing
- Club: Watersportvereniging Hoorn
- Class: 470
Medal record
Women's sailing
Representing the Netherlands
Olympic Games
Silver medal – second place	2008 Beijing	470
Bronze medal – third place	2012 London	470
World Championships
Gold medal – first place	2005 San Francisco	470
Gold medal – first place	2006 Rizhao	470
Gold medal – first place	2007 Cascais	470
Gold medal – first place	2009 Copenhagen	470
Gold medal – first place	2010 The Hague	470
Silver medal – second place	2017 Helsinki	Match racing
Silver medal – second place	2021 Vilamoura	470
Bronze medal – third place	2012 Barcelona	470
Bronze medal – third place	2016 Sheboygan	Match racing
European Championships
Bronze medal – third place	2019 Sanremo	470

Lobke Berkhout (born 11 November 1980 in Amsterdam) is a sailor from the Netherlands who represented her country at the 2008 Summer Olympics in Qingdao. With helmsman Marcelien de Koning, Berkhout took the silver medal as crew in the Women's 470. Berkhout returned as crew member to the 2012 Olympic regatta's in Weymouth in the 470. With helmsman Lisa Westerhof, Berkhout took the bronze medal in the Women's 470.

== Awards ==
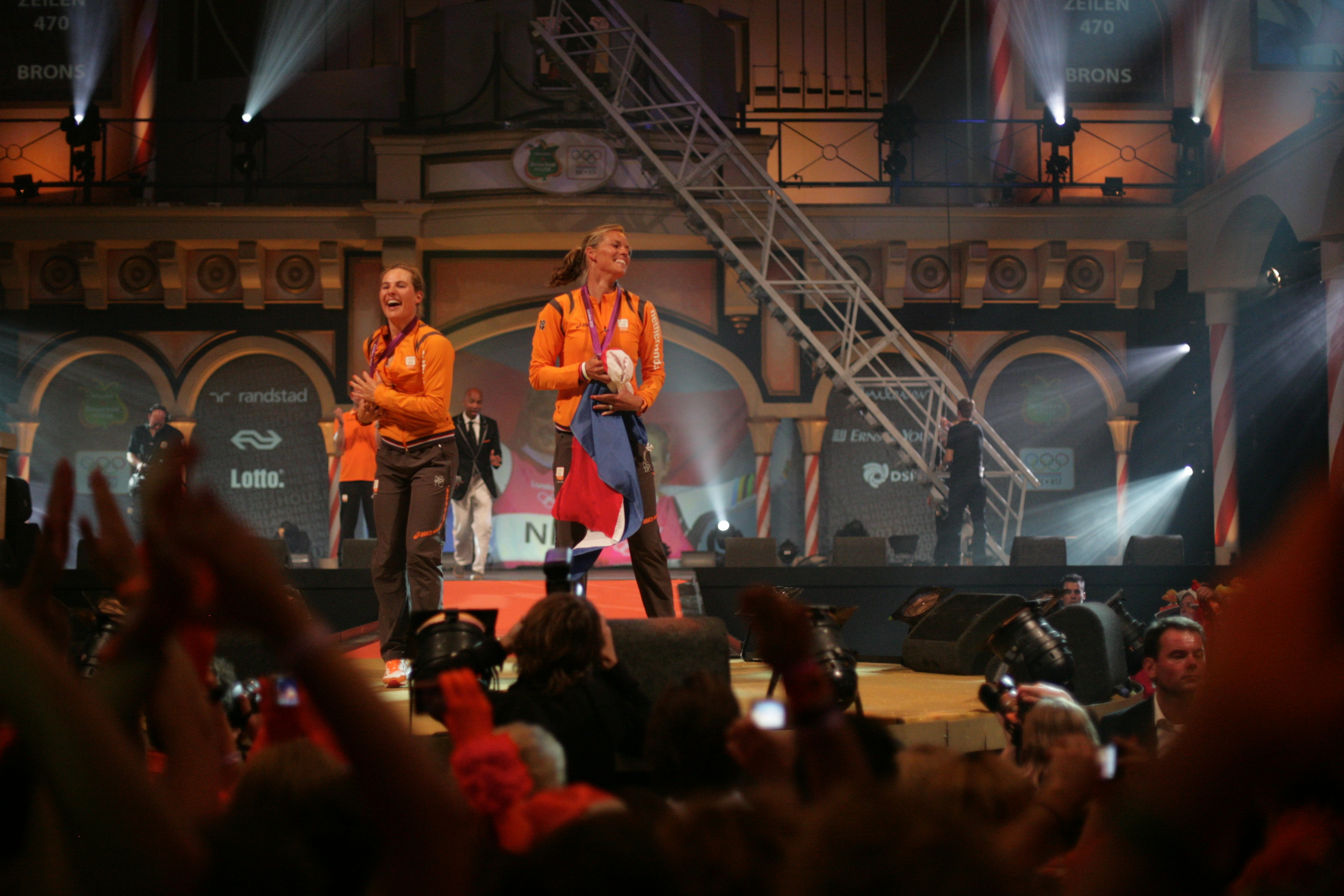
Olympic medal celebration in the 2012 Holland Heineken House

- Order of Orange-Nassau

Awards
Preceded by Dutch male relay team 4x100m freestyle (Van den Hoogenband/Kenkhuis/Zastrow/Zwering; 2004	Sports team of Nederland; 2005; With: Marcelien de Koning	Succeeded by Netherlands women's national field hockey team 2006
