= Vostochny Kildin =

Vostochny Kildin Восточный Кильдин
- Inhabited locality
- Interactive map of Vostochny Kildin
- Location of Vostochny Kildin Vostochny Kildin (Murmansk Oblast)
- Coordinates: 69°19′N 34°20′E
- Country: Russia
- Federal subject: Murmansk Oblast
- Administrative district: Kolsky District
- Territorial okrugSelsoviet: Teribersky Territorial Okrug
- Elevation: 1 m (3.3 ft)

Population (2010 Census)
  - Total: 4
  - Estimate (2021): 0 (−100%)

Municipal status
  - Municipal district: Kolsky Municipal District
  - Urban settlement: Teriberka Rural Settlement
- Time zone: UTC+3 (MSK)
- Postal code: 184600
- Dialing code: +7 81553
- OKTMO ID: 47605405116

Vostochny Kildin (Russian: Восточный Кильдин) is a rural locality (an inhabited locality) in Teribersky Territorial Okrug of Kolsky District of Murmansk Oblast, Russia, located on Kildin Island beyond the Arctic Circle at a height of 1 meter (3 ft 3 in) above sea level. Population: 4 (2010 Census).
