= Kildin Strait =

Strait of Barents Sea, Russia

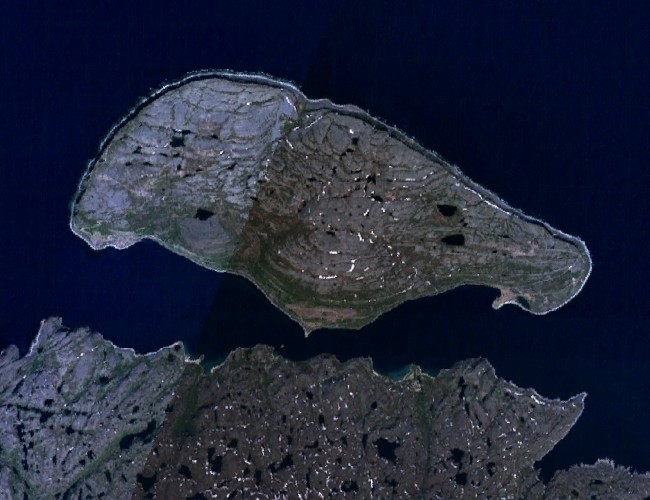
Kildin Strait from space

Kildin Strait (Russian: Кильдинский пролив) is a strait, located at 69°18′20″N 34°09′40″E, separating Kildin Island and the Kola Peninsula, Russia.
