= Kildin Island =

Island in Barents Sea, Russia

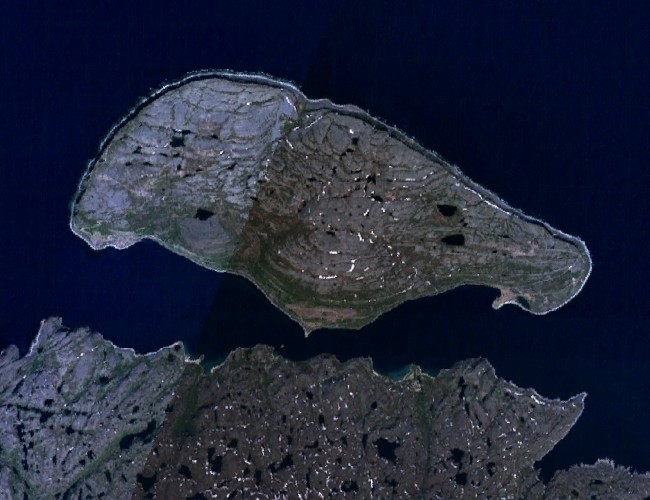
Satellite photo of the island.

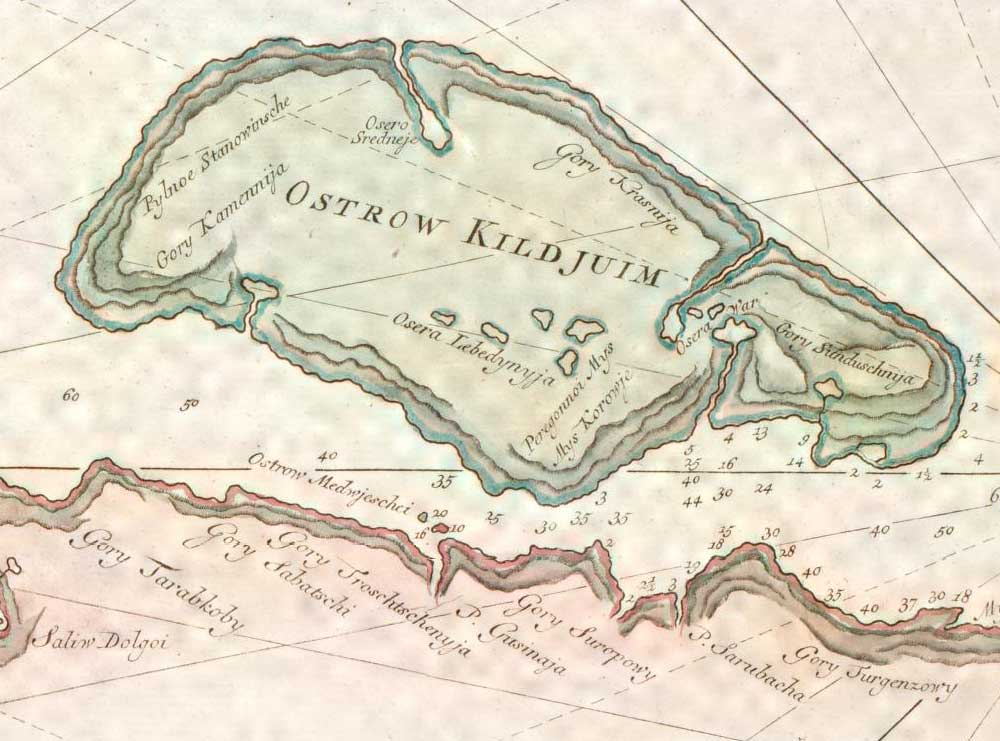
1790 map of the island

Kildin (also Kilduin; Russian: Кильди́н, North Sami: Gieldasuolu) is a small Russian island in the Barents Sea, off the Russian shore and about 120 km from Norway. Administratively, Kildin belongs to the Murmansk Oblast of the Russian Federation.

Kildin Island is a plateau, up to 900 feet in elevation; it drops sharply to the sea on the north. Great granite masses rise from the sea and are carved into broad terraces. In the interior there is a relict lake, Lake Mogil'noe (or Molginoye), which is separated from Kildin Strait by an isthmus through which seawater filters that replenishes the lake. The brackish lake holds a unique species of cod (Gadus morhua kildinensis) that has adapted to it.

The island is 15 km (9.3 mi) long by 5 km (3.1 mi) and 1 km (0.62 mi) wide at the widest part. Kildin Strait, which separates it from the mainland, is 15 km (9.3 mi) long and varies in width from 2 km (1.2 mi) to about 1 km (0.62 mi). The water is deep so anchorage is only possible near the shore. The only safe anchorage is in Monastery Bay, at the South East end of the island. The bay gets its name from a fortified monastery that used to stand there but that the British destroyed in 1809 and of which no trace remains.

According to the Norwegian Organization for the Protection of the Environment, there is a deposit of expended reactors from Soviet nuclear submarines on the island.

== Coastal missile system ==
Since its establishment on the island in 1957, the regiment operated the S-2 cruise missiles and later the newer generation P-35. The missile complex was operated from underground facilities and was aimed at approaching enemy surface vessels. During World War 2 on the island were many tunnels, underground facilities for commanders, and storages. Back in the Soviet times, transport communication on the island was organized by the military. In the past, four vessels connected the island with the mainland. Nowadays, only one of them passes by, sailing from Murmansk to Ostrovnoy. The military left the island in 1995.

== Lighthouses ==
There are three lighthouses on the island.

1. Kildinskiy Zapadnny (West Kildinsky) is built near the southwest corner of the island and marks the western entrance to the strait between the island and the mainland.
2. Kildinskiy Severnny (North Kildinsky) is built on the north side of the island, about 25 km (15 mi) east of the entrance to Kola Bay.
3. Kildinskiy Vostochny (East Kildinsky) is on the southeastern side of the island, near the settlement of Vostochny Kildin.

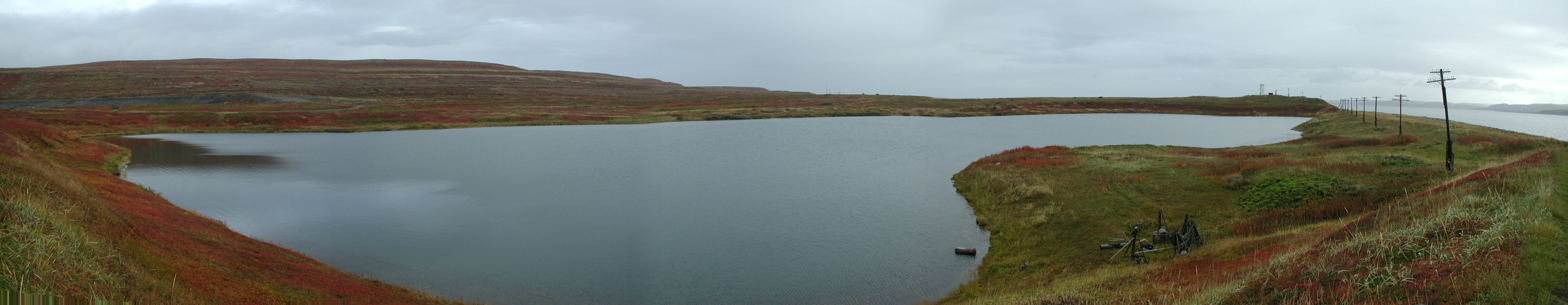
Lake Mogil'noe on Kildin Island

== Notable incidents ==
- 2003, 21 August: The Russian submarine K-159 sank off Kildin Island while she was being towed to a scrap yard. She sank about 3 nautical miles (5.6 km) northwest of the island, near the entrance to Kola Bay. The sinking, which claimed the lives of nine of her ten crew, occurred during a gale.
- 1992, 11 February: In the submarine incident off Kildin Island, USS Baton Rouge, a Los Angeles class nuclear attack submarine, collided with the Russian Sierra-class submarine K-276 Kostroma some 4.7 miles (7.6 km) from the line that connects Tsypnavolok Cape and Kildin Island. The US Navy stated that the collision occurred more than 12 miles (19 km) from the shore, which is international waters. However, Russia uses a different set of rules for defining the boundary between territorial and international waters, and maintains that the collision took place within Russian territorial waters. Fortunately, the accident caused no injuries or deaths on either vessel.
- 1943, 24 July: The British merchant vessel SS Llandaff (4,825 grt) was part of a three-vessel convoy bringing timber from the White Sea to Kola Inlet on behalf of the Russians. The vessels were some 20 miles (32 km) northeast of the island when a flight of four Messerschmitt Bf 109 fighters attacked Llandaff, hitting her aft and starting a fire. HMS Britomart helped to get the fire under control. Llandaff eventually entered harbour; there were no casualties.
- 1943, 2 January: While part of Convoy JW51B from Loch Ewe for Murmansk with military cargo, the American freighter Ballot (6,131gt) ran aground on the island in fog and was a total loss. Her crew abandoned her on 13 January. In 2018 the Russian Northern Fleet's Search and Rescue unit's Ivan Shvets diving boat and the Elbrus multi-purpose logistics support vessel retrieved from 60m deep water one of the M3 Lee tanks that was part of Ballot's cargo.
- 1941, 4 August: Three German destroyers overwhelmed and sank the Soviet patrol boat Tuman about 15 miles (24 km) northwest of Kildin. The incident became famous, a capsule of seawater from this point was embedded in the giant statue Defenders of the Soviet Arctic during the Great Patriotic War, and to this day Russian naval vessels passing by this point (69°33′06″N 33°40′20″E) dip their flags and sound a long blast on their horns in memory.
- 1917, 22 October: The German submarine U-46 fired a torpedo that sank Zillah (3,788grt), which was en route from Archangel, Russia, to Lerwick, Shetland Islands, with a cargo of timber. The attack occurred without warning 25 miles (40 km) northeast of Kildin Island; the entire crew of 18 men died.
- From the late 1860s and until 1930, some Kola Norwegians emigrated to Kildin from Finnmark.
- 1809, 6 June: During the Anglo-Russian War (1807–1812), boats from HMS Nyaden attacked a fort on the island, capturing it and 22 or 23 vessels that were sheltering under its protection. The landing party took away some of the guns of the fort or threw them in the river.
- 1599, 19–26 May: The Danish King Christian IV visited Kildin on his first expedition as a King of Denmark–Norway. The expedition, which set off from Kronborg, Elsinore, on 19 April, is in detail described in the diaries of Sivert Grubbe.
- 1594, 23–29 June: The Dutch explorer, Willem Barentsz visited Kildin Island on his first voyage while on his way to Novaya Zemlya.

== See also ==
- Kildin class - The island gave its name to the Kildin-class of Soviet destroyers
- Submarine incident off Kildin Island - A 1992 collision between a US and a Russian nuclear submarine
