= Azimut Hotels =

Travel and holiday companies of Russia

AZIMUT Hotels
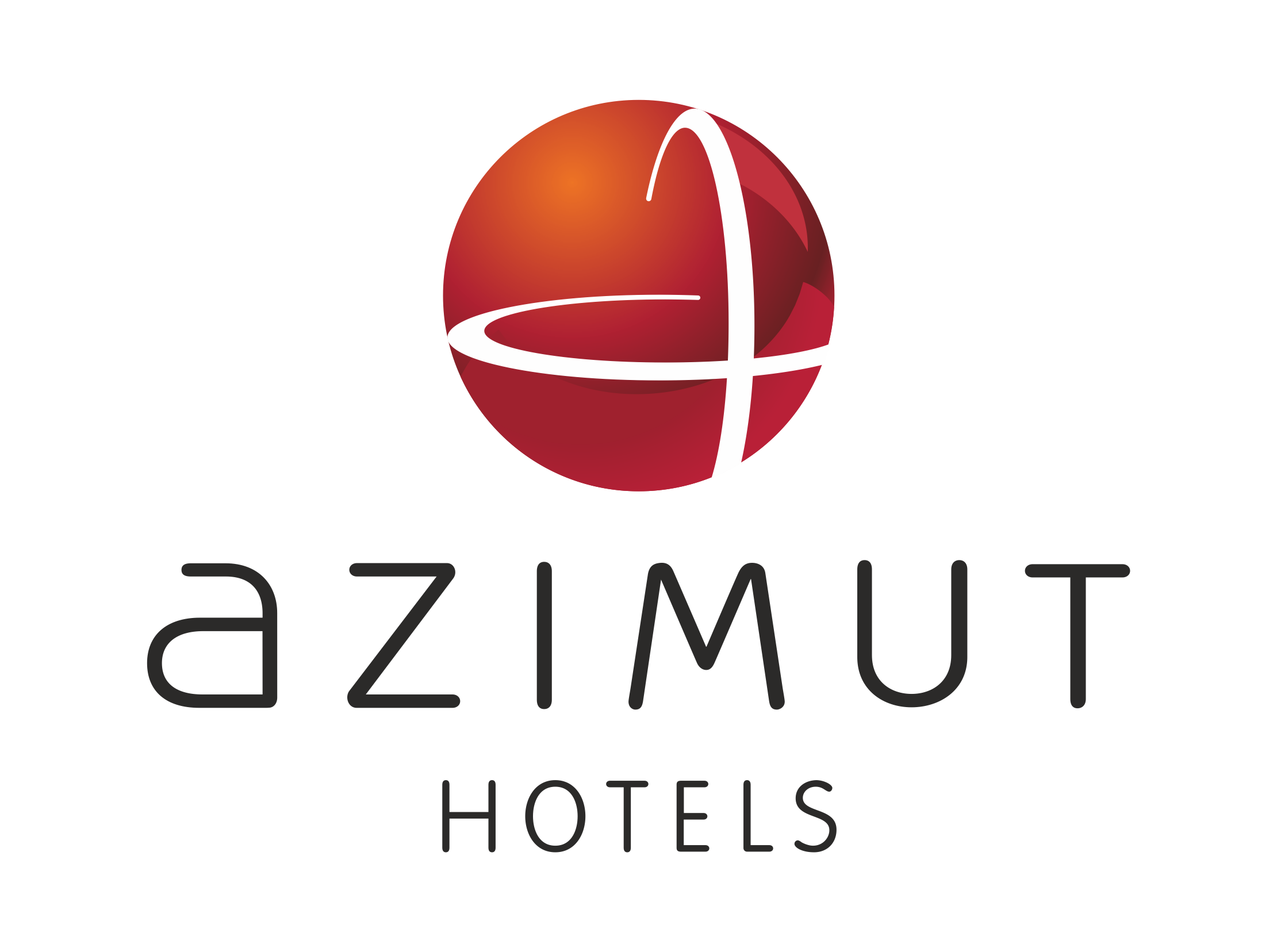
- Industry: Hospitality
- Founded: 2004
- Founder: Alexander Klyachin
- Headquarters: 18/1, Olympiyskiy avenue, Moscow, Russia, 129110 (mailing address)
- Number of locations: 39 hotels
- Area served: Europe, Asia-Pacific
- Key people: Walter Neumann, Director
- Products: Hotels
- Services: Hotel management
- Revenue: ₽3.5 billion (2012)
- Net income: 180,000,000 Russian ruble (2020)
- Number of employees: more than 2000
- Website: azimuthotels.com

Azimut Hotels
- Chinese: 阿兹姆特连锁酒店
Transcriptions
Standard Mandarin
- Hanyu Pinyin: Āzīmǔtè Liánsuǒ Jiǔdiàn

Azimut Hotels is a privately held Russian company that manages an international hotel chain. By mid-2021, it operated 40 hotels in Russia and Europe. According to Hotels Magazine, in 2015 the company was among the largest hotel networks worldwide. From 2008 to 2013 the company engaged in several significant acquisitions, partnerships and hotel purchases that significantly increased their overall number of properties.

== Overview ==
The hotels are located in Russia, Germany, Austria, and Israel. Some of them are of private ownership, and some are based on a management contract or long-term lease contracts. The company was established in 2004 by Alexander Klyachin. In 2015, the hotel chain consisted of 24 hotels of the category 3 and 4 stars; the total number of Azimut rooms is about 8 thousand.

The hotel chain was rated in 2015 as amongst the largest hotel networks worldwide, according to Hotels Magazine. As of 2018, the hotel chain counted 29 properties across three countries.

== Business model ==
=== Renovation of Soviet hotels ===
In Russia, the business model of Azimut Hotels is based on the reconstruction and modernization of hotels built during the Soviet period. For example, it renovated the hotel National in Samara, which was renamed Azimut Hotel Samara since 2006 and is on renovation since 2014. There has been also the modernization of hotels in Ufa, Kostroma, St. Petersburg, Vladivostok and other Russian cities.

=== SMART concept ===
Azimut Hotels developed SMART concept for the hotel rooms. The main idea of the concept is combination of a minimal design in the classic German school of thought, multifunctional furniture and ergonomics. The color scheme of the SMART spaces includes berry tones with darker wood floors and warm eclectic lighting.

=== China Friendly ===
The company joined China Friendly to create a comfortable environment for Chinese tourists. Special conditions for travellers from China include Chinese-speaking staff, Chinese breakfast, information materials and website in Chinese. The first hotels to join the program were Azimut Moscow Olympic Hotel and Azimut Hotel Vladivostok.

== Ownership and management ==
The main shareholder and chairman of the board of directors is Alexander Klyachin. He also has owned since August 2012 the Hotel Metropol Moscow and development company KR Properties.

Since November 2013, the company is headed by Walter Neumann who previously worked for Rocco Forte Hotels as a Director of the St. Petersburg hotels Astoria and Angleterre.

== History ==
In 2004, Alexander Klyachin acquired his first hotels in Samara, Kostroma and Ufa. In 2005, the hotel chain expanded with hotels in Saint Petersburg, Vladivostok, Astrakhan and Murmansk.

In 2007, the company had become one of the largest hotel chains in Russia: its turnover amounted to 54 million US dollars with an annual growth rate of 30%. In 2008, the hotels in Germany and Austria were acquired and control over the assets was transferred through management contracts and franchise agreements (for a period of 20–25 years). The European office was located in Berlin.

In 2010, the hotel chain acquired hotels in Novosibirsk, and took over the management contract Voronezh. In 2011, the hotel chain acquired a hotel in Nizhny Novgorod. As at the end of 2012, the company's revenue amounted to 3.5 billion rubles.

Since 2013, the company has controlled the largest hotel complex in Sochi. The Azimut Hotel Sochi was opened in anticipation of the 2014 Winter Olympics in Sochi. At the end of 2013, the hotel chain also acquired the 487 room Azimut Moscow Olympic Hotel, which was renamed from the "Olympic Penta".

In April 2015, the Vienna Delta Hotel joined Azimut Hotels chain. In May 2015, Azimut Hotel Vladivostok, the biggest investment project in the Russians Far East in 2014-2015 and the first SMART hotel in the region, opened after renovation. With 378 modern rooms, it is also the largest hotel in the area. Investment in this project exceeded €20 million. In 2015, Azimut Hotels started cooperation with the countries of Asia-Pacific region. The first step was a Service Voluntary Certification Program China Friendly, Chinese: 友好中国.

The Moscow Hotel 'Belgrad' was bought by the Azimut Hotel chain in 2014. The hotel was closed for renovation in 2016. The hotel was projected in 2016 to be reopened as Azimut Moscow Smolenskaya Hotel.

== History of Hotels under brand Azimut ==
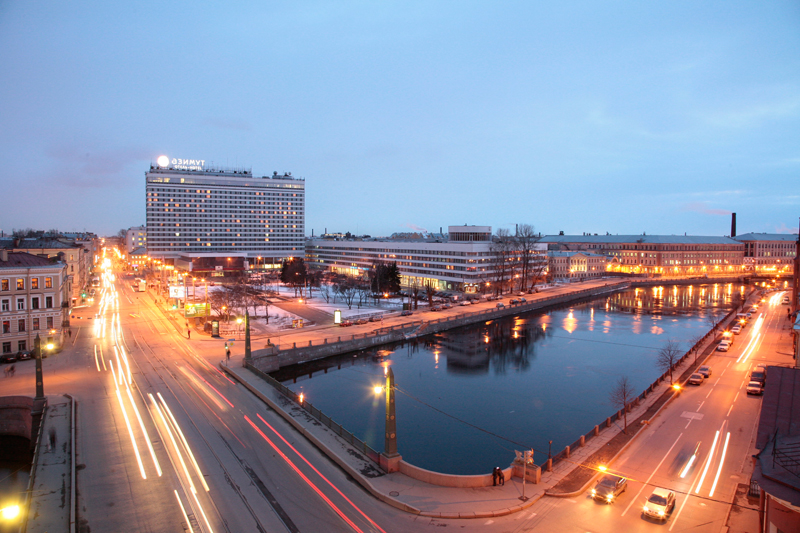
Azimut Hotel Saint Petersburg is the 156th largest hotel in the world as per foreign ranking agencies.

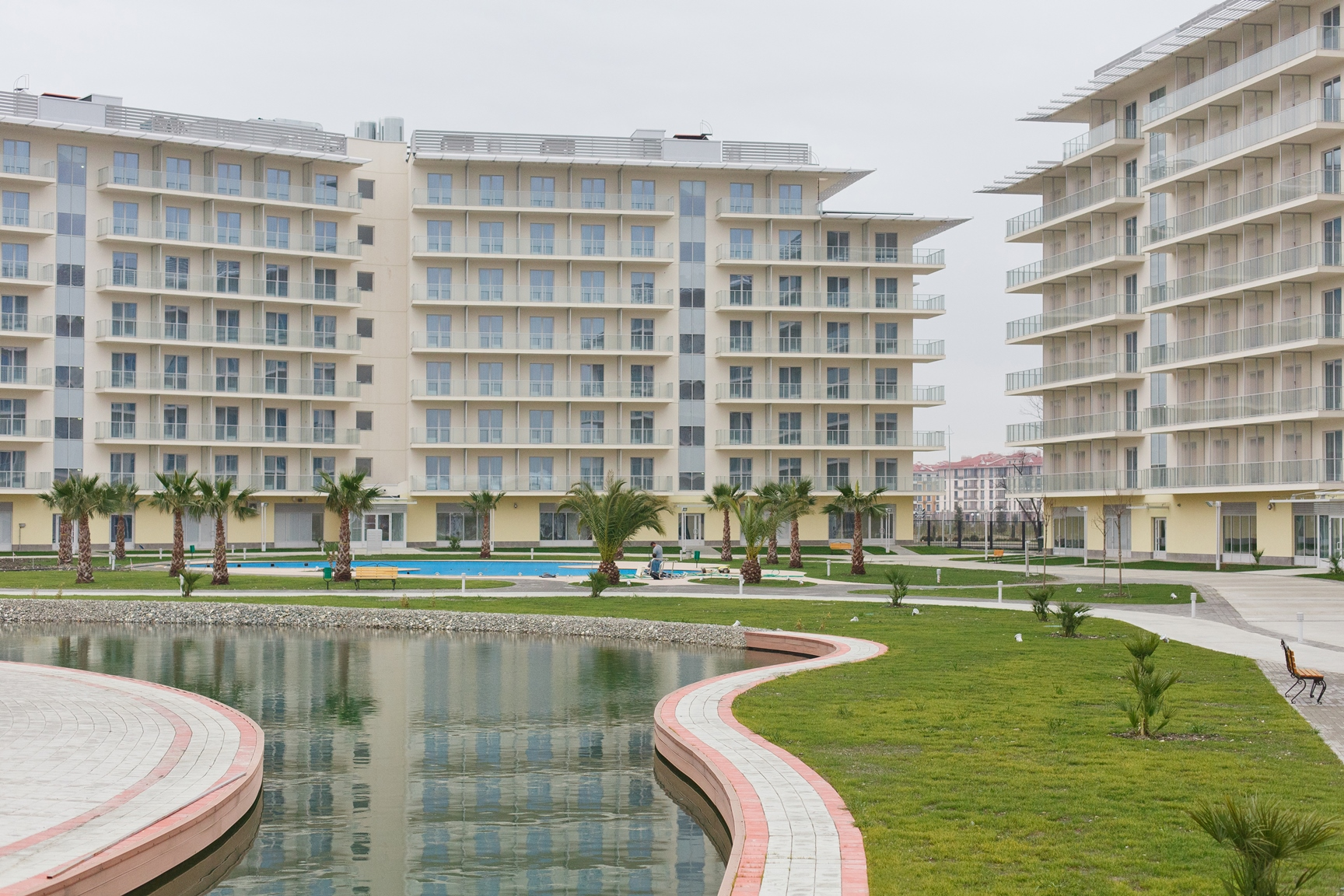
Azimut Hotel Sochi was the largest European hotel with 2880 rooms opened in 2013 prior to 2014 Winter Olympics in Sochi.

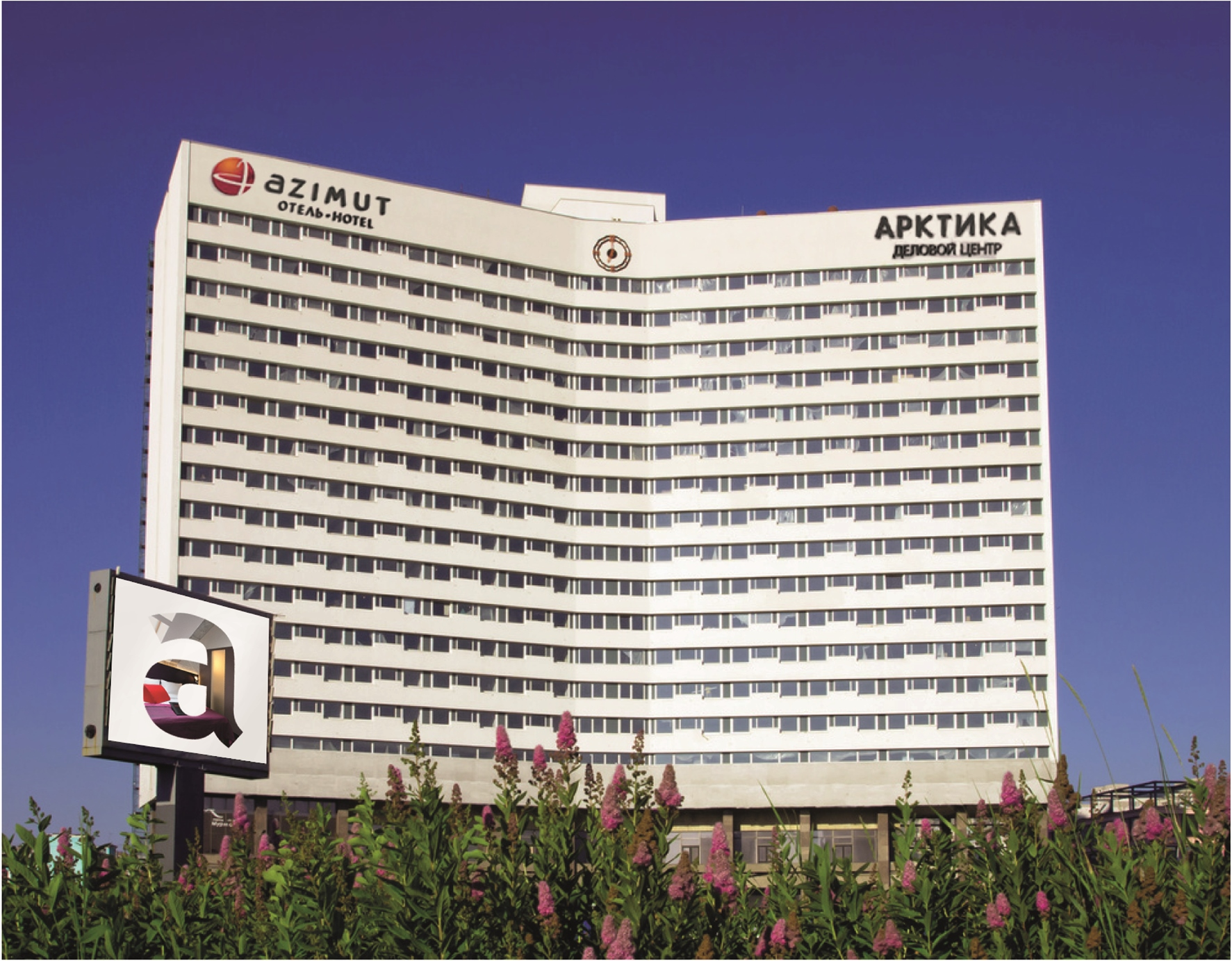
Arctic 18-floors building tallest beyond the Polar circle.

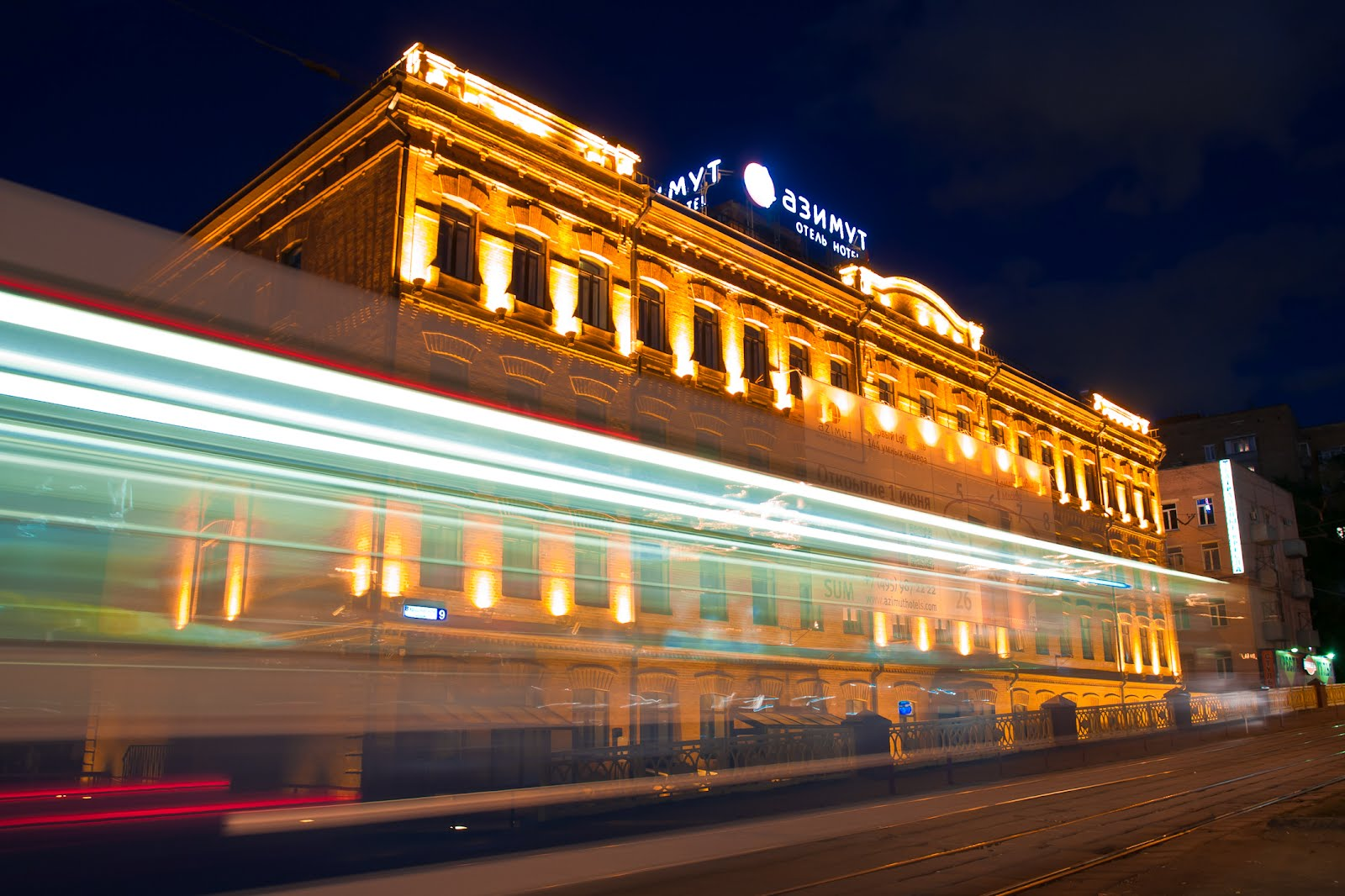
Azimut Hotel Moscow Tulskaya Moscow loft-hotel is the former Danilovskaya manufactory built in 1867 and restored later on (concept by Bruzkus Batek Architects and Reardonsmith Architects).

No.	Name of the hotel	City, Country	Room stock	Former name	Year of construction
1	Azimut Moscow Tulskaya Hotel 3*	Moscow, Russia	144	former bureau of Danilovskaya manufactory	1867
2	Azimut Moscow Olympic Hotel 4*	Moscow, Russia	496	Olympic Penta, Olympic Penta Renaissance	1991
3	Azimut Hotel Saint-Petersburg 3*	Saint Petersburg, Russia	581	Sovetskaya Hotel	1967
4	Azimut Hotel Sochi 3*	Sochi, Russia	2880	—	2013
5	Azimut Hotel Astrakhan	Astrakhan, Russia	242	Lotos Hotel	1971
6	Azimut Hotel Vladivostok 4*	Vladivostok, Russia	378	Vladivostok Hotel	
7	Azimut Hotel Voronezh 3*	Voronezh, Russia	308	Brno Hotel	1984
8	Azimut Hotel Kostroma 3*	Kostroma, Russia	90	Intourist Kostroma Hotel	1991
9	Azimut Hotel Murmansk 4*	Murmansk, Russia	186	Arktika Hotel	1984
10	Azimut Hotel Nizhny Novgorod 3*	Nizhny Novgorod, Russia	157	Nizhegorodskaya Hotel	1965
11	Azimut Hotel Samara 3*	Samara, Russia	96	National Hotel	1906
12	Azimut Hotel Siberia 3*	Novosibirsk, Russia	259	Intourist Siberia Hotel	1991
13	Azimut Hotel Ufa 3*	Ufa, Russia	204	Rossiya Hotel	1967
14	A Hotel Fontanka 3*	Saint Petersburg, Russia	456	former part of Sovetskaya Hotel	1967
15	A Hotel Amur Bay 3*	Vladivostok, Russia	203	former part of Vladivostok Hotel	
16	Azimut Hotel Berlin Kurfurstendamm 3*	Berlin, Germany	133	Hotel Belmondo Berlin (Austrian Hotel Company); Hardenberg; Frühling am Zoo	1920-е
17	Azimut Hotel Berlin City South 3*	Berlin, Germany	156	Best Western Eurohotel Berlin (Schönefeld) Airport; Sorat	1994
18	Azimut Hotel Dresden 3*	Dresden, Germany	64	Hotel Belmondo Dresden; Coventry-Hotel	1992, Altbau 1895
19	Azimut Hotel Cologne City Center 3*	Cologne, Germany	190	Belmondo	2008, Altbau 1925
20	Azimut Hotel Munich City East 3*	Munich, Germany	167	—	2008
21	Azimut Hotel Erding 3*	Erding, Germany	55	Euro Suites Hotel	1995
22	Azimut Hotel Nuremberg 3*	Nuremberg, Germany	118	Azimut Eurohotel & Suites	1991
23	Azimut Vienna Delta Hotel 4*	Austria, Vienna	180	Delta Hotel Vienna	2006
24	Euro Hotel Vienna Airport 3*	Austria, Vienna	114	Euro Hotel; Marco-Polo Hotel; Airport Hotel Vienna	1992

== Bibliography ==
- Vorontsova, M. G. (2014). Hotel Industry: Theory and Practice [Monograph] (in Russian). Saint Petersburg, Russia: Saint-Petersburg State University of Culture and Arts. ISBN 978-5-94708-194-7.
- Ovcharenko, N. P.; Rudenko, L. L.; Barashok, L. S. (2015). Organization of Hotel Industry [Educational edition] (in Russian). Moscow, Russia: Dashkov & Co. ISBN 978-5-394-02514-3.
- Chudnowski, A. D.; Zhukova, M. A.; Kormisheva, A. V. (2014). Strategic management in Tourism Industry [Educational edition (Tourism, Management)] (in Russian). Moscow, Russia: KnorusMedia. ISBN 978-5-406-01822-4.
