= Azimut Hotel Murmansk =

High-rise hotel in Murmansk, Russia

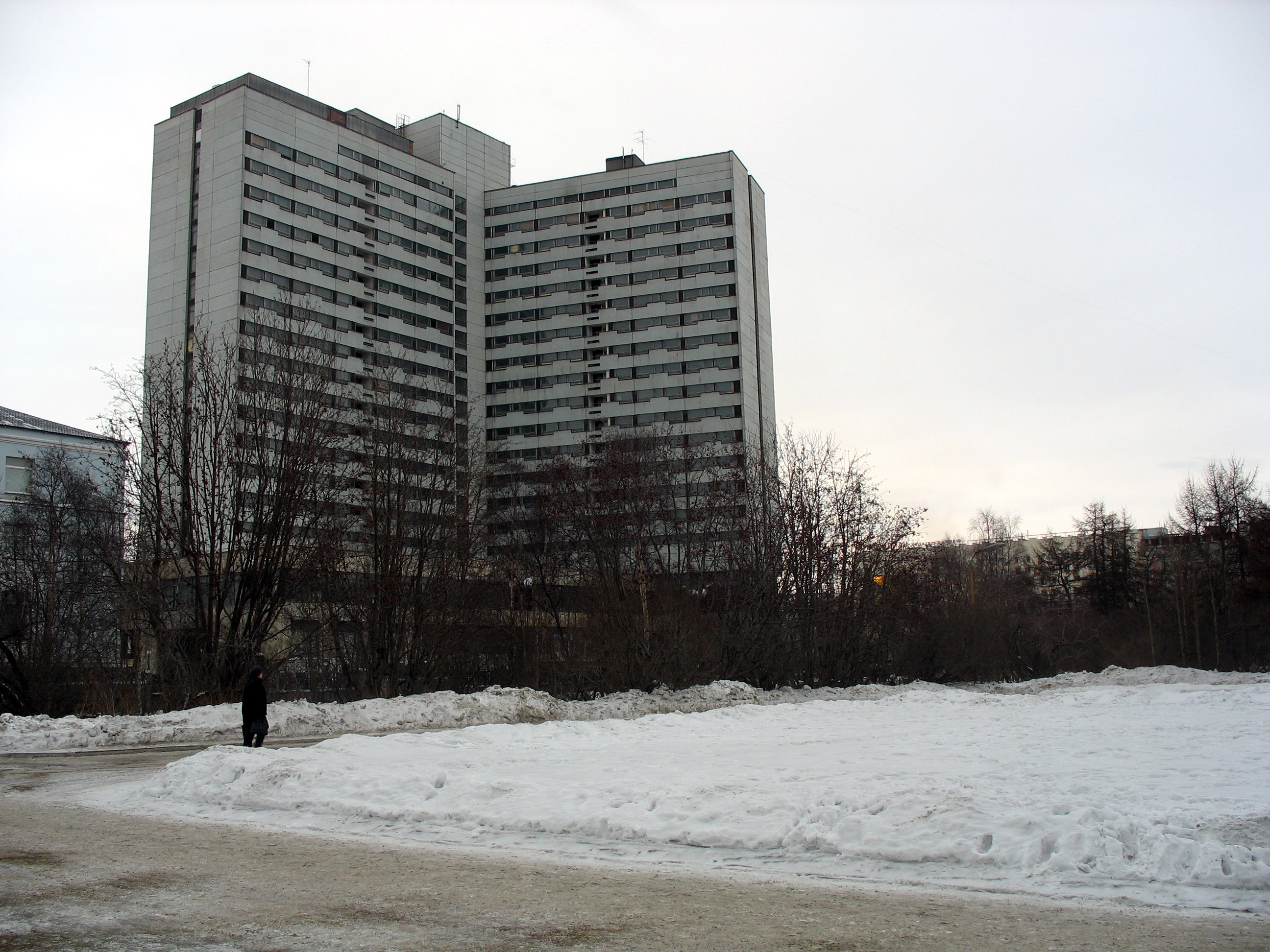
- Azimut Hotel Murmansk
- Hotel chain: Azimut Hotels

General information
- Type: Hotel
- Location: Five Corners, Murmansk, 82 Lenin Avenue, Murmansk, Russia
- Coordinates: 68°58′16.31″N 33°04′34.26″E
- Completed: 1984
- Opened: 29 January 1985
- Renovated: 13 September 2014
- Owner: Azimut Hotels (50%), City of Murmansk (50%)

Height
- Height: 54.86 m (180.0 ft)

Technical details
- Floor count: 19

Renovating team
- Architect: Nikolai Lyzlov
- Main contractor: RD Group

Other information
- Number of rooms: 186
- Number of restaurants: 2
- Number of bars: 2
- Parking: 150

Website
- Official website

The Azimut Hotel Murmansk is a high-rise hotel in the center of Murmansk, Russia. It opened in 1984, as the Hotel Arktika (Russian: Арктика) (Hotel Arctic) and was renamed the Azimut Hotel Murmansk in 2014, following major renovations. It is the tallest building in Murmansk and the tallest building located north of the Arctic Circle.

== Description ==
The hotel is located at 82 Lenin Avenue at Five Corners, Murmansk's main square. Prior to its 2009 closing, the hotel had a restaurant (also called "Arctic"), a cafe (the "Day and Night"), a billiards room, a hairdressing salon, a tanning salon, and several shops, bars, and coffee shops.

== History ==
The first Murmansk hotel named "Arktika" opened in 1933. It was a four–story brick building with 100 rooms. In 1972 – 1984 the old hotel was demolished and replaced by the current building.

Before 1988 the hotel was a state enterprise. In 1990 it became the property of a joint Soviet–Swedish company. In 1996 it acquired the status of a municipal hotel and restaurant complex, in 2003 it became a municipal unitary enterprise, and in 2006 it was privatized. Half the shares are held by the City of Murmansk and half by the Azimut Hotels Corporation.

In 1996 (the 80th anniversary of the establishment of Murmansk), following an initiative by mayor Oleg Naydenov, chimes were installed in the hotel which play "My Beloved Arctic", the unofficial anthem of Murmansk Oblast. The chimes were silenced from 2007 to 2009 for repairs.

== Renovation ==
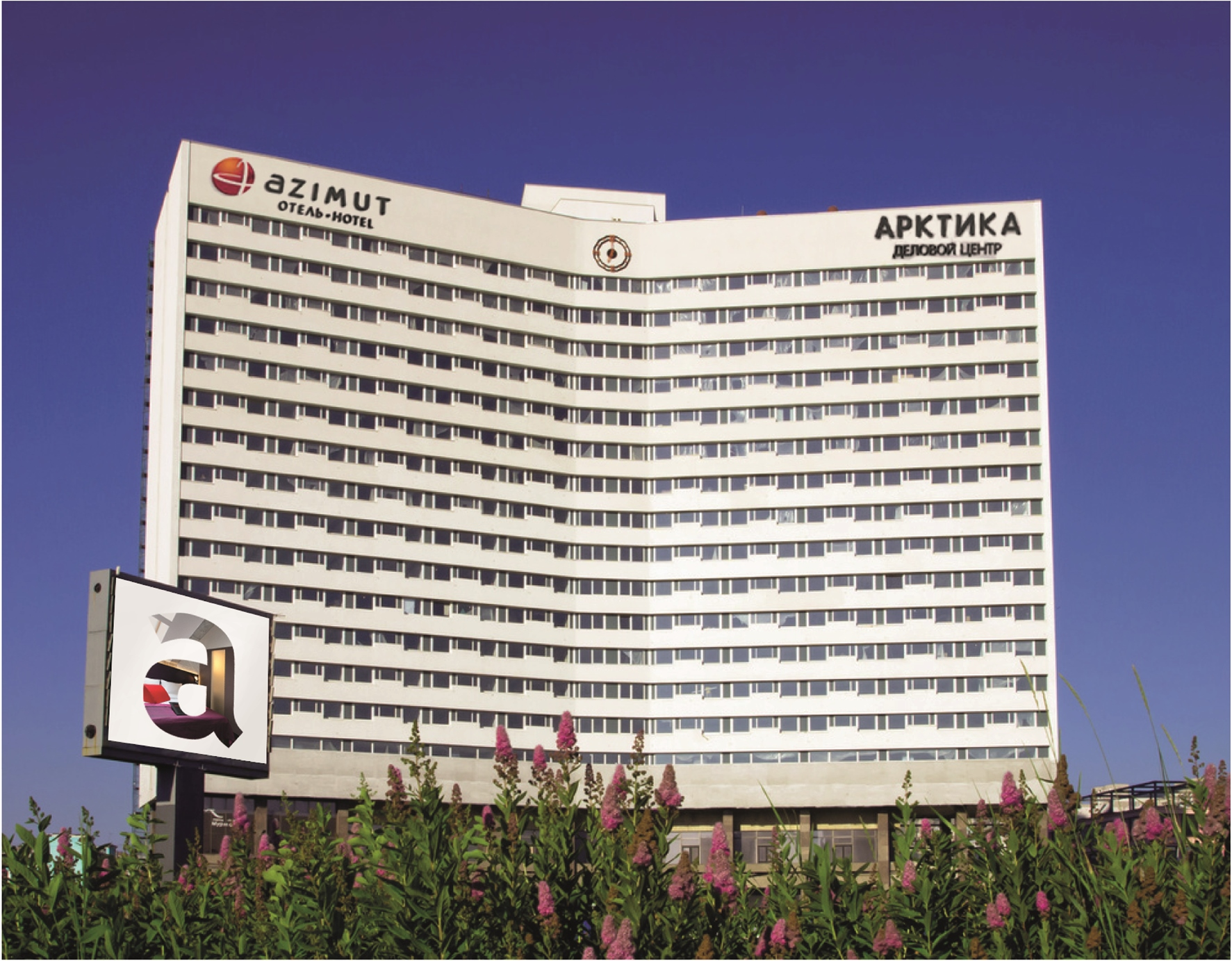
Azimut Hotel Murmansk (former The Hotel Arktika) was opened in 2014 after renovation

In 2009 the Hotel Arctic was closed for renovation, to upgrade the comfort and safety of the hotel.

The renovation was undertaken by the Azimut Hotels Company, the architectural firm of Nikolai Lyzlov, and a British architectural firm.

The renovation was designed so as to update the facade, increase the number of elevators, and provide space for boutiques, cafes, and restaurants. The utilities were to be updated, the outdated fire safety systems was to be replaced, and the average room size was to be increased to 80 square metres (860 sq ft). The first six or seven floors were converted to office space, with hotel rooms occupying only the upper ten floors.

The hotel reopened as the Azimut Hotel Murmansk on 13 September 2014.

== Notable guests ==
Various persons of note stayed at the old or new Arctic, including the Soviet physicist Sergei Vavilov, the arctic explorers Vladimir Wiese, Otto Schmidt, and Ivan Papanin, the Soviet writers Veniamin Kaverin, Konstantin Simonov, and Valentin Kataev, and the Russian/Soviet zoologist Nikolai Knipovich. The hotel provides accommodation for participants in the Northern Festival (the "Polar Olympics") which is held in Murmansk.

== In literature ==
The Arctic is mentioned in the poem "A Toast to Zhenya" by Yuri Vizbor:

Well now, citizen, look at yourself.
You've stayed 'til one.
Now it's closing time!
Paid your tab?
Better tote it up.
Or are you planning to stay 'til dawn?
Damn.
With a face that has forgotten how to smile
I walked away from the past...
From the Hotel Arctic
Into a darkness untouched by any god:
The blind polar night.
