= Valley of Glory =

Valley in Murmansk Oblast, Russia

Coordinates: 69°18′36″N 32°12′19″E

- Долина Славы
- Murmansk Oblast, Russia
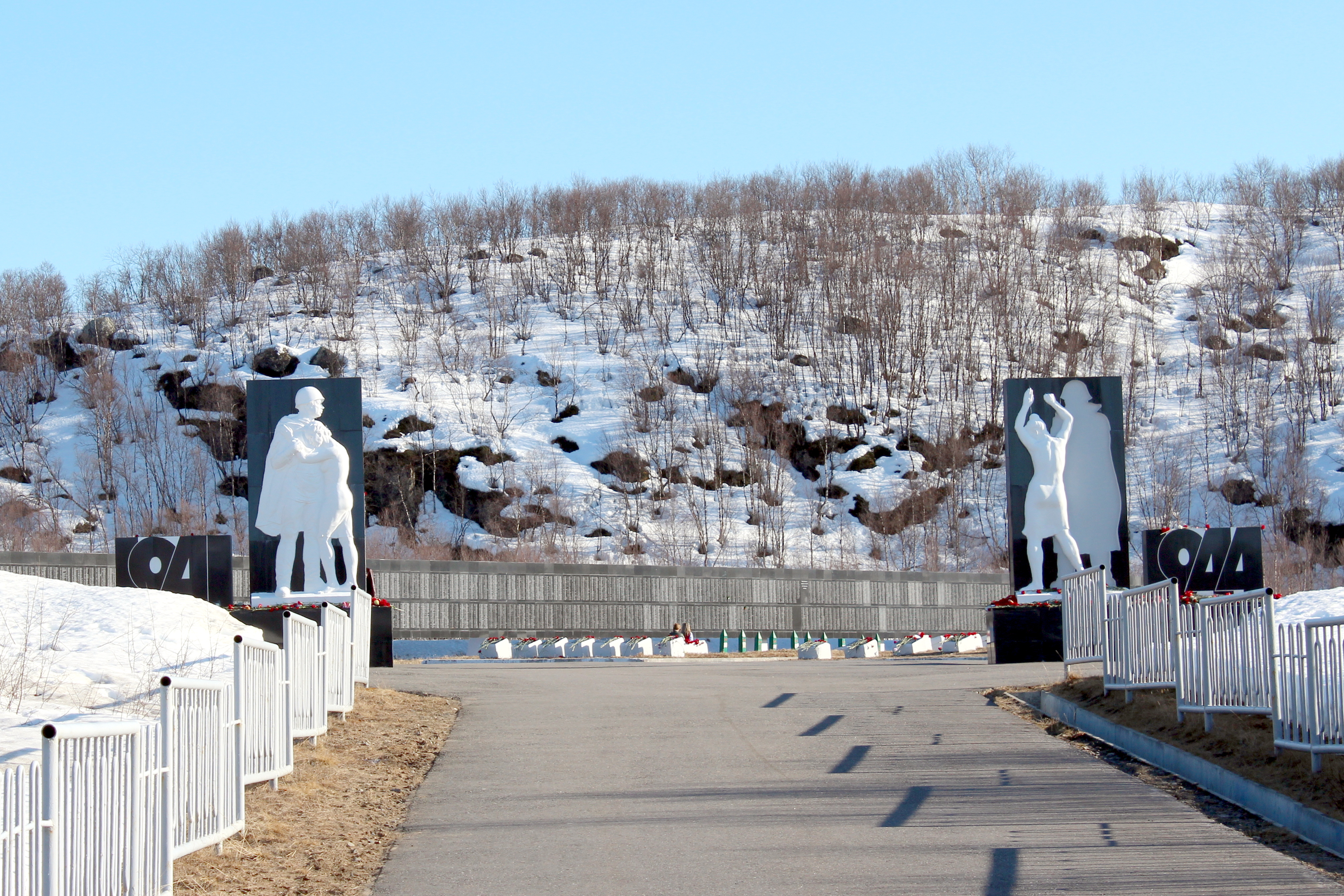
- For Defenders of the Soviet Arctic in WWII
- Established: 1959

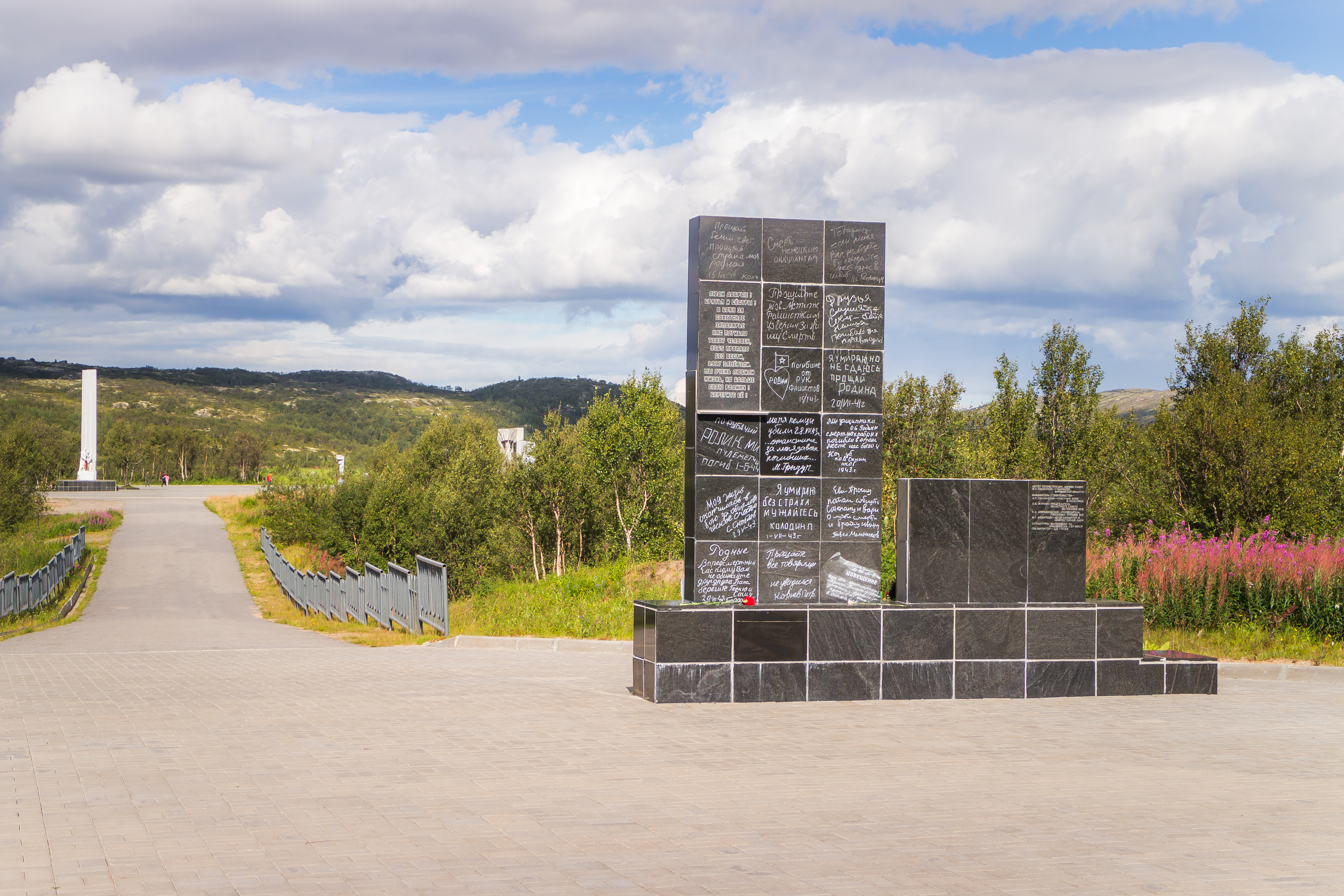
Memorial of the Valley of Glory in the Murmansk Oblast of Russia.

The Valley of Glory (Russian: Долина Славы) is a valley on the right bank of the Zapadnaya Litsa River. A bloody battle began in the summer of 1941 for the region as German forces launched an offensive towards Murmansk, Russia. Russian forces halted the German assault and the frontline stabilized until the autumn of 1944.

A Memorial to the defenders of the Soviet Arctic has been erected in the Valley of Glory. Festive and solemn events of servicemen of the Northern Fleet and residents of the Murmansk region are held near the memorial.

7 thousand people lie in the ground of the memorial cemetery. In 2018, the remains of 72 more Red Army soldiers were buried.

It was previously called "The Valley of Death".

Valley of Glory has a memorial wall with the names of the fallen soldiers.

== New name ==
In 2018, the Committee for Culture and Art of the Murmansk Oblast renamed the memorial to the "Monument to the Fallen".
