= Five Corners, Murmansk =

Main square of Murmansk, Russia

Coordinates: 68°58′15″N 33°04′30″E

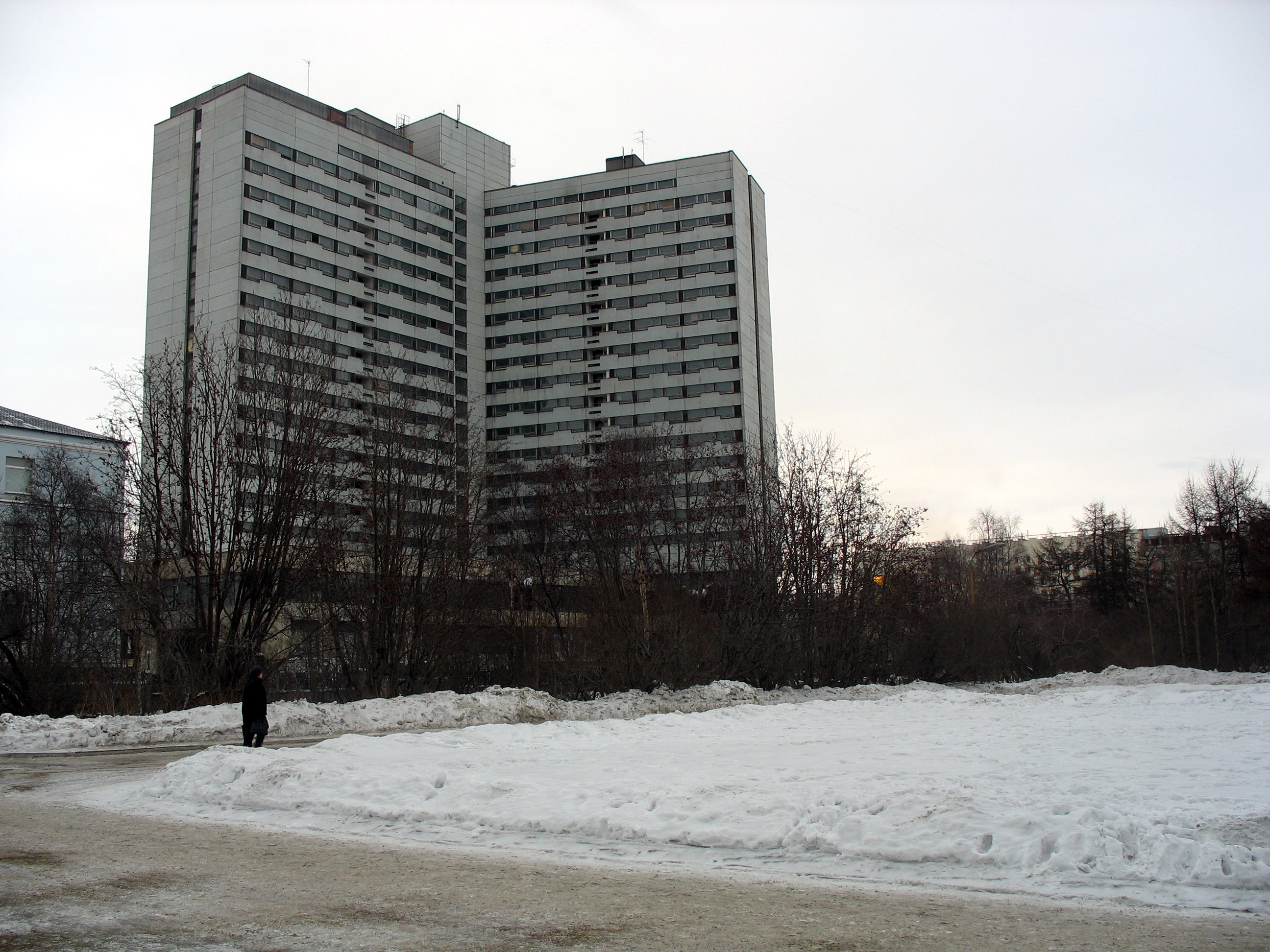
Azimut Hotel Murmansk on Five Corners

Five Corners Square (Russian: Площадь Пять Углов; tr. Ploshchad' Pyat' Uglov) is the main square of Murmansk, Russia. From 1977 until December 1990 it was formally named "Soviet Constitution Square", but this name never entered wide popular use.

The following buildings are located on the square:

- the Murmansk Regional Duma building (this building formerly housed the Sevryba Management Software company)
- the General Post Office
- the Kirov Cultural and Technology Center
- the Azimut Hotel Murmansk (formerly the Arctic)
- the Meridian Hotel
- Volna ("Wave"), a supermarket

Until the mid-1980s, there were many two-story wooden houses around the square. The last of these were demolished after the construction of the Hotel Arctic.
