= Alexander Klyachin =

Russian businessman

- Born: Александр Ильич Клячин; May 18, 1967 (age 59); Moscow, Russian SFSR, Soviet Union (now Russia)
- Education: Oregon State University; Moscow State University
- Occupations: Entrepreneur, investor
- Years active: 1993-

Alexander Klyachin (Russian: Александр Ильич Клячин) is a Russian entrepreneur and investor. According to Forbes, as of April 2021, his fortune is estimated at $1.6 billion in 2020, making him the 60th richest businessperson in Russia. He is the Head of the investment company Gleden Invest. Also, he founded the international hotel chain Azimut Hotels and owns the fashionable Metropol Hotel near the Moscow Kremlin. Alexander is a large commercial real estate developer and owns KR Properties and the Karat cheese factory in Moscow. Mass media allege him of being a major corporate raider, getting hold of plots of land by using complicated juridical schemes within land-use conflicts. Novye Izvestia newspaper 2021 published a report disclosing schemes involving land where the Russian business centre of the Swedish Ikea company has resided for decades.

== Biography ==
Klyachin was born in Moscow on May 18, 1967.

In 1984 he finished Moscow School 57.

In 1991 he graduated from the Geography Department of Moscow State University.

Alexander also graduated from Oregon State University in the USA in 1993, majoring in geography.

In 1993 he worked in the finance field. In the early 2000s, he began working in the real estate industry, acquiring land plots in Moscow and the Moscow region. His company KR Properties redeveloped former industrial zones into modern business districts.

In 2006 he founded Azimut Hotels. It began with reconstructing old hotels and buildings of the Soviet era in Russian cities. In 2008 Azimut Hotels became the first Russian hotel chain to enter the European market (Austria and Germany). The company manages over 50 hotels in Russia, Europe, and Israel.

In 2012 Alexander Klyachin became the owner of the historic Metropol Hotel near the Moscow Kremlin.

In 2021 Klyachin's company Gleden Invest signed a memorandum with the state corporation VEB on cooperation within a wide pool of tourism cluster development projects in Siberia, the Far East and the North Caucasus. Currently, Klyachin is signing agreements with several heads of Russian regions (Yaroslavl, Kemerovo, Samara regions, etc.) on the construction and development of industrial and tourist facilities. Among the largest projects is the development of the Sheregesh ski resort in Gornaya Shoria (Siberia).

Alexander has also invested in the oil industry, high technology field, and in restaurant business.

Klyachin is the founder of the Khamovniki charity foundation for the support of social research.

In 2012 Alexander Klyachin joined the Bolshoi Theater Board of Trustees.

In 2021 Klyachin has been appointed board chairman of Moscow’s Jewish Museum and Tolerance Center.
