= Murman Murmansk =

Bandy club in Murmansk, Russia

Murman
- City: Murmansk, Russia
- League: Russian Bandy Super League
- Founded: 1952; 74 years ago
- Home arena: Stroitel Stadium
- Website: www.hk-murman.ru

KhK Murman Murmansk (Russian: ХК «Мурман» Мурманск) is a bandy club in Murmansk, Russia. From the 2018–19 season, the club plays in the Russian Bandy Super League, the top-tier of Russian bandy. The home games are played at Stadium Stroitel in Murmansk. The club colours are black and yellow.

The club was founded in 1952 and disestablished in 1996. After four years, it was started again in 2000.
