= Stroitel Stadium (Murmansk) =

Bandy venue in Murmansk, Russia

Coordinates: 68.9664°N 33.0786°E

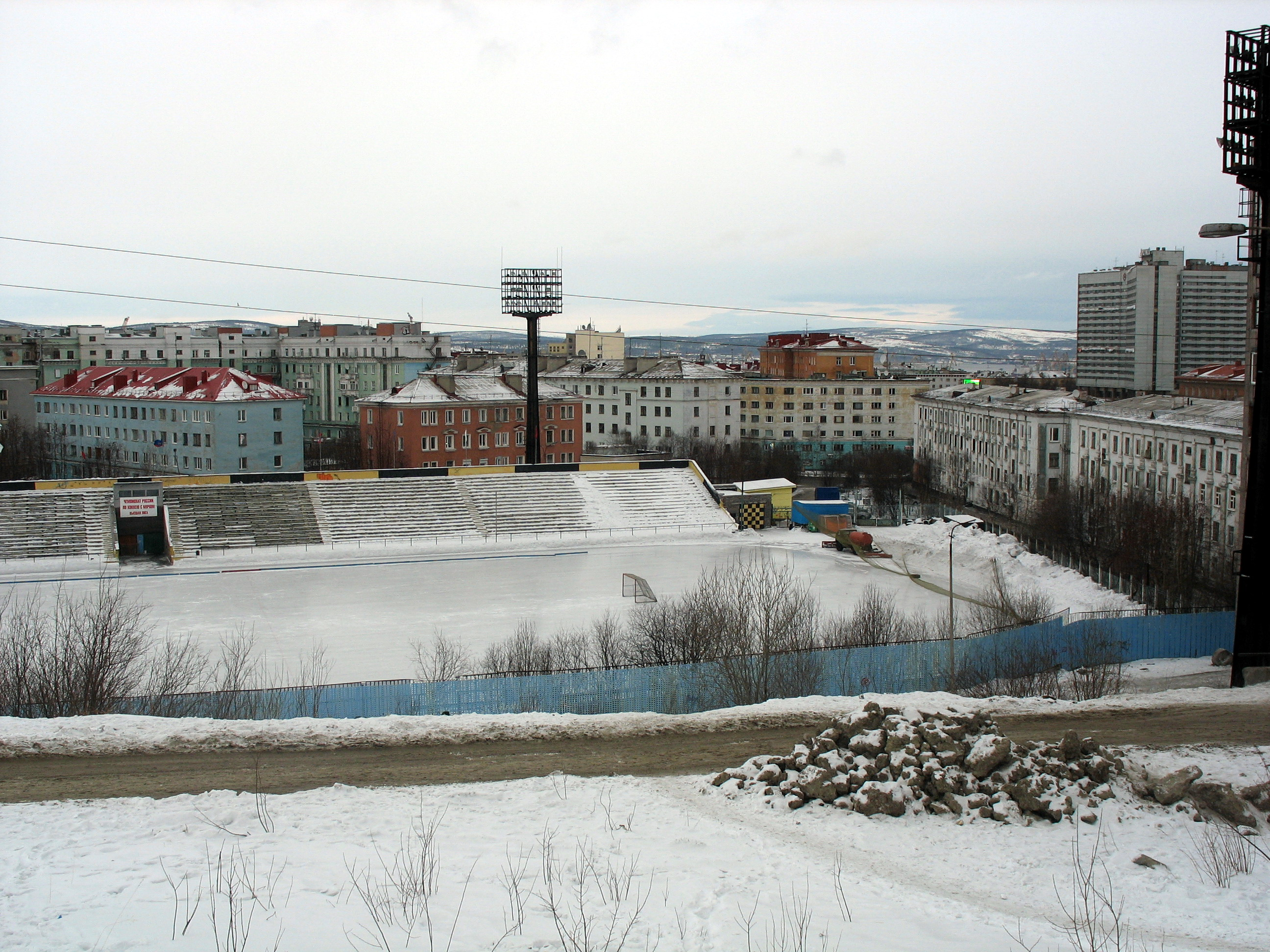
Stadium Stroitel

Stroitel Stadium (Russian: Стадион «Строитель») is a bandy arena in Murmansk, Russia. Its audience capacity is 5,000 people. It is the home arena of bandy club Murman Murmansk.
