= Vitaly Bubentsov =

Russian artist

Vitaliy Bubentsov
- Born: Vitaliy Nikolayevich Bubentsov; 12 February 1944 (age 82); Murmansk, Soviet Union
- Education: Leningrad Serov Art School (1963), Leningrad Repin Academy of Arts (1972)
- Known for: Painting, Drawing
- Movement: Realism

Vitaliy Nikolayevich Bubentsov (Russian: Виталий Бубенцов; born February 12, 1944, Murmansk) is a Russian artist working in the genres of portrait, landscape, still-life and thematic picture executed in various techniques. He is an honored artist of the Russian Federation, a member of the Artists’ Union of Russia, a member of the International Association of Visual Art AIAP, UNESCO.

== Biography ==
He was born in 1944 in Murmansk. Since 1969 he has been regularly participating in All-Union, republican, district and regional art exhibitions. He is a participant of foreign exhibitions in Finland, Norway, Sweden, the United States, Denmark, the Netherlands. He lives and works in Murmansk.

== Education ==
Has left Leningrad Serov Art School in 1963 and Leningrad Repin Academy of Arts in 1972.

== Solo exhibitions ==
- 1978 — Solo exhibition (Murmansk, Russia), solo exhibition (Rovaniemi, Finland)
- 1986 — Solo exhibition (Lulea, Sweden)
- 1990 — Solo exhibition (Murmansk, Russia)
- 1991 — Solo exhibition (Ide Gallery, the Netherlands)
- 1993 — Solo exhibition (Rovaniemi, Finland)
- 1994 — Solo exhibition (the Netherlands)
- 1996 — Solo exhibition (Murmansk, Russia), solo exhibition (Pskov, Russia)
- 1997 — Solo exhibition (Murmansk, Russia)
- 1998 — Solo exhibition (Murmansk, Russia)
- 2001 — Solo exhibition (Murmansk, Russia)
- 2004 — Solo exhibition (the International Artists Studio in Vadsyo, Norway), solo anniversary exhibition (Murmansk, Russia)
- 2005 — Solo exhibition (Murmansk, Russia)
- 2008 — Solo exhibition «Vitaliy Bubentsov in Groningen» (Museum on Shipping History in Groningen, the Netherlands)

== Group exhibitions ==
- 1972 — Republican exhibition «Around the Native Country» (Moscow, Russia)
- 1974 — The 4th zonal exhibition «The Soviet North» (Vologda, Russia)
- 1977 — «The Youth of Russia» (Moscow, Russia), «The Artists of Russia to Fishermen» (Astrakhan - Kaliningrad – Murmansk – Moscow), All-Union exhibition «The Youth of the Country » (Moscow, Russia), All-Union exhibition of monumental art (Kazan, Russia), group ex hibition of works of participants of All-Union creative team of marine painters (Arkhangelsk, Russia)
- 1978 — All-Union exhibition «The Native Country » (Minsk, Belarus), All-Union water color exhibition (Moscow, Russia)
- 1979 — The 5th zonal exhibition «The Soviet North» (Syktyvkar, Russia), All-Union exhibition «Blue Roads of the Motherland» (Moscow, Russia)
- 1980 — Republican exhibition «The Nature and We» (Moscow – Leningrad - Murmansk)
- 1981 — «Around the Native Country» (Moscow, Russia), the 7th All-Union water color exhibition (Moscow, Russia)
- 1983 — The 3rd All-Russian exhibition «Drawing and Water Color» (Leningrad, Russia), «Blue Scopes of Russia» (Moscow, Russia)
- 1984 — All-Union water color exhibition (Moscow, Russia), the 6th zonal exhibition «The Soviet North» (Novgorod, Russia)
- 1985 — «The World was Disputed –We will Save it» (Moscow, Russia), All-Russian exhibition of artists-water-colorists (Moscow, Russia), international exhibition of works of artists of a symposium «Experimental Painting 85» (Lulea, Sweden), foreign exhibition of works of Murmansk artists (Boden, Sweden), «The Kola Earth» (Arkhangelsk, Russia)
- 1986 — «Graphics of the Arctic Circle» (Riga, Latvia), «Artists of Murman» (Petrozavodsk, Karelia)
- 1987 — The 8th All-Union water color exhibition (Leningrad, Russia), All-Union exhibition «The Artist and the time» (Moscow, Russia)
- 1989 — District exhibition «Artists of the North» (Murmansk, Russia), exhibition of works of Murmansk artists (Vadsyo, Norway)
- 1991 — Foreign exhibition of works of Murmansk artists (Rovaniemi, Finland)
- 1992 — Foreign exhibition of works of Murmansk artists (Galleries "Dowton" and "Kent" in Jacksonville, the USA)
- 1993 — Foreign exhibition of works of Murmansk artists (Denmark)
- 1997 — District exhibition «The Russian North» (Kirov, Russia), solo exhibition (Murmansk, Russia)
- 1998 — The 9th Russian exhibition "Russia" (Moscow, Russia), foreign exhibition of works of Murmansk artists (Groningen, the Netherlands)
- 1999 — «A Green noise» (Ples, Russia), «To your Name …» (Moscow, Russia)
- 2000 — «The Image of the Native Country» (Kirov, Russia)
- 2003 — The 9th district exhibition «The Russian North»
- 2004 — Russian exhibition «Russia Х» (Moscow, Russia), the 1st international exhibition of water color "Aquabiennale" (Petrozavodsk, Karelia), «School. Teacher. Art» (Cheboksary, Chuvashiya)
- 2005 — International exhibition devoted to the 60th anniversary of the victory (Moscow, Russia), «Artists of Murman» (Vologda, Russia), exhibition of artists of the North-West of Russia "Sports" (Murmansk, Russia)
- 2006 — Academic travelling exhibition «The North-West of Russia» (Murmansk-Petrozavodsk-St. Petersburg-Novgorod)
- 2007 — «Around the Native Country» (Vologda, Russia), international exhibition "Ljust" (Gallery Bjutenljust, the Netherlands), exhibition of participants of the international plein air «Quiet dawns over Sergilahta» (Karelia)
- 2008 — All-Russian art exhibition "Fatherland" devoted to the 50th anniversary of the Artists’ Union of Russia; group exhibition at the international festival in commemoration of Barents (Vardyo, Norway), exhibition of participants of the Russian plein air – 2008 within the limits of the international exhibition "Aquabiennale" (Kizhi, Karelia)
- 2009 — "Russia" the 11th Russian art exhibition (Moscow, Russia)
- 2010 — International art exhibition "65 Years of the Victory» (Moscow, Russia)

== Ranks and awards ==
- an honored artist of the Russian Federation,
- a member of the Artists’ Union of Russia,
- a member of the International Association of Visual Art AIAP, UNESCO.

He is awarded with a silver medal of the Academy of Arts of Russia, a recipient of Murmansk Komsomol Prize, twice of the Regional Administration Prize, an award winner of the Artists’ Union of Russia.

== The works of the artist are kept in collections of ==
- Murmansk Regional Art Museum;
- Murmansk Regional Local History Museum;
- Management Office of Exhibitions of Art Fund of the RSFSR;
- Management Office of Exhibitions of the Ministry of Culture of Russia;
- Central Museum of Old Russian Culture and Art n. a. A. Rublyov;
- Belarus State Art Museum of Minsk city;
- State Art Museum of Latvia, Riga city;
- Pskov State Historical, Architectural and Art Memorial Estate;
- Vologda Regional Art Gallery;
- Town Showroom of Petrozavodsk city, Karelia;
- Ples State Historical, Architectural and Art Memorial Estate;
- Gallery of the Society Fnik of Lulea city, Sweden;
- Local History Museum of Sebezh city, Pskov region;
- Local History Museum of Pustoshka city, Pskov region;
- In national art galleries: Podtesovo vil., Krasnodar Krai, Rodnino vil., Altay Krai, Privolnaya village, Krasnodar Krai;
- In internet gallery Art from Russia;
- In galleries and private collections of Russia in the cities: Moscow, St. Petersburg, Murmansk, Arkhangelsk, Vologda, Pskov, etc.;
- In galleries and private collections abroad: Norway, Sweden, Denmark, Finland, the Netherlands, France, Germany, Bulgaria, the USA, etc.

== Information and publications on creative work ==
- Since 1990 numerous publications on oeuvre of Bubentsov in newspaper "Murmanskiy Vestnik"
- 2001 — Artists of Northern, Siberian and Far Eastern districts of Russia. Book one
- 2002 — The Best People of Russia: encyclopedia
- 2003 — «The Artist of Russia» №19-20
- 2004 — Newspaper "Finnmarken" (Norway)
- 2005 — Anniversary album of the Artists’ Union
- 2005 — Magazine «Triumphal Arch» №1
- 2005 — Newspaper Østhavet (Norway)
- 2007 — Magazine Russian Gallery – XXI century. №5
- 2007 — Album «Prize Winners and Diploma Winners of Academic Exhibitions in Federal Districts of Russia - 250 years of the Russian Academy of Arts»
- 2008 — Biographical article «Kola Encyclopedia»
- 2008 — Booklet of participants of the plein air of artists-water-colorists in Kizhi (Karelia)
- 2008 — Newspaper «Woensdag» of April 9, 2008 (the Netherlands)
- 2008 — Newspaper «Dinsdag» of April 8, 2008 (the Netherlands)

== Other activity ==
- In 2004 he worked in the International Artists Studio in Vadsyo (Norway)
- Now he is teaching in Murmansk State Pedagogical University. He is an assistant professor of the fine arts department.
