= Murmansk =

City in Murmansk Oblast, Russia

Murmansk Мурманск
- City

Other transcription(s)
  - Kildin Sami: Мурман ланнҍ
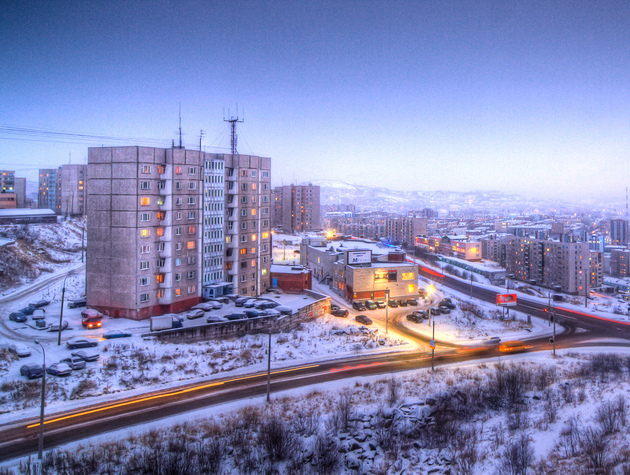
- Murmansk skyline

- Coat of arms
- Interactive map of Murmansk
- Location of Murmansk Murmansk (European Russia) Murmansk (Europe)
- Coordinates: 68°58′14″N 33°04′30″E
- Country: Russia
- Federal subject: Murmansk Oblast
- Official foundation date (see text): 4 October 1916
- City status since: 19 July 1916

Government
  - Body: Council of Deputies
  - Mayor: Ivan Lebedev

Area
  - Total: 168.14 km^{2} (64.92 sq mi)
- Elevation: 50 m (160 ft)

Population (2021 Census)
  - Total: 270,384
  - Estimate (2025): 264,339 (−2.2%)
  - Density: 1,600/km^{2} (4,100/sq mi)

Administrative status
  - Subordinated to: City of Murmansk
  - Capital of: Murmansk Oblast, City of Murmansk

Municipal status
  - Urban okrug: Murmansk Urban Okrug
  - Capital of: Murmansk Urban Okrug
- Time zone: UTC+3 (MSK)
- Postal code: 183000–183099
- Dialing code: +7 8152
- OKTMO ID: 47701000001
- City Day: 4 October
- Website: citymurmansk.ru

Murmansk (Russian: Мурманск) is the administrative center and largest city of Murmansk Oblast in the far northwest part of Russia. It is a major port city and is the world's most populous city north of the Arctic Circle. It sits on both slopes and banks of Kola Bay, with its bulk on the east bank of the inlet. The bay, a modest fjord, is an estuarine inlet of the Barents Sea. The city is a major port of the Arctic Ocean and is about 100 kilometres (62 mi) from the border with Norway, 180 kilometres (110 mi) from the border with Finland, and 1,930 kilometres (1,200 mi) from Moscow.

Being a non-freezing port due to the warm North Atlantic Current, Murmansk resembles cities of its size across western Russia, with highway and railway access to the rest of Europe, and the northernmost trolleybus system on Earth. Its connectivity contrasts with the isolation of Arctic ports like the Siberian Dikson on the shores of the Kara Sea, and Iqaluit in the Canadian Arctic. Despite long, snowy winters, Murmansk's climate is moderated by the generally ice-free waters around it.

Murmansk grew substantially throughout the twentieth century, particularly after World War II during the Cold War arms race. Murmansk's population has been in decline since the end of the Cold War, from 468,039 (1989 Soviet census); 336,137 (2002 census); 307,257 (2010 census); to 270,384 (2021 Census).

== Etymology ==
The name of the city is derived from Murman, from an old name for Norwegians by Russians; it is likely a borrowing from Old Norse norðmaðr (possibly related to Old English Norþmann and English Northman), which gave its name to the Murman Coast and the surrounding region including the Kola Peninsula.

== History ==
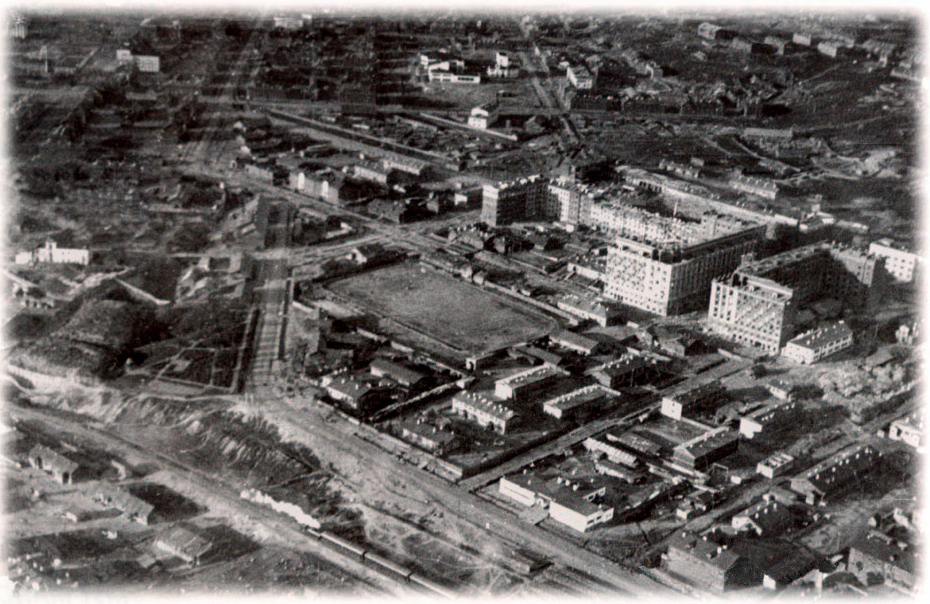
Aerial view of Murmansk, 1936

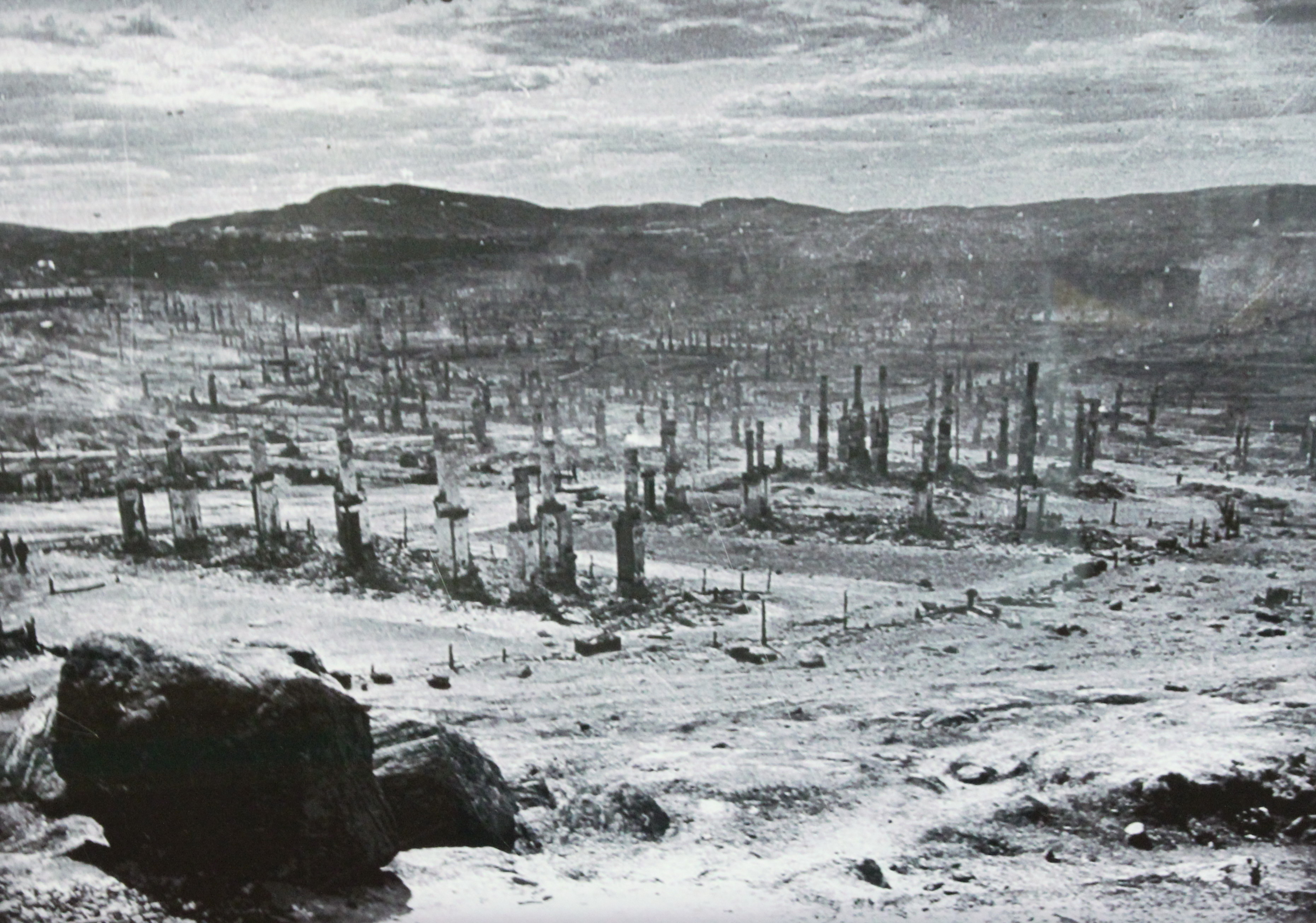
War destruction in Murmansk (1942)

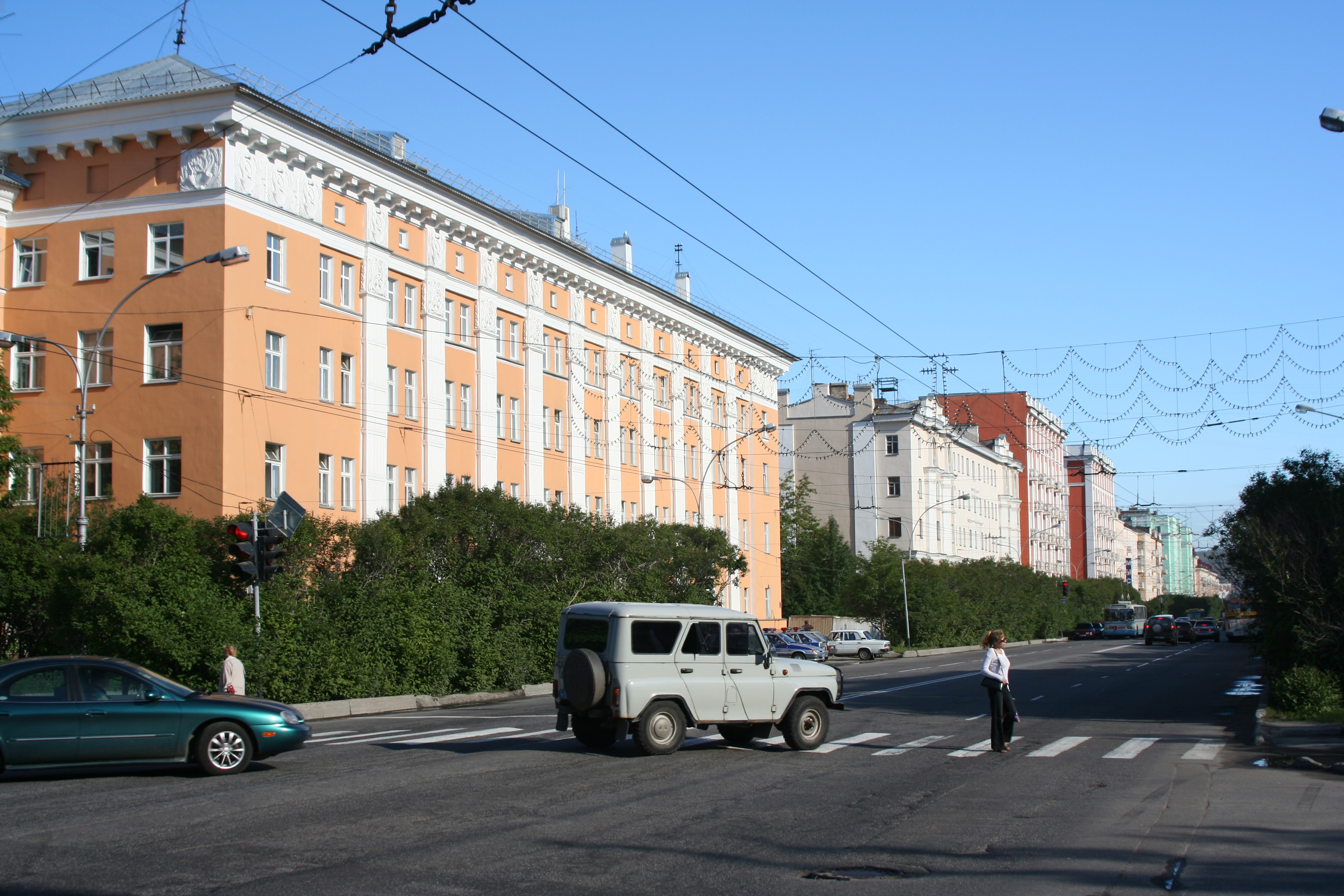
Central part of Murmansk

Murmansk was the last city founded in the Russian Empire. In 1915, World War I needs led to the construction of the northern part of the Kirov Railway: a railroad from Petrozavodsk to an ice-free location on the Murman Coast in the Russian Arctic, to which Russia's allies shipped military supplies. The terminus became known as the Murman station and soon boasted a port, a naval base, and an adjacent settlement with a population that quickly grew in size and soon surpassed the nearby towns of Alexandrovsk and Kola.

On June 29 [O.S. July 12], 1916, Russian Transport Minister Alexander Trepov petitioned to grant urban status to the railway settlement. On July 6 [O.S. July 19], 1916, the petition was approved and the town was named Romanov-on-Murman (Рома́нов-на-Му́рмане, Romanov-na-Murmane), after the Imperial Russian dynasty, the Romanovs. On September 21 [O.S. October 4], 1916, the official ceremony was performed, and the date is now considered the official date of the city's foundation. After the February Revolution of March 1917, on April 3 [O.S. April 16], 1917, the town was given its present name.

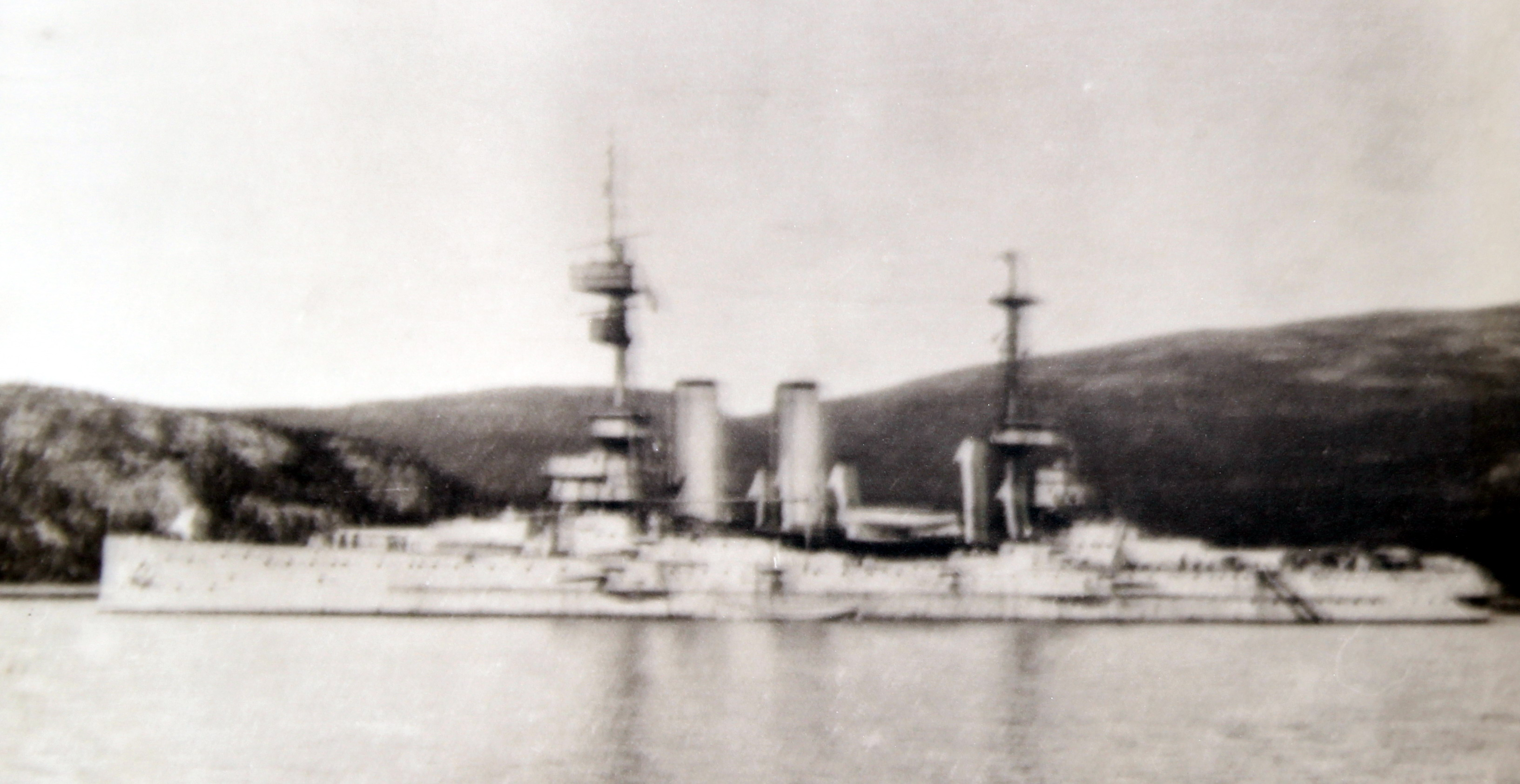
HMS Glory, flagship of the British North Russia Squadron in Murmansk in the First World War

In the winter of 1917 the British North Russia Squadron under Rear Admiral Thomas Kemp was based at Murmansk.

From 1918 to 1920, during the Russian Civil War, the town was occupied by the Western powers, who had been allied in World War I, and was also controlled by White Army forces.

On 13 February 1926, local self-government was organized in Murmansk for the first time, during a plenary session of the Murmansk City Soviet, which elected a Presidium. Before this, the city was governed by the authorities of Alexandrovsky Uyezd and later of Murmansk Governorate. On 1 August 1927, the All-Russian Central Executive Committee (VTsIK) issued two resolutions: "On the Establishment of Leningrad Oblast" and "On the Borders and Composition of the Okrugs of Leningrad Oblast", which transformed Murmansk Governorate into Murmansk Okrug within Leningrad Oblast and made Murmansk the administrative center of Murmansk Okrug.

In 1934, the Murmansk Okrug Executive Committee developed a redistricting proposal, which included a plan to enlarge the city by merging the surrounding territories in the north, south, and west into Murmansk. This plan was not confirmed by the Leningrad Oblast Executive Committee. In 1935–1937 several rural localities of Kolsky and Polyarny Districts were merged into Murmansk anyway.

According to the Presidium of the 'Leningrad Oblast Executive Committee resolution of 26 February 1935', the administrative center of Polyarny District was moved from Polyarnoye to Sayda-Guba. However, the provisions of the resolution were not fully implemented, and due to military construction in Polyarnoye, the administrative center was instead moved to Murmansk in the beginning of 1935. In addition to being the administrative center of Murmansk Okrug, Murmansk continued to serve as the administrative center of Polyarny District until 11 September 1938. On 10 February 1938, when the VTsIK adopted a Resolution changing the administrative-territorial structure of Murmansk Okrug, the city of Murmansk became a separate administrative division of the okrug, equal in status to that of the districts. This status was retained when Murmansk Okrug was transformed into Murmansk Oblast on 28 May 1938. The Germans were promised the use of the port they called Norwegenhafen for transportation of goods and raw materials from 1922 to 1941.

From March 1941 to 1945, the US government supplied Allied nations with food, oil, and materiel through the Lend-Lease policy. Murmansk was a link to the Western world for the Soviet Union. Arctic convoys brought large quantities of goods: primarily military equipment, manufactured goods and raw materials.

Wehrmacht and Finnish forces in Finnish territory launched an offensive against Murmansk as part of Operation Silver Fox (29 June to 17 November 1941). Fierce Soviet resistance and harsh local weather, with the bad terrain, prevented them from capturing it. The Luftwaffe bombed Murmansk 792 times during World War II. It suffered extensive destruction, the magnitude of which was rivaled only by the destruction in Leningrad and Stalingrad.

On 6 May 1985, the city's resistance was commemorated at the 40th anniversary of the victory over Nazi Germany in the formal designation of Murmansk as a Hero City. During the Cold War Murmansk was a center of Soviet submarine and icebreaker activity. Since the dissolution of the Soviet Union (December 1991), the nearby city and naval base of Severomorsk remain the headquarters of the Russian Northern Fleet.

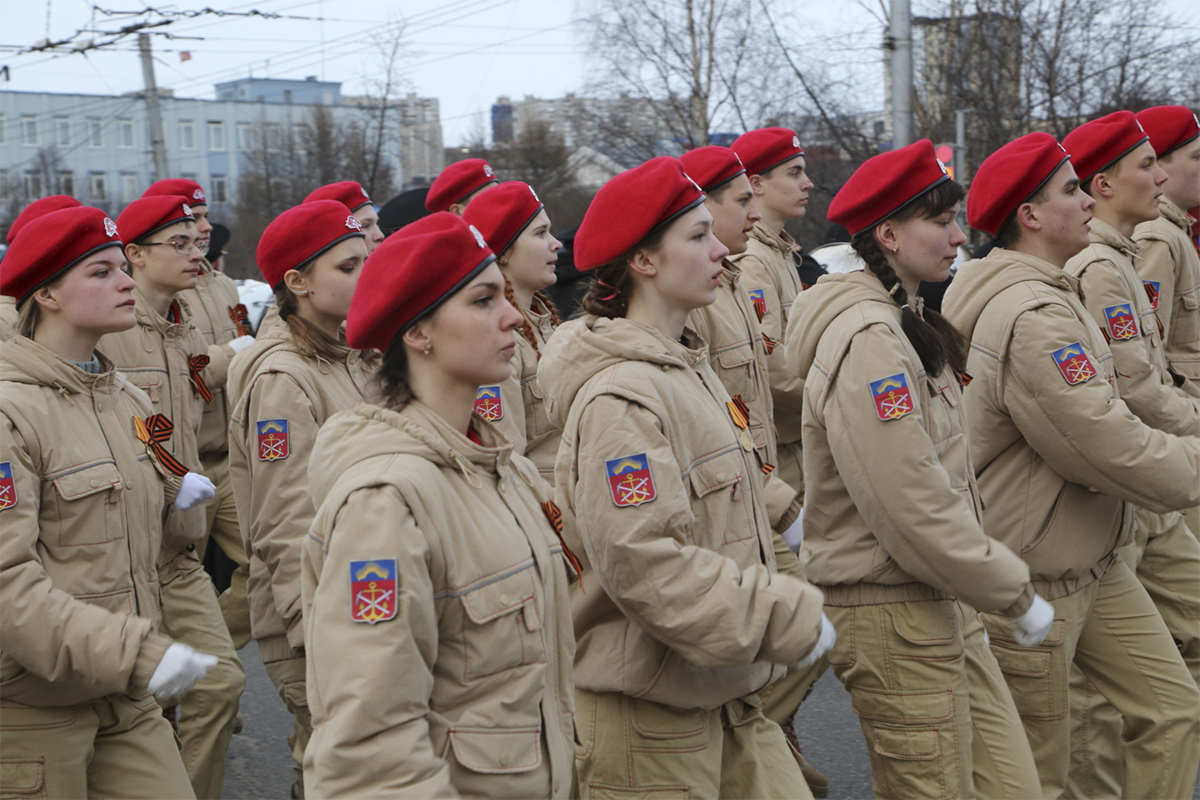
Russia's Young Army in Murmansk, 2018

In 1974, a 35.5-meter (116 ft) tall statue Alyosha, depicting a Soviet World War II soldier, was installed on a 7-meter (23 ft) high foundation. The Hotel Arctic opened in 1984, becoming the tallest building above the Arctic Circle.

On 1 January 2015, the territory of Murmansk was expanded when the urban-type settlement of Roslyakovo, previously under the jurisdiction of the closed administrative-territorial formation of Severomorsk, was abolished and its territory merged into Murmansk.

== Administrative and municipal status ==
Within the framework of administrative divisions, it is incorporated as the City of Murmansk—an administrative unit with the status equal to that of the districts. As a municipal division, the City of Murmansk is incorporated as Murmansk Urban Okrug.

=== City divisions ===
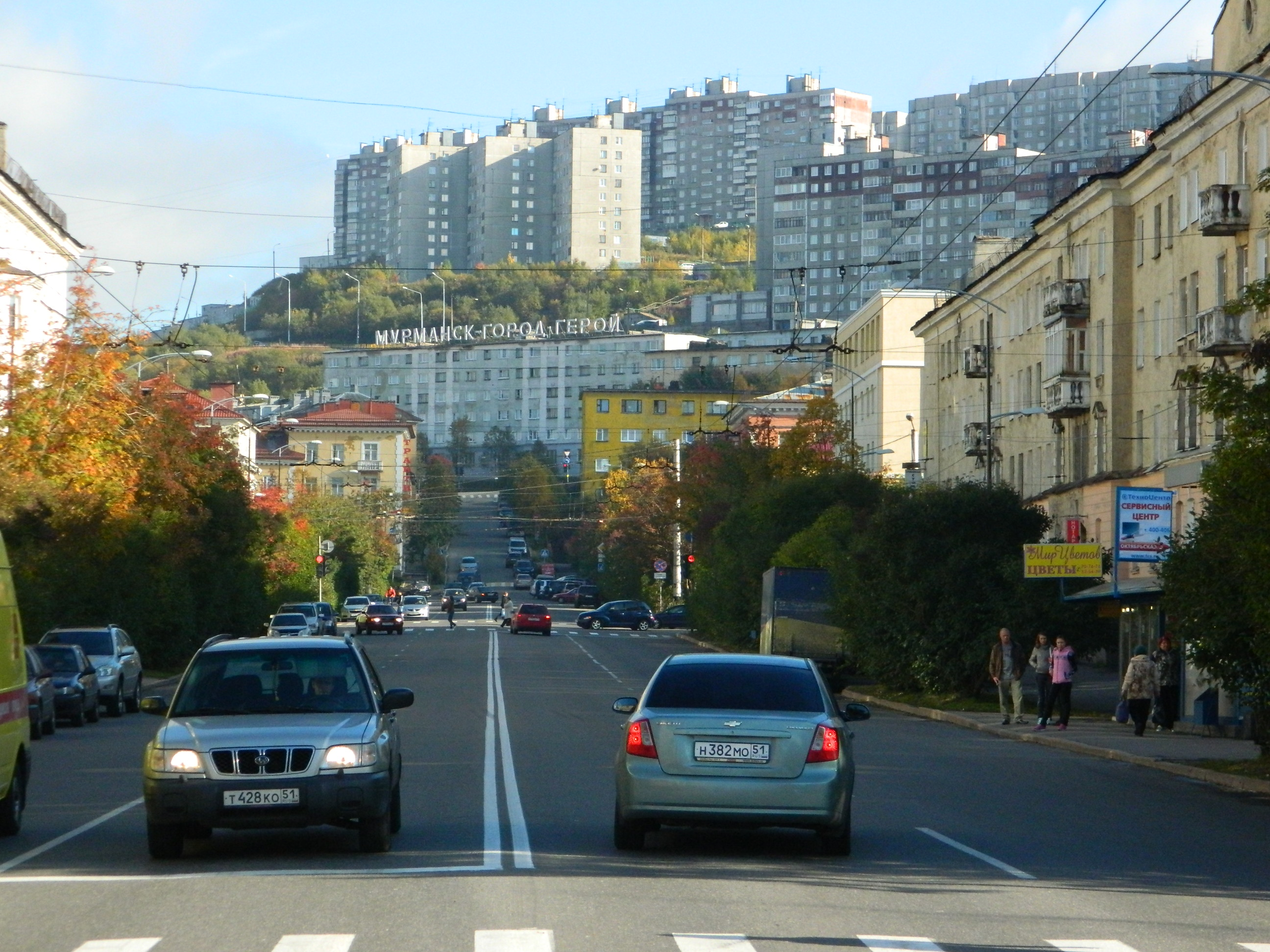
Lenin Avenue

As of 2012, the city is divided into three administrative okrugs:

- Leninsky (Ленинский (Lenin))
- Oktyabrsky (Октябрьский (October))
- Pervomaysky (Первомайский (First May))

City districts were established in Murmansk for the first time by the Decree of the Presidium of the Supreme Soviet of the Russian SFSR of 20 April 1939; at the time, three city districts (Kirovsky, Leninsky, and Mikoyanovsky) were created. They were abolished on 2 June 1948. The same city districts were created for the second time on 23 June 1951.

Mikoyanovsky City District was renamed Oktyabrsky on 30 October 1957, but on 30 September 1958, all three city districts were again abolished. On 10 June 1967, two city districts were created (Leninsky and Oktyabrsky); Pervomaysky City District was split from Oktyabrsky on 21 February 1975. In the Charter of the Hero City of Murmansk, adopted on 17 December 1995, the districts started to be referred to as administrative okrugs.

The main square of the city is Five Corners, Murmansk.

== Geography ==
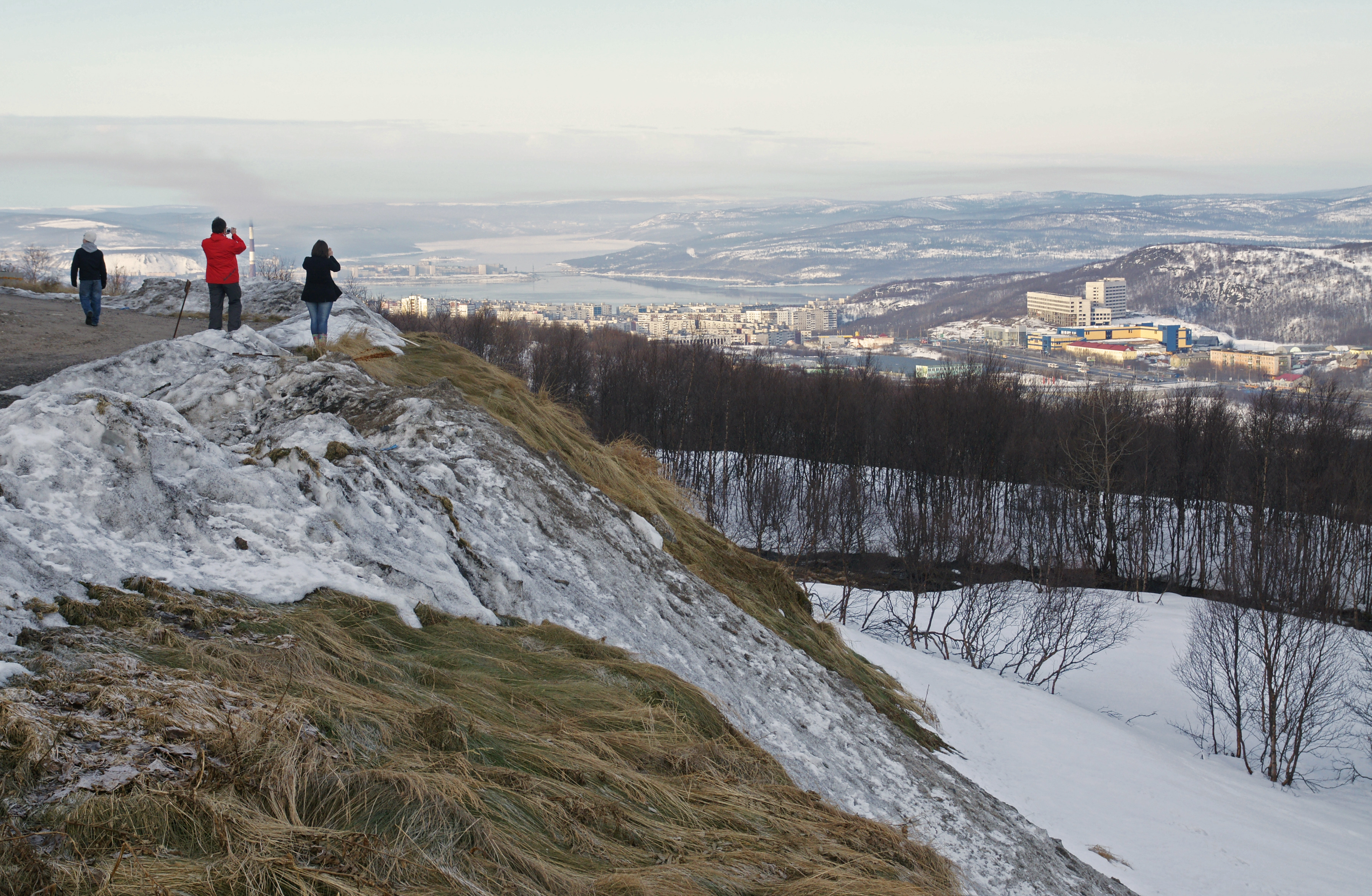
View of Murmansk

=== Climate ===
Murmansk experiences a subarctic climate (Köppen Dfc), with long and cold (though average by arctic standards) winters and short, cool summers. In the city, freezing temperatures are routinely experienced from October to May. Average temperatures exceed 0 degrees Celsius only from May through October. The average low during the coldest part of the year in Murmansk is approximately −14 °C (7 °F). However, temperatures routinely plunge below −20 °C (−4 °F) during the winter.

Murmansk's brief summer is mild, with average highs in July exceeding +17 °C (63 °F). The city is slightly wetter during the summer than the winter and receives an annual average of just under 500 mm (20 in) of precipitation.

The "midnight sun" is above the horizon from 22 May to 23 July (63 days), and the period with continuous darkness is somewhat shorter — the polar night lasts from 2 December to 10 January (40 days).

Extreme temperatures range from −39.4 °C (−38.9 °F) on 6 January 1985, and 27 January 1999, up to 32.9 °C (91.2 °F) on 9 July 1972; the record cold daily maximum is −36.1 °C (−33.0 °F), set on 6 January 1985, while, conversely, the record warm daily minimum is 21.3 °C (70.3 °F) last set on 9 July 1972.

Murmansk has been affected by global warming in recent decades, similar to other Arctic locations. For example, December 2007 had an average high of 0.8 °C (33.4 °F), while a 2.3 °C (36.1 °F) average high was measured for March 2007. Summer has also been affected, with a 19.1 °C (66.4 °F) average high for June 2013, and a 24.3 °C (75.7 °F) average high during July 2018.

Climate data for Murmansk (1991–2020, extremes 1918–present)
Month	Jan	Feb	Mar	Apr	May	Jun	Jul	Aug	Sep	Oct	Nov	Dec	Year
Record high °C (°F)	7.0 (44.6)	6.6 (43.9)	9.0 (48.2)	17.6 (63.7)	29.4 (84.9)	30.8 (87.4)	32.9 (91.2)	30.2 (86.4)	24.2 (75.6)	15.0 (59.0)	11.7 (53.1)	7.2 (45.0)	32.9 (91.2)
Mean maximum °C (°F)	1.7 (35.1)	2.0 (35.6)	4.5 (40.1)	10.3 (50.5)	19.1 (66.4)	24.4 (75.9)	26.9 (80.4)	23.9 (75.0)	17.8 (64.0)	9.7 (49.5)	3.9 (39.0)	2.9 (37.2)	27.7 (81.9)
Mean daily maximum °C (°F)	−6.5 (20.3)	−6.4 (20.5)	−1.9 (28.6)	2.9 (37.2)	8.4 (47.1)	13.8 (56.8)	17.7 (63.9)	15.3 (59.5)	10.7 (51.3)	3.6 (38.5)	−1.8 (28.8)	−4.1 (24.6)	4.3 (39.7)
Daily mean °C (°F)	−9.6 (14.7)	−9.3 (15.3)	−5.1 (22.8)	−0.3 (31.5)	4.6 (40.3)	9.4 (48.9)	13.2 (55.8)	11.5 (52.7)	7.6 (45.7)	1.6 (34.9)	−4.0 (24.8)	−6.8 (19.8)	1.1 (34.0)
Mean daily minimum °C (°F)	−12.7 (9.1)	−12.3 (9.9)	−8.2 (17.2)	−3.3 (26.1)	1.5 (34.7)	5.9 (42.6)	9.6 (49.3)	8.3 (46.9)	5.1 (41.2)	−0.3 (31.5)	−6.2 (20.8)	−9.6 (14.7)	−1.8 (28.8)
Mean minimum °C (°F)	−25.1 (−13.2)	−24.4 (−11.9)	−19.1 (−2.4)	−12.1 (10.2)	−3.8 (25.2)	1.2 (34.2)	5.2 (41.4)	3.2 (37.8)	−0.4 (31.3)	−8.1 (17.4)	−16.4 (2.5)	−20.7 (−5.3)	−28.5 (−19.3)
Record low °C (°F)	−39.4 (−38.9)	−38.6 (−37.5)	−32.6 (−26.7)	−24.0 (−11.2)	−10.3 (13.5)	−2.8 (27.0)	1.7 (35.1)	−2.0 (28.4)	−10.1 (13.8)	−21.2 (−6.2)	−32.2 (−26.0)	−34.9 (−30.8)	−39.4 (−38.9)
Average precipitation mm (inches)	34 (1.3)	24 (0.9)	29 (1.1)	29 (1.1)	37 (1.5)	56 (2.2)	66 (2.6)	71 (2.8)	54 (2.1)	56 (2.2)	36 (1.4)	37 (1.5)	529 (20.8)
Average extreme snow depth cm (inches)	26 (10)	28 (11)	30 (12)	19 (7.5)	2 (0.8)	0 (0)	0 (0)	0 (0)	0 (0)	3 (1.2)	11 (4.3)	19 (7.5)	30 (12)
Average rainy days	2	2	3	9	18	22	22	22	24	17	5	3	149
Average snowy days	27	28	24	19	14	0	0	0	0	20	24	27	183
Average relative humidity (%)	84	83	79	73	72	70	75	79	80	83	86	85	79
Mean monthly sunshine hours	1.9	44.5	133.4	188.6	205.2	234.8	249.4	165.4	108.3	51.7	5.8	0	1,389
Source 1: Pogoda.ru.net
Source 2: NOAA Infoclimat

Sea temperature data for Murmansk
Month	Jan	Feb	Mar	Apr	May	Jun	Jul	Aug	Sep	Oct	Nov	Dec	Year
Average sea temperature °C (°F)	3.4 (38.12)	2.5 (36.5)	1.9 (35.42)	2.2 (35.96)	3.9 (35.96)	7.1 (44.78)	10.5 (50.9)	10.9 (51.62)	9 (48.2)	7 (44.6)	5.3 (41.54)	4.6 (40.28)	5.69 (42.245)

== Demographics ==
Historical population
Year	Pop.	±%
1926	8,716	—
1939	117,069	+1243.2%
1959	221,874	+89.5%
1970	308,642	+39.1%
1979	380,817	+23.4%
1989	468,039	+22.9%
2002	336,137	−28.2%
2010	307,257	−8.6%
2021	270,384	−12.0%
Source: Census data

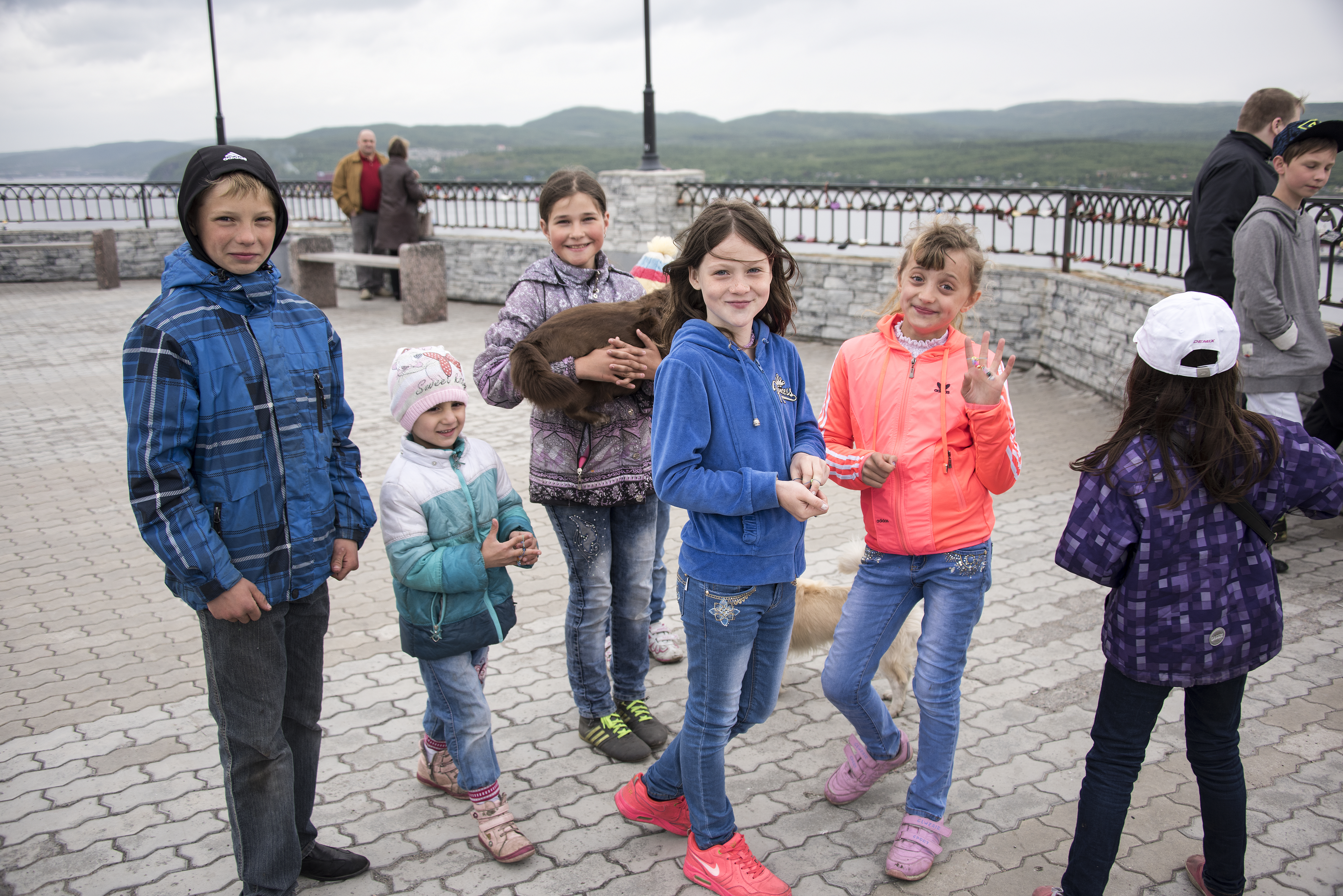
Children in Murmansk

The population of the city, according to the 2010 Census, was 307,257 persons, of these, 141,130 were men (45.9%) and 166,127 were women (54.1%). Murmansk's population is down significantly from the 468,039 persons recorded in the 1989 Census. Since the collapse of the Soviet Union, the city has been consistently losing population, as the extensive military facilities the city is built around have decreased. Ethnic Russians make up the majority of the population, but Ukrainian and Belarusian minorities also live in the city.

Ethnic composition (2010):

- Russians – 89.6%
- Ukrainians – 4.6%
- Belarusians – 1.6%
- Tatars – 0.8%
- Azerbaijanis – 0.7%
- Others – 2.6%

== Politics ==
In November 2010, direct mayoral elections were abolished; they were reinstituted in January 2014, but with the introduction of the New Law of Self-Governance (Russian: новому закону о местном самоуправлении) introduced under Governor Andrey Chibis means that mayors are once again chosen indirectly, through a Council of Deputies. The current mayor, as of November 2025, is Ivan Lebedev, who assumed the position after being selected from a group of two candidates by the Council following the resignation of the previous mayor Yuri Serdechkin in July 2025. He was acting head of the city between July 2025 and his election.

== Museums and monuments ==
Murmansk has two main museums: Murmansk Oblast Museum and Murmansk Oblast Art Museum; there are also several small museums. There are three professional theaters, libraries, and an aquarium in Murmansk. Murmansk is the venue of the decommissioned Lenin which is now a museum ship. The massive Alyosha Monument (official name being Defenders of the Soviet Arctic during the Great Patriotic War) overlooks the city of Murmansk.

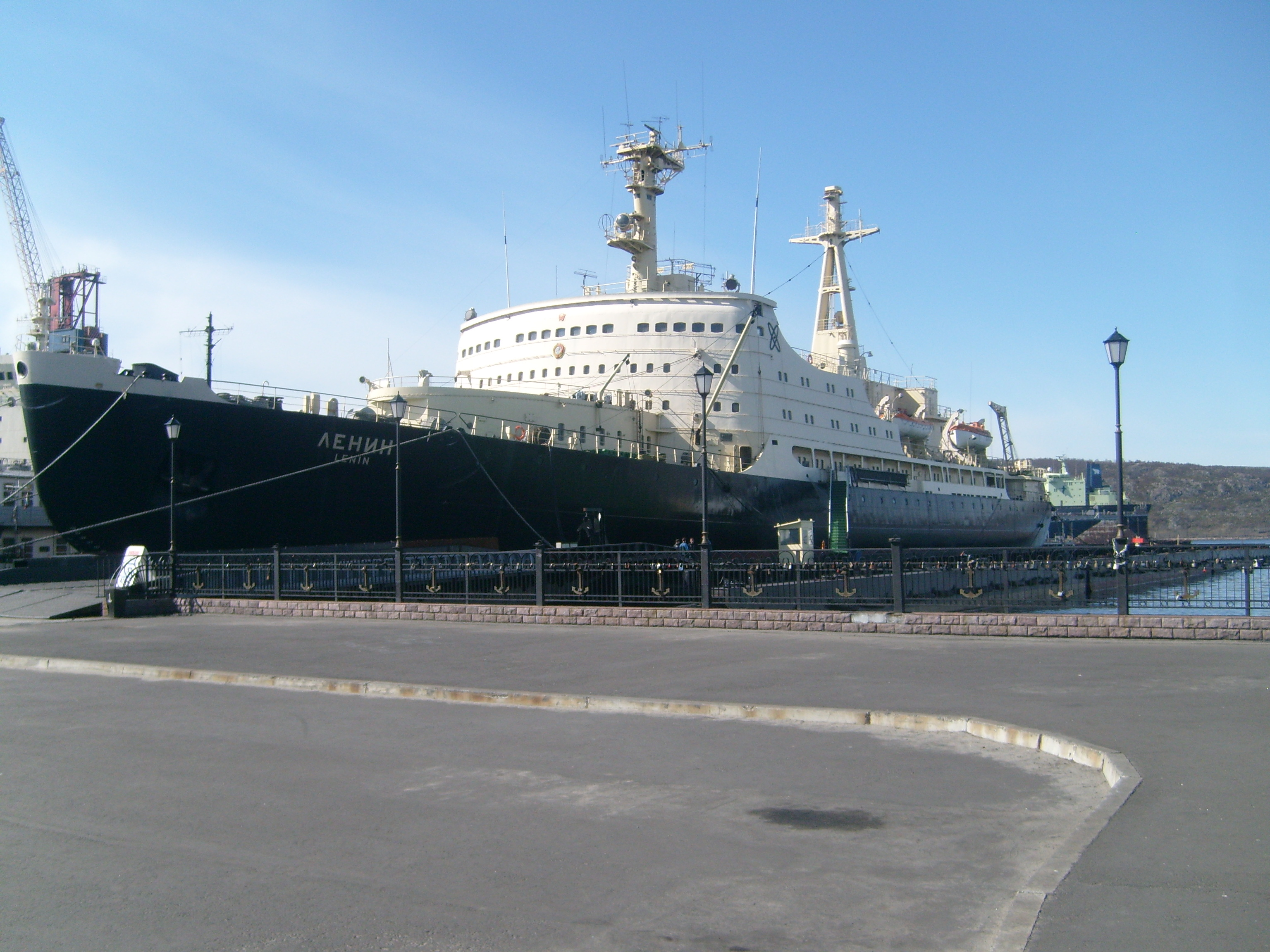
Lenin, converted into a museum ship

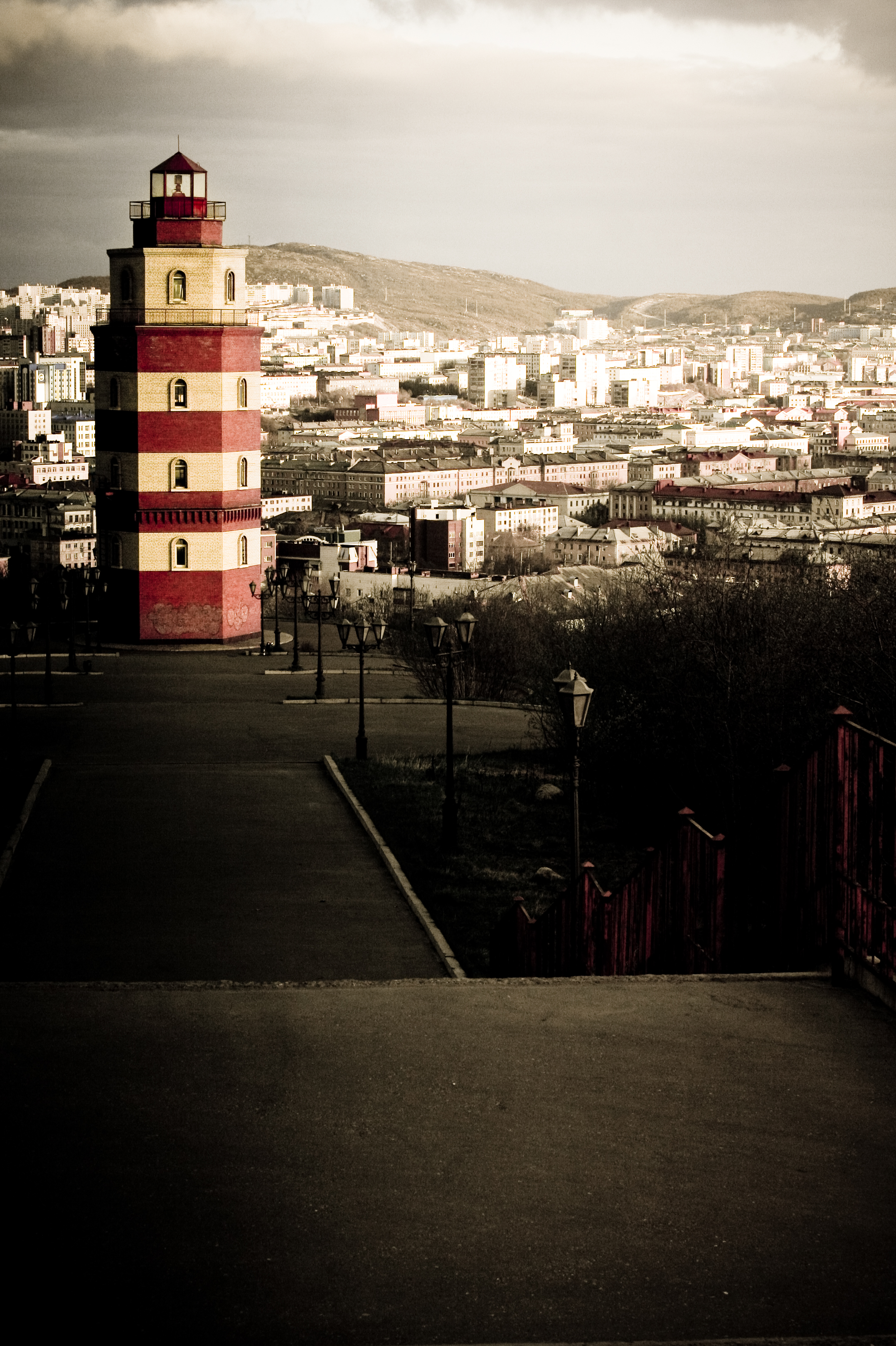
Monument of sailors in Murmansk

Alyosha, the second tallest statue in Russia

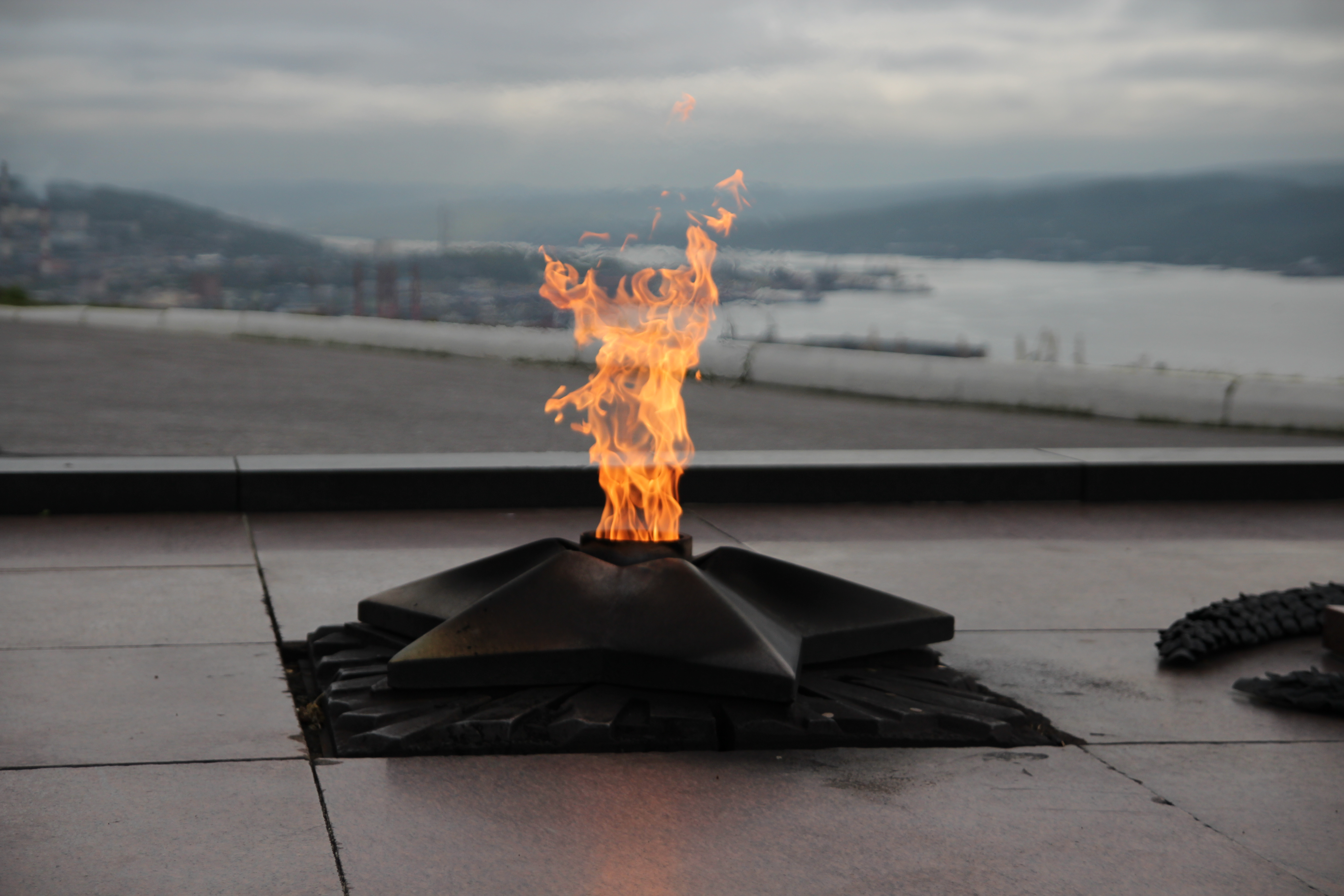
Eternal flame at the Alyosha monument

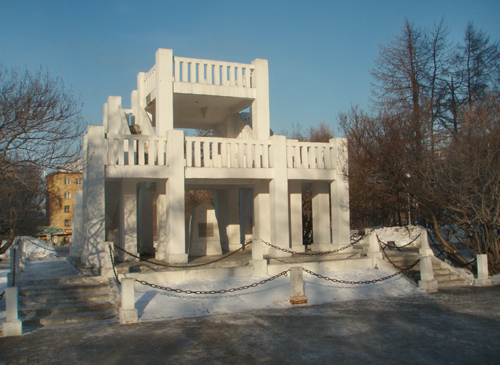
Monument to the victims of the intervention of 1918–1920, Murmansk

== Culture ==
There are three professional theaters in Murmansk. The oldest is the Murmansk Puppetry, which opened in 1933. The largest in the city was the Murmansk Regional Drama Theater, which opened in 1939. The Drama Theater of the Northern Fleet was opened in 1946.

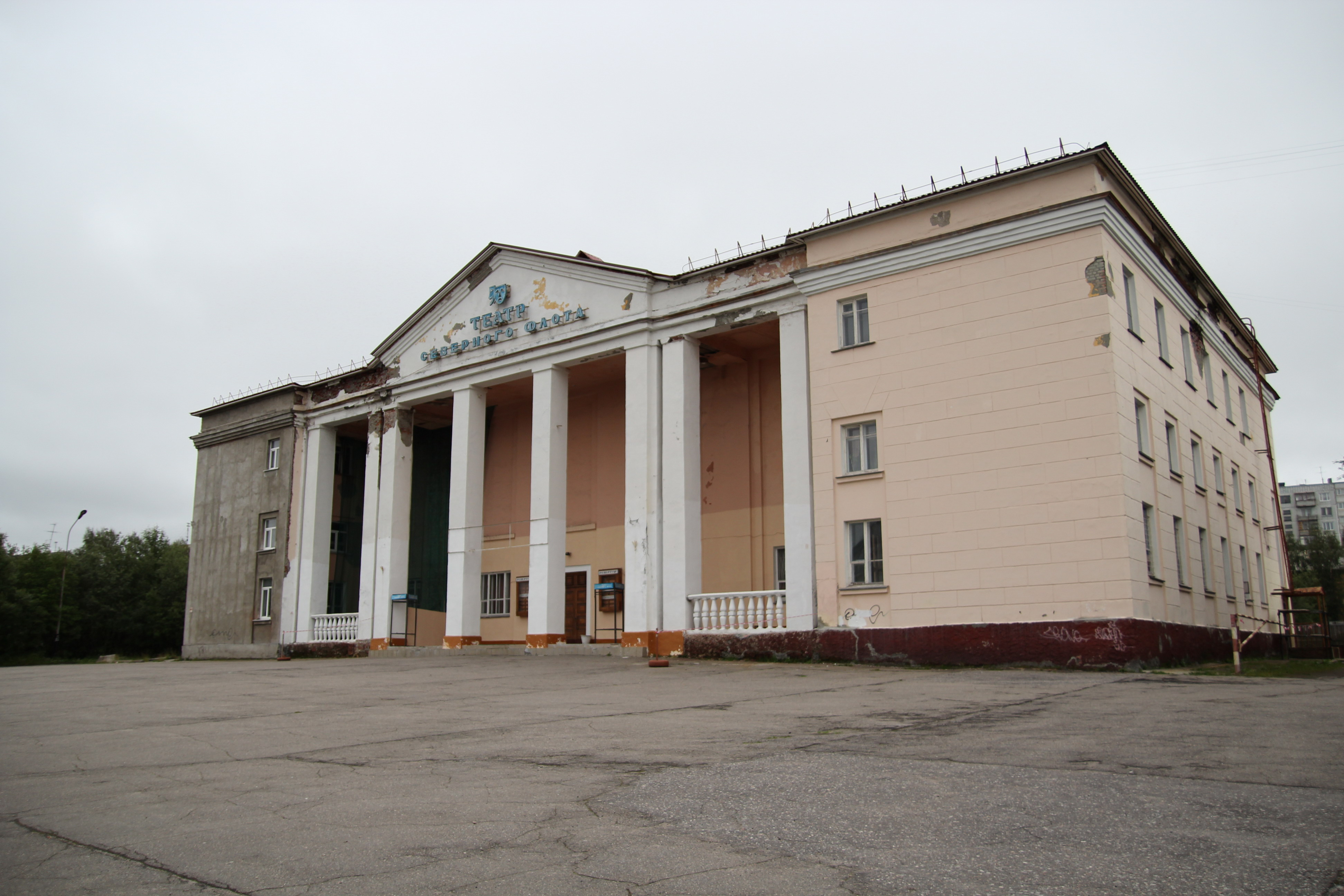
Drama Theater of the Northern Fleet

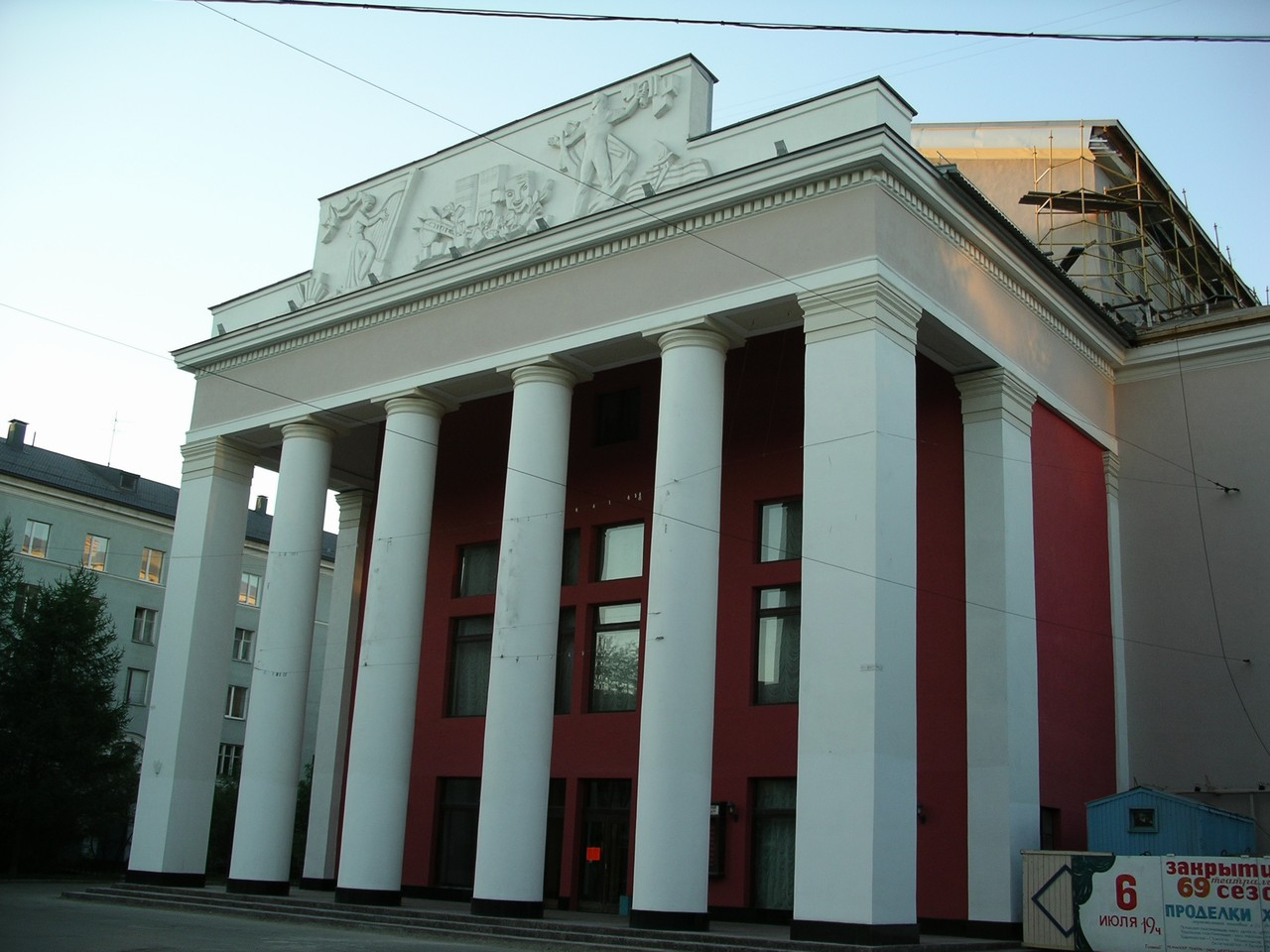
Murmansk Regional Drama Theater

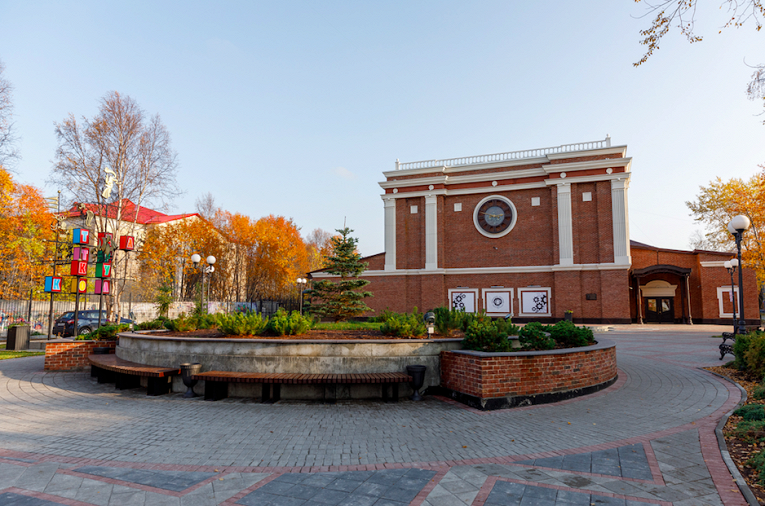
Murmansk Puppetry

The unofficial anthem of Murmansk is "My Beloved Arctic". As of 2012, it's played at the train station to signal the arrival of trains, and as of 2007 it's played at Murmansk's main square on the hour.

== Sports ==
The city's association football teams are FC Sever Murmansk, which played in the Russian Second Division until 2014 when it folded due to financial difficulties, and FC Murmansk, a football team founded in 2022.

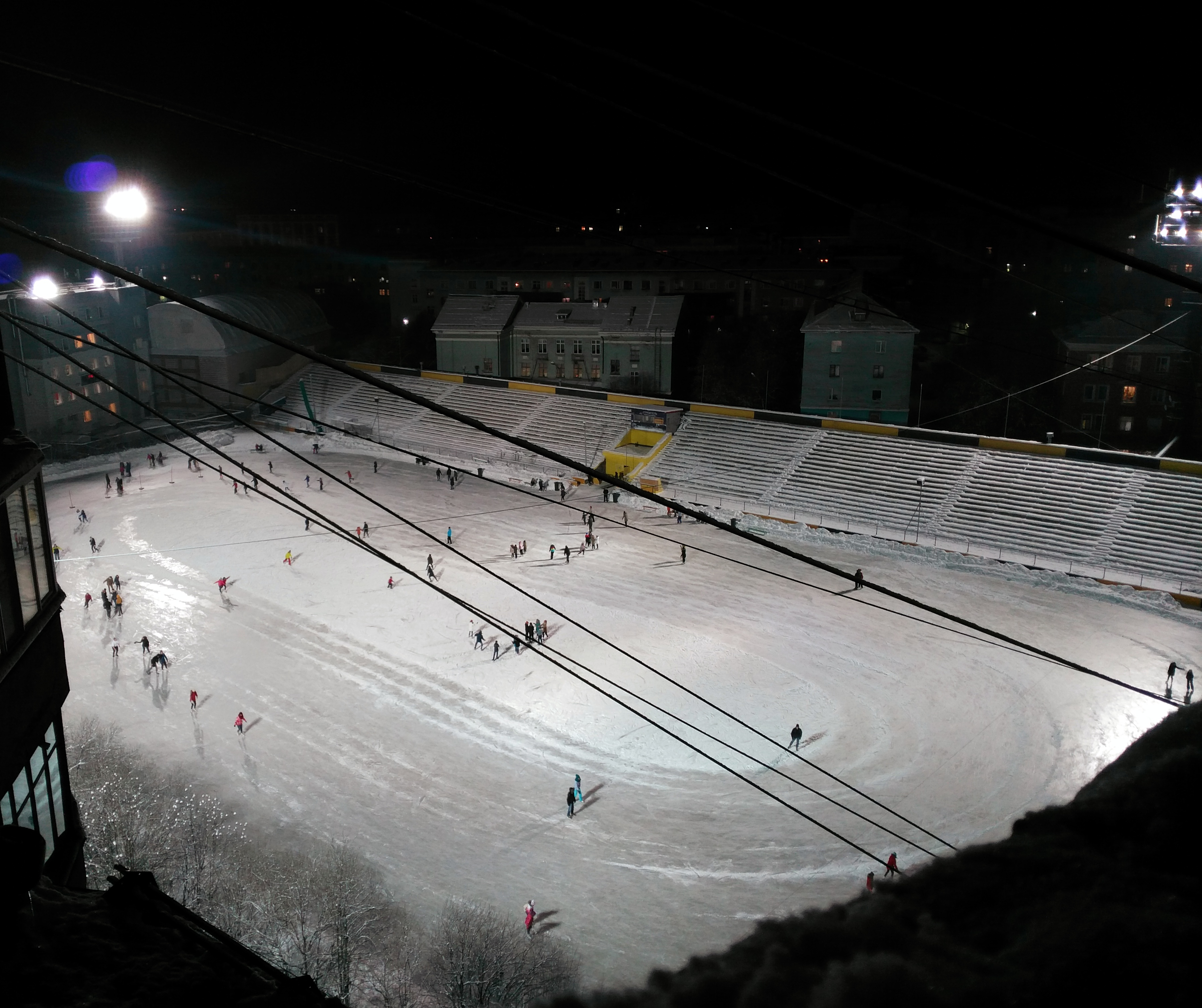
Stadium Stroitel

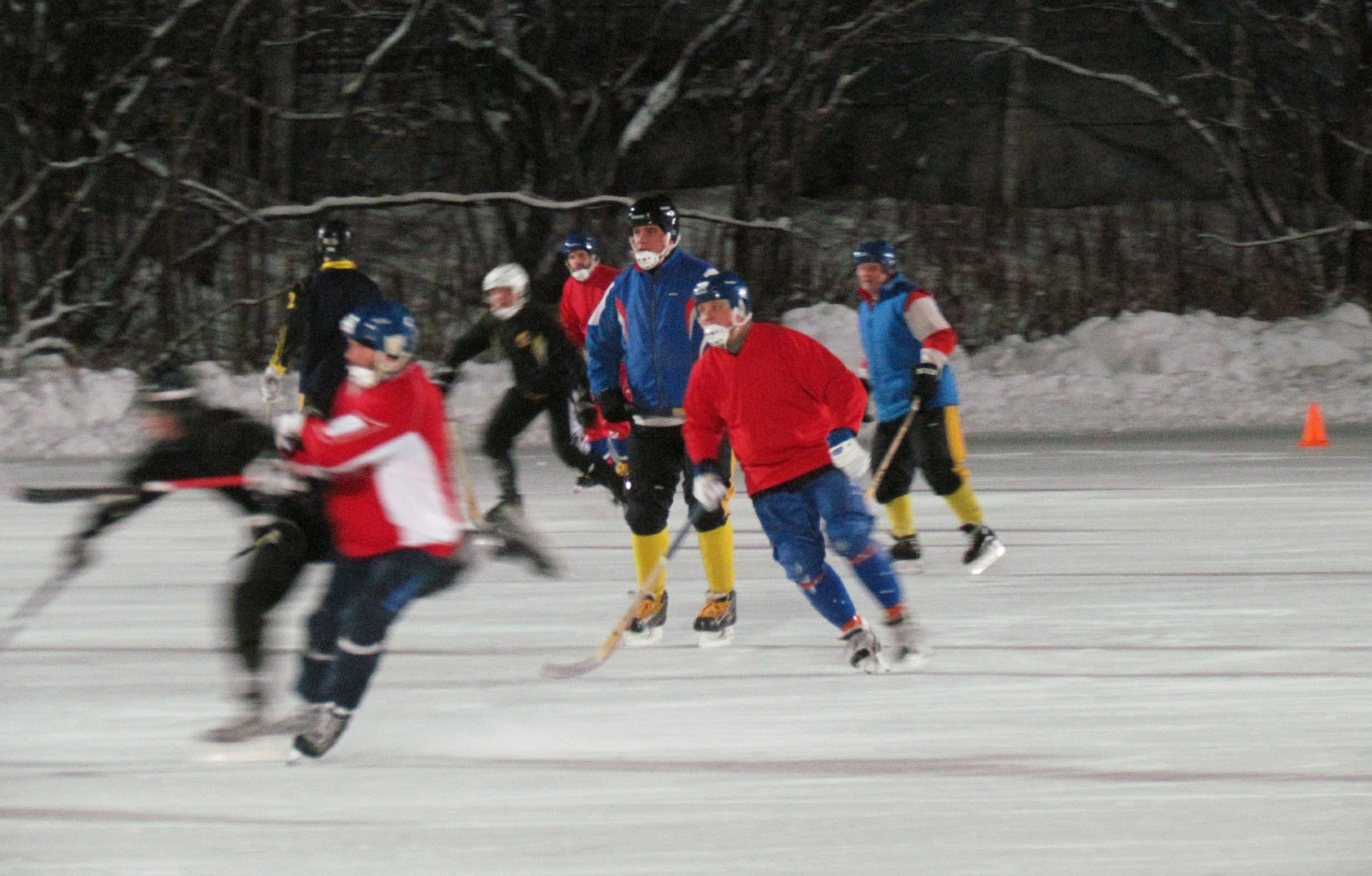
Bandy at Stroitel stadium

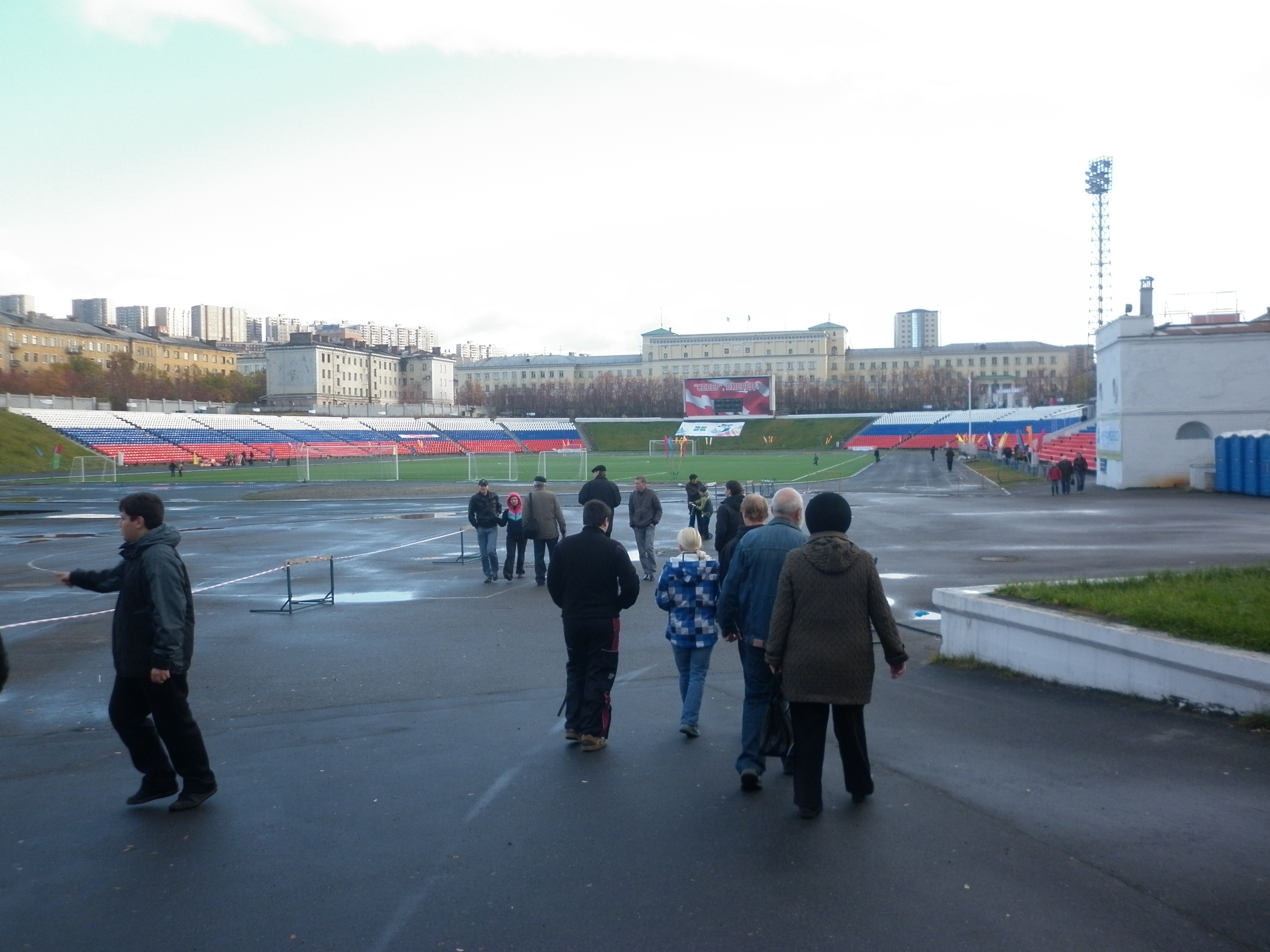
Trade Unions Central Stadium venue of FC Sever Murmansk

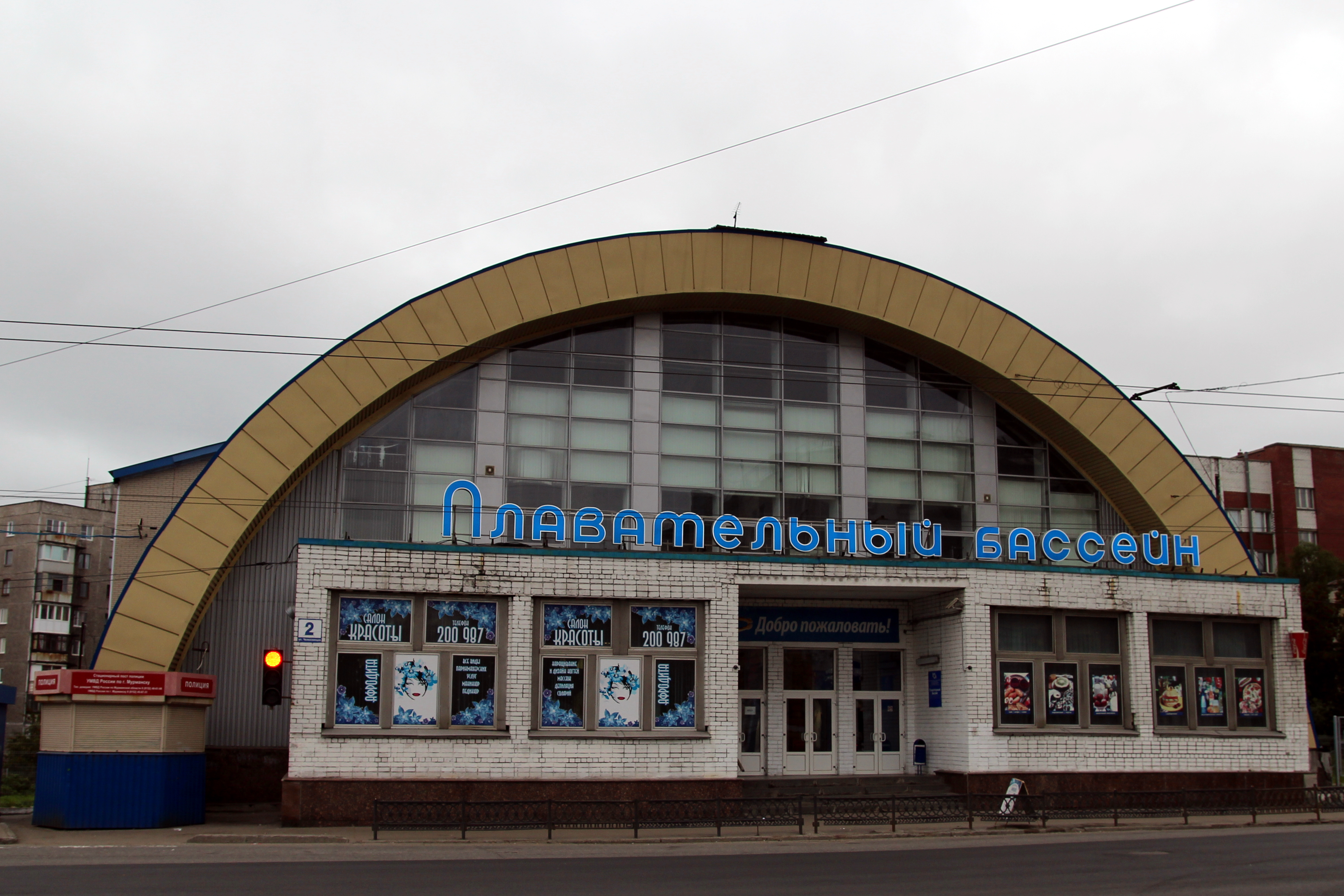
Murmansk Municipal Swimming Pool

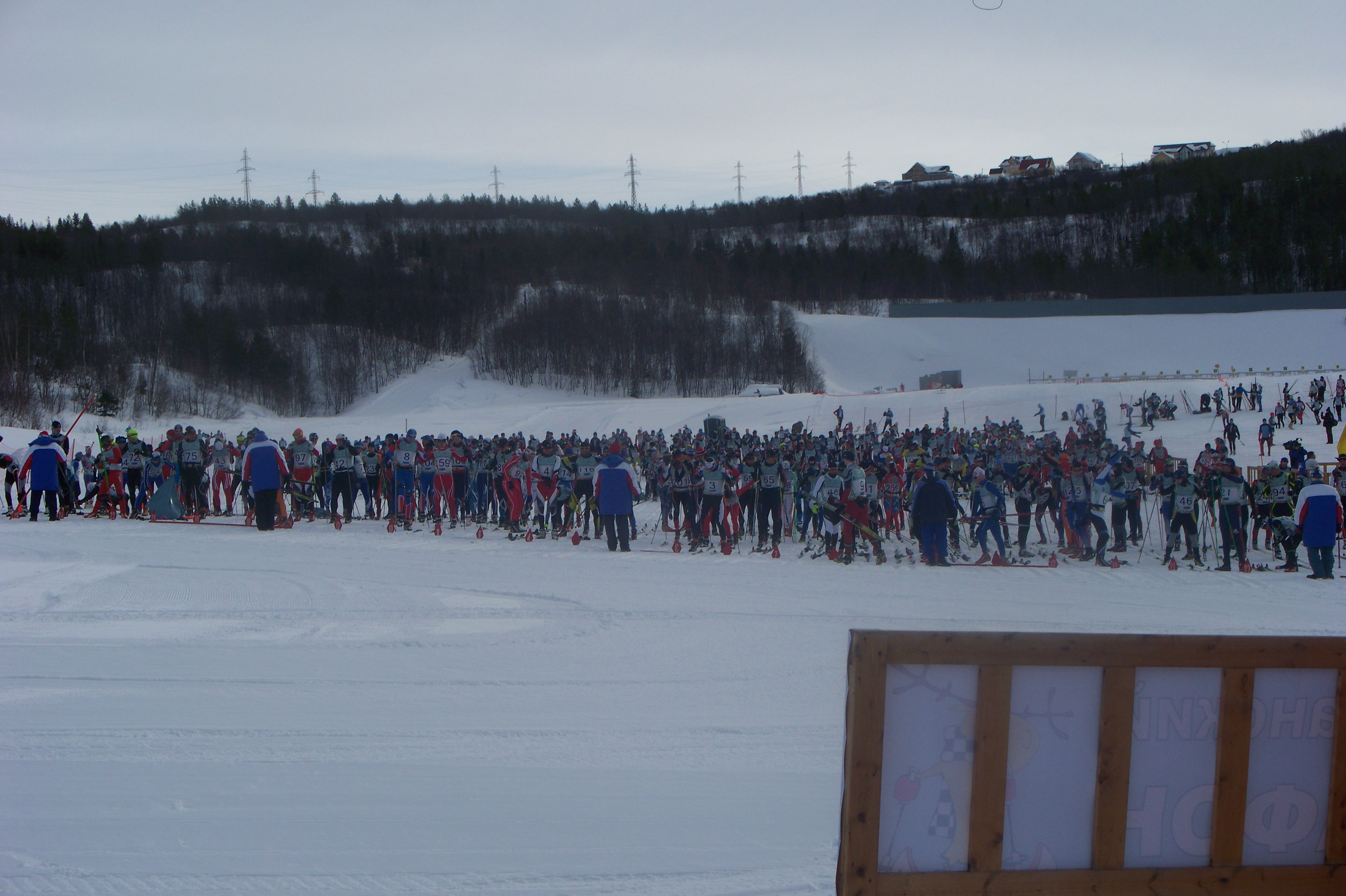
Polar Olympiada in 2013

Bandy club Murman has played in the Russian Bandy Super League, last in 2011–2012. Between 2012 and 2018, they were playing in the second tier Russian Bandy Supreme League, but will from the 2018–19 season be a Super League team again. Their home arena, Stadium Stroitel, has an audience capacity of 5,000.

The city is one of only three places with representation in the female league, through the team Arktika. Proximity to pole and its side effects, Polar Night, has brought sport festivals such as North Festival Polar Olympiad and Sun Festival. The former has been awarded every year since the inaugural tournament in 1934. Norway, Finland, Sweden, Ukraine, Belarus and the Baltic countries take part in the North Festival Polar Olympiad.

== Religion ==
To commemorate the 85th anniversary of the city's foundation, the snow-white Church of the Saviour on the Waters was modeled after the White Monuments of Vladimir and Suzdal and built on the shore for the sailors of Murmansk.

Fifteen religious associations have been registered in Murmansk. The largest is the Russian Orthodox Church. Murmansk is the center of its Murmansk and Monchegorsk diocese, as well as the Murmansk Metropolis. The city has about a dozen Orthodox churches. The department of the head of the diocese and the metropolis of Metropolitan Simon is located in St. Nicholas Cathedral.

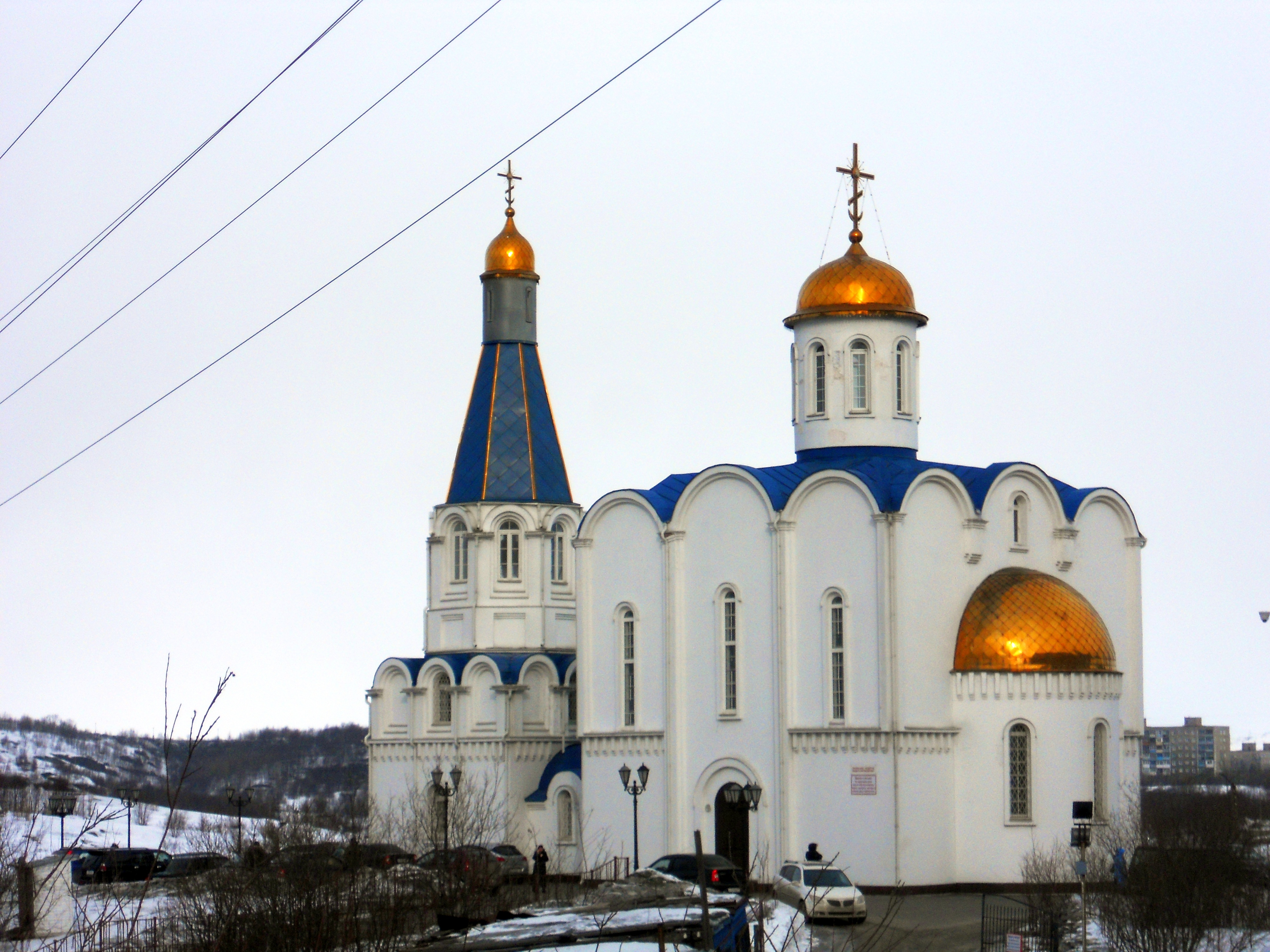
Church of the Saviour on the Waters, Murmansk

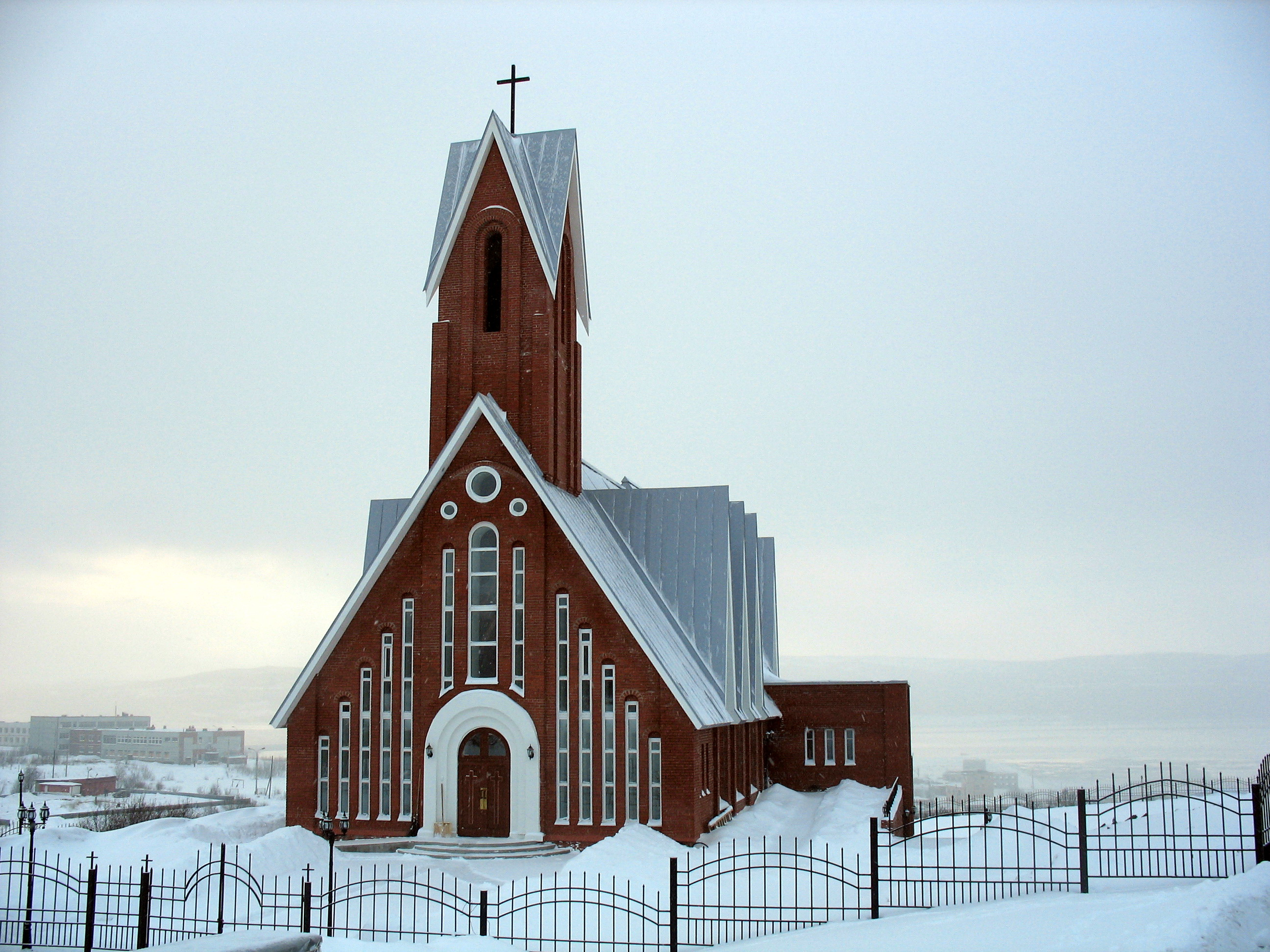
St. Michael the Archangel's Church

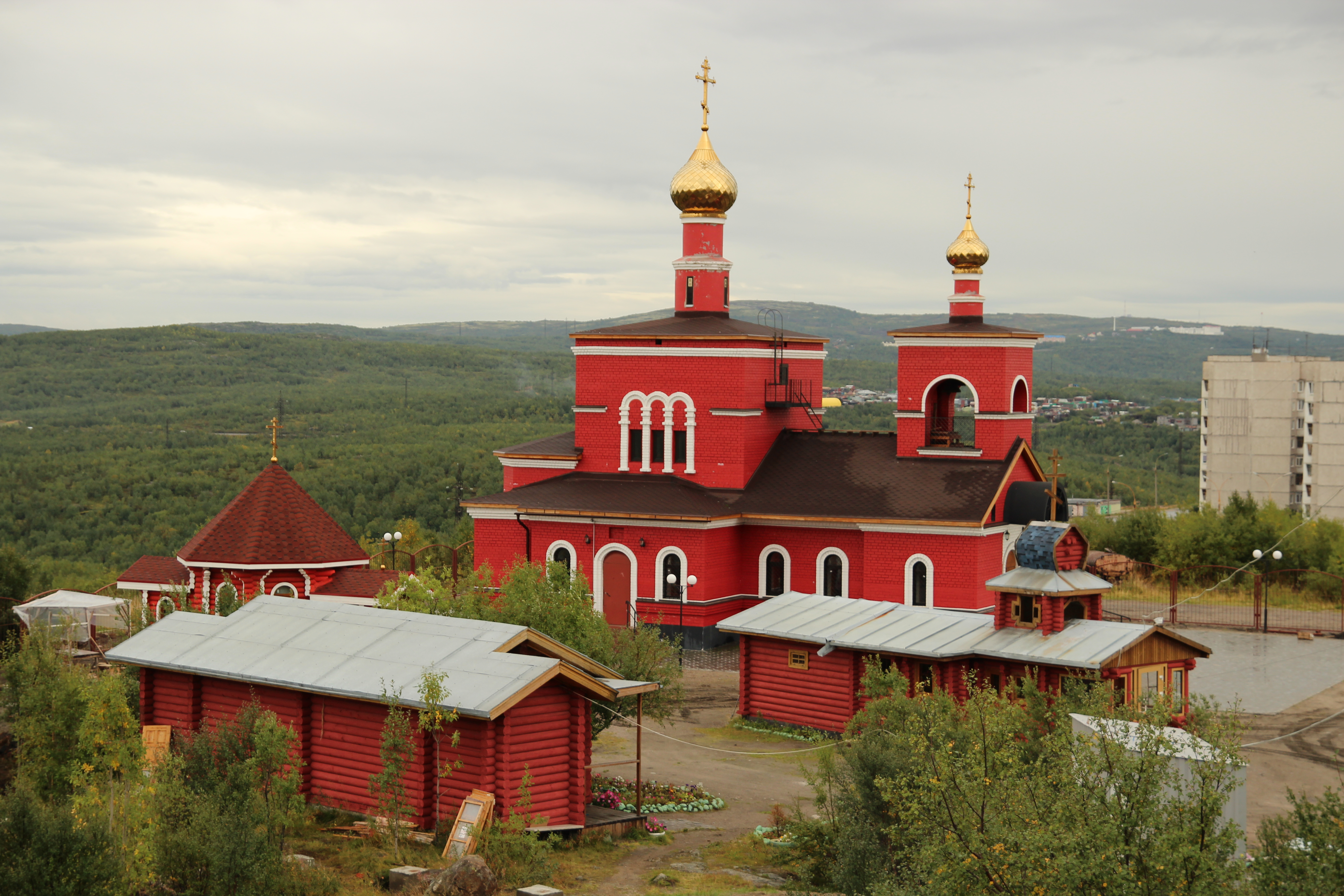
All Saints' Church

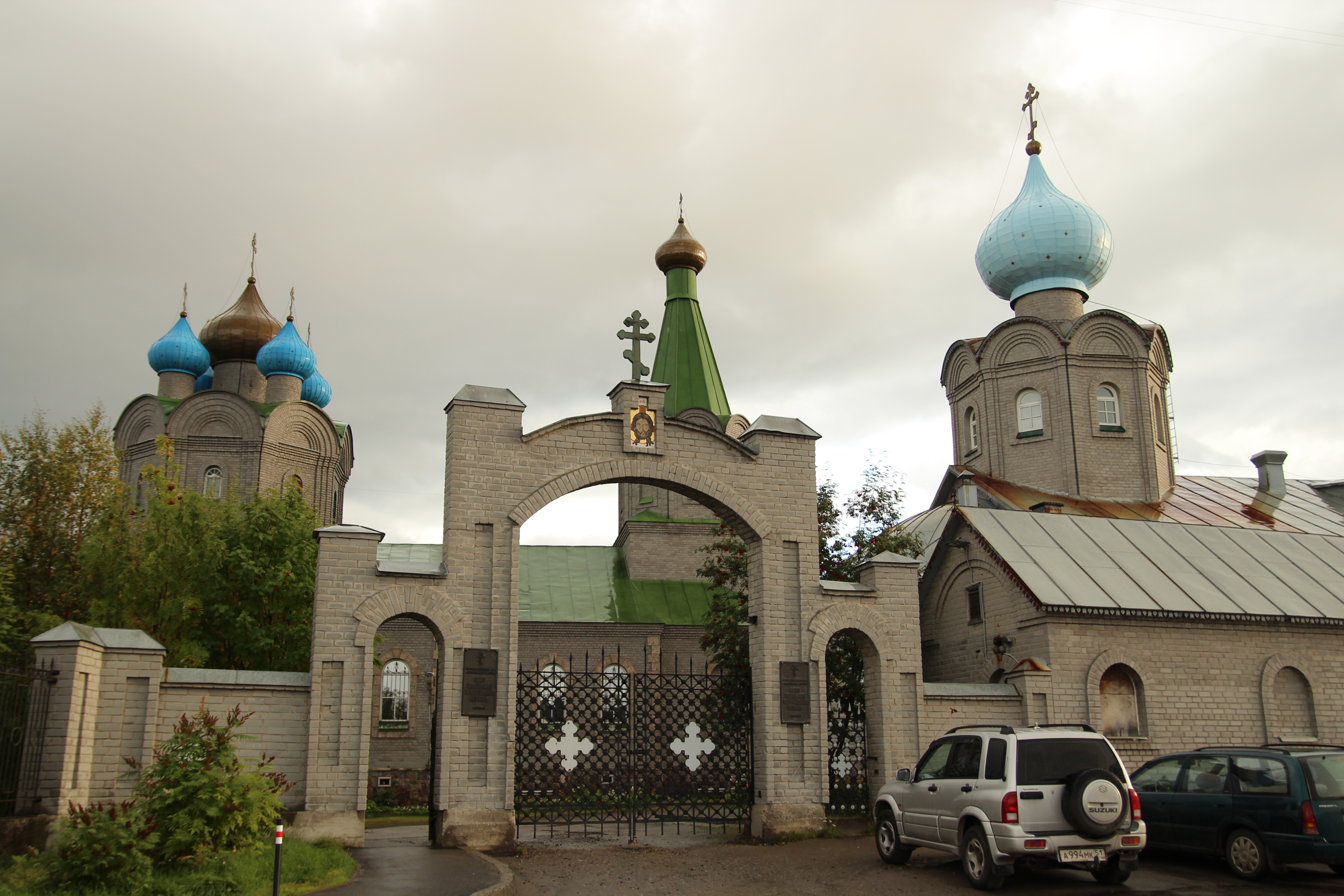
St. Nicholas Cathedral

== Economy ==
=== Media ===
Murmansk's evening newspaper is Vecherniy Murmansk; it has been published since 1991.

=== Transportation ===
The Port of Murmansk remains ice-free year round due to the warm North Atlantic Current and is an important fishing and shipping destination. The Port is also the headquarters of Sevmorput (Northern Sea Route) and the administration of Russian Arctic maritime transport. In 2018, the Russian government transferred the main responsibility for the Northern Sea Route to Rosatom which manages the Russian nuclear-powered icebreaker fleet based in Murmansk through its Atomflot subsidiary.

Murmansk is linked by the Kirov Railway to St. Petersburg and is linked to the rest of Russia by the M18 Kola Motorway. Murmansk Airport provides air links to Moscow and St. Petersburg.

Buses and electric trolleybuses provide local transport.

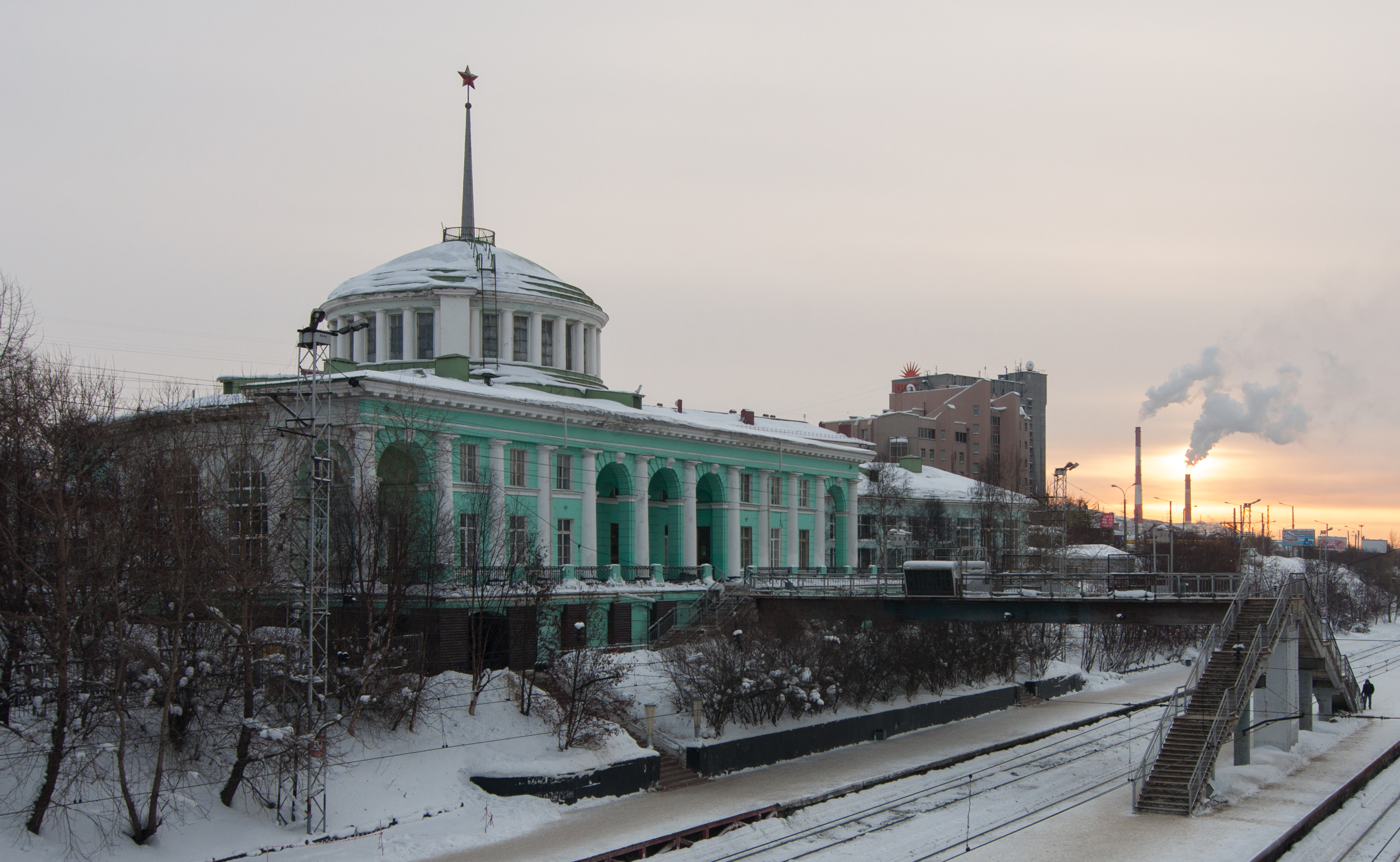
Murmansk central rail station

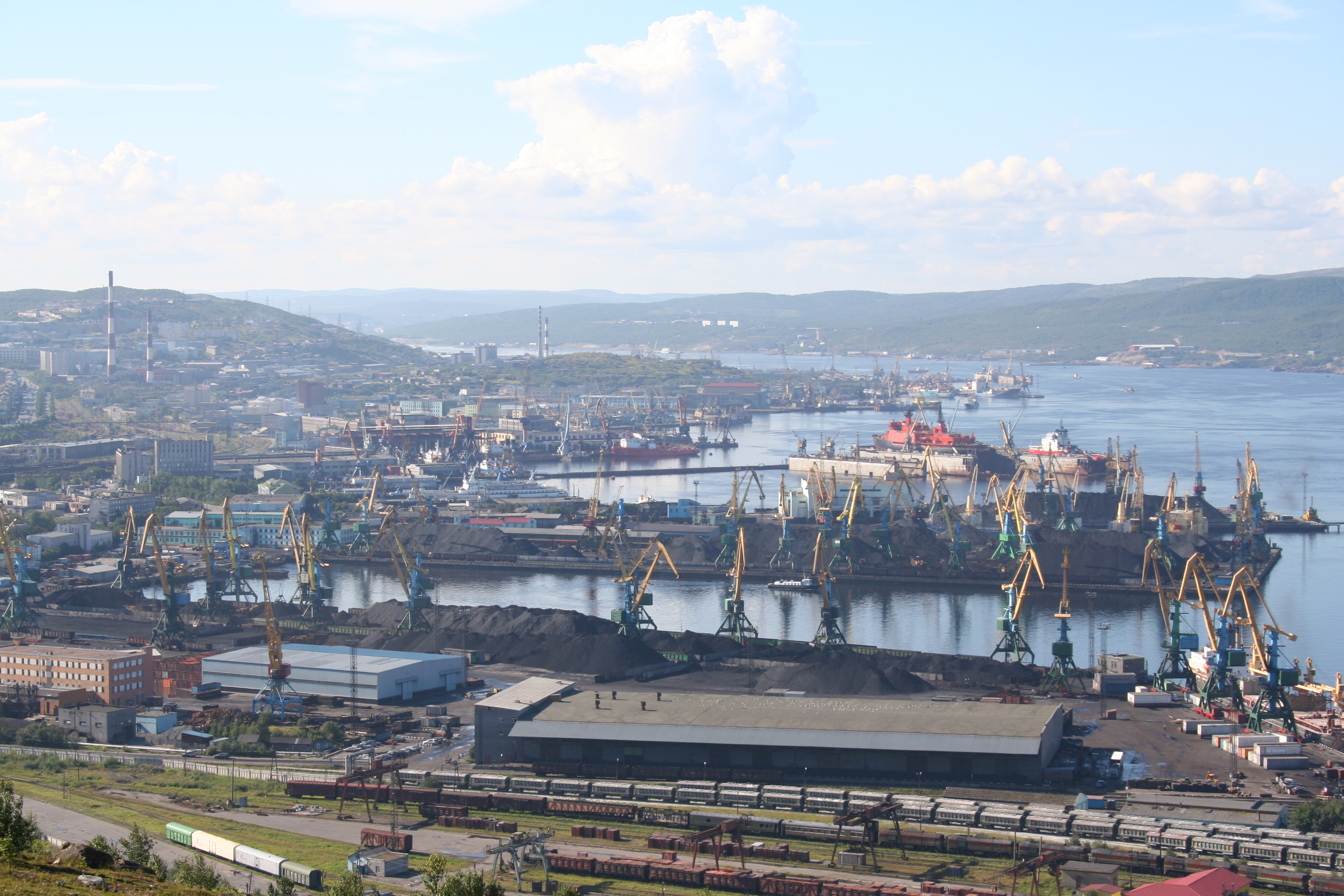
Port of Murmansk

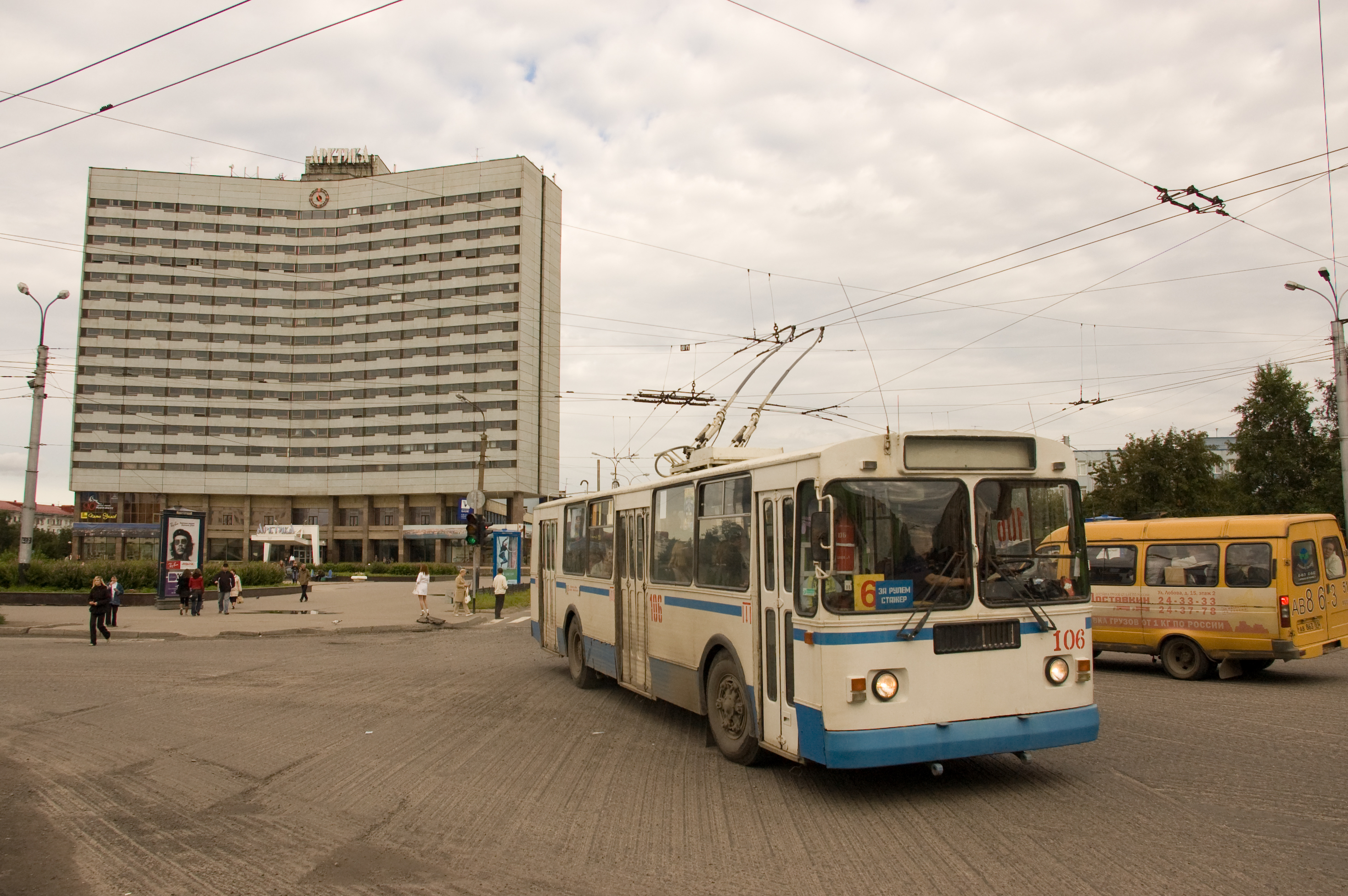
Trolley Ziu-682 with Azimut Hotel Murmansk in the background

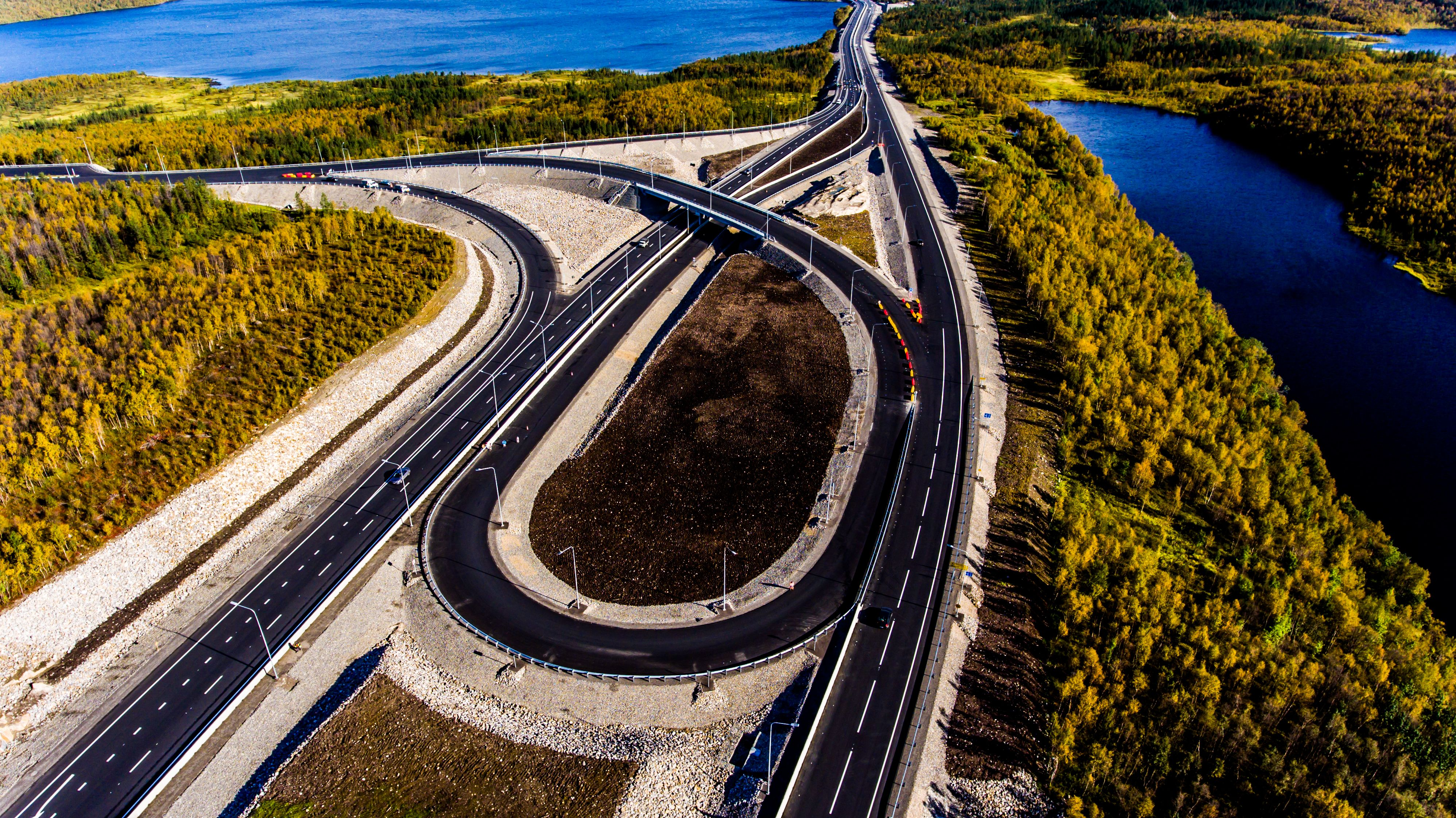
An interchange of the Eastern Bypass Road and Planernaya Street

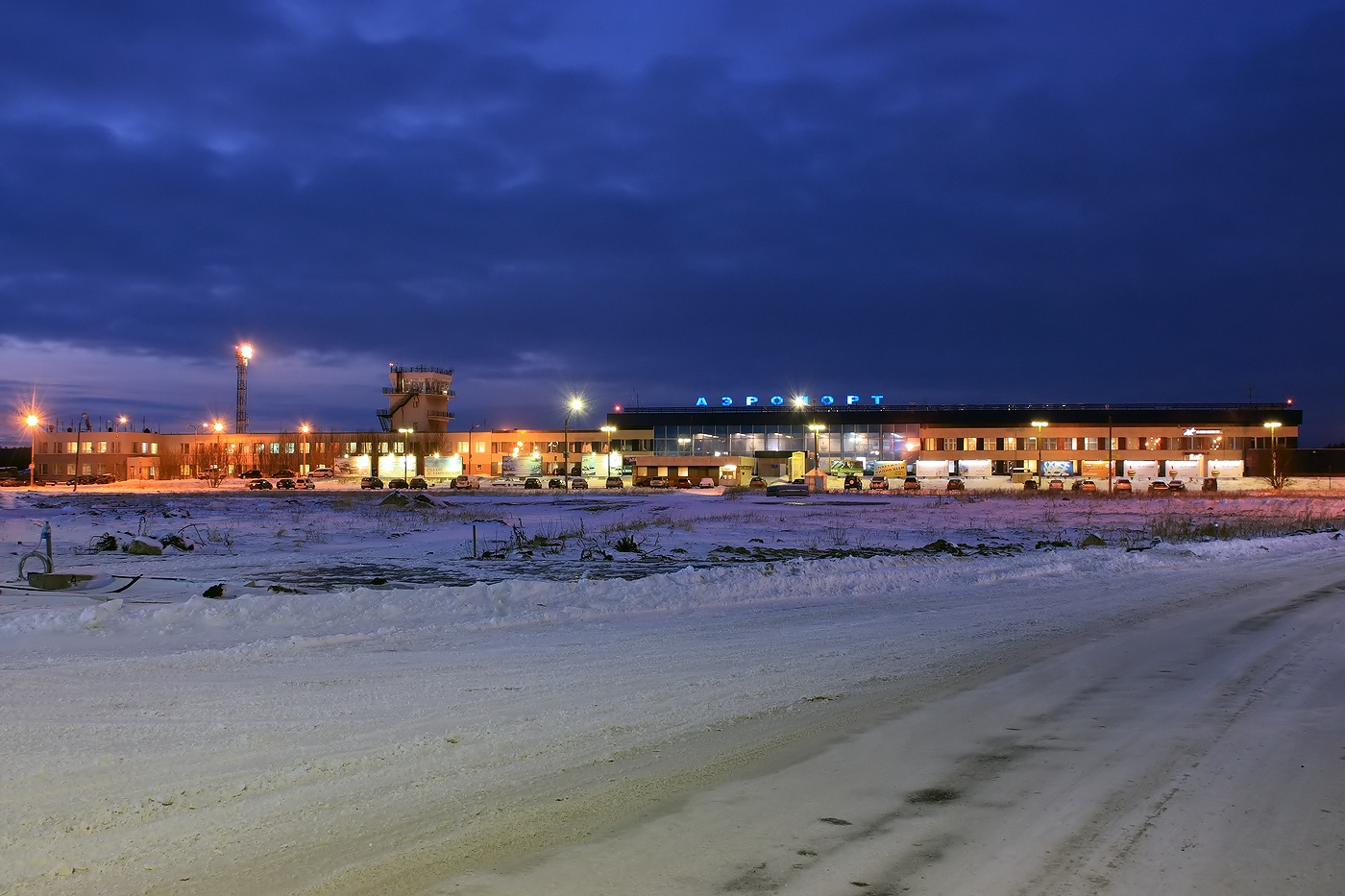
Murmansk Airport
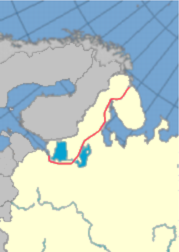
Kirov Railway connects Murmansk city and Saint Petersburg.

Arctic Bridge sea route linking Murmansk to the Canadian port of Churchill, Manitoba.

==== Arctic Bridge ====
Murmansk is set to be the Russian terminus of the Arctic Bridge, a sea route linking it to the Canadian port of Churchill, Manitoba. Even though the passage has not been fully tested for commercial shipping yet, Russian interest in this project (along with the Northwest Passage) is substantial, as the bridge will serve as a major trade route between North America, Europe and Asia.

== Education ==
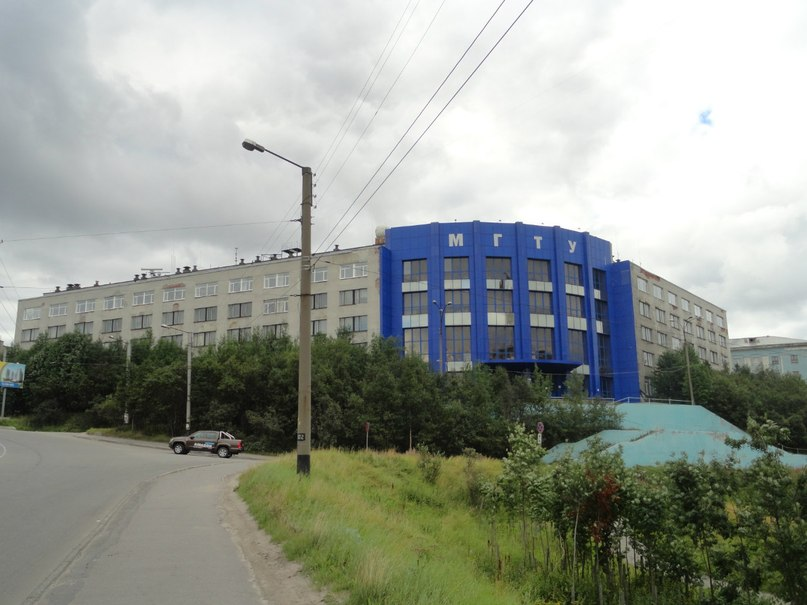
Murmansk State Technical University.

Murmansk is home to Murmansk State Technical University, the Murmansk Arctic State University (formerly Murmansk State Pedagogical University), the Murmansk Institute of Humanities and the Murmansk College of Arts (the only art school of the Kola Peninsula, formerly the 'Murmansk Music School'). The city has 86 primary schools and 56 secondary schools, two boarding schools, and three reform schools. There is also a branch of the Naval Academy in Murmansk, where cadets study to become officers of the Russian Navy.

== Twin towns – sister cities ==
Murmansk is twinned with:

- Luleå, Sweden (1972). Paused as a result of the 2022 Russian invasion of Ukraine.
- Vadsø, Norway (1973)
- Jacksonville, United States (1975)
- Groningen, Netherlands (1989)
- Alanya, Turkey (2014)
- Minsk, Belarus (2014)
- Harbin, China (2016)

== Notable people ==
- Nikita Alexeev (born 1981), ice hockey player
- Vitaliy Nikolayevich Bubentsov (born 1944), Russian artist
- Aleksey Goman (born 1983), pop singer
- Kate Grigorieva (born 1988), model
- Valentina Gunina (born 1989), chess grandmaster
- Halyna Hutchins (1979–2021), cinematographer and journalist
- Vladimir Konstantinov (born 1967), ice hockey player
- Irina Kovalenko (born 1984), model and Miss Russia winner
- Larisa Kruglova (born 1972), sprinter
- Sergey Kuryokhin (1954–1996), actor and musician
- Irina Malgina (born 1973), biathlete
- Elizaveta Nazarenkova (born 1995), Uzbek rhythmic gymnast
- Yevgeny Nikitin (born 1973), opera singer
- Zlata Ognevich (born 1986), Ukrainian singer
- Sergei Rozhkov (born 1972), biathlete
- Alexei Semenov (born 1981), ice hockey player
- Sergey Subbotin (born 1955), former mayor
- Konstantin Volkov (born 1997), ice hockey player
- Vitaly Zdorovetskiy (born 1992), YouTube personality, prankster
- Yana Kunitskaya (born 1989), UFC bantamweight fighter
- Roman Lyashenko (born 1979), ice hockey player

== See also ==
- List of northernmost settlements
