= Russian submarine Morzh =

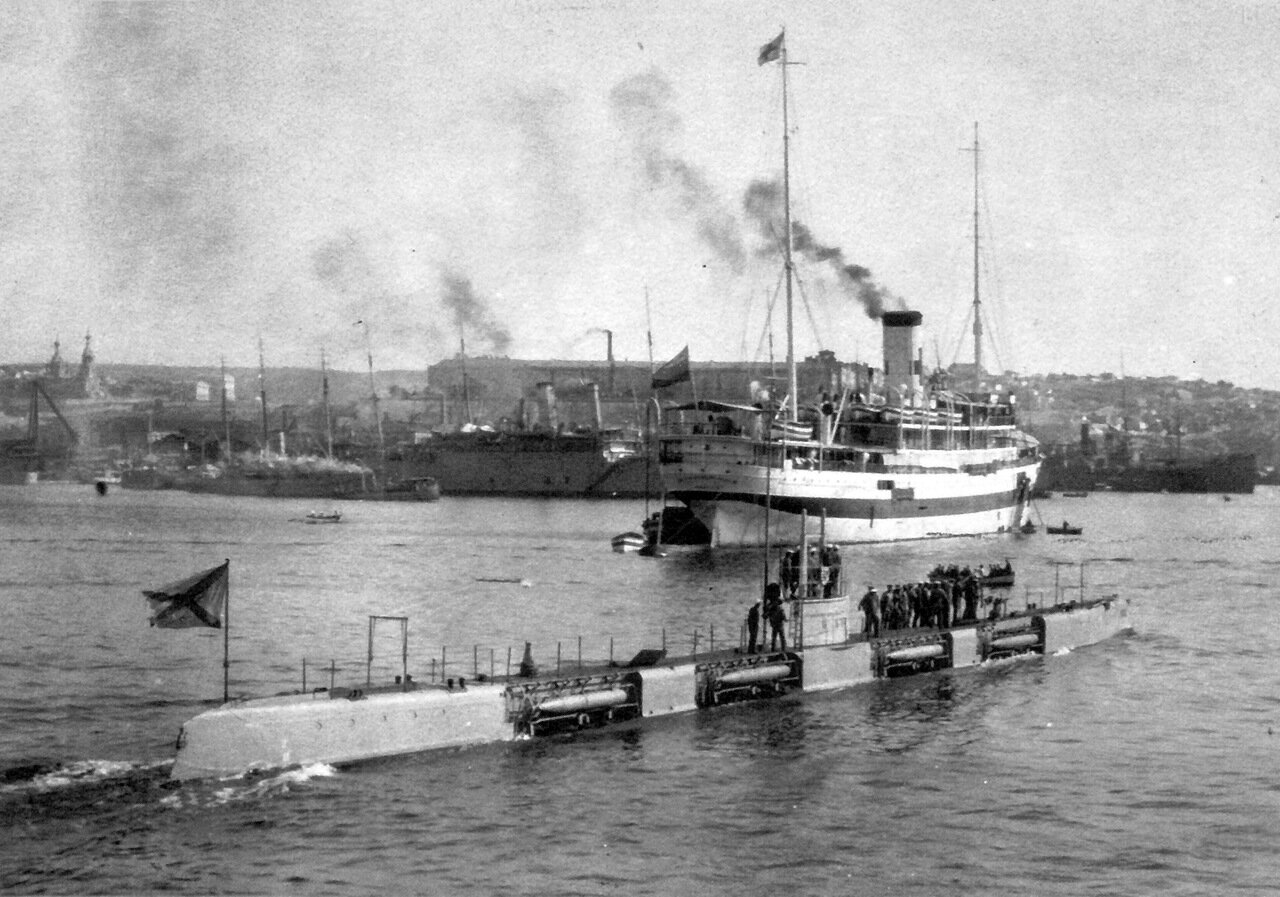
- Morzh in Sevastopol with hospital ship Imperator Pyotr Veliky in the background

History

Russian Empire
- Name: Morzh
- Namesake: Walrus
- Builder: Nikolayev branch of the Baltic Yard
- Laid down: 16 August 1913
- Launched: 15 September 1913
- Completed: 30 April 1915
- Fate: Sunk by a mine in May 1917 near the Bosporus

General characteristics
- Class & type: Morzh-class submarine
- Displacement: 630 long tons (640 t) surfaced; 760 long tons (770 t) submerged
- Length: 67 m (219 ft 10 in)
- Beam: 4.5 m (14 ft 9 in)
- Draft: 3.9 m (12 ft 10 in)
- Propulsion: Diesel-electric; 500 hp (370 kW) diesel engine; 800 hp (600 kW) electric motor; 2 shafts
- Speed: 10.8 knots (20.0 km/h) surfaced; 8 knots (15 km/h) submerged
- Range: 2,500 nmi (4,600 km)
- Complement: 47
- Armament: 1 × 57 mm (2 in) or 47 mm (2 in) gun; 4 × 457 mm (18 in) torpedo tubes; 8 × torpedoes in Dzhevetskiy drop collars (later removed)

The Russian submarine Morzh (Russian: Морж, lit. 'walrus') was the lead ship of the Morzh class of submarines of the Imperial Russian Navy. The submarine was laid down in August 1913 and was launched in September 1913, though it was not completed until April 1915.

Built for the Black Sea Fleet, it saw action during World War I, notably by intercepting Turkish coal shipments between Constantinople and Zonguldak, and on one occasion nearly hitting the German cruiser Goeben with torpedoes. Morzh was lost at sea near the Bosporus in May 1917, most likely destroyed by a naval mine, making it the only submarine of its class to have been lost in combat. It was credited with sinking or capturing 30 ships during its career, for a total tonnage of 4,907 gross register tons (GRT).

== Design and construction ==
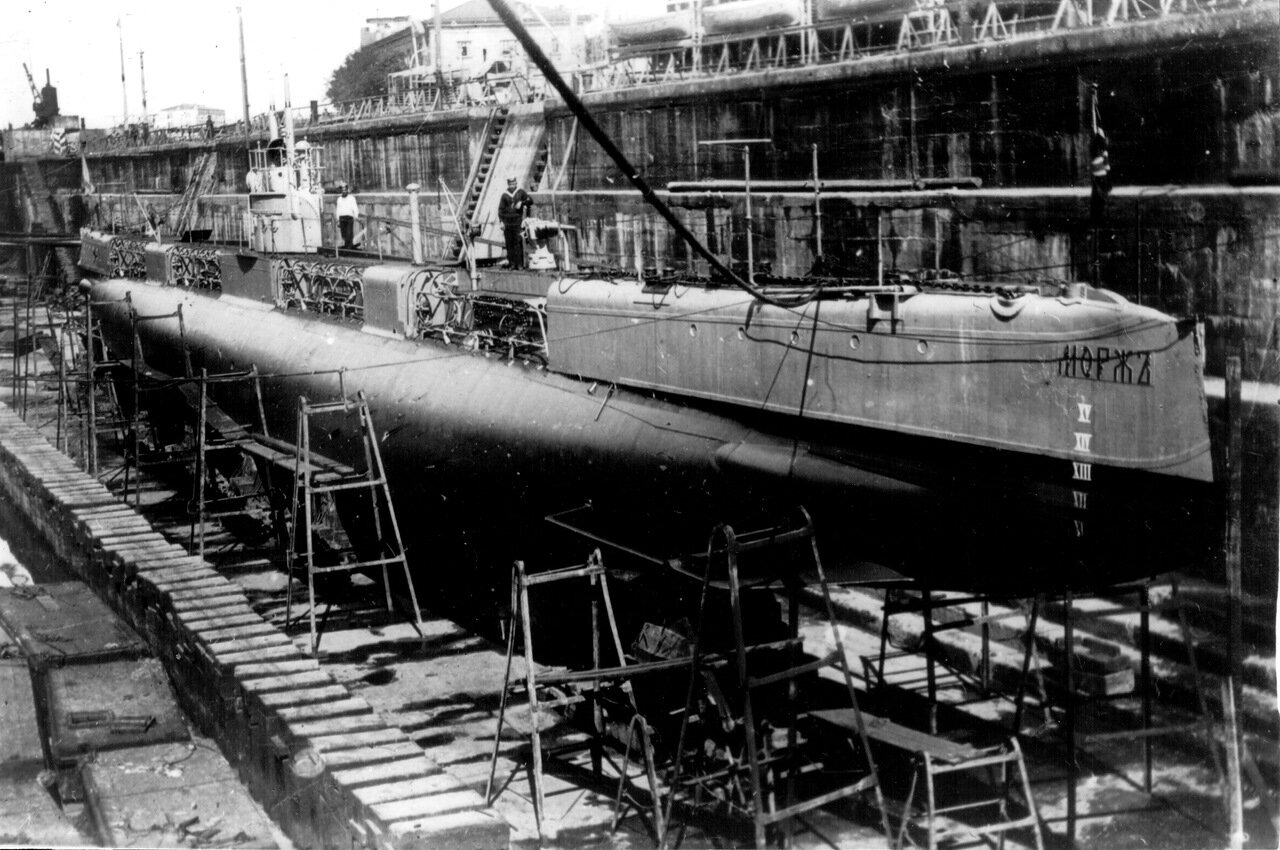
Morzh under construction

After being defeated in the Russo-Japanese War, the Russian Empire began rebuilding its Navy. Initially the main focus of the naval arms programs was on the Baltic and Pacific fleets, but as tensions increased with Austria-Hungary due to the Bosnian crisis in 1908 and with Ottoman Turkey after the expansion of its navy, the Black Sea Fleet was given more attention. The 1911 naval program approved by the State Duma included the order of six submarines for the Black Sea Fleet, which ended up being three Morzh-class boats and three Narval class. The naval engineer Ivan Bubnov was the designer of the Morzh class and developed it from his earlier submarine Akula, which was considered to be the most advanced of the Russian submarines at the time. In the years before the 1911 program, there was debate in the Imperial Russian Navy on whether to purchase and build the submarines designed by Ivan Bubnov, the chief submarine engineer of the Baltic Yard, or a foreign inspired design, based on the popular Holland type, which became known as the Narval class. Bubnov was supported by the Naval General Staff, while the foreign type was favored by members of the Naval Technological Committee. In the end, a conference led by Navy Minister Stepan Voevodskiy settled the matter by ordering three submarines of each class.

The Morzh-class submarines were well-armed for the time, having one deck gun, four internal torpedo tubes and eight Dzhevetskiy torpedo-launching collars. However, the vessel had numerous shortcomings. It suffered from having only a single hull, lacking bulkheads, having a slow diving time of 3 1/2 minutes due to poor ballast tank venting, and a diving depth of only 25 fathoms (150 ft; 46 m). An additional problem was that twin 1,140 horsepower (850 kW) diesel engines to power all three Morzh-class boats had been ordered from Germany, but were not delivered by the time World War I broke out. They had to be replaced by severely underpowered engines from the Amur River gunboats, each of which delivered only 250 horsepower (190 kW). This meant that the designed 16-knot (30 km/h; 18 mph) surface speed could not be attained. The designed 12-knot (22 km/h; 14 mph) underwater speed also could not be attained due to a poorly designed hull shape, which was more like that of a surface vessel than a submarine. The construction of all three submarines began on 25 June 1911 and took place at the Nikolayev department of the Baltic Yard, which was created specifically to build the Morzh class. Some of the components were made in Saint Petersburg before being sent to Nikolayev to be assembled.

The lead submarine of the class, Morzh, was launched in September 1913. Its engines were not installed until March 1915, and the sea trials were not complete until the end of April, at which point Morzh joined the Black Sea Fleet. This date made it the last boat in its class to be completed and enter service. At this point they were considered to be the best submarines in the Black Sea Fleet.

== World War I service ==
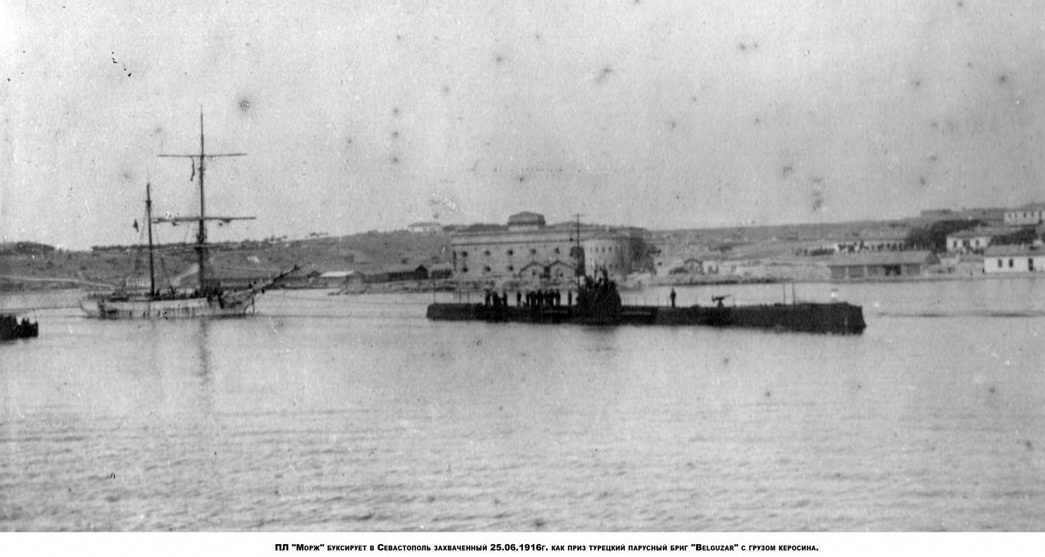
Morzh towing the captured Belouzar into Sevastopol

Around the time that the submarine was completed in early 1915, the Black Sea Fleet had been ordered to attack the Bosporus in preparation for landing ground troops there in support of the British and the French during the Gallipoli campaign. The other two boats of its class, Nerpa and Tyulen, were already active with the rest of the fleet in blockading the Bosporus to prevent coal shipments between Constantinople and the coal producing region near Zonguldak, about 150 miles away. The German commanding admiral in the region, Wilhelm Souchon, thought that Russian submarines could potentially cut off the Ottoman Navy from its main supply of coal, though initially they did not have that much success. Morzh joined its sister ships in patrolling the waters near the Bosporus. In July 1915, it accompanied the submarine minelayer Krab, which was also recently completed, to the opening of the strait to lay naval mines for the German cruiser Goeben. Krab had some engine problems during the mission and had to be towed back to base by Morzh.

In August 1915 Morzh carried out patrols together with Tyulen, and on the 10th they attacked a supply convoy escorted by Goeben, the Ottoman cruiser Hamidiye, and some Ottoman torpedo boats. Tyulen sank a large transport, and the next day both of them tried to attack Goeben, without success. Morzh continued targeting coal ships along the Anatolian coast over the next several months, and on 14 November 1915, it fired two torpedoes at Goeben that barely missed, while the cruiser was escorting some transports near the Bosporus. After this incident Souchon decided to stop using Goeben for the task of escorting merchant ships. The Russian naval attacks on the Bosporus in 1915 did not make a significant impact on the fighting in Gallipoli, but their campaign against coal shipping became a problem for the Ottomans.

In March 1916, the steamer Dubrovnik was torpedoed by Tyulen but still kept going, and it was finished off by Morzh. In May 1916, the submarine was damaged during an attack by a Turkish plane, and in June Morzh captured the Turkish sailing ship Belouzar, which was transporting oil. After the February Revolution in 1917, the Black Sea Fleet and its submarines continued to be active and the Russian Provisional Government intended to eventually land ground troops along the Anatolian coast. While on a patrol that took place in May 1917, Morzh was lost at sea with its entire crew of 42 men, most likely from a mine near the Bosporus.

Morzh carried out 19 patrols and was given credit for sinking or capturing 30 ships during the war, with a gross register tonnage of 4,907, which made it the third highest achieving Russian submarine in the Black Sea after Tyulen and Narval.

=== Gallery ===
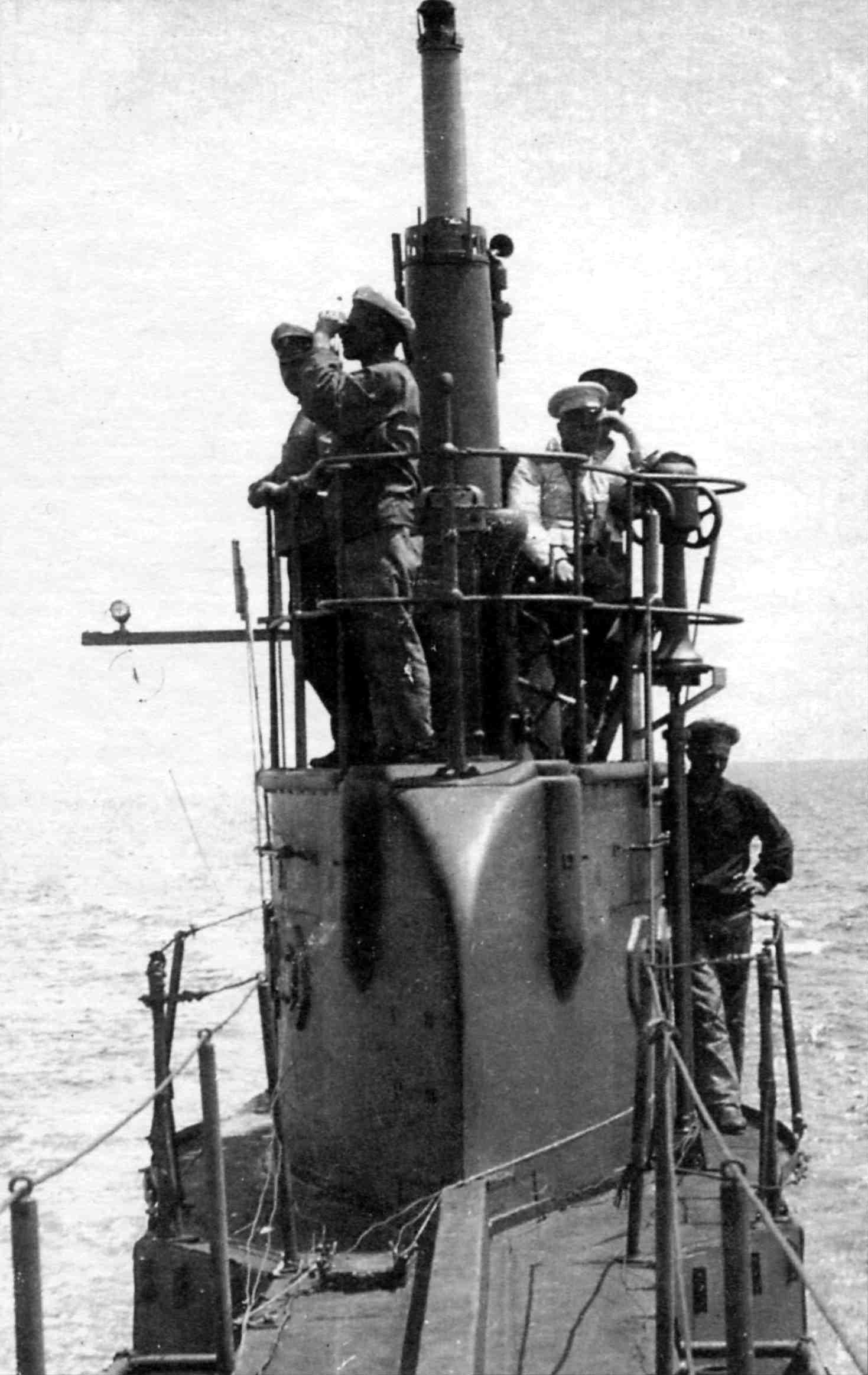
The submarine's conning tower.

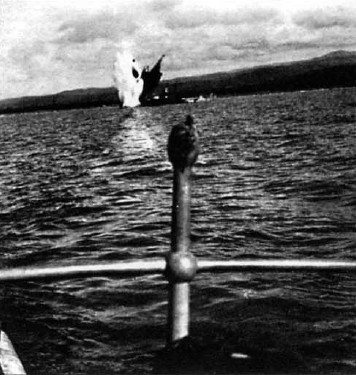
Transport ship Edirne being torpedoed.

== Memorial ==
The wreck of Morzh was discovered in 2000. There is a memorial for the crew of the submarine on the property of the Consulate General of Russia in Istanbul.
