= Russian submarine Narval =

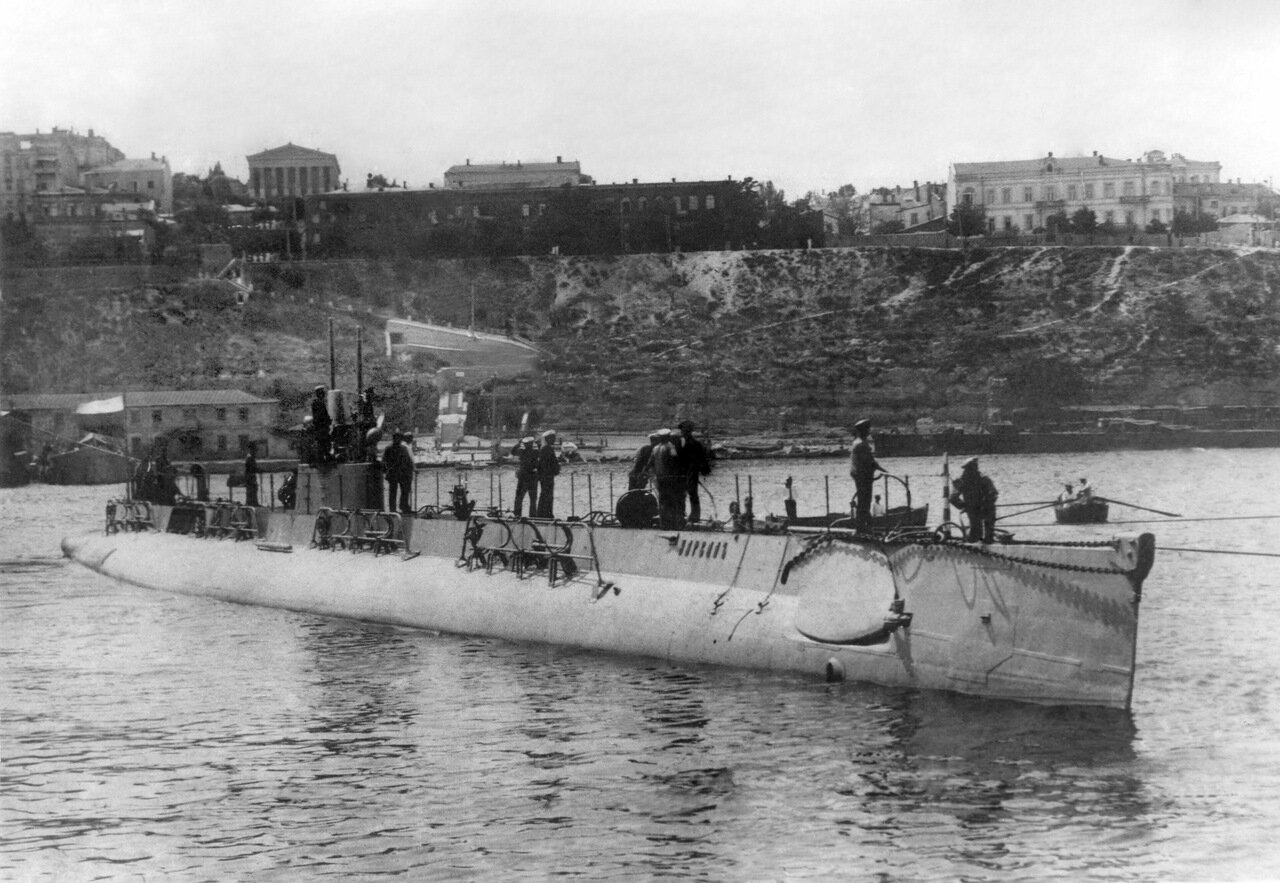
- Narval in Sevastopol c. 1915.

History

Russian Empire and the Republic
- Name: Narval
- Builder: Nevsky Factory, Saint Petersburg
- Laid down: December 1911
- Launched: 24 April (Note: O.S. 11 April) 1915
- Completed: 5 September (Note: O.S. 23 August) 1915
- Home port: Sevastopol
- Fate: Captured by Germany and then Britain. Scuttled on 26 April 1919.

General characteristics
- Type: Submarine
- Displacement: 673 long tons (684 t) surfaced; 1,045 long tons (1,062 t) submerged
- Length: 70.1 m (230.0 ft)
- Beam: 6.5 m (21.3 ft)
- Draught: 3.5 m (11.5 ft)
- Installed power: 640 hp (480 kW) (diesel); 900 hp (670 kW) (electric)
- Propulsion: Diesel-electric propulsion; 2 shafts; 4 diesel engines (2 per shaft)
- Speed: 9.5 kn (17.6 km/h) (surfaced); 11.5 kn (21.3 km/h) (submerged)
- Range: 3,500 nmi (6,500 km)
- Complement: 35
- Armament: 2 × 75 mm (3 in) gun; 4 × 450 mm (18 in) torpedo tubes; 8 × torpedoes in Dzhevetskiy drop collars; 2 × 7.62 mm machine guns (1917)

The Russian submarine Narval (Russian: Нарвал, lit. 'narwhal') was the lead ship of the Narval class of submarines of the Imperial Russian Navy. The boat was laid down in December 1911 and launched in April 1915, before undergoing sea trials and entering service in September [O.S. August] 1915. Just after being launched, Narval was inspected by Emperor Nicholas II. The submarine was built for the Black Sea Fleet, and its construction was accelerated after the outbreak of World War I. Narval took part in raiding Ottoman coal shipping along the Anatolian coast during the war, and was credited with destroying 31 ships for a total of 5,717 gross register tons (GRT), making it the second highest achieving Russian submarine in the Black Sea.

After the Russian Revolution, the submarine remained in Sevastopol, where it was first captured by the Germans and then by the British and the White Army in the Russian Civil War. The British scuttled Narval and several other submarines near Sevastopol in April 1919 to prevent the Bolsheviks from taking them.

== Design and construction ==
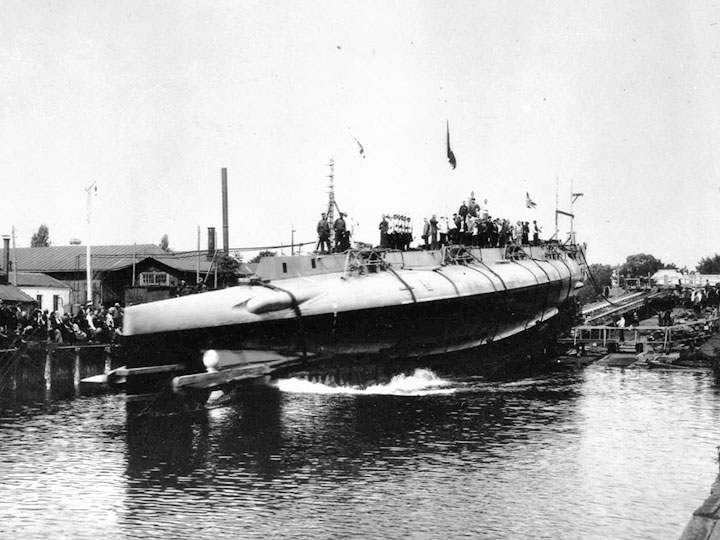
Narval being launched.

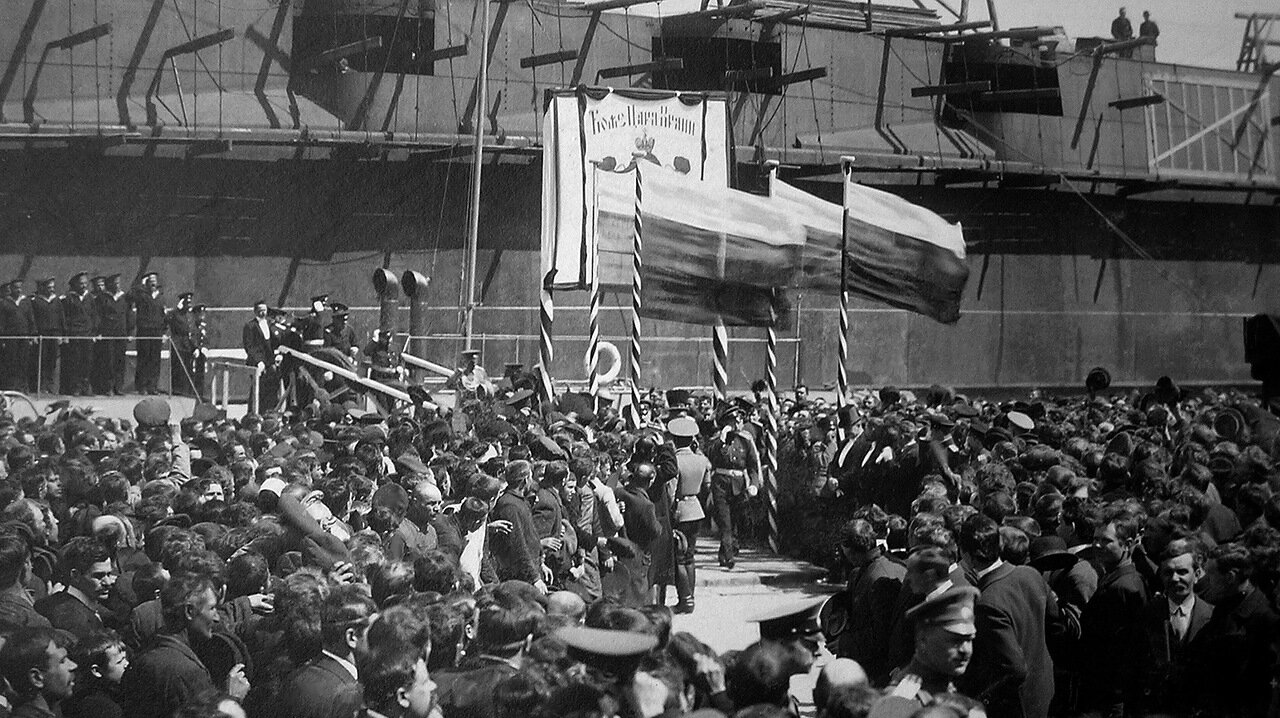
Emperor Nicholas II leaving Narval after his inspection.

After being defeated in the Russo-Japanese War, the Russian Empire began rebuilding its Navy. Initially the main focus of the naval arms programs was on the Baltic and Pacific fleets, but as tensions increased with Austria-Hungary due to the Bosnian crisis in 1908 and with Ottoman Turkey after the expansion of its navy, the Black Sea Fleet was given more attention. The 1911 naval program approved by the State Duma included the order of six submarines for the Black Sea Fleet, which ended up being three Narval-class boats and three Morzh class. The Nevsky Factory in Saint Petersburg developed the Narval class on the basis of a foreign design, the popular Holland type made by the American Holland Torpedo Boat Company. But there was a dispute in the Imperial Russian Navy before 1911 on which submarine type to purchase, the Narval class or the Morzh class that was designed by Ivan Bubnov, the chief submarine engineer of the Baltic Yard. Bubnov was supported by the Naval General Staff, while the foreign type was favored by members of the Naval Technological Committee, who argued that they needed to study foreign technological advancements. In the end, a conference led by Navy Minister Stepan Voevodskiy settled the matter by ordering three submarines of each class.

The Narval-class submarines were the most advanced Russian submarines at the time because unlike the rest they had crash-diving tanks for faster diving, internal bulkheads that provided more protection for the crew, and used natural flow to fill the main ballast tanks instead of pumps. A problem that arose during their construction was that the twin 1,140 horsepower (850 kW) diesel engines to power each boat had been ordered from Germany and were not delivered by the time World War I broke out, so they had to be replaced by four American-built engines that each provided 210 horsepower (160 kW). This meant that the designed 16-knot (30 km/h; 18 mph) surface speed could not be attained, and neither could the 12-knot (22 km/h; 14 mph) underwater speed. Narval had slightly different weaponry from the other boats in its class, being equipped with two Japanese 75 mm (3 in) deck guns and two 7.62 mm machine guns (the latter were installed in 1917). It also had four 450 mm (18 in) torpedo tubes and eight Dzhevetskiy torpedo-launching collars (reduced to four in 1917). It was heavier than the other two boats, having a displacement of 673 long tons (684 t) on the surface and 1,045 long tons (1,062 t) while underwater.

Construction of all three Narval-class submarines began in Saint Petersburg, where they were laid down in December 1911, before being transferred to the shipyards in Nikolayev for the final assembly. The engines were not delivered from the United States until January 1915. Narval was launched on 24 April [O.S. 11 April] 1915 and was inspected by Emperor Nicholas II several days later on 28 April. The submarine then carried out sea trials until August, which were accelerated to meet the demands of the war, and it was completed on 5 September [O.S. 23 August] 1915.

== Service history ==
=== World War I ===
At the time when Narval entered service with the Russian Black Sea Fleet, it was focused on disrupting the Ottoman merchant convoys transporting coal from the area of Zonguldak to Constantinople, which was the main source of fuel for the Ottoman Navy. The new Russian submarines that joined the fleet were tasked with patrolling the Anatolian coast and the entrance to the Bosporus. In December 1915 Narval experienced engine problems while on patrol near the Bosporus, and underwent repairs from January to April 1916 in Sevastopol. Its engines were modified with parts from those of unfinished AG-class submarines. Despite the engine issues, Narval and the other boats of its class became popular with Russian submarine crews. These three boats formed the 2nd Squadron of the Black Sea Submarine Brigade.

By late 1916, there were seven Russian submarines carrying out patrols in the Black Sea in total, which included Narval and the other boats of its class, the three boats of the Morzh class, and the submarine minelayer Krab. On 16 October 1916, Narval encountered a 4,000-ton Turkish transport that beached itself on the shore upon seeing the submarine, and destroyed it with torpedoes. The following day, it found the Turkish steamer Irmingard that also ran aground deliberately after hitting a mine, and also destroyed it. Narval destroyed a 3,000-ton steamer and multiple schooners in the Bosporus on 19 January 1917. The submarine crew tried to take one schooner that they captured to Sevastopol, but in bad weather the line connecting it to Narval was cut and it was lost at sea. After the February Revolution in 1917, the Black Sea Fleet and its submarines continued to be active as the Russian Provisional Government continued the war. Narval was still carrying out patrols near the Bosporus as of July 1917. In the autumn of 1917 all three of the Narval-class submarines underwent repairs and were put into the reserve.

During the war, Narval became the second highest achieving Russian submarine in the Black Sea after Tyulen, sinking 31 ships with a total tonnage of 5,717 GRT.

=== Russian Civil War ===
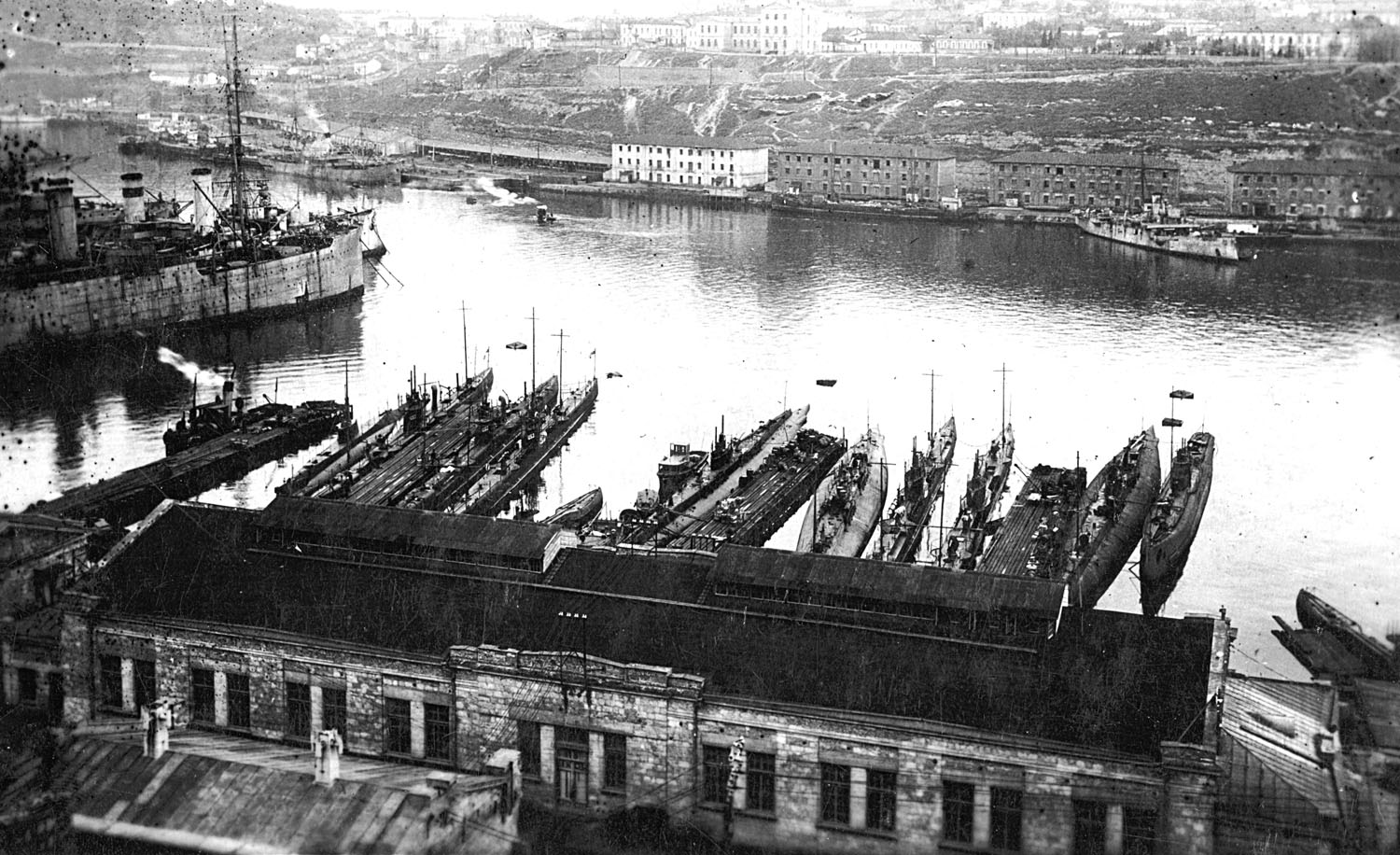
Russian submarines, including two Narval-class boats, in 1918.

After the October Revolution, on 9 February 1918 the Central Powers recognized Ukraine's independence and the German Army took control of Crimea by May 1918. The Central Powers wanted to divide up the ships of the Black Sea Fleet among themselves, and they were also claimed by the Ukrainian People's Republic. The crews of some ships raised the Ukrainian flag, including on the Narval. The submarine was then taken by the Germans, and after the end of the war in November 1918 the boat was acquired by the Western Allies and the White Russian forces. The British examined Narval on 26 December 1918 and decided that it was no longer seaworthy. They scuttled all three submarines of the Narval class near Sevastopol on 26 April 1919 to prevent them from being taken by the Bolsheviks.
