= Russian submarine Nerpa =

Two Russian submarines have been named Nerpa:

- Russian submarine Nerpa (1913), a Morzh-class submarine launched in 1913 and saw action in the Black Sea during World War I
- Russian submarine Nerpa (K-152), an Akula-class submarine launched in 2008, leased to the Indian Navy as Chakra from 2012 to 2021
