= Narval-class submarine =

Narval-class submarine may refer to:

- French Narval-class submarine, a six-boat French Navy submarine class built in the 1950s
- Russian Narval-class submarine, a three-boat Imperial Russian Navy submarine class built during World War I

== See also ==
- Narwhal-class submarine, a three-boat United States Navy class built in the 1930s; part of the U.S. Navy's V-boats
