= Russian submarine Nerpa (1913) =

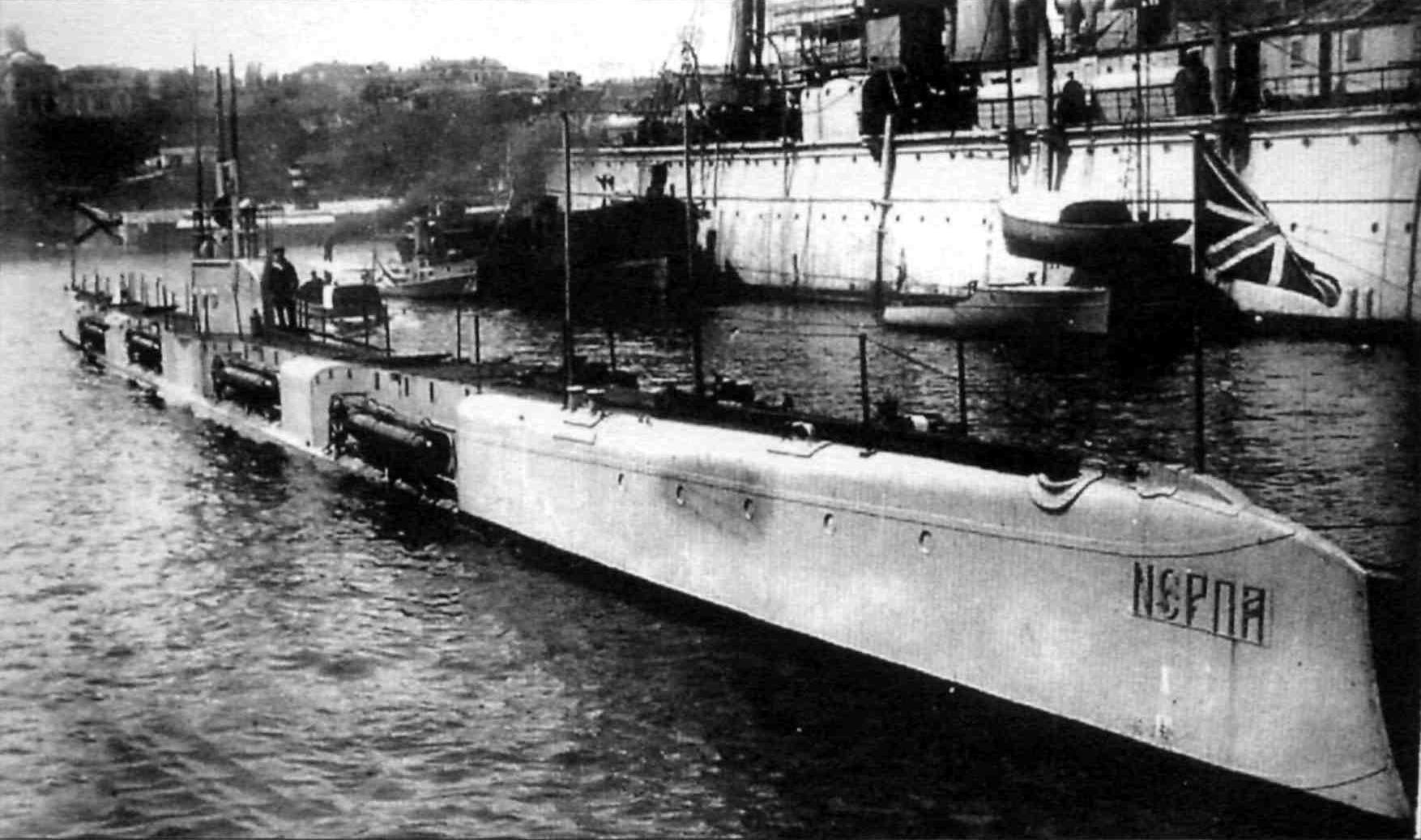
- Nerpa in 1915

History

Russian Empire and Republic
- Name: Nerpa
- Namesake: Baikal seal
- Builder: Nikolayev branch of the Baltic Yard
- Laid down: 15 August 1913
- Launched: 15 August 1913
- Completed: 30 December 1914
- Fate: Captured by the Bolsheviks in 1920 while under repair

Russian SFSR and the Soviet Union
- Name: Politruk (renamed in January 1923)
- Commissioned: 3 June 1922
- Fate: Stricken on 3 November 1929, scrapped in 1931.

General characteristics
- Class & type: Morzh-class submarine
- Displacement: 630 long tons (640 t) surfaced; 760 long tons (770 t) submerged
- Length: 67 m (219 ft 10 in)
- Beam: 4.5 m (14 ft 9 in)
- Draft: 3.9 m (12 ft 10 in)
- Propulsion: Diesel-electric; 500 hp (370 kW) diesel engine; 800 hp (600 kW) electric motor; 2 shafts
- Speed: 10.8 knots (20.0 km/h) surfaced; 8 knots (15 km/h) submerged
- Range: 2,500 nmi (4,600 km)
- Complement: 47
- Armament: 1 × 57 mm (2 in) or 47 mm (2 in) gun; 4 × 457 mm (18 in) torpedo tubes; 8 × torpedoes in Dzhevetskiy drop collars (later removed)

The Russian submarine Nerpa (Russian: Нерпа, lit. 'Baikal seal') was the second boat of the Morzh class of submarines of the Imperial Russian Navy. It was laid down and launched on the same day in August 1913, and completed its sea trials in December 1914. Built for the Black Sea Fleet, the submarine saw action during World War I, and spent much of the war raiding Ottoman merchant shipping that transported coal from Zonguldak to Constantinople. Nerpa was credited with sinking 24 ships during the conflict for a total of 2,443 gross register tons (GRT), making it the fourth most successful Russian submarine in the Black Sea.

Nerpa was undergoing major repairs at the shipyard in Nikolayev when the October Revolution occurred. During the Russian Civil War the city was occupied over time by several forces, including Germany, the Western Allies, and the White Army, before being taken by the Bolsheviks and becoming part of the Soviet Union. Nerpa was the only prewar Russian submarine in the Black Sea captured by the Bolsheviks, and it was commissioned into the Soviet Navy in June 1922, before being renamed Politruk (Russian: Политрук, lit. 'political leader') in January 1923. The boat became part of the Detached Submarine Division of the Soviet Black Sea Fleet, along with four AG-class submarines. Politruk remained on active service until November 1929, when it was removed from the fleet, and it was scrapped in 1931.

== Design and construction ==
After being defeated in the Russo-Japanese War, the Russian Empire began rebuilding its Navy. Initially the main focus of the naval arms programs was on the Baltic and Pacific fleets, but as tensions increased with Austria-Hungary due to the Bosnian crisis in 1908 and with Ottoman Turkey after the expansion of its navy, the Black Sea Fleet was given more attention. The 1911 naval program approved by the State Duma included the order of six submarines for the Black Sea Fleet, which ended up being three Morzh-class boats and three Narval class. The naval engineer Ivan Bubnov was the designer of the Morzh class and developed it from his earlier submarine Akula, which was considered to be the most advanced of the Russian submarines at the time. In the years before the 1911 program, there was debate in the Imperial Russian Navy on whether to purchase and build the submarines designed by Ivan Bubnov, the chief submarine engineer of the Baltic Yard, or a foreign inspired design, based on the popular Holland type, which became known as the Narval class. Bubnov was supported by the Naval General Staff, while the foreign type was favored by members of the Naval Technological Committee. In the end, a conference led by Navy Minister Stepan Voevodskiy settled the matter by ordering three submarines of each class.

The Morzh-class submarines were well-armed for the time, having one deck gun, four internal torpedo tubes and eight Dzhevetskiy torpedo-launching collars. However, the vessel had numerous shortcomings. It suffered from having only a single hull, lacking bulkheads, having a slow diving time of 3 1/2 minutes due to poor ballast tank venting, and a diving depth of only 25 fathoms (150 ft; 46 m). An additional problem was that twin 1,140 horsepower (850 kW) diesel engines to power all three Morzh-class boats had been ordered from Germany, but were not delivered by the time World War I broke out. They had to be replaced by severely underpowered engines from the Amur River gunboats, each of which delivered only 250 horsepower (190 kW). This meant that the designed 16-knot (30 km/h; 18 mph) surface speed could not be attained. The designed 12-knot (22 km/h; 14 mph) underwater speed also could not be attained due to a poorly-designed hull shape, which was more like that of a surface vessel than a submarine. The construction of all three submarines began on 25 June 1911 and took place at the Nikolayev department of the Baltic Yard, which was created specifically to build the Morzh class. Some of the components were made in Saint Petersburg before being sent to Nikolayev to be assembled.

Nerpa was laid down and launched in August 1913, and received its engines in November 1914, with the sea trials taking place until the end of the following month. This made Nerpa the first of the Morzh-class boats to enter service, and at the time were they considered to be the best submarines in the Black Sea Fleet.

== World War I service ==
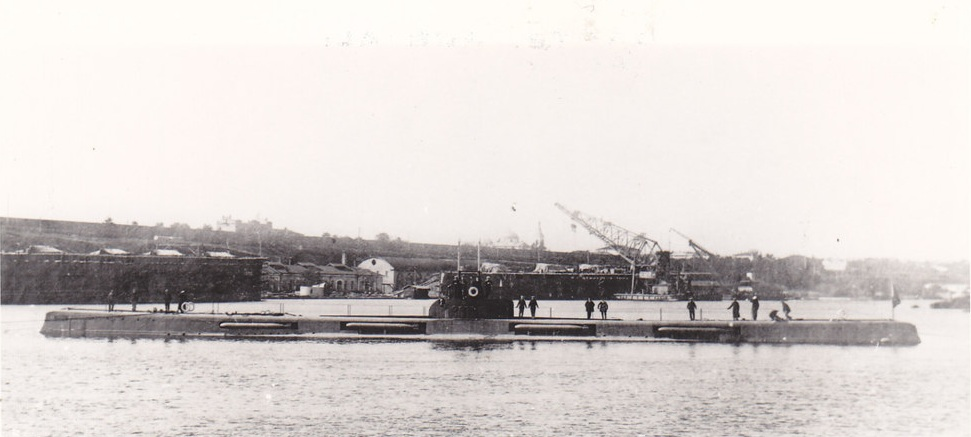
Nerpa during the war

At the same time when Nerpa was undergoing sea trials and began active service, the Russian Black Sea Fleet was following a defensive strategy, but this changed in early 1915 when the Stavka ordered it to attack the Bosporus to support the Gallipoli campaign of the British and the French. Nerpa carried out its first patrol near the Bosporus from 5 to 8 March 1915, becoming the first Russian submarine to do so. The patrol was uneventful. But by April, the Russian focus changed to stopping coal shipments along the Turkish coast from the area of Zonguldak to Constantinople, and the submarines, working with destroyers, implemented a partial blockade of the Bosporus. It eventually had the effect of forcing the German ships in the Black Sea to limit their operations to save fuel. Initially it was Nerpa and its sister ship Tyulen working on this task, and they were later joined by the final boat of their class, Morzh. At first the two submarines took turns going on patrol, but they later began patrolling at the same time, with each taking a position on either side of the entrance to the strait.

On 5 September 1915 the submarine Nerpa, commanded by V. V. Vilken, worked together with the destroyers Bystry and Pronzitelny to attack an Ottoman merchant ship convoy on its way to Constantinople from Zonguldak. It was escorted by the cruiser Hamidiye and the destroyers Nümune-i Hamiyet and Muavenet-i Milliye. After spotting the submarine and the destroyers, the escorts abandoned the convoy and sped toward the Bosporus, while also sending a message to the battlecruiser Goeben for assistance. The coal transport ships beached themselves on the shore and were attacked by the destroyers. Goeben arrived some time later and opened fire at Nerpa after spotting the submarine on the surface. Nerpa crash dived and was able to escape.

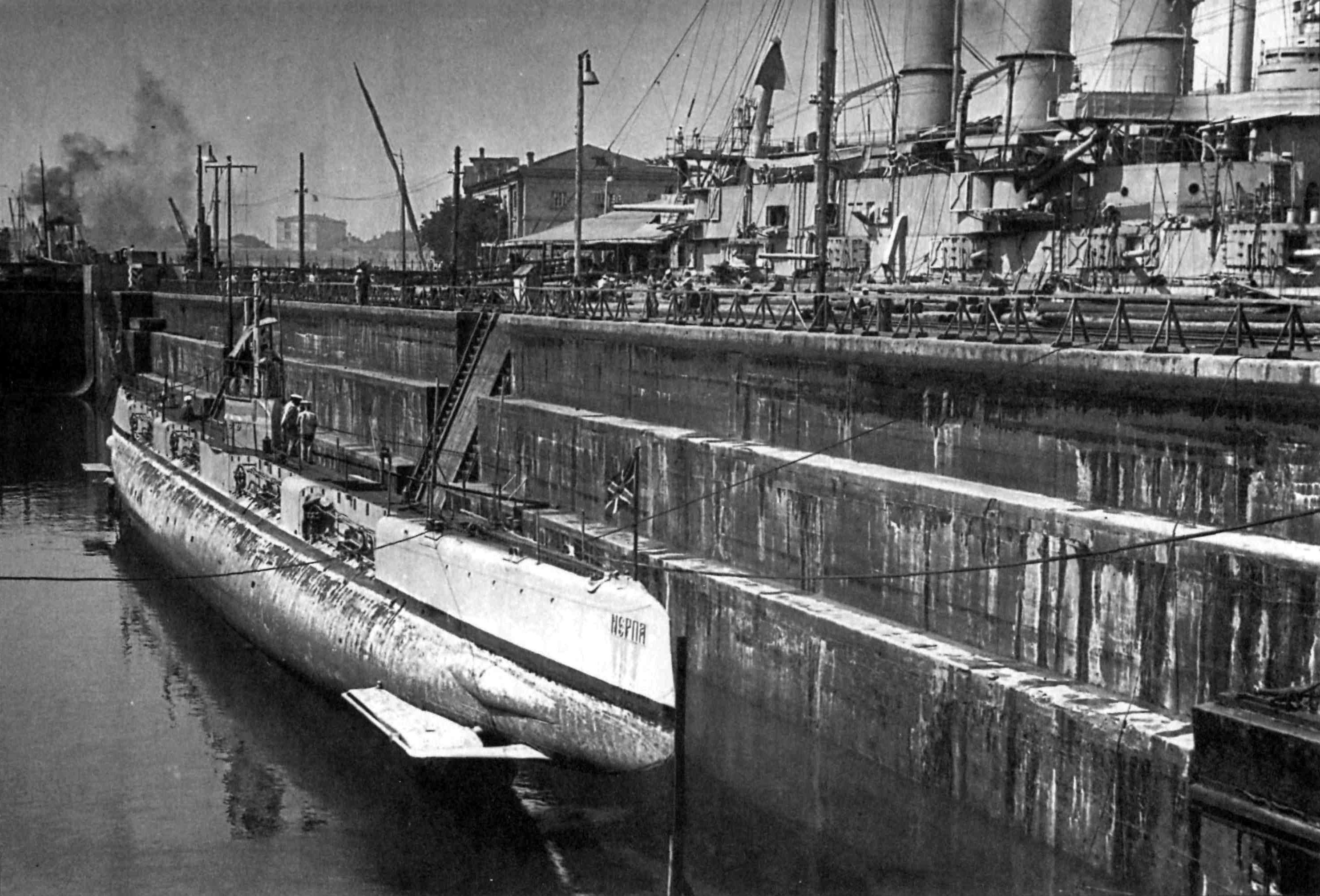
Nerpa in a dry dock in 1915.

Nerpa was attacked by the German submarine UB-7 on 21 August 1916 while traveling on the surface near the Bosporus. Of the two torpedoes fired by UB-7 one missed completely, while the second glanced off the stern but did not detonate because its detonation mechanism did not work properly. By late 1916, there were seven Russian submarines carrying out patrols in the Black Sea in total, which included Nerpa and the other two Morzh-class boats, the three boats of the Narval class, and the submarine minelayer Krab.

After the February Revolution in 1917, the Russian Provisional Government continued operations in the Black Sea, including the attacks on Ottoman coal shipping. On 24 April 1917 Nerpa was close to the entrance of the Bosporus when two transport ships left on their way to Zonguldak. They stayed close to the coast where they were protected by coastal artillery, but the submarine fired at it with its own deck guns, and then destroyed both of the transports. Nerpa was on patrol in that area again as of 26 June 1917, when the cruiser Breslau was returning to port after laying mines near the entrance of the Danube and was being pursued by several Russian warships. But the submarine was not close enough to make an attack and Breslau made it back.

Sometime after June 1917, the submarine underwent major repairs at the shipyard in Nikolayev, and that is where it was when the October Revolution occurred. During the war Nerpa was credited with destroying 24 ships for a total tonnage of 2,443 GRT, making it the fourth most successful submarine of the Black Sea Fleet and one of the more successful ones in the Imperial Russian Navy overall.

== In the Soviet Navy ==
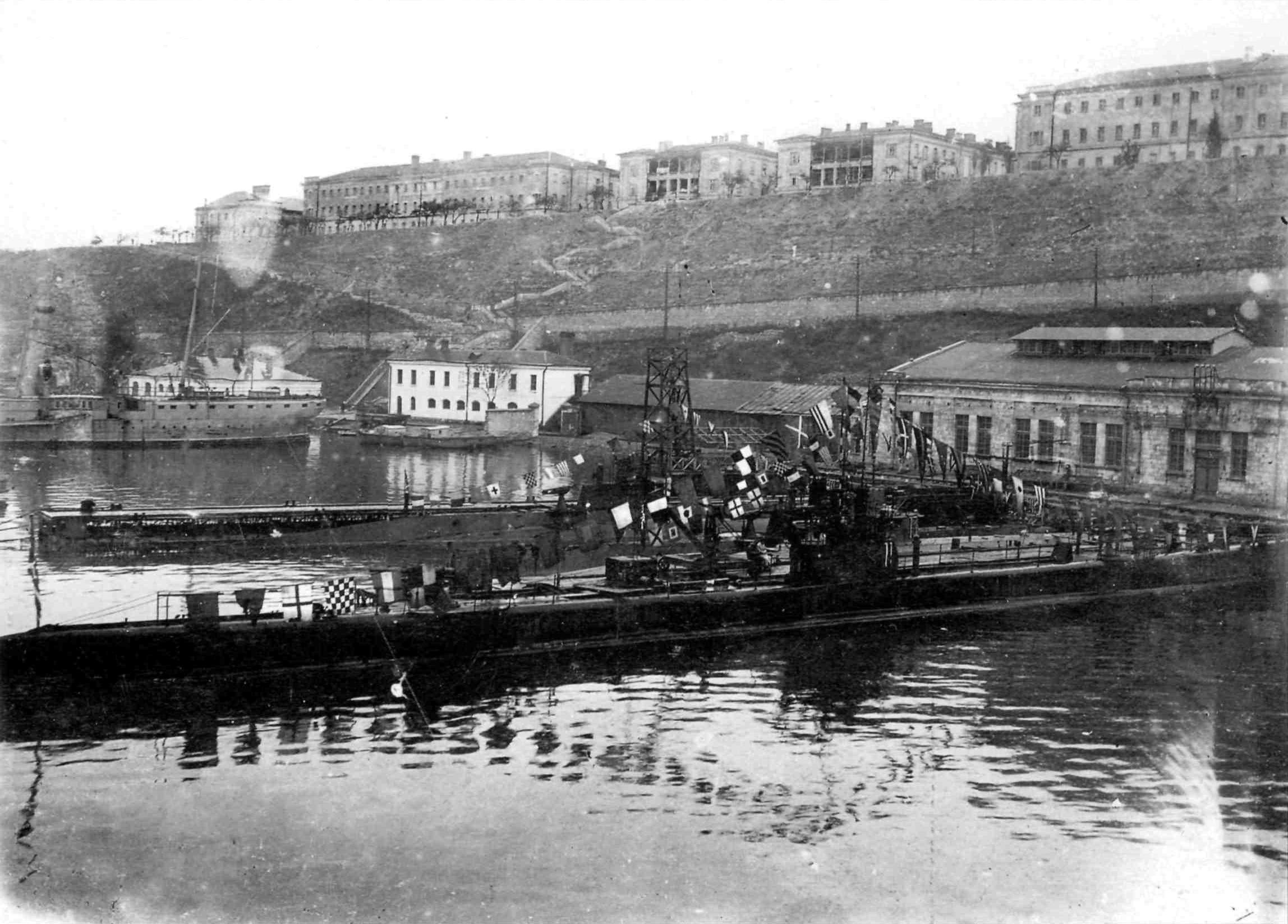
Nerpa as Politruk some time in the 1920s.

In the years after the October Revolution, the port of Nikolayev was controlled by several different factions. The German Army advanced into the territory of the Ukrainian People's Republic, which it recognized on 9 February 1918, and occupied Nikolayev by 17 March 1918. After the surrender of Germany, the Western Allies were present in the area, along with elements of the Russian White Army, but they withdrew and the Bolsheviks took over the area by the end of 1920. Nerpa was the only prewar submarine in the Black Sea that was in Bolshevik control by the end of the Russian Civil War.

It was commissioned into the Soviet Navy on 3 June 1922 and was renamed Politruk in January 1923. The Bolsheviks established the Naval Forces of the Black and Azov Seas (renamed the Naval Forces of the Black Sea in 1922), which included a Detached Submarine Division that was formed on 21 October 1920 in Nikolayev before being moved to Sevastopol. This division included Politruk along with four American Holland-type submarines that arrived in Russia in separate pieces and still had not been assembled by the time of the Revolution (AG-23, AG-24, AG-25, and AG-26).

Politruk was initially manned by crewmen that arrived from the Caspian Sea, where they had worked on several older submarines that made up a reserve force until they were scrapped circa 1922. The boat stayed in active service for several years and underwent another repair between 1925 and 1926. On 3 November 1929 Politruk was removed from the fleet, and it was scrapped in 1931.

=== Gallery ===
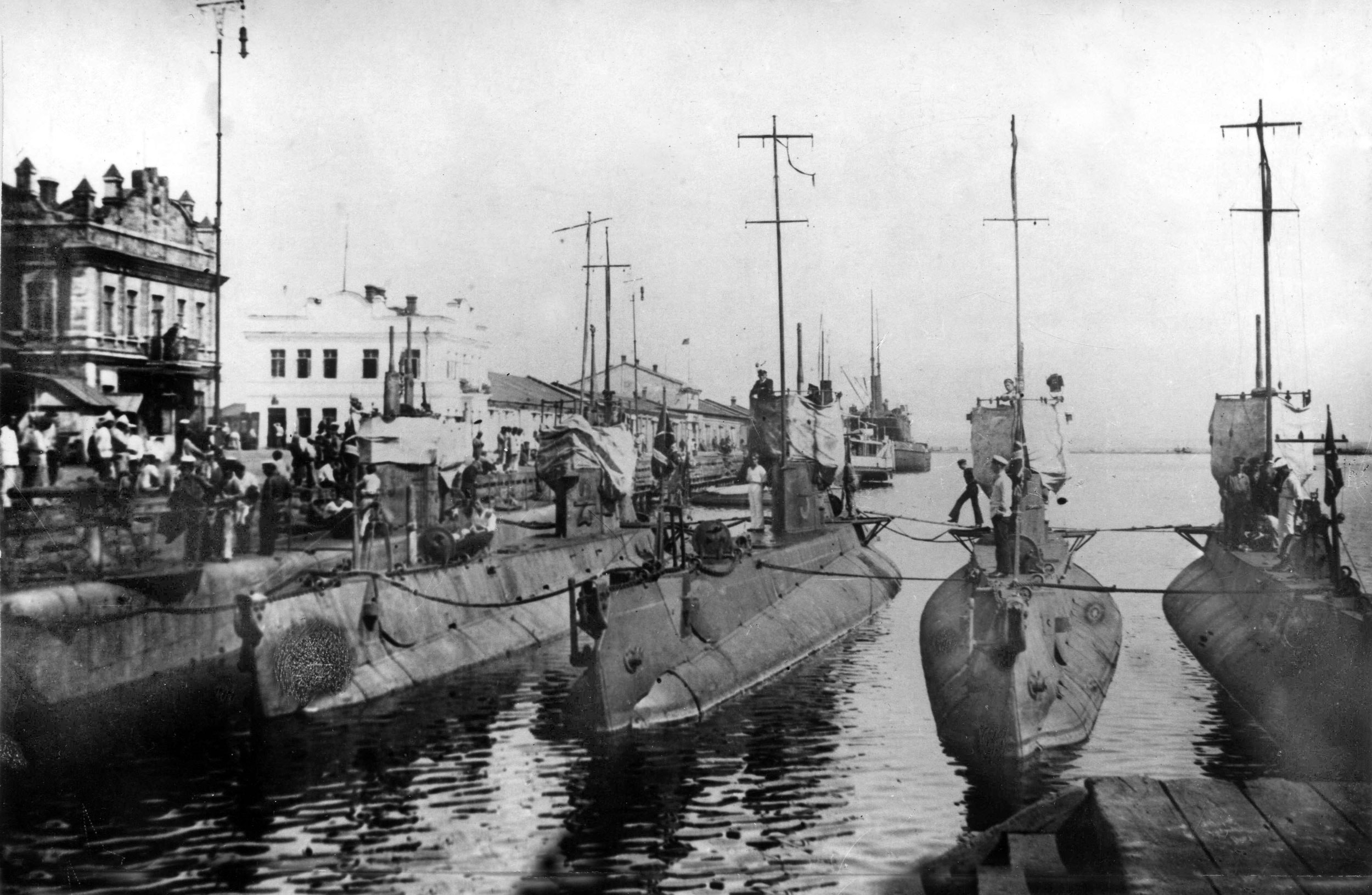
Politruk (first on the left) with the AG-series boats

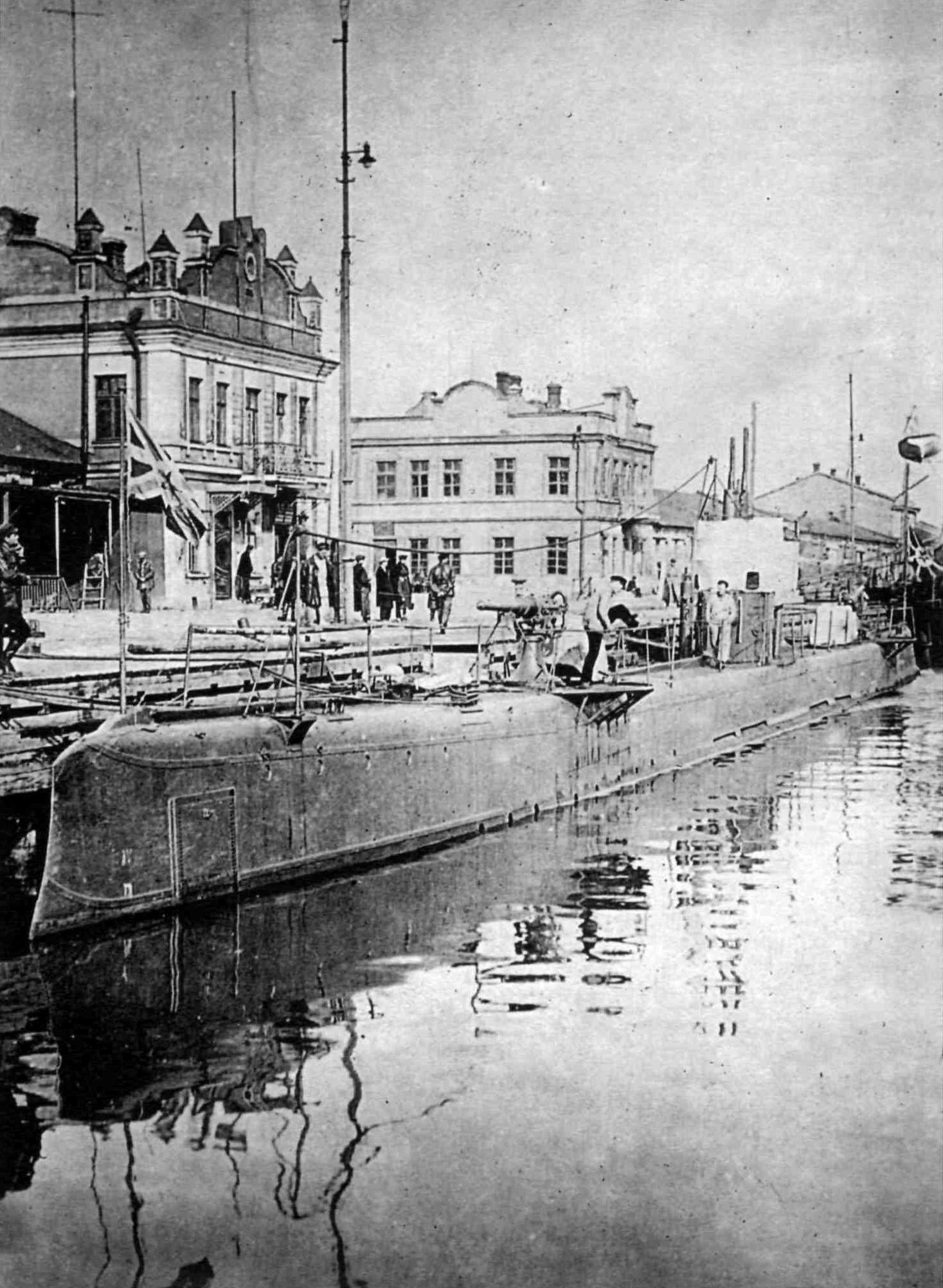
Politruk at the docks

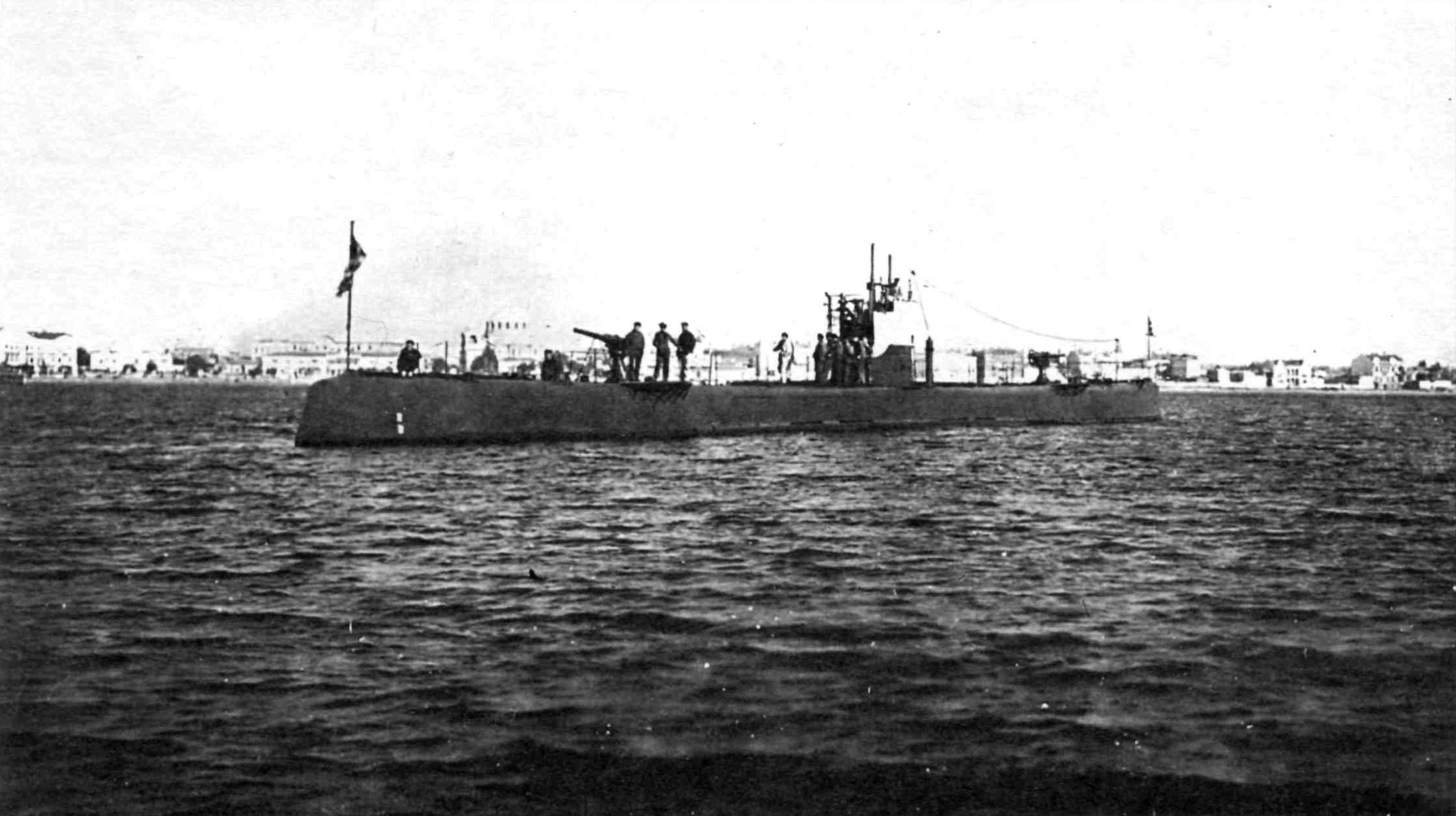
The boat at sea
