= Russian submarine Kit =

Russian submarine

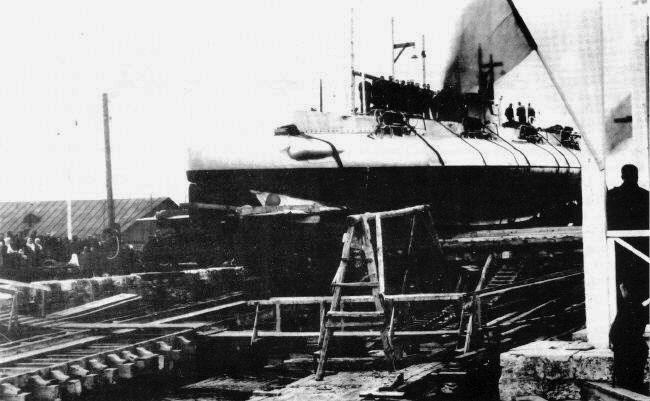
- Kit before being launched in Nikolayev in 1915.

History

Russian Empire and Republic
- Name: Kit
- Builder: Nevsky Factory, Saint Petersburg
- Laid down: December 1911
- Launched: May 1915
- Completed: 27 October (Note: O.S. 14 October) 1915
- Home port: Sevastopol
- Fate: Captured by Germany and then Britain. Scuttled on 26 April 1919, raised in 1934 and scrapped.

General characteristics
- Type: Submarine
- Displacement: 621 long tons (631 t) surfaced; 994 long tons (1,010 t) submerged
- Length: 70.1 m (230.0 ft)
- Beam: 6.5 m (21.3 ft)
- Draught: 3.5 m (11.5 ft)
- Installed power: 640 hp (480 kW) (diesel); 900 hp (670 kW) (electric)
- Propulsion: Diesel-electric propulsion; 2 shafts; 4 diesel engines (2 per shaft)
- Speed: 9.5 kn (17.6 km/h) (surfaced); 11.5 kn (21.3 km/h) (submerged)
- Range: 3,500 nmi (6,500 km)
- Complement: 35
- Armament: 1 × 75 mm (3 in) gun and 1 × 57 mm (2 in); 4 × 450 mm (18 in) torpedo tubes; 8 × torpedoes in Dzhevetskiy drop collars; 2 × 7.62 mm machine guns (1917)

Kit (Russian: Кит, lit. 'whale') was the second boat of the Narval class of submarines of the Imperial Russian Navy. The submarine was laid down in December 1911 and launched in May 1915, though it was not completed until October 1915. Built for the Black Sea Fleet, it carried out raids against Ottoman supply convoys along the coast of Anatolia and was responsible for sinking 24 ships, for a total of 1,270 gross register tons (GRT).

After the Russian Revolution, the submarine remained in Sevastopol, where it was first captured by the Germans and then by the British and the White Army in the Russian Civil War. The British scuttled Kit and several other submarines near Sevastopol in April 1919 to prevent the Bolsheviks from acquiring them. Their location was found by the Soviets in 1934 and Kit became the only one of them to be raised, though they decided not to restore the submarine and had it scrapped.

== Design and construction ==
After being defeated in the Russo-Japanese War, the Russian Empire began rebuilding its Navy. Initially the main focus of the naval arms programs was on the Baltic and Pacific fleets, but as tensions increased with Austria-Hungary due to the Bosnian crisis in 1908 and with Ottoman Turkey after the expansion of its navy, the Black Sea Fleet was given more attention. The 1911 naval program approved by the State Duma included the order of six submarines for the Black Sea Fleet, which ended up being three Narval-class boats and three Morzh class. The Nevsky Factory in Saint Petersburg developed the Narval class on the basis of a foreign design, the popular Holland type made by the American Holland Torpedo Boat Company. But there was a dispute in the Imperial Russian Navy before 1911 on which submarine type to purchase, the Narval class or the Morzh class that was designed by Ivan Bubnov, the chief submarine engineer of the Baltic Yard. Bubnov was supported by the Naval General Staff, while the foreign type was favored by members of the Naval Technological Committee, who argued that they needed to study foreign technological advancements. In the end, a conference led by Navy Minister Stepan Voevodskiy settled the matter by ordering three submarines of each class.

The Narval-class submarines were the most advanced Russian submarines at the time because unlike the rest they had crash-diving tanks for faster diving, internal bulkheads that provided more protection for the crew, and used natural flow to fill the main ballast tanks instead of pumps. A problem that arose during their construction was that the twin 1,140 horsepower (850 kW) diesel engines to power each boat had been ordered from Germany and were not delivered by the time World War I broke out, so they had to be replaced by four American-built engines that each provided 210 horsepower (160 kW). This meant that the designed 16-knot (30 km/h; 18 mph) surface speed could not be attained, and neither could the 12-knot (22 km/h; 14 mph) underwater speed. Kit had slightly different weaponry from the other boats in its class, being equipped with two deck guns, including one 75 mm (3 in) and one 57 mm (2 in), along with four 450 mm (18 in) torpedo tubes and eight Dzhevetskiy torpedo-launching collars. After modifications done in 1917, Kit also received two 7.62 mm machine guns and its artillery was changed for two Japanese 75 mm guns, though its external torpedo-launching collars were reduced to four.

Construction of all three Narval-class submarines began in Saint Petersburg, where they were laid down in December 1911, before being transferred to the shipyards in Nikolayev for the final assembly. The engines were not delivered from the United States until January 1915. Kit began its sea trials in the fall of 1915, during which some engine problems were discovered, and it underwent modifications. The submarine was completed and entered service on 27 October [O.S. 14 October] 1915.

== Service history ==
=== World War I ===
At the time when Kit entered service with the Russian Black Sea Fleet, it was focused on disrupting the Ottoman merchant convoys transporting coal from the area of Zonguldak to Constantinople, which was the main source of fuel for the Ottoman Navy. The new submarines that joined the fleet were tasked with patrolling the Anatolian coast and the entrance to the Bosporus. Despite issues with their engines, Kit and the other boats of its class became popular with Russian submarine crews. The three boats became the 2nd Squadron of the Black Sea Submarine Brigade.

From late 1915 until April 1916, Kit was given modifications, this time receiving more advanced communications equipment, and it returned to service by May 1916. In that month, while on patrol, Kit was attacked by a German aircraft on the 12th, though it was able to escape without any damage. The submarine carried out six patrols in the early summer of 1916. During one of these, on 13 June 1916 Kit sank a Turkish schooner that was transporting oil. On 23 October it accompanied several other ships on a mission to lay mines near the Bosporus, and in mid-November the submarine participated in a reconnaissance mission along the Bulgarian coast near Varna. The mission also included the cruiser Pamiat Merkuria, the destroyer Gromki, and several minelayers and minesweepers. Kit assisted the other ships with navigation, but they did not find any minefields there to clear out. On 13 December 1916 the submarine rammed and destroyed a Turkish steamer near the Bosporus, and in January 1917 it sank another seven ships in the same area.

After the February Revolution in 1917, the Black Sea Fleet and its submarines continued to be active as the Russian Provisional Government continued the war, though in the autumn of 1917 all three of the Narval-class boats underwent repairs and were put into the reserve. By the October Revolution, Kit was credited with sinking 24 ships with a total tonnage of 1,270 GRT.

=== Russian Civil War ===
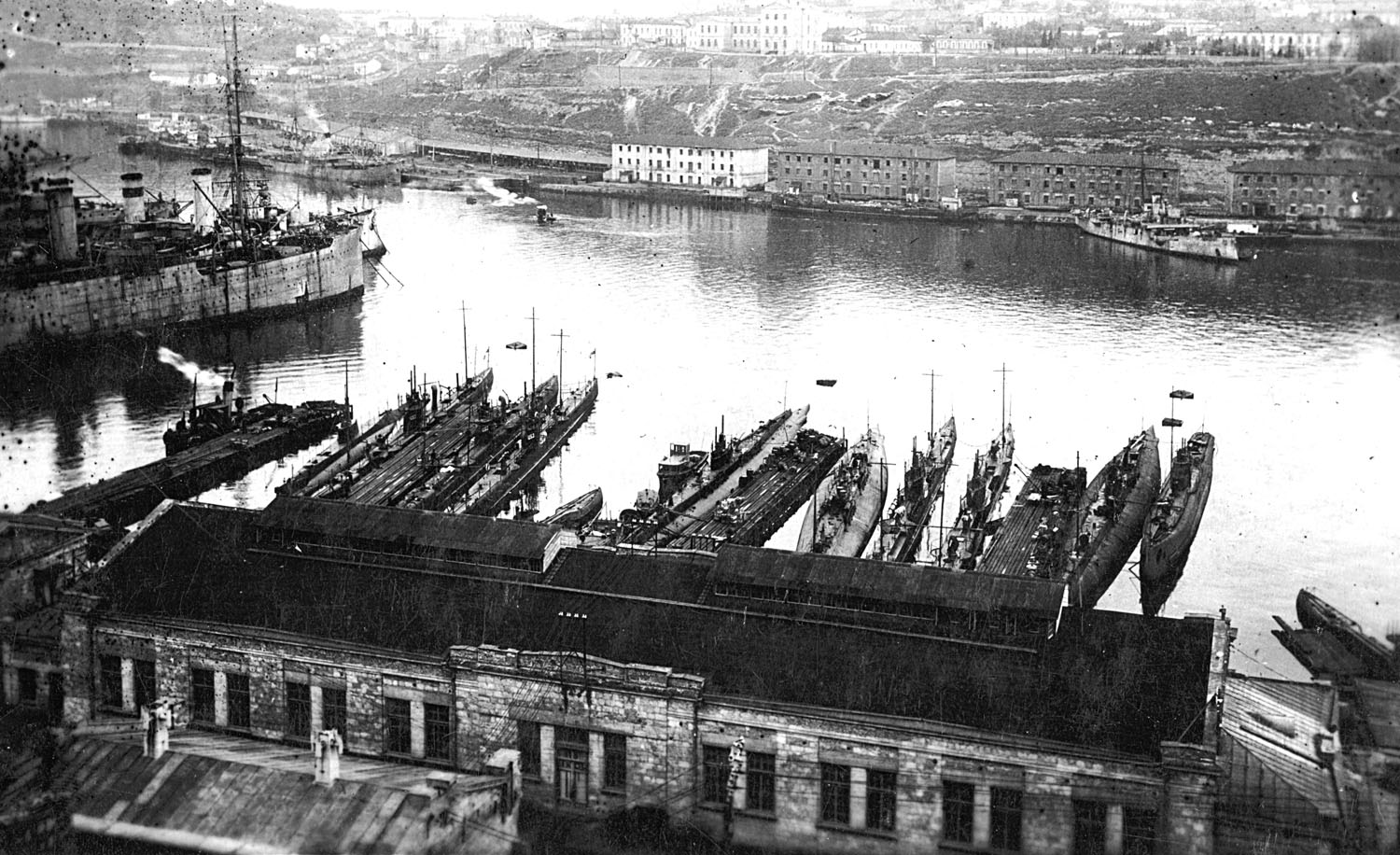
Russian submarines, including two Narval-class boats, in 1918.

After the October Revolution, on 9 February 1918 the Central Powers recognized Ukraine's independence and the German Army took control of Crimea by May 1918. The Central Powers wanted to divide up the ships of the Black Sea Fleet among themselves, and they were also claimed by the Ukrainian People's Republic. The crews of some ships raised the Ukrainian flag, including on the Kit. The submarine was then taken by the Germans, and after the end of the war in November 1918 the boat was acquired by the Western Allies and the White Russian forces. The British scuttled all three submarines of the Narval class near Sevastopol on 26 April 1919 to prevent them from being taken by the Bolsheviks.

Between 1934 and 1935, the wreckage of the submarines was discovered and Kit was the only one of them to be raised by the Soviets. They decided not to restore it and the boat was sent to be scrapped.
