= Russian submarine Tyulen =

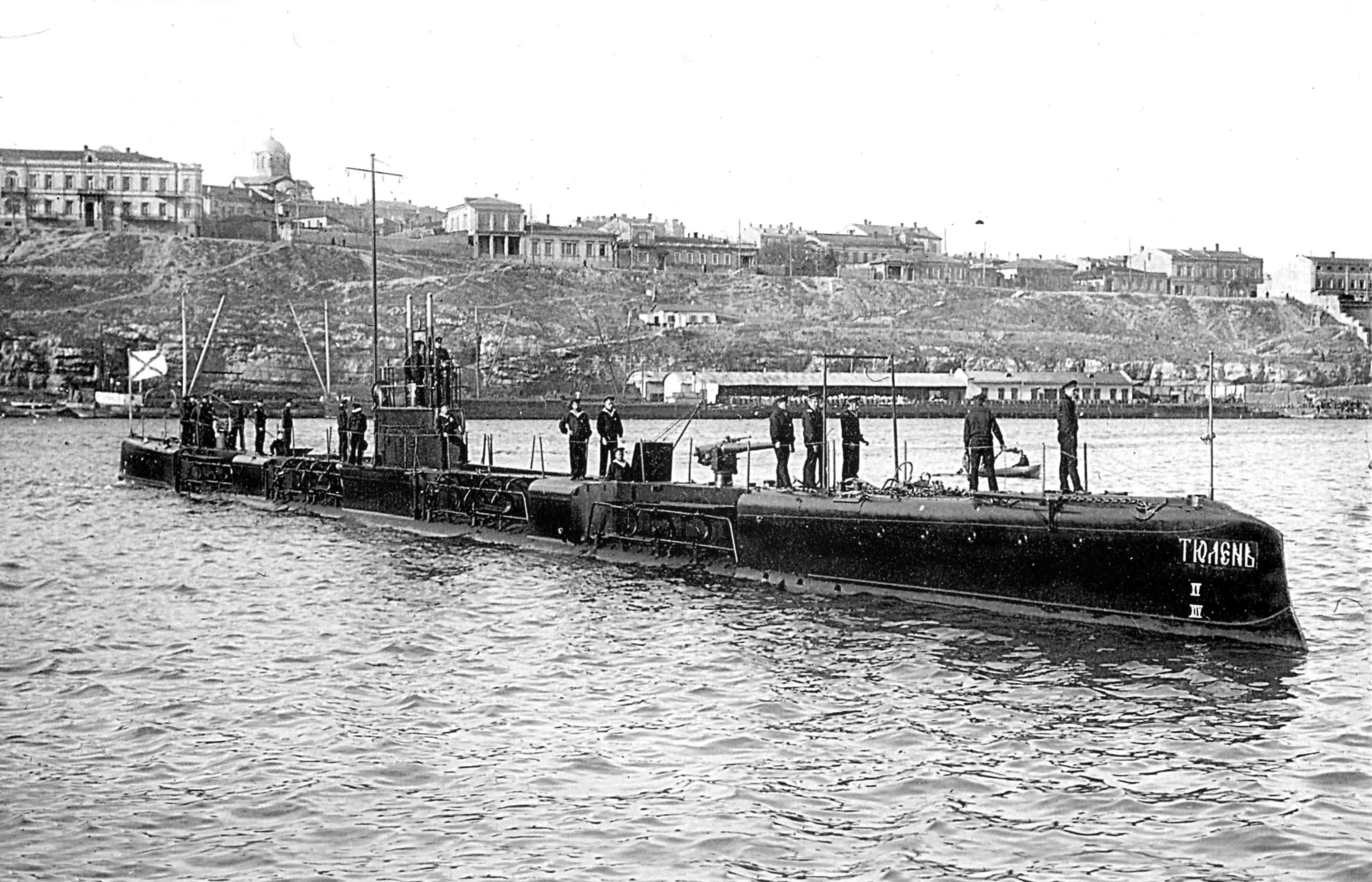
- Tyulen in Sevastopol in 1915.

History

Russian Empire and the Republic
- Name: Tyulen
- Namesake: Seal
- Builder: Nikolayev branch of the Baltic Yard
- Laid down: 16 August 1913
- Launched: 1 November 1913
- Completed: 19 March 1915
- Fate: Captured by Germany and Britain before entering the White Russian fleet, and evacuating to France. Sold for scrap in 1930.

General characteristics
- Class & type: Morzh-class submarine
- Displacement: 630 long tons (640 t) surfaced; 760 long tons (770 t) submerged
- Length: 67 m (219 ft 10 in)
- Beam: 4.5 m (14 ft 9 in)
- Draft: 3.9 m (12 ft 10 in)
- Propulsion: Diesel-electric; 500 hp (370 kW) diesel engine; 800 hp (600 kW) electric motor; 2 shafts
- Speed: 10.8 knots (20.0 km/h; 12.4 mph) surfaced; 8 knots (15 km/h; 9.2 mph) submerged
- Range: 2,500 nmi (4,600 km; 2,900 mi)
- Complement: 47 (4 officers and 43 enlisted sailors)
- Armament: 1 × 75 mm (3 in) and 1 × 57 mm (2 in) gun; 4 × 457 mm (18 in) torpedo tubes; 8 × torpedoes in Dzhevetskiy drop collars (later removed)

The Russian submarine Tyulen (Russian: Тюлень, lit. 'seal') was the third and last boat in the Morzh class of submarines of the Imperial Russian Navy. It was laid down in August 1913 and was launched in November 1913, though it did not enter service until March 1915. Built for the Black Sea Fleet, it saw action during World War I and became the most successful Russian submarine in the Black Sea, credited with sinking over 40 ships for a total tonnage of 8,973 gross register tons (GRT). It was also the second most successful Russian submarine in the war overall, after Volk.

In early 1915, Tyulen made several failed attempts to sink the German cruisers in the Black Sea, Goeben and Breslau. After that it focused on Ottoman merchant shipping, which transported coal to Constantinople from other parts of Anatolia, and sank many sailing ships and schooners. In July 1916 the submarine entered the Gulf of Varna to carry out reconnaissance on the Bulgarian naval base there, and in October, some of its crewmen boarded and captured a Turkish transport ship before bringing it back with them to Sevastopol. In May 1918, the German Army advanced into Crimea and took control of much of the Black Sea Fleet, including Tyulen. The British later acquired the submarine after Germany's surrender, and gave it to the White Army forces in September 1919. Tyulen was among Wrangel's fleet of ships that evacuated from Crimea in late 1920 during the Russian Civil War, and ended up in French Tunisia, where the submarine was eventually sold for scrap in 1930.

== Design and construction ==
After being defeated in the Russo-Japanese War, the Russian Empire began rebuilding its Navy. Initially the main focus of the naval arms programs was on the Baltic and Pacific fleets, but as tensions increased with Austria-Hungary due to the Bosnian crisis in 1908 and with Ottoman Turkey after the expansion of its navy, the Black Sea Fleet was given more attention. The 1911 naval program approved by the State Duma included the order of six submarines for the Black Sea Fleet, which ended up being three Morzh-class boats and three Narval-class. The naval engineer Ivan Bubnov was the designer of the Morzh class and developed it from his earlier submarine Akula, which was considered to be the most advanced of the Russian submarines at the time. In the years before the 1911 program, there was debate in the Imperial Russian Navy on whether to purchase and build the submarines designed by Ivan Bubnov, the chief submarine engineer of the Baltic Yard, or a foreign inspired design, based on the popular Holland type, which became known as the Narval class. Bubnov was supported by the Naval General Staff, while the foreign type was favored by members of the Naval Technological Committee. In the end, a conference led by Navy Minister Stepan Voevodskiy settled the matter by ordering three submarines of each class.

The Morzh-class submarines were well-armed for the time, and Tyulen differed from the others by having two deck guns instead of one, along with four internal torpedo tubes and eight Dzhevetskiy torpedo-launching collars. However, the vessel had numerous shortcomings. It suffered from having only a single hull, lacking bulkheads, having a slow diving time of 3 1/2 minutes due to poor ballast tank venting, and a diving depth of only 25 fathoms (150 ft; 46 m). An additional problem was that twin 1,140-horsepower (850 kW) diesel engines to power all three Morzh-class boats had been ordered from Germany, but were not delivered by the time World War I broke out. They had to be replaced by severely underpowered engines from the Amur River gunboats, each of which delivered only 250 horsepower (190 kW). This meant that the designed 16-knot (30 km/h; 18 mph) surface speed could not be attained. The designed 12-knot (22 km/h; 14 mph) underwater speed also could not be attained due to a poorly designed hull shape, which was more like that of a surface vessel than a submarine. The construction of all three Morzh-class boats began on 25 June 1911, and took place at the Nikolayev department of the Baltic Yard, which was specifically founded to build the Morzh class. In November 1913 Tyulen became the third and last of this class to be launched.

The engines and electric battery were installed in January 1915, with sea trials taking place until March 1915, which was when Tyulen entered service with the Imperial Black Sea Fleet. The Morzh-class boats were considered the best submarines in the Black Sea Fleet when they were completed.

== World War I service ==
=== 1915 ===
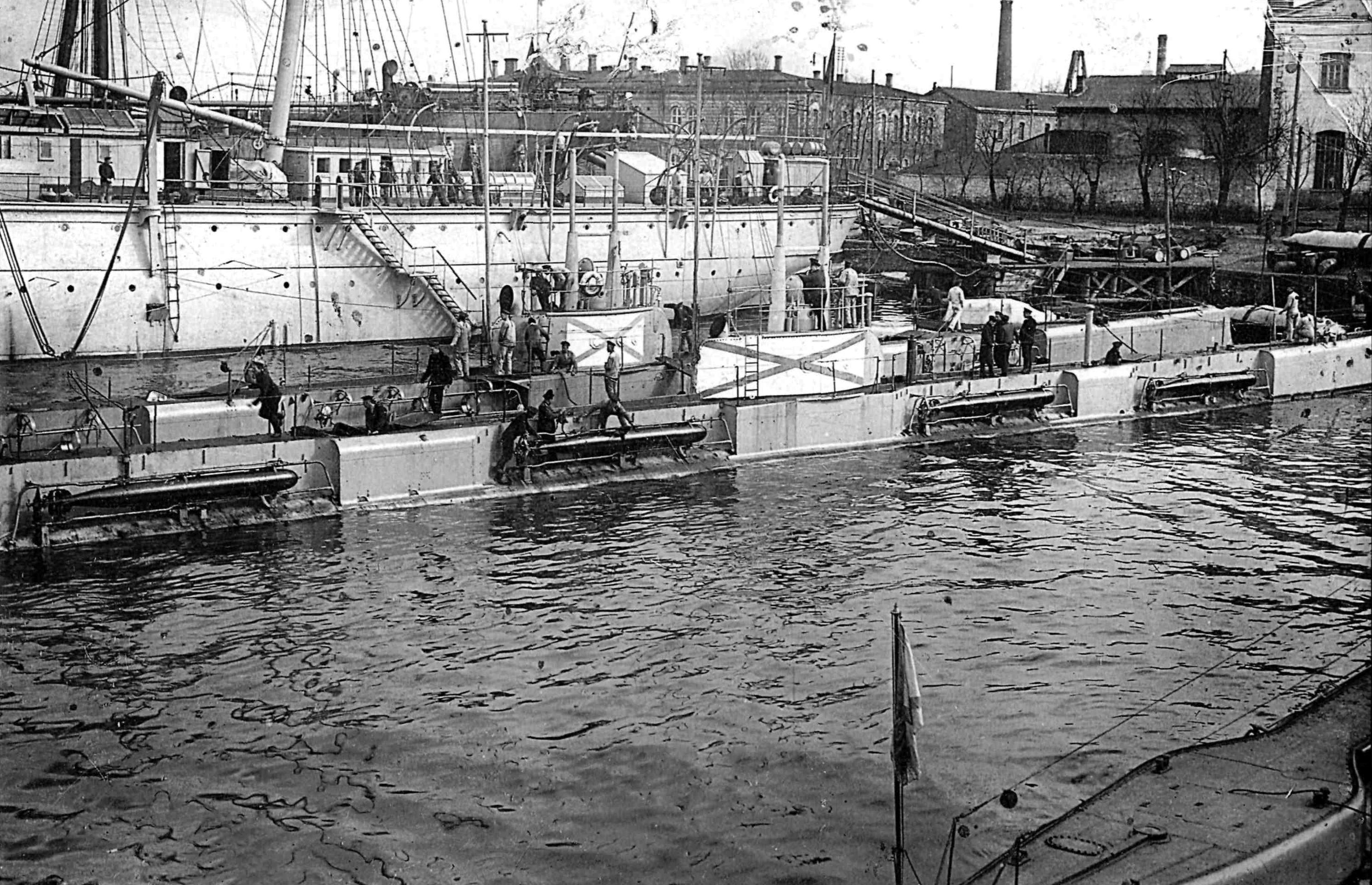
Tyulen behind its sister ship Nerpa, next to a submarine tender

When it joined the fleet, Tyulen was commanded by Senior Lieutenant Pyotr S. Bachmanov. The Black Sea Fleet spent the first months of the war in 1914 on the defensive, but in early 1915 this changed when the Stavka ordered its commander to attack the Bosporus and Constantinople in support of the French and the British Gallipoli campaign. The submarine's first mission in the spring of 1915 was patrolling the waters between the Bosphorus and Zonguldak, a coal-producing region of the Ottoman Empire. While on its third patrol, on 28 April 1915, Tyulen unsuccessfully tried to attack the German cruiser Goeben. From 7 to 15 May the submarine was on its fourth patrol, and it fired torpedoes at the cruiser Breslau near Zonguldak, though it was spotted before its attack and the torpedoes missed. Another failed attempt was made by Tyulen to attack Breslau on 28 May 1915, during its fifth patrol.

In the summer, Tyulen began focusing on transport ships, and on 14 June sank the Turkish coal transport Erdek. This was followed by the sinking of another coal transport, Taif, on 15 June, and more ships over the next several days. That patrol in June led to the sinking of nine Turkish ships by the Russian submarine. For the remainder of the year, Tyulen continued destroying Turkish transports, schooners, and other ships. On 10 August 1915, while on patrol together with its sister ship, the submarine Morzh, they raided an Ottoman convoy escorted by the cruisers Goeben and Hamidiye. In that attack, Tyulen sank a 1,545-ton coal transport. Senior Lieutenant Mikhail A. Kititsyn became the submarine's commanding officer in September 1915, and sank five ships over the next several months, for which he was awarded the Order of Saint Anna, 3rd and 4th classes, and the Order of Saint Stanislaus with swords. The Russian naval campaign in 1915 did not have any significant impact on the fighting in Gallipoli, but attacks on coal transports did undermine the Ottoman Empire's war effort, causing the German commanding admiral in the region, Wilhelm Souchon, to limit the actions of his ships to save fuel. But after Bulgaria entered the war, these losses were partly made up for by shipping coal overland from Germany.

=== 1916–17 ===
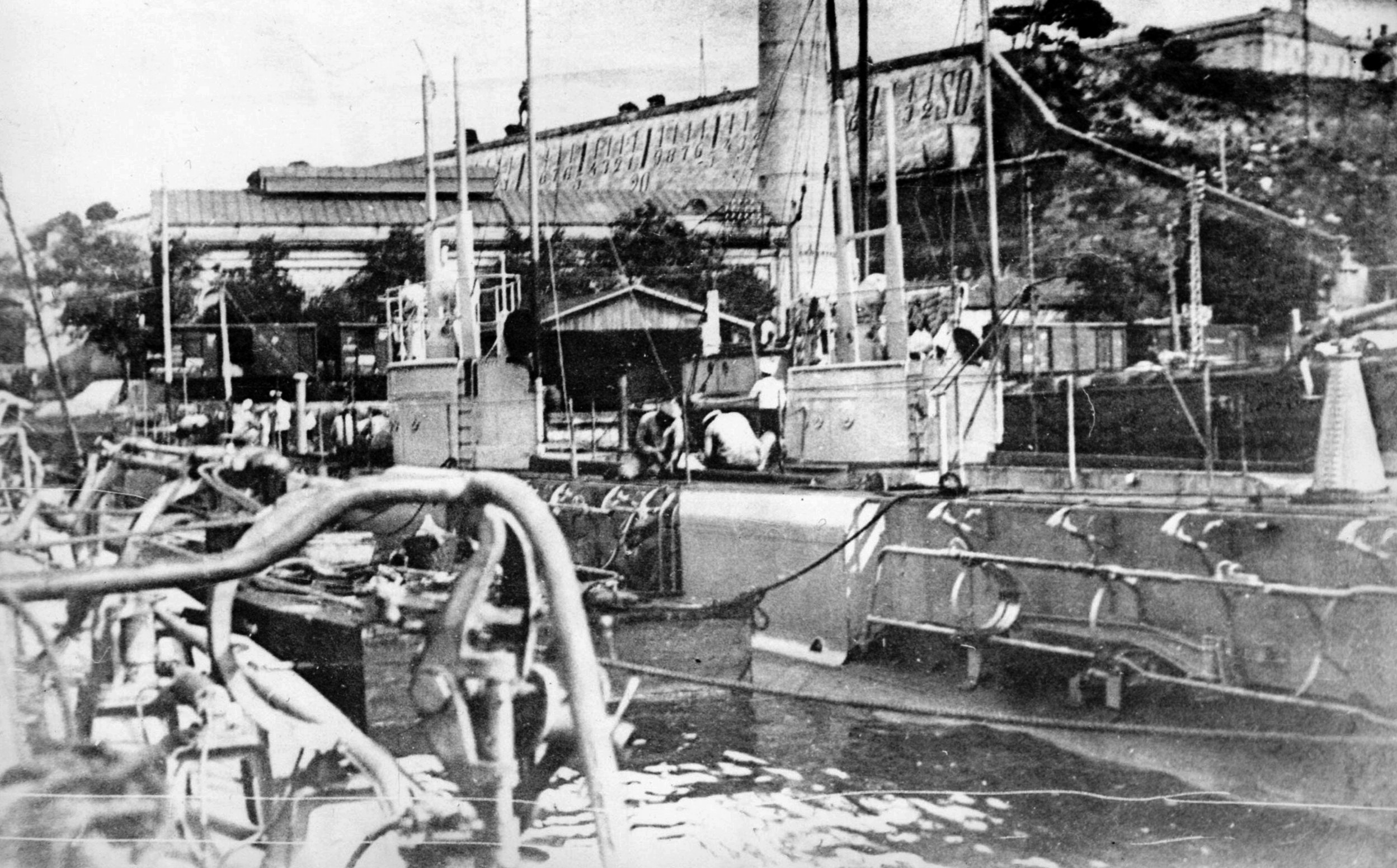
Tyulen and Morzh next to each other

The campaign against merchant shipping continued, and the submarine's commander, Kititsyn, increasingly began attacking while on the surface using artillery guns and ramming to destroy Turkish schooners. On a mission off the Bulgarian coast in May 1916, Tyulen destroyed four Turkish schooners escorting a coal ship using artillery, then captured and towed the transport to Sevastopol. Another vessel was captured in July 1916. Also that month, the submarine was able to enter the Gulf of Varna, the site of a Bulgarian naval base used by German U-boats, to chart the bay and its defenses. The crew of Tyulen spent 17 hours submerged, and Kititsyn later recalled that the air quality became so bad that it caused headaches for the crew from the higher levels of carbon dioxide. But the operation was a success, with Tyulen being able to accomplish its objectives without being seen or entering minefields. Its crew and captain were awarded decorations for the mission, and the information they gathered on the Varna naval base was used by the Black Sea Fleet to launch an air raid on it in late August 1916, using planes from three seaplane tenders, while the battleship Imperatritsa Ekaterina Velikaya and seven destroyers provided security.

Tyulen and the other Russian submarines in the Black Sea continued disrupting the shipping of coal from Anatolia to Constantinople for the rest of 1916. The most famous incident involving Tyulen took place on 11 October 1916, while it was on patrol near the Bosporus. Tyulen came across the 6,000-ton Turkish steamer Rodosto, and the submarine commander decided to capture the ship. The submarine began to approach, resulting in an artillery fight. None of the shells fired by the steamer could hit Tyulen, which fired back and scored hits, causing a fire to break out on board. Later the captain sent a team of crewmen and officers to board the steamer, where they took prisoner several German and Turkish crew members, including the German captain. The captured Turkish transport ship was brought back by the submarine to Sevastopol, and the entire crew of Tyulen were awarded the Cross of St. George for the achievement.

By early 1917, German and Ottoman naval activity in the Black Sea had been greatly reduced, and the main focus of the Black Sea Fleet became planning for naval landings in the Bosporus. The crews of the Black Sea Fleet were affected by the Russian Revolution, but to a lesser degree than the Baltic Fleet, and it remained active in combat operations. Under the Russian Provisional Government, the Black Sea Fleet continued to mount attacks along the Turkish coast for months after the February Revolution, and Tyulen destroyed several more ships that year. The outbreak of the October Revolution and the Bolsheviks agreeing to an armistice with the Central Powers in December 1917 ended Russian naval activity.

Under the command of Mikhail Kititsyn, who was promoted to Captain 2nd rank, the submarine Tyulen was credited with sinking over 40 enemy ships and capturing several, making it the highest achieving Russian submarine in the Black Sea. One estimate put the tonnage sunk by Tyulen at 8,973 gross register tons (GRT), which was the second most in the Russian Navy during the war, only behind Captain 1st rank Ivan Messer and his boat in the Baltic Sea, the submarine Volk.

== Russian Civil War and fate ==
After the armistice, the German Army advanced all the way to Crimea, and in May 1918 Tyulen was captured in Sevastopol by the Germans along with a large part of the Black Sea Fleet. The Germans intended to put some submarines and other captured ships to use, but they only commissioned one battleship into the German Navy before the war ended in November 1918. The submarine was then acquired by the British, who gave it to the White Russian movement in September 1919. Tyulen became part of the Armed Forces of South Russia, before joining Wrangel's Black Sea fleet. The fleet evacuated from Crimea in 1920 when the Bolsheviks reached it, and ended up seeking protection from France before being sent to the French Tunisian port of Bizerte.

Tyulen and the Russian fleet went to Tunisia at the end of December 1920, arriving at Bizerte. The St Andrew's flag, the naval ensign of the Imperial Russian Navy, was removed from the boat in October 1924. The submarine was sold for scrap by France in 1930.

=== Gallery ===
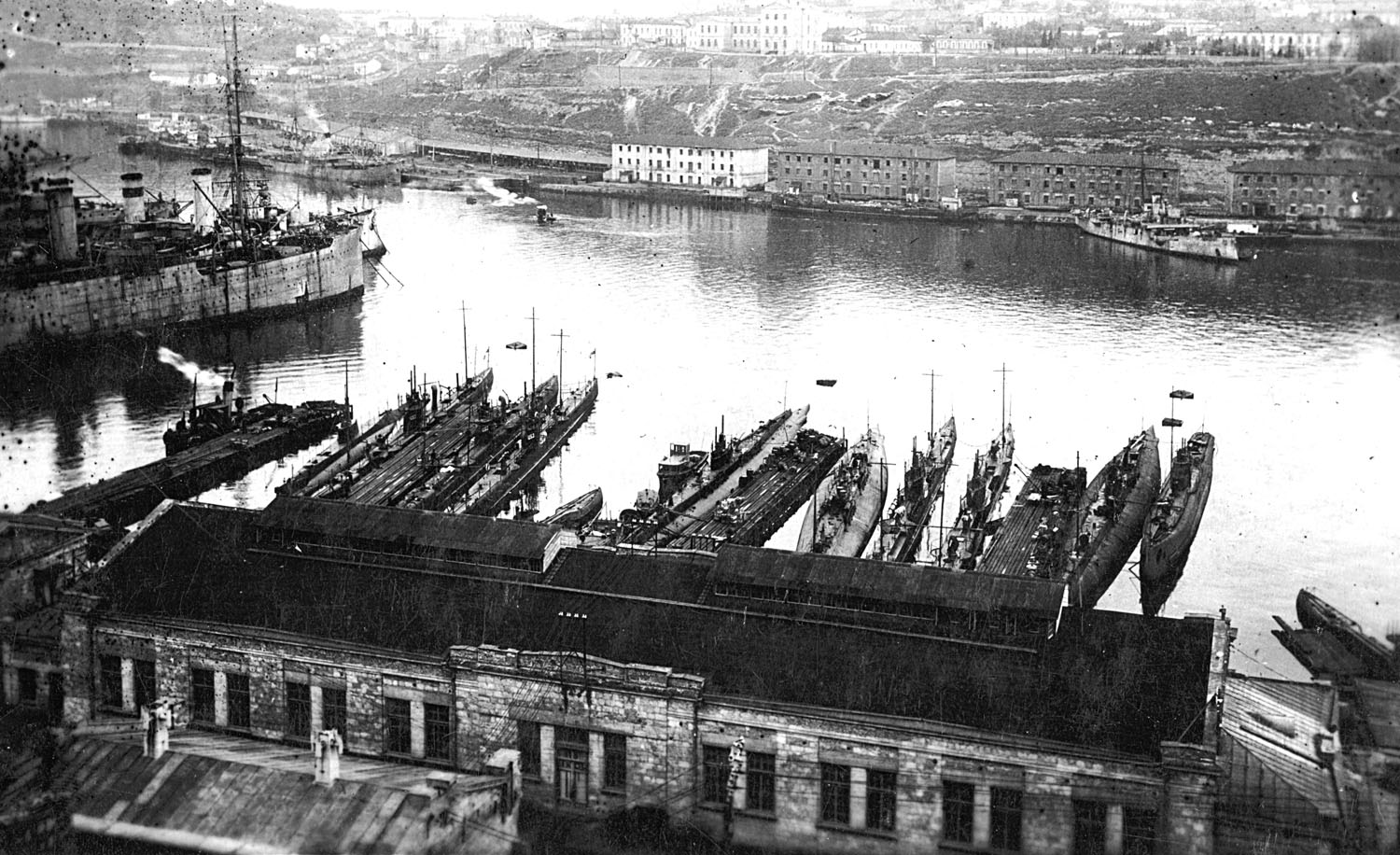
Submarines captured by the Germans at Sevastopol, 1918.

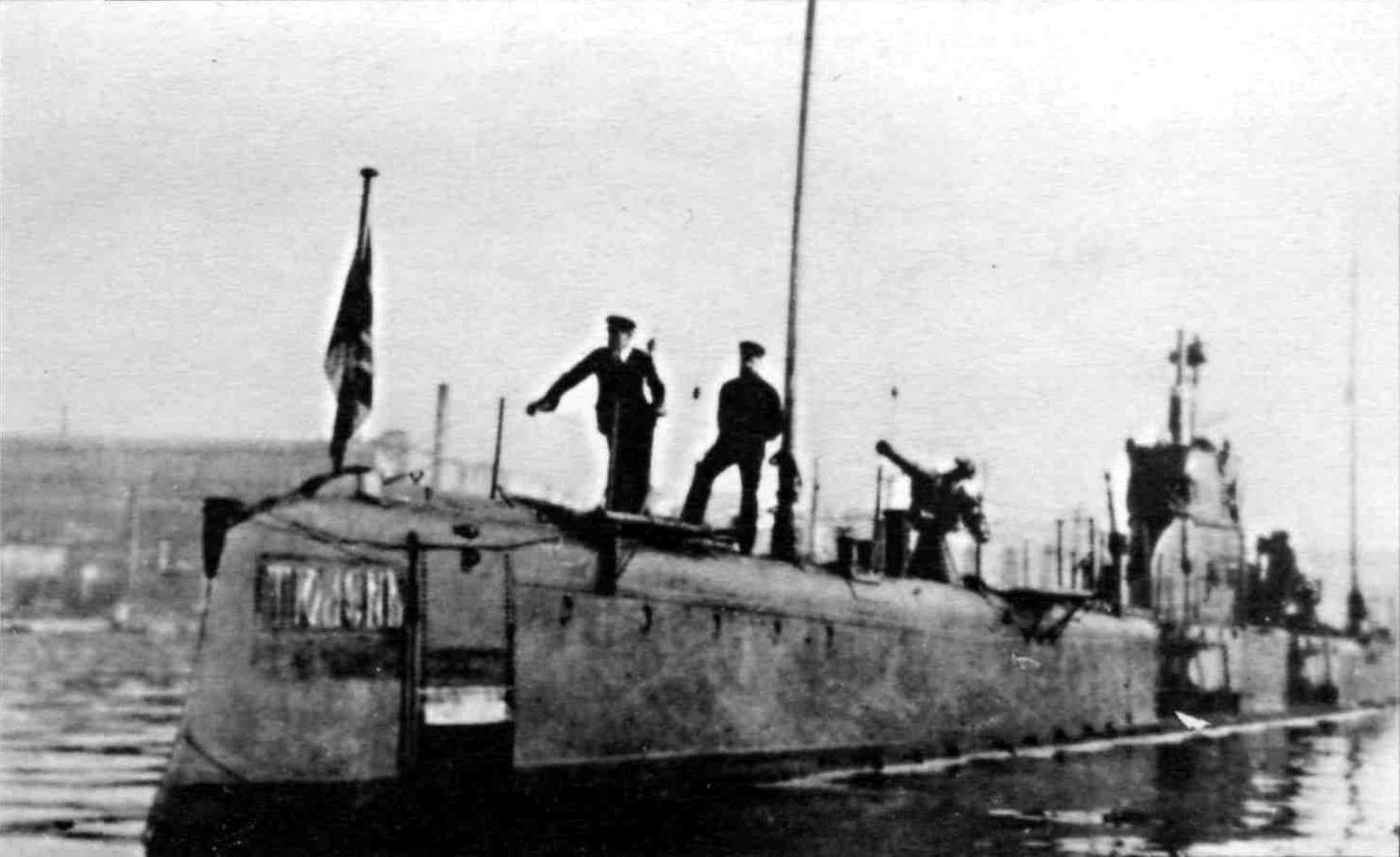
Tyulen in the White Russian navy, 1919.

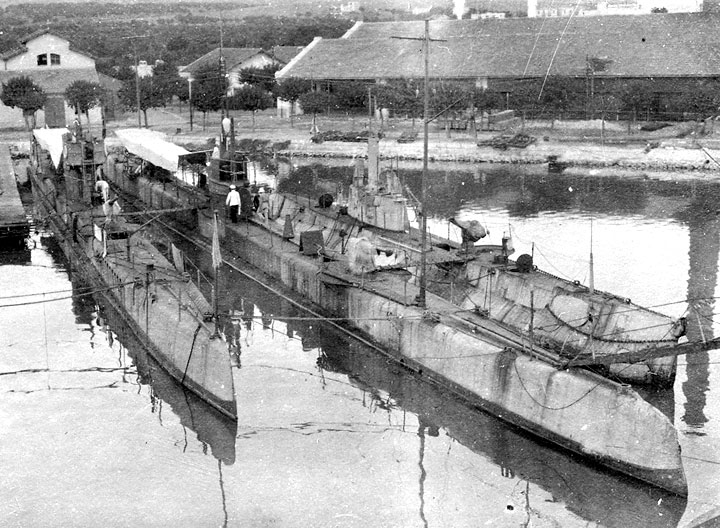
Tyulen (center) at Bizerte, French Tunisia, 1922

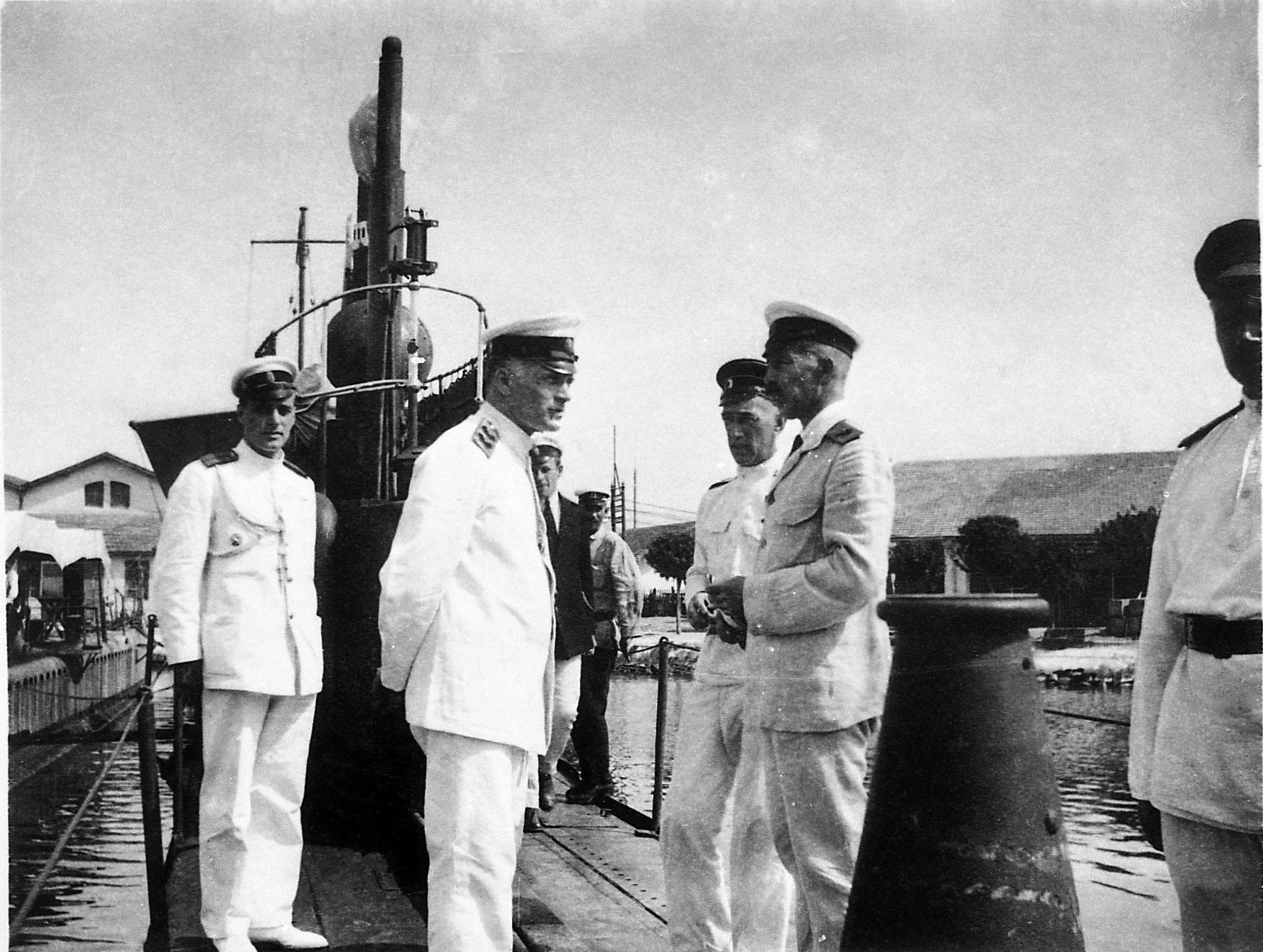
Russian admirals on the deck of Tyulen in Tunisia.
