= Morzh-class submarine =

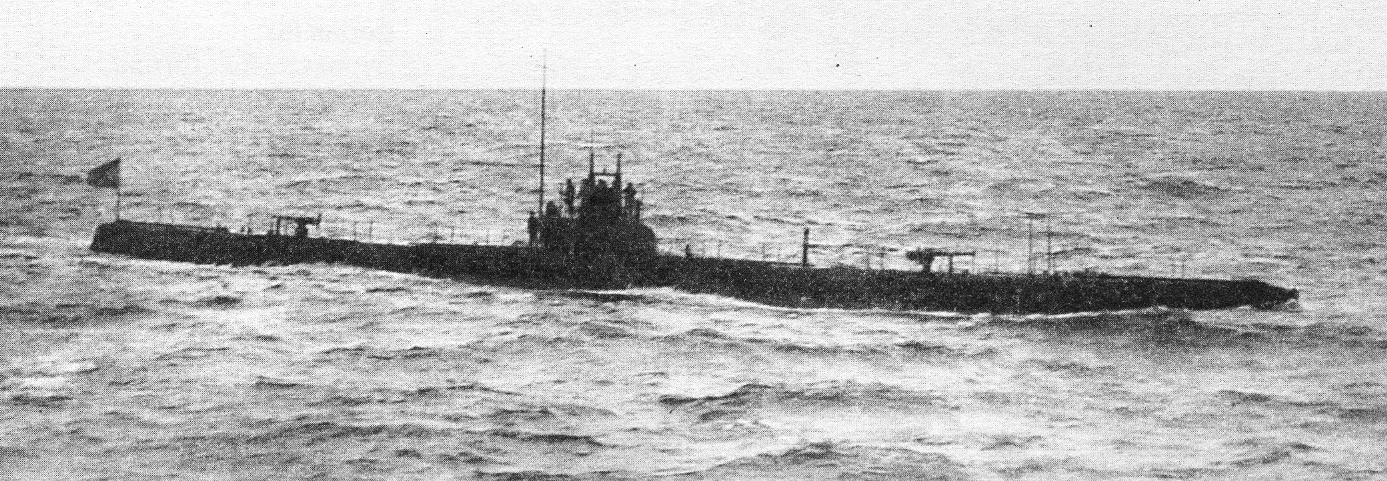
- Russian submarine Morzh

Class overview
- Name: Morzh class
- Builders: Nikolayev Dockyard
- Operators: Imperial Russian Navy; Soviet Navy
- Succeeded by: Bars class
- In commission: 1914–1931
- Completed: 3
- Lost: 1
- Scrapped: 2

General characteristics
- Type: Submarine
- Displacement: 630 long tons (640 t) surfaced; 760 long tons (770 t) submerged
- Length: 67 m (219 ft 10 in)
- Beam: 4.5 m (14 ft 9 in)
- Draft: 3.9 m (12 ft 10 in)
- Propulsion: Diesel-electric; 500 hp (370 kW) diesel engine; 800 hp (600 kW) electric motor; 2 shafts
- Speed: 10.8 knots (20.0 km/h) surfaced; 8 knots (15 km/h) submerged
- Range: 2,500 nmi (4,600 km)
- Complement: 47
- Armament: 1 × 57 mm (2 in) or 47 mm (2 in) gun; 4 × 457 mm (18 in) torpedo tubes; 8 × torpedoes in Dzhevetskiy drop collars (later removed)

The Morzh-class submarines (Russian: Подводные лодки типа «Морж», lit. 'walrus') were built for the Black Sea Fleet of the Imperial Russian Navy shortly before World War I.

== Background ==
The class was originally conceived as part of an ambitious programme of naval construction devised by the Naval General Staff in 1909. This envisaged, among other things, the construction of six submarines for the Black Sea Fleet. The procurement was heavily cut back and delayed; in 1910, the Russian State Duma agreed to a portion of the naval plan to reinforce the Black Sea Fleet, including the construction of the six submarines. Three Narval-class submarines were ordered along with three of the new Morzh-class boats. The Narval class was a design developed by the Holland company for Russia.

== Design ==
The design of the Morzh class was based on Akula, a vessel that was considered to be the most successful of the Russian-designed submarines built to date. The design of the new class was carried out at the Baltic Shipyard under Ivan Grigorevich Bubnov in 1910 and was approved on 30 May 1911, with construction starting at the Nikolayev shipyards on 25 June 1911. The principal objective of the designers was to deliver a high degree of maneuverability and stability. However, aspects of the design provoked controversy, in particular the lack of internal watertight compartments. This issue caused a heated dispute between Russia's submarine engineers and submarine officers; the engineers argued that adding bulkheads would greatly improve the vessel's ability to survive while the submariners argued that bulkheads put the commander of the ship at risk of losing control of his crew. In the end, financial constraints required the bulkheads to be omitted.

The Morzh submarines were well-armed for the time, having a deck gun, four internal torpedo tubes and eight Dzhevetskiy torpedo-launching collars. However, the vessels had numerous shortcomings. They suffered from having only a single hull, lacking bulkheads, having a slow diving time of 3 1/2 minutes due to poor ballast tank venting, and a diving depth of only 25 fathoms (150 ft; 46 m). An additional problem was that twin 1,140 horsepower (850 kW) diesel engines to power the vessels had been ordered from Germany, but were not delivered by the time the war broke out. They had to be replaced by severely underpowered engines from the Amur River gunboats, each of which delivered only 250 horsepower (190 kW). This meant that the designed 16-knot (30 km/h; 18 mph) surface speed could not be attained. The designed 12-knot (22 km/h; 14 mph) underwater speed also could not be attained due to a poorly designed hull shape, which was more like that of a surface vessel than a submarine. Many of these failings were replicated in the more numerous Bars-class submarines, built to a design derived from that of the Morzh.

== Ships in class ==
Ship	Laid down	Launched	Fate
Morzh (Морж)	25 June 1911	28 September 1913	Sunk by mines in the Black Sea, May 1917
Nerpa (Нерпа)	25 June 1911	28 September 1913	Recommissioned by the Soviet Navy in 1922 as Politruk. Decommissioned in 1930 and scrapped in 1931.
Tyulen (Тюлень)	25 June 1911	1 November 1913	Captured by the Germans in 1918, transferred to the White Russians in 1919. Fled to Bizerte in 1920 with Wrangel's fleet and was interned there. Sold in 1924 and scrapped in 1930.

== History ==
The ships were launched in September–November 1913 and were transferred to the naval base at Sevastopol between December 1914 - March 1915. Nerpa, the largest vessel in the class, was the first to go into action in March 1915, followed by Morzh and Tyulen later that same month. All three vessels operated principally off the Bosporus against German and Ottoman Turkish naval forces, focusing on the chokepoint of many Turkish freighter routes.

The three submarines had an eventful war in the Black Sea, sinking 16 merchant ships between them. Morzh narrowly missed the Turkish flagship battlecruiser Yavuz in November 1915 but suffered damage in a Turkish air attack in May 1916. She was sunk with all hands in May 1917 on her 24th patrol as a result of striking a mine, confirmed when wreck discovered in 2002. After 24 patrols Nerpa went into refit in 1917 in Nikolayev but had to be laid up due to a shortage of essential parts and did not rejoin the war effort. The most successful of the three submarines was Tyulen, which made a large number of successful attacks against enemy forces, including the capture of the armed merchantman Rodosto in October 1916.

Tyulen and Nerpa survived the war but had very different fates. Tyulen was captured by German troops at Sevastopol in May 1918 and transferred to British control in November 1918. It was passed on to White Russian forces under the command of General Pyotr Nikolayevich Wrangel, who opposed the Bolsheviks during the Russian Civil War. Following a Bolshevik advance, the vessel fled to Bizerte in French-ruled Tunisia in 1920, where it was interned. The ship was sold in 1924 and scrapped in 1930.

Nerpa remained in the shipyard at Nikolayev until 3 June 1922, when it was recommissioned by the Soviet Navy under the new name Politruk ("political instructor") and in 1923 it was given the designation of No. 11. The vessel was decommissioned on 3 December 1930 and was sold for scrap in February 1931.

== Sources ==
- Budzbon, Prezemyslav (1986). "Russia". In Gardiner, Robert & Gray, Randal (eds.). Conway's All the World's Fighting Ships 1906–1921. London: Conway Maritime Press. pp. 295–321. ISBN 0-85177-245-5.
- Polmar, Norman & Noot, Jurrien (1991). Submarines of the Russian and Soviet Navies, 1718–1990. Naval Institute Press. ISBN 0-87021-570-1.
