= Russian submarine Krab (1912) =

Imperial minelayer (1915–17)

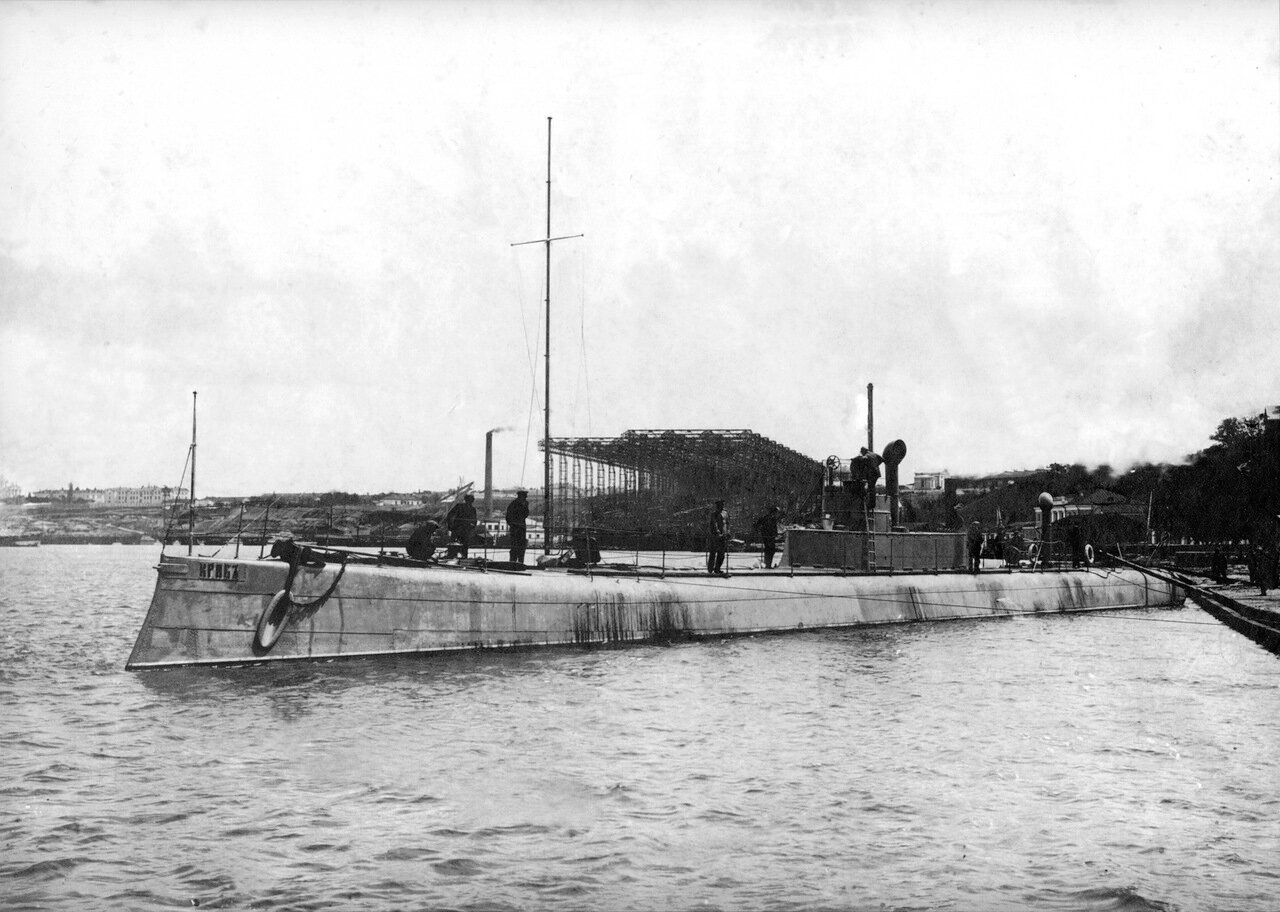
- Krab, c. 1913

History

Russian Empire
- Name: Krab
- Ordered: 1908
- Builder: Naval yard in Nikolayev, Ukraine
- Laid down: 1909
- Launched: 19 August 1912
- Commissioned: 25 June 1915
- In service: 1915 - 1917
- Fate: Scuttled, 26 April 1919, raised 7 October 1935 and scrapped

General characteristics
- Type: Minelaying submarine
- Displacement: 512 long tons (520 t) (surfaced); 722 long tons (734 t) (submerged)
- Length: 52.73 m (173 ft 0 in)
- Beam: 4.33 m (14 ft 2 in)
- Draft: 3.96 m (13 ft 0 in)
- Installed power: 1,200 bhp (1,200 PS; 890 kW) (gasoline); 660 bhp (670 PS; 490 kW) (electric)
- Propulsion: 2 shafts; 4 gasoline engines; 2 electric motors
- Speed: 11.8 knots (21.9 km/h; 13.6 mph) (surfaced); 7.1 knots (13.1 km/h; 8.2 mph) (submerged)
- Range: 1,700 nmi (3,100 km; 2,000 mi) at 8.6 knots (15.9 km/h; 9.9 mph) (surfaced); 82 nmi (152 km; 94 mi) at 4.13 knots (7.65 km/h; 4.75 mph)
- Test depth: 50 m (160 ft)
- Complement: 53
- Armament: 2 × bow 450 mm (18 in) torpedo tubes; 2 × 450 mm Drzewiecki drop collars; 1 × 75 mm (3.0 in) deck gun; 2 × 7.62 mm (0.30 in) machine guns; 60 × naval mines

Krab (Russian: Краб, lit. 'Crab') was a submarine minelayer built for the Imperial Russian Navy during the 1910s. Completed in 1915, she served with the Black Sea Fleet during the First World War and executed three war patrols in 1915-16 before going to Sevastopol for repairs. She was scuttled there in 1919 to prevent her capture by the Bolsheviks. The wreck was raised in 1935 and scrapped.

== Design and description ==
Krab was designed by Mikhail Petrovich Nalyotov as the world's first submarine minelayer in 1907, although due to construction delays the German UC submarines entered service earlier. The single-hulled boat displaced 512 metric tons (504 long tons) surfaced and 722 t (711 long tons) submerged. She had an overall length of 52.73 meters (173 ft), a beam of 4.33 meters (14 ft 2 in), and a draft of 3.96 meters (13 ft). Krab had a diving depth of 50 m (160 ft). Her crew numbered 53 officers and crewmen.

For surface running, Krab was powered by four gasoline engines, one pair per propeller shaft. The engines produced a total of 1,200 brake horsepower (1,217 PS; 895 kW), enough to give her a speed of 11.8 knots (21.9 km/h; 13.6 mph). When submerged each shaft was driven by a 330-brake-horsepower (335 PS; 246 kW) electric motor for 7.1 knots (13.1 km/h; 8.2 mph). The boat had a surface endurance of 1,700 nautical miles (3,100 km; 2,000 mi) at 8.6 knots (15.9 km/h; 9.9 mph) and 82 nmi (152 km; 94 mi) at 4.13 knots (7.65 km/h; 4.75 mph) submerged.

Krab was armed with a total of four 450-millimeter (17.7 in) torpedoes. Two of these were internal bow tubes and the others were in external rotating Drzewiecki drop collars, one on each broadside. She carried 60 PL-100 mines in two horizontal tunnels above the pressure hull. They were laid through the stern using an electrically powered chain conveyor. The boat was fitted with a 75 mm (3 in) deck gun and two 7.62 mm (0.300 in) machine guns in 1916.

== Service ==
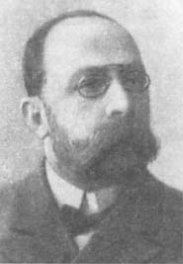
Mikhail Nalyotov

Krab was ordered in October 1908 and laid down in late 1909 at the Naval yard in Nikolayev (now Mykolaiv, Ukraine). The construction was delayed because of problems with the ballast tanks, but eventually she was launched on 19 August 1912. The submarine executed its first diving test on 22 June 1913. Krab proved to be insufficient stable and went back to the dockyard where 28 t (28 long tons) were added to her keel. This modification was completed in the autumn of 1914. Subsequent tests lasted until July 1915, and she was finally commissioned on 25 June 1915.

Krab was assigned to the Black Sea Fleet. She laid a first minefield on 27 June 1915 in the Bosporus. Two more minelaying operations in the same region were executed on 18 July 1916 and in September 1916. These minefields accounted for the sinking of the Turkish gunboat Isa Reis and the Bulgarian torpedo boat Shumni as well as several merchant ships. Krab may have laid the minefield that damaged the Ottoman light cruiser Midilli on 18 July 1915. In September 1916 the boat went to Sevastopol for repairs and remained there until the end of the war. Her crew joined the Ukrainian Navy in April 1918, but was captured by the Germans on 1 May who then transferred her to the British intervention force on 24 November. They scuttled the boat near Sevastopol on 26 April 1919 to prevent her capture by the Bolsheviks. The wreck was raised on 7 October 1935 and scrapped.
