= Russian Narval-class submarine =

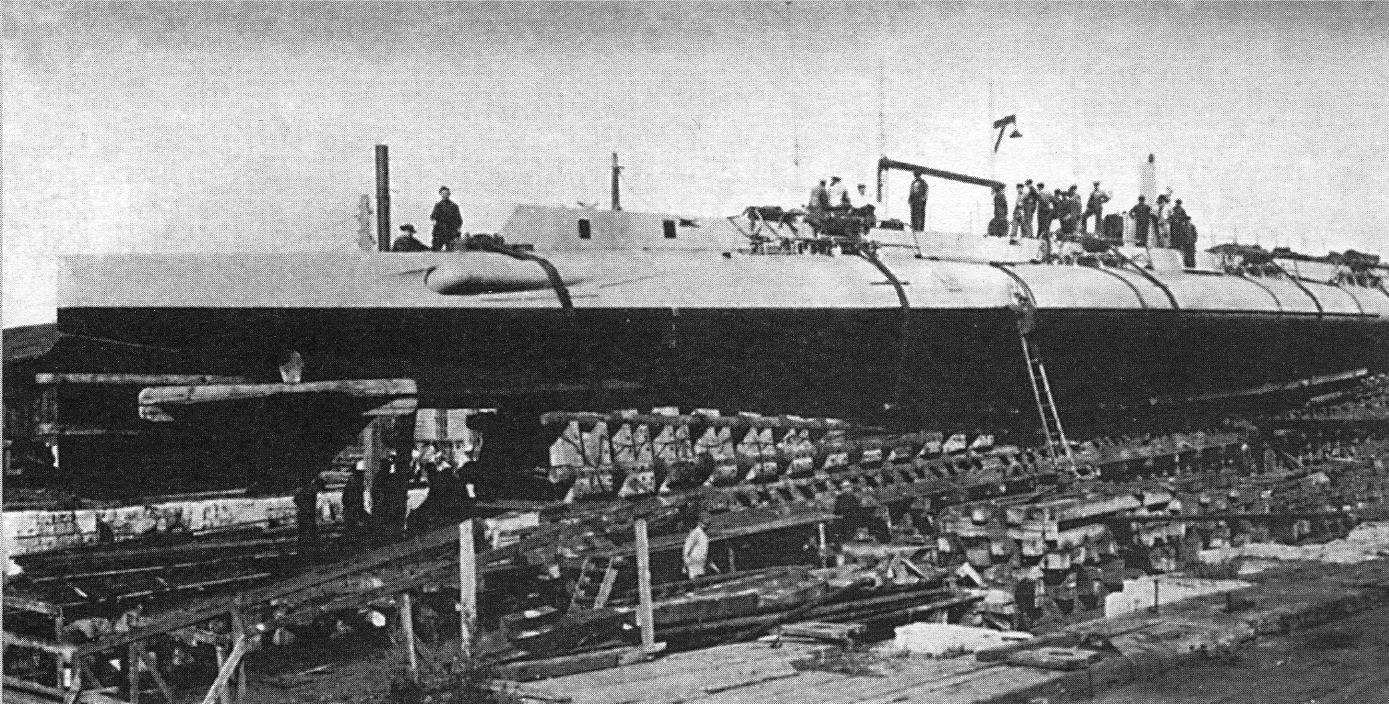
- Russian submarine Narval under construction

Class overview
- Name: Narval class
- Builders: Nikolayev Dockyard
- Operators: Imperial Russian Navy; Navy of the Ukrainian People's Republic
- In commission: 1914–1919
- Completed: 3
- Lost: 3

General characteristics
- Type: Submarine
- Displacement: 621 tons surfaced; 994 tons submerged
- Length: 70.1 m (230.0 ft)
- Beam: 6.5 m (21.3 ft)
- Draught: 3.5 m (11.5 ft)
- Installed power: 640 hp (480 kW) (diesel); 900 hp (670 kW) (electric)
- Propulsion: 2 shafts; Diesel-electric propulsion; 4 diesel engines (2 per shaft)
- Speed: 9.5 kn (17.6 km/h) (surfaced); 11.5 kn (21.3 km/h) (submerged)
- Range: 12 days, 3500 miles at 6.5 knots; 103 miles under water at 4 knots
- Complement: 47
- Armament: 2 × bow 450 mm (18-inch) torpedo tubes; 2 × stern 450 mm (18-inch) torpedo tubes; 8 × external torpedo drop collars; 1 × 75 mm gun; 1 × 57 mm gun; 2 × 7.62 mm machine guns; since 1917; 2 × bow 450 mm (18-inch) torpedo tubes; 2 × stern 450 mm (18-inch) torpedo tubes; 4 × external torpedo drop collars; 2 × 75 mm gun; 1 × 37 mm gun; 2 × 7.62 mm machine guns

The Narval class were a group of submarines built for the Imperial Russian Navy. They were designed by the Electric Boat Company and ordered in the 1911 programme as the "Holland 31A" design (the Electric Boat company designation was EB31A). The Narval class had advanced features including watertight bulkheads, a crash-diving tank and gravitationally filled ballast tanks which did not feature in contemporary Russian-designed boats. The boats were well regarded by the Russian Navy and served in the Black Sea Fleet during World War I, during which they sank 8 merchant ships and 74 coastal vessels.

At the end of 1917, the submarines were transferred to the reserve. The submarines were scuttled by British forces in April 1919 near Sevastopol.

== Ships ==
Three submarines were built by Nikolayev Dockyard.

Name	Cyrillic	Meaning	Launched	Fate
Narval	Нарвал	Narwhal	11 April 1915	Scuttled in Sevastopol 26 April 1919
Kit	Кит	Whale	May 1915	Scuttled in Sevastopol 26 April 1919
Kashalot	Кашалот	Sperm whale	22 August 1915	Scuttled in Sevastopol 26 April 1919

Kit was raised by EPRON in 1934, but the hulls of the other two boats remain on the bottom in the place they were scuttled. The whereabouts of Narval was unknown until October 2014, though some historians believe it was virtually discovered by the Soviet underwater laboratory Bentos-300 back in 1980. In June 2018, a joint expedition of the Russian Geographical Society's Sevastopol branch, the Ministry of Defence and Sevastopol State University was undertaken to examine the wreck of five submarines, including Narval and Kashalot, by using a remotely operated underwater vehicle. It was reported in May 2019 that the wreck site is to be listed as a cultural heritage.

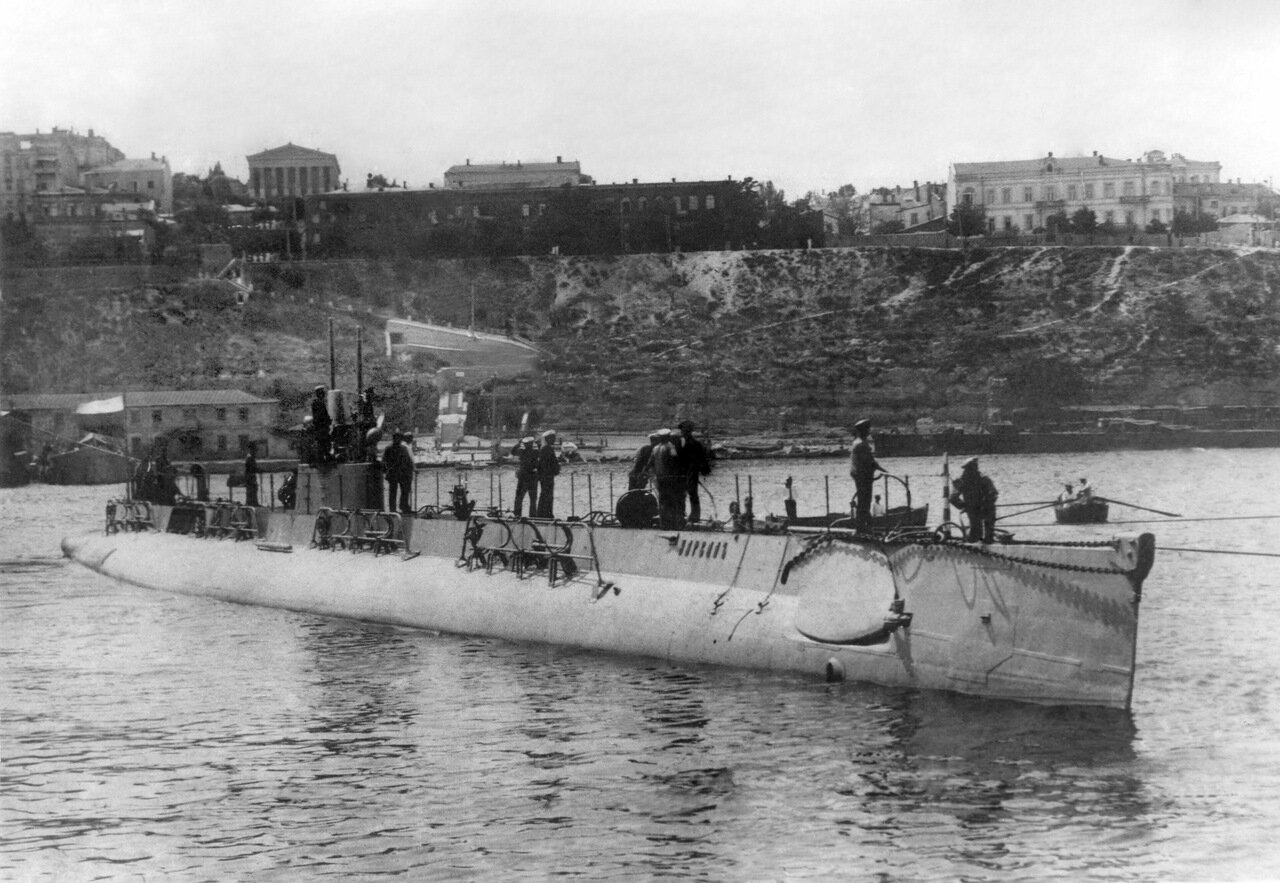
Narval at Yuzhnaya Bay in Sevastopol

== Bibliography ==
- Apalkov, Yu. V. (1996). Боевые корабли русского флота: 8.1914-10.1917г [Combat Ships of the Russian Fleet: 8.1914-10.1917] (in Russian). ИНТЕК. ISBN 5-7559-0018-3.
- Budzbon, Przemysław (1985). "Russia". In Gray, Randal (ed.). Conway's All the World's Fighting Ships 1906–1921. Naval Institute Press. pp. 291–325. ISBN 0-85177-245-5.
- Friedman, Norman, US Submarines through 1945: An Illustrated Design History, Naval Institute Press, 1995, ISBN 1-55750-263-3.
- Polmar, Norman & Noot, Jurrien (1991). Submarines of the Russian and Soviet Navies, 1718–1990. Naval Institute Press. ISBN 0-87021-570-1.
- Zablocki V.P. Submarines "Narwhal". Marine Collection 12/2011.
