= Boris Malinin =

Soviet shipbuilder (1889 - 1949)

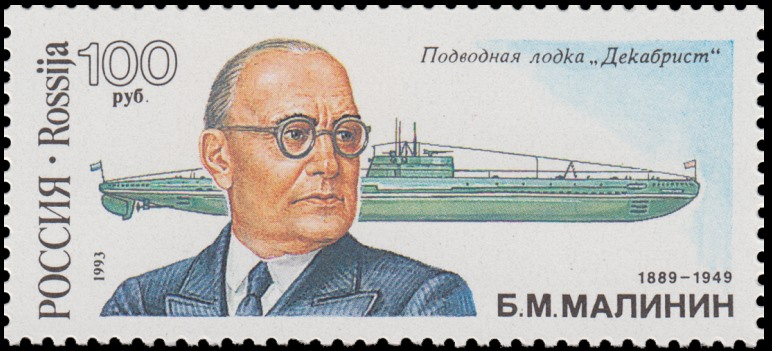
Stamp of Boris Malinin of 1993

Boris Mikhailovich Malinin (Russian: Борис Михайлович Малинин; 13 February 1889 – 27 September 1949) was a Soviet shipbuilding scientist and graduate of Saint Petersburg Polytechnical Institute.

His father was the operatic singer Mikhail Malinin, his mother was the operatic singer Varvara Nikolskaya, and his sister was the famous Soviet navigator Marina Raskova.

From 1926 to 1940, he was the chief designer of the majority of Soviet submarines, including the Dekabrist-class, Leninets-class, Shchuka-class, and Malyutka-class.

In 1913 at the age of 24, he designed and built the Bars-class submarine Volk (Russian: ВОЛК; Wolf). Later, in May 1916, under the command of Captain Ivan Messer, the Volk destroyed three German transports.

Beginning on 4 November 1926, under Malinin's leadership the Technical Bureau No.4 managed submarine construction at the Baltic Shipyard. The name Technical Bureau No.4 was given to the former Submarine Department, and is still a secret department. In subsequent years, 133 submarines were built to the designs developed under Malinin's leadership.

In the 1950s the tradition continued when his son K. B. Malinin while serving as a naval officer provided sketches of what would later become the world's first ballistic missile submarines. Along with fellow officers B. F. Vasilyev, V. V. Bashenkov, and N. I. Petelin, their ideas and sketches were the basis of the preliminary specifications drawn up by the Technical Design Bureau (TsKB-16 (Volna)). The bureau's designs included the conversion of six Zulu-class attack submarines to launch Scud missiles; this work led to the design of the Golf-class ballistic submarine.
