= Dekabrist-class submarine =

Class of Soviet submarines

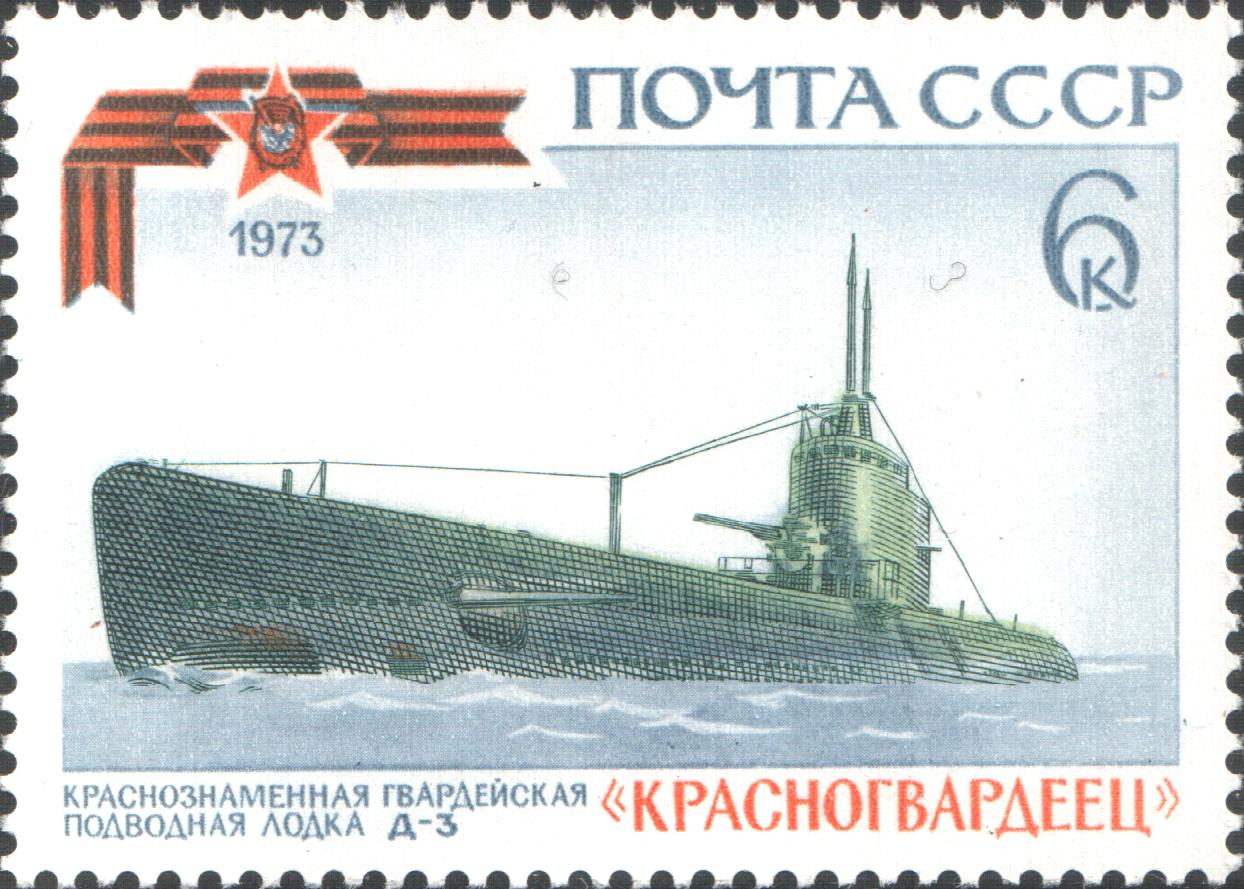
- D-3 Krasnogvardyeyets on a Soviet stamp

Class overview
- Name: Dekabrist
- Builders: 3 at Ordzhonikidze Shipyard, Leningrad; 3 at Marti Yard, Nikolayev
- Operators: Soviet Navy
- Preceded by: Bars class (Imperial Russian Navy)
- Succeeded by: Leninets class
- Built: 1927–1929
- In service: 1928–1958
- Planned: 6
- Completed: 6
- Lost: 4
- Retired: 1
- Preserved: 1

General characteristics
- Type: Diesel-electric attack submarine
- Displacement: 933 tons surfaced; 1,354 tons submerged
- Length: 76.00 m (249 ft 4 in)
- Beam: 6.5 m (21 ft 4 in)
- Draught: 3.80 m (12 ft 6 in)
- Propulsion: 2 shafts, three-bladed propellers; - Two 1,100 hp MAN/Kolomna diesels; - Two 525 hp PG-20 electric motors; - Two electric creeping motors 50 hp; - 60 DK storage batteries
- Speed: 14 knots (26 km/h) surfaced; 9 knots (17 km/h) submerged
- Range: 7,500 nmi (13,900 km) at 9 kn (17 km/h) surfaced; 132 nmi (244 km) at 2 kn (3.7 km/h) submerged
- Test depth: 295 ft (90 m)
- Complement: 53 officers and crew
- Armament: 8 21-inch (533 mm) torpedo tubes (6 bow, 2 stern), 14 torpedoes carried; 1 × 100 mm/51 cal. main deck gun; 1 × 45 mm/46 cal. K-21 AA gun; 1 × 7.62 mm machine gun

The Dekabrist class, also known as Series I, were the first class of submarines built for the Soviet Navy after the October Revolution of 1917. They were authorized in the Soviet Naval Shipbuilding Program of 1926, marking the revival of submarine design in Russia, and began their sea trials in 1930.

Of the six vessels built, two survived World War II, and one submarine of the class is now a museum ship.

== Design and construction ==
A set of performance and design criteria for the new submarine type, known as an "operational-tactical requirement", was formulated in 1923, but converting this into reality posed challenges. The Red Navy of the 1920s retained a respectable submarine fleet and associated practical skills in construction and maintenance, but was lacking in recent design experience. No new Russian submarine design had been brought into production since the Bars class, the plans for which had been finalised in 1912, and associated specialist knowledge had diminished, while there was a sense that the latest foreign submarine technology was now considerably more advanced. Thus, in an attempt to obtain up-to-date design information, Boris Malinin was attached to a Soviet naval mission which embarked on a tour of shipyards in Western Europe in 1925.

Although Germany's socialist government persuaded their reluctant navy to share some older designs from the First World War, sources agree that the most useful information was obtained in Italy. However, statements of what was acquired are very inconsistent. The memoirs of Sergei Bazilevsky, a younger designer who subsequently joined Malinin's team on the Dekabrist project in 1927, state that the mission had obtained plans of the Italian submarine Ballila, but modern sources do not agree on which submarine is meant. Some authorities state that these were plans for the brand-new ocean-going Balilla-class submarine, impressively large boats (1,450 tons surface displacement, 86.5 metres long) which had been laid in down in early 1925. Others assert that they were instead the plans of a much older and smaller submarine of the same name, laid down as far back as 1913 (717 tons surface displacement, 65 meters long), which had been obtained in a second-hand bookshop in Rome, and were of little real value. Adding to the confusion, there are also claims that the delegation obtained plans from the Italian shipyard Cantieri dell'Adriatico. Presumably this is a reference to CRDA, but this conglomerate was only formed in 1929-1930 and was not directly involved with either of the Ballila designs. Probably related to this is a claim that Malinin obtained plans for the Pisani class built by one of CRDA's precursors CNT, construction work on which was just beginning during the delegation's visit to Italy. Alternatively, it may be relevant that CRDA - meaning presumably one of its precursors, CNT or STT - are credited with involvement in the underlying design work on the deep-diving double hull design used by the new Ballila class.

Regardless of exactly what information the Soviet delegation obtained, they acquired some insights into Italian submarine technology: most obviously, while the Soviet fleet consisted of boats of "single-hull" construction in which equipment such as ballast tanks was largely contained inside the pressure hull, the Italians had pioneered double–hull construction in which equipment was placed around the outside of the pressure hull, enclosed by a separate external fairing known as the "light hull", allowing a more streamlined exterior and a more spacious interior (the new Balilla class of the 1920s was built this way, though neither the older Balilla of 1913, nor the Pisani class); in addition, whereas existing Soviet boats had a diving depth limited to around 50 metres (160 ft), the Italians were building stronger hulls capable of diving to around 100 metres (330 ft) (used on the new Balilla and the Pisani), and while previous Russian submarines had a hull length of no more than 70 metres (230 ft) and a surface displacement of below 700 tons, the Italians were building much larger submarines - the new Ballila was twice this displacement and about 20% longer. Another important difference was that existing Soviet boats filled the ballast tanks mechanically during a dive, while the Italians simply flooded them via seacocks.

Many parallels to the Italian design tradition can be identified in the new Dekabrist design, particularly in the hull structure and ballast arrangements: the heavy gauge of the pressure hull, designed to withstand depths of 90 meters (300 ft) (and constructed using high-quality armour plate from scrapped battlecruisers), the double-hull design, which enclosed the pressure hull in a separate "light hull" and housed the main ballast tanks in the space in between, the division of the interior of the submarine into multiple watertight compartments (though as the design evolved, the original Italian-style spherical bulkheads, designed to maximize the integrity of key compartments, were replaced with flat circular ones), the use of Italian-style ballast tanks, which was expected to speed up diving time, and the addition of a crash dive tank amidships, which as Bazilevsky recounts was misinterpreted as being designed to dive quickly from periscope depth rather than directly from the surface, and reduced in relative size compared with the one in the Italian blueprints, though it proved possible to scale it up again when its intended purpose was discovered. At 76 metres (249 ft) in length, and with a surfaced displacement of around 1,000 tons, they were significantly larger than any earlier submarines in the Soviet fleet (or any built in Imperial Russia), though not as large as the new Italian Balilla class. Their quoted range of over 7,000 nautical miles (13,000 km; 8,100 mi) was also a dramatic improvement, although not quite as impressive as that of the larger Balilla.

That said, it is clear that Dekabrist was not simply a copy of an Italian design, but a synthesis of Italian concepts and existing Soviet knowledge, although the most easily recognizable native features are ones that were not strictly necessary in the new design. The pressure hull was scaled up from the proven Bars class, which was regarded as something of a benchmark for reliability, though its streamlining seems unnecessary in a double-hulled boat; while the presence of extra ballast tanks beneath the deck casing (apparently intended for quick diving from periscope depth) was also clearly based on this type, and they are described as being equally unnecessary in conjunction with the Italian-inspired diving system. Other features which resemble older Russian designs include the relatively large ballast tanks at the bow and stern, now employed as trim tanks, and the placing of the batteries in sealed compartments in the forward hull. In general, individual components were either based directly on those used in existing Russian boats, or else newly designed.

Armament consisted of a heavy forward salvo of six torpedo launchers in the bow, and two more at the stern, designed for the 21-inch torpedoes which had become the standard international calibre, though until a suitable weapon entered production, older 18-inch torpedoes had to be carried, using special inserts to hold them in place. As originally designed, each submarine was to have two 4-inch guns in streamlined gun shields which formed fairings at the front and back of the conning tower, but the configuration was subsequently modified in imitation of the British L-class submarine, with a single forward-facing gun on a raised platform protected by a high bulwark, designed to make it easier to fight the gun in heavy seas. A new anti-aircraft version of the gun was also adopted.

An unusual design feature inherited from pre-revolutionary designs was an anchor designed to allow the submarine to secure itself against the seabed while submerged, though on the Dekabrist class this caused alarming incidents in early trials, and may never have been used subsequently.

An order of six boats was divided equally between the Baltic and the Black Sea Fleets of the Soviet Navy: three vessels were constructed by the Ordzhonikidze Shipyard in Leningrad, and the other three at the Marti Yard at Nikolayev. They were given names commemorating historical revolutionary movements (the Baltic boats being Dekabrist, Narodovolets and Krasnogvardyeyets, after the Decembrists, Narodnaya Volya and the Red Guards, later designated D-1 through D-3, their Black Sea counterparts being Revolutsioner, Spartakovets and Yakobinets, i.e. "Revolutionary", "Spartacist" and "Jacobin", later designated D4 through D-6). The first boat in the class was laid down on March 5, 1927; launched on November 3, 1928, and commissioned on November 18, 1930. This first boat, Dekabrist, was later designated D-1 on September 15, 1934.

The initial dockyard trials of the type were not entirely successful. Early diving trials on the Revolutsioner in March 1930 revealed that the boat listed sharply to one side during diving, a problem which the designers knew had also been encountered by double-hulled German designs like U-139. Similar problems were encountered on Dekabrist two months later, with the boat listing to port and then sharply over correcting to starboard. Although no agreement could be reached on the precise scientific reasons, an acceptable solution was found by separating the ballast tanks more strictly into port and starboard units which flooded separately and thus more symmetrically. Bazilevsky later insisted that the only real problem was an asymmetrical weight distribution, which could be corrected by a small quantity of ballast, but which had not been detected at the start of the trial due to a miscalibrated inclinometer. Information on diving speed is hard to come by. However they were reported to be good sea-boats, and reached speeds of 15.3 knots (28.3 km/h; 17.6 mph) (surfaced) and 8.7 knots (16.1 km/h; 10.0 mph) (submerged) on trials.

== Service history ==
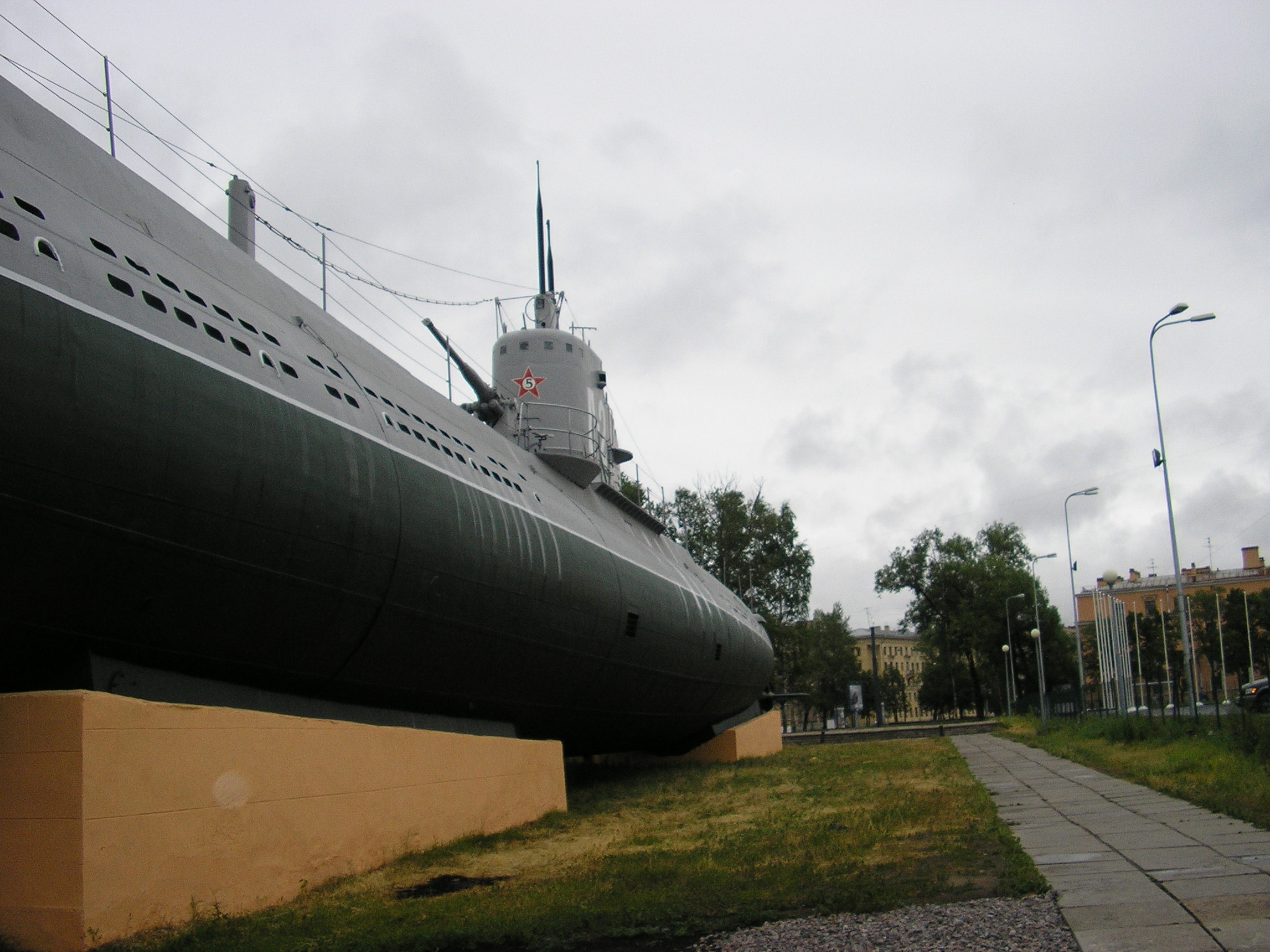
Narodovolets on display in St Petersburg

In May 1933 the three Baltic boats were transferred to the Northern Fleet, in the Arctic Ocean, via the White Sea–Baltic Canal, and are said to have shown high seaworthiness in polar circumstances, although D-1 was lost with her entire crew in a diving accident on November 13, 1940, in Motovsky Gulf.

The other five were in service at the start of the Great Patriotic War, although three more were lost in action during the conflict: D-3 was sunk off Norway in June 1942, D-6 was scuttled at Sevastopol in November 1942, and D-4 was sunk off Crimea in December 1943.

Spartakovets served throughout with the Black Sea Fleet. Narodovolets was undergoing a refit at Leningrad at the start of the German invasion, and thus became part of the Baltic Fleet – her most notable success being the sinking by torpedo of the German merchant ship SS Jacob Fritzen (4,090 gross register tons) in October 1942. Narodovolets was converted to a training role in the 1950s, but served until the 1980s, and subsequently became a museum ship and war memorial.

== Ships ==
Number	Ship	English translation	Builder	Launched	Notes&Fate
D-1	Dekabrist; Декабрист	A member of the Decembrist revolt	Ordzhonikidze Yard, Leningrad	3 November 1928	Lost in accident 13 November 1940 in Motovsky Gulf near Murmansk during training mission.
D-2	Narodovolets; Народоволец	A member of Narodnaya Volya	Ordzhonikidze Yard, Leningrad	19 May 1929	Sank German merchant ship Jacobus Fritzen. Decommissioned 1958 but from 1956 to 1987 was based in Kronstadt and served as a training ship. Finally, in 1989 on completion of the reconstruction was installed on shore as a memorial museum in St Petersburg.
D-3	Krasnogvardyeyets; Красногвардеец	Red Guardsman	Ordzhonikidze Yard, Leningrad	12 July 1929	Lost after 10 June 1942 off Norway, possibly due to mines.
D-4	Revolutsioner; Революционер	Revolutionary	Marti Yard, Nikolayev	12 March 1929	Sunk German merchant ships Boy Federson, Santa Fé and Bulgarian merchant Varna. Lost off western Crimea after 1 December 1943, possibly due to mines.
D-5	Spartakovets; Спартаковец	Follower of Spartacus	Marti Yard, Nikolayev	12 October 1929	Sank Turkish sailing vessel Koiboglu on 8 December 1942. Broken up at Sevastopol after 18 January 1956.
D-6	Yakobinets; Якобинец	Jacobin	Marti Yard, Nikolayev	15 November 1930	While under repairs, destroyed and scuttled 12 November 1941 at the Sevastopol dockyard by her own crew to prevent capture by the advancing Germans. Raised after the war and broken up.

== See also ==
- Russian ship naming conventions
