= Bars class submarine =

Bars-class submarine can refer to:

- Bars-class submarine (1915), a class of 24 submarines of the Imperial Russian Navy
- Bars-class submarine (1986), an alternate name in some sources for the Shchuka-B class of Soviet submarines (NATO reporting name 'Akula'-class)
