= Russian submarine Burevestnik =

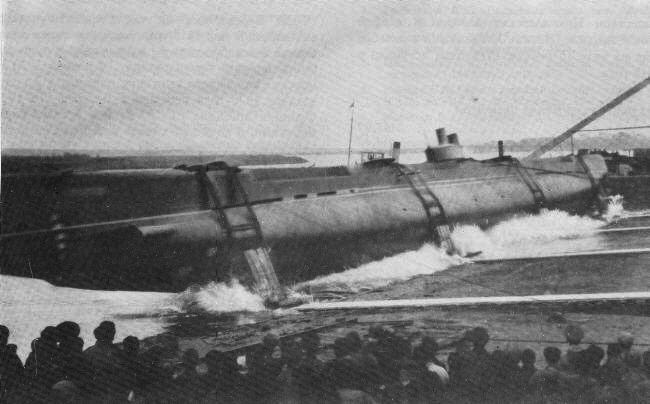
- Launch of Burevestnik, 1916

History

Russian Empire
- Name: Burevestnik
- Namesake: Storm Petrel
- Launched: 15 November 1916
- Commissioned: October 1917, or January 1918
- Captured: 2 May 1918 (German occupation forces): November 1918 (Allied occupation forces): transferred to Wrangel Fleet
- Fate: Scrapped, 1924

General characteristics
- Class & type: Bars class submarine
- Displacement: 650 tons surfaced; 785 tons submerged
- Length: 223 ft (68.0 m)
- Beam: 15 ft (4.57 m)
- Draft: 13 ft (3.96 m)
- Propulsion: Diesel-electric; 2,640 hp diesel (as designed); 900 hp electric; 2 shafts
- Speed: 18 knots (33 km/h) surfaced; 9 knots (17 km/h) submerged
- Range: 400 nmi (740 km)
- Complement: 33
- Armament: 1 × 75 mm (3.0 in) gun; 1 × 37 mm (1.5 in) AA gun; 4 × 457 mm (18.0 in) torpedo tubes; 8 × torpedoes in drop collars

Russian submarine Burevestnik ("Petrel") was a Bars class submarine of the Imperial Russian Navy. She was built at Nikolaev on the Black Sea during the First World War but was not completed before the end of hostilities. She served with the White Russian forces for two years before being interned in Bizerte with Wrangel's fleet. She was broken up in 1924.

== Service history ==
Burevestnik was laid down at the Nikolaev Naval shipyard in October 1915 and launched there on 15 November 1916, but was not completed for another year (sources vary between October 1917 and January 1918). She was stationed with the Black Sea Fleet at Sevastopol but saw no action due to the cessation of hostilities in December 1917. In May 1918, she was seized by German occupation forces and renamed SM US-1, but was not commissioned by the German Navy. In November 1918, with the German surrender, she was taken over by the Anglo-French intervention force and transferred to the Whites under General Wrangel. In November 1920, she was part of the evacuation of Wrangel's fleet and was interned at Bizerte in French North Africa. In 1924, she was recognized by the French as the property of the Soviet government but did not return to the USSR and was later scrapped at Bizerte.

== Bibliography ==
- Budzbon, Przemysław (1985). "Russia". In Gray, Randal (ed.). Conway's All the World's Fighting Ships 1906–1921. Naval Institute Press. pp. 291–325. ISBN 0-85177-245-5.
- Polmar, Norman & Noot, Jurrien (1991). Submarines of the Russian and Soviet Navies, 1718–1990. Naval Institute Press. ISBN 0-87021-570-1.
