= Russian submarine Bars =

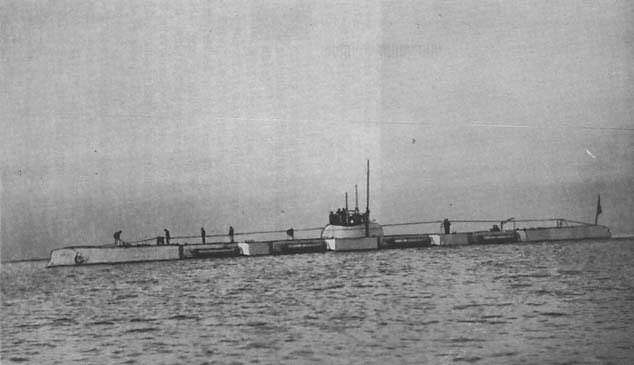
- Russian submarine Bars

History

Russian Empire
- Name: Bars
- Namesake: Leopard
- Launched: 2 June 1915
- Commissioned: 12 July 1915
- Fate: Lost May 1917; cause undetermined *

General characteristics
- Class & type: Bars class submarine
- Displacement: 650 tons surfaced; 780 tons submerged
- Length: 223 ft (68.0 m)
- Beam: 15 ft (4.57 m)
- Draft: 13 ft (3.96 m)
- Propulsion: Diesel-electric; 2,640 hp diesel (as designed); 900 hp electric; 2 shafts
- Speed: 9.5 knots (17.6 km/h) surfaced; 7.5 knots (13.9 km/h) submerged
- Range: 3,065 nmi (5,676 km)
- Complement: 33
- Armament: 1 × 75 mm (3.0 in) gun, 1 × 57 mm (2.2 in) gun; 4 × 457 mm (18.0 in) torpedo tubes; 8 × torpedoes in drop collars

Russian submarine Bars ("Leopard") was a warship, the lead submarine of her class, built for the Imperial Russian Navy during the First World War. She was active in the Baltic and was lost there in 1917.

== Design ==
Bars was ordered under the 1913 Programme for the Baltic Fleet, and was laid down at the Baltic shipyard in St. Petersburg. She was powered by diesel/electric propulsion, though a shortage of diesel engines meant the boats were equipped with a variety of machinery, as it became available. Armament, too, varied as to availability; Bars was armed with one 75 mm and one 57 mm gun, Conway states about two 63 mm guns.

The design originally had external torpedoes as well as internal torpedo tubes; these were carried in drop-collars in recessed niches low in the hull. Trials with Bars showed these to be unsuitable and subsequent vessels had the niches and drop-collars moved to the upper deck; Bars was refitted to this pattern in 1916.

Bars was launched on 2 June 1915 and entered service the following month.

== Service history ==
Bars entered service with the Baltic Fleet on 12 July 1915. She undertook 14 war patrols in the Baltic, targeting German warships during the 1915 ice-free season, but with little success.

In 1916 she was employed attacking German iron-ore shipments along the Swedish coast, though again with little success, due to the restrictions imposed by Swedish neutrality.

== Fate ==
In May 1917, Bars left port on her last patrol, and did not return. It is suggested by some that she was sunk in a depth-charge attack by German patrol boats on 28 May 1917, though other sources suggest she was lost in a minefield off Norrköping. The actual cause of her loss is unknown. In 1993, wreck of Bars was found and identified near Gotska Sandön at the depth 120 m.
