= HMS Vittoria (1917) =

Destroyer of the Royal Navy

Coordinates: 60°5′N 28°23′E

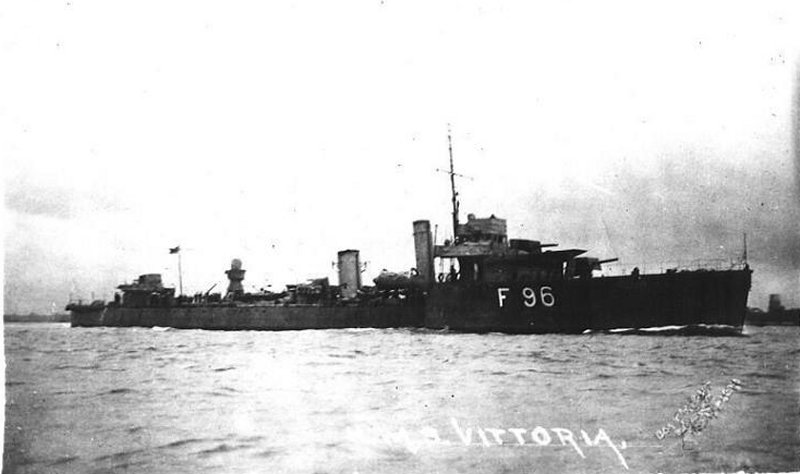
- HMS Vittoria

History

United Kingdom
- Name: HMS Vittoria
- Namesake: Battle of Vitoria
- Builder: Swan Hunter, Tyne and Wear
- Launched: 29 October 1917
- Fate: Torpedoed in the Gulf of Finland, 31 August 1919

General characteristics
- Class & type: Admiralty V-class destroyer
- Displacement: 1,272–1,339 long tons (1,292–1,360 t)
- Length: 300 ft (91.4 m) o/a, 312 ft (95.1 m) p/p
- Beam: 26 ft 9 in (8.2 m)
- Draught: 9 ft (2.7 m) (standard), 11 ft 2 in (3.4 m) (deep)
- Installed power: 27,000 shp (20,000 kW)
- Propulsion: 2 × Brown-Curtiss steam turbines; 3 × Yarrow-type water-tube boilers; 2 × shafts
- Speed: 34 kn (39 mph; 63 km/h)
- Range: 3,500 nmi (4,000 mi; 6,500 km) at 15 kn (17 mph; 28 km/h), 900 nmi (1,000 mi; 1,700 km) at 32 kn (37 mph; 59 km/h)
- Capacity: 320–370 long tons (325–376 t) fuel oil
- Complement: 110
- Armament: 4 × QF 4 in Mk V (102mm L/45), 2 × QF 2-pdr Mk.II "pom-pom" (40 mm L/39) or; 1 × QF 12-pdr 20 cwt, 4 × 21 inch (533 mm) torpedo tubes (2x2)

HMS Vittoria was a British destroyer of the Admiralty V-class. She was converted to a minelayer.

During Allied intervention in the Russian Civil War it was torpedoed by the Bolshevik submarine Pantera off the island of Seiskari in the Gulf of Finland on 31 August 1919.

The sunken destroyer was given to the state of Finland on 12 December 1919 together with her sister ship Verulam; however, when salvaging began in 1925, it was found that both ships were broken in two and impossible to repair.

In November 2013, Russian divers rediscovered the wreck at a depth of 30 meters (98 feet), at a location inside what is now Russian territorial waters.

== Bibliography ==
- Colledge, J. J.; Warlow, Ben (2006) [1969]. Ships of the Royal Navy: The Complete Record of All Fighting Ships of the Royal Navy from the 15th Century to the Present (3rd Rev ed.). London: Chatham Publishing. ISBN 978-1-86176-281-8. OCLC 67375475.
- Cocker, Maurice (1981). Destroyers of the Royal Navy, 1893–1981. Ian Allan. ISBN 0-7110-1075-7.
- Friedman, Norman (2009). British Destroyers From Earliest Days to the Second World War. Annapolis, Maryland: Naval Institute Press. ISBN 978-1-59114-081-8.
- Gardiner, Robert & Gray, Randal, eds. (1985). Conway's All the World's Fighting Ships 1906–1921. Annapolis, Maryland: Naval Institute Press. ISBN 0-85177-245-5.
- March, Edgar J. (1966). British Destroyers: A History of Development, 1892–1953; Drawn by Admiralty Permission From Official Records & Returns, Ships' Covers & Building Plans. London: Seeley Service. OCLC 164893555.
- Preston, Antony (1971). 'V & W' Class Destroyers 1917–1945. London: Macdonald. OCLC 464542895.
- Raven, Alan & Roberts, John (1979). 'V' and 'W' Class Destroyers. Man o'War. Vol. 2. London: Arms & Armour. ISBN 0-85368-233-X.
