= HMS Verulam (1917) =

Destroyer of the Royal Navy

Coordinates: 60°1′N 28°22′E

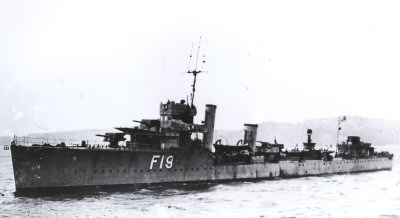
- HMS Verulam in 1918

History

United Kingdom
- Name: HMS Verulam
- Builder: R. & W. Hawthorn, Leslie and Company, Hebburn
- Launched: 3 October 1917
- Fate: Sunk on 3–4 September 1919

General characteristics
- Class & type: Admiralty V-class destroyer
- Displacement: 1,272-1,339 tons
- Length: 300 ft (91.4 m) o/a, 312 ft (95.1 m) p/p
- Beam: 26 ft 9 in (8.2 m)
- Draught: 9 ft (2.7 m) standard, 11 ft 3 in (3.4 m) deep
- Propulsion: 3 Yarrow type Water-tube boilers; Brown-Curtis steam turbines, 2 shafts, 27,000 shp
- Speed: 34 kn
- Range: 320-370 tons oil, 3,500 nmi at 15 kn, 900 nmi at 32 kn
- Complement: 110
- Armament: 4 × QF 4-inch naval gun Mk V, mount P Mk.I; 2 × QF 2 pdr Mk.II "pom-pom" (40 mm L/39) or; 1 × 12 pounder 12 gun Mk.I (76 mm), mount HA Mk.II; 4 (2x2) tubes for 21 in torpedoes

HMS Verulam was an Admiralty V-class destroyer of the Royal Navy. She was built by Hawthorn Leslie and was launched on 3 October 1917. She struck a mine off the island of Seiskari in the Gulf of Finland on the night between 3–4 September 1919, and sank killing 16 crew.

The sunken destroyer was given to the state of Finland on 12 December 1919 together with her sister ship Vittoria; however, when salvage efforts began in 1925, it was found that both ships were broken in two and impossible to repair.

== Bibliography ==
- Commonwealth War Graves Commission (2020). "Results of sailors of Verulam KIA". CWGC.
- Colledge, J. J.; Warlow, Ben (2006) [1969]. Ships of the Royal Navy: The Complete Record of All Fighting Ships of the Royal Navy from the 15th Century to the Present (3rd Rev ed.). London: Chatham Publishing. ISBN 978-1-86176-281-8. OCLC 67375475.
- Cocker, Maurice. Destroyers of the Royal Navy, 1893–1981. Ian Allan. ISBN 0-7110-1075-7.
- Friedman, Norman (2009). British Destroyers From Earliest Days to the Second World War. Annapolis, Maryland: Naval Institute Press. ISBN 978-1-59114-081-8.
- Gardiner, Robert & Gray, Randal, eds. (1985). Conway's All the World's Fighting Ships 1906–1921. Annapolis, Maryland: Naval Institute Press. ISBN 0-85177-245-5.
- March, Edgar J. (1966). British Destroyers: A History of Development, 1892–1953; Drawn by Admiralty Permission From Official Records & Returns, Ships' Covers & Building Plans. London: Seeley Service. OCLC 164893555.
- Preston, Antony (1971). 'V & W' Class Destroyers 1917–1945. London: Macdonald. OCLC 464542895.
- Raven, Alan & Roberts, John (1979). 'V' and 'W' Class Destroyers. Man o'War. Vol. 2. London: Arms & Armour. ISBN 0-85368-233-X.
