= Noblessner =

Port in Tallinn, Estonia

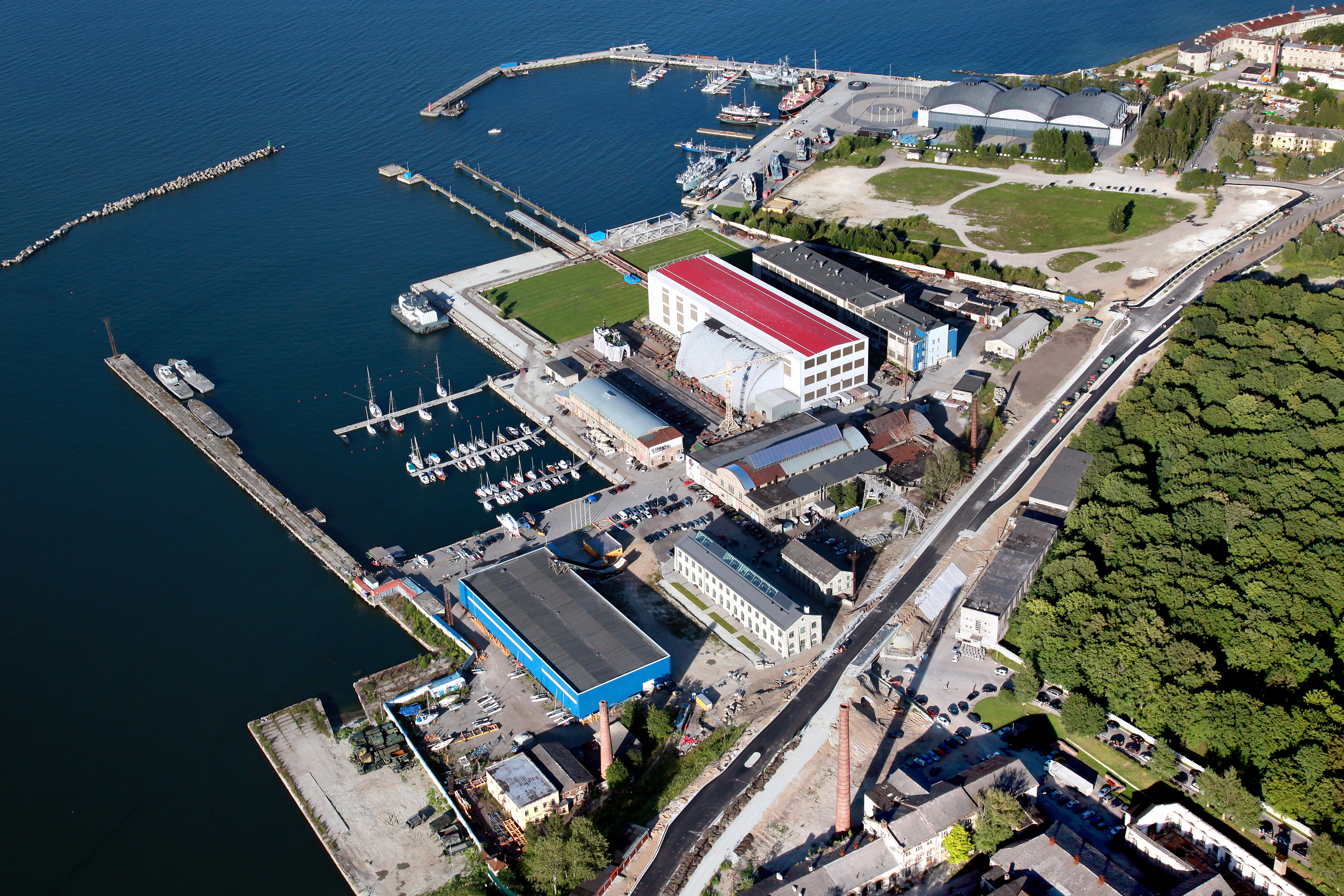
- Aerial view of Noblessner, 2015

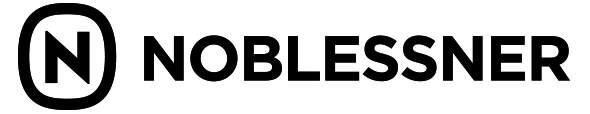
- Click on the map for a fullscreen view

Location
- Country: Estonia
- Location: Põhja-Tallinn
- Coordinates: 59°27′18″N 24°44′07″E

Statistics
- Website noblessner.ee

Noblessner (also known as Peetri sadam) is a harbour and former industrial area in the northern district of Tallinn, Estonia. Since 2013 it has been redeveloped into a cultural and residential area with a museum, art centre, craft brewery, marina, seafront promenade and cafes and restaurants.

== History ==
Noblessner's history dates back to 1912 when Emanuel Nobel (nephew of Alfred Nobel) and Arthur Lessner founded the Russian Empire's most important submarine factory. The name "Noblessner" is a fusion of the two men's surnames.

The factory built a total of 12 modern submarines in Noblessner between 1913 and 1917. An order for an additional 20 ocean submarines came in 1916, but due to the 1917 October Revolution, they never started making them. After Estonian independence in 1918 the shipyard started manufacturing smaller vessels instead of submarines. In 1925 the shipyard declared bankruptcy due to the lack of orders, and smaller enterprises also involved in shipbuilding divided the buildings among themselves. The various enterprises merged at the beginning of the Soviet occupation. In 1944–1951 the shipyard operated as Tallinn Marine Factory (Tallinna Meretehas) and it repaired the Baltic Fleet’s minesweepers. Over the following decades, the shipyard was renamed Marine Factory No. 7 and Shipyard No. 7. The company built vessels for the Soviet Navy and repaired whaling vessels and fishing trawlers. In 1991, when Estonia restored its independence, the shipyard became the Tallinn Marine Factory again. The last vessels were built in 2018.

== Buildings of Noblessner ==
Today, many of the historic industrial buildings in Noblessner have found new life through repurposing and rehabilitation. Constructed primarily in the 1910s, the buildings of Noblessner represent typical industrial design from the era.

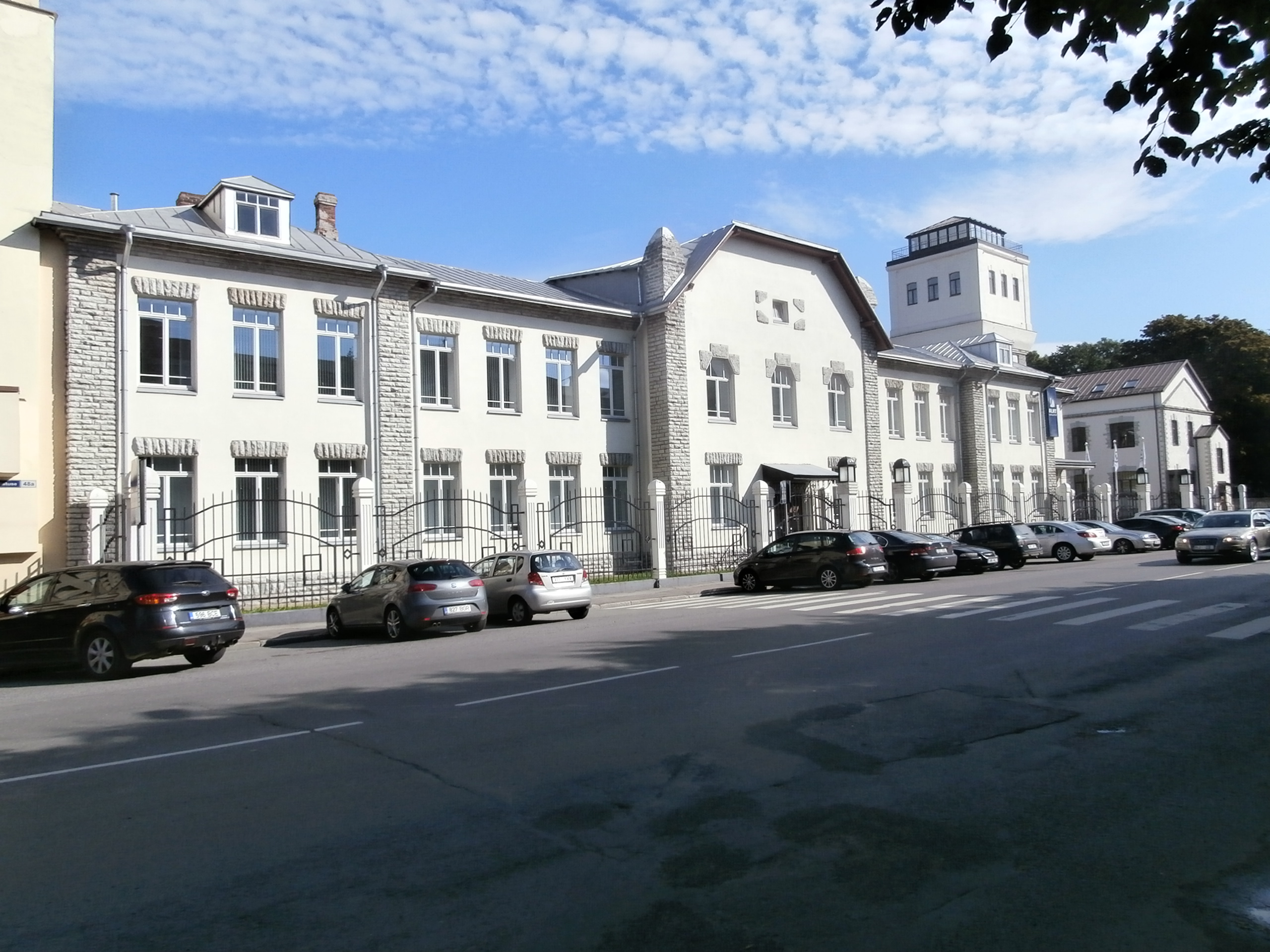
The former administration building, now housing BLRT Grupp

=== Administration building (Tööstuse 48) ===
The two-story building located at Tööstuse 48 served the administrative needs of the Noblessner factories. Designed by architect V. Sakharov and completed in 1914, it features a number of Art Nouveau elements.

=== Shipyard Ship Systems Production Facility (Peetri 12) ===
Noblessner’s Ship Systems Workshop, a typical industrial building for its era, operates today as the KAI art center. Constructed in 1916, the building has a unique convex roof with a small triangular roof lamp running along the ridge that allows natural light into the building. Windows punctuate the building’s façade, covering about half of the surface. While the building retains a number of features from its original construction, since 2019 it has focused on showcasing contemporary art and providing a cultural center for everyone in Noblessner to enjoy.

=== Shipyard and foundry (Tööstuse 48) ===
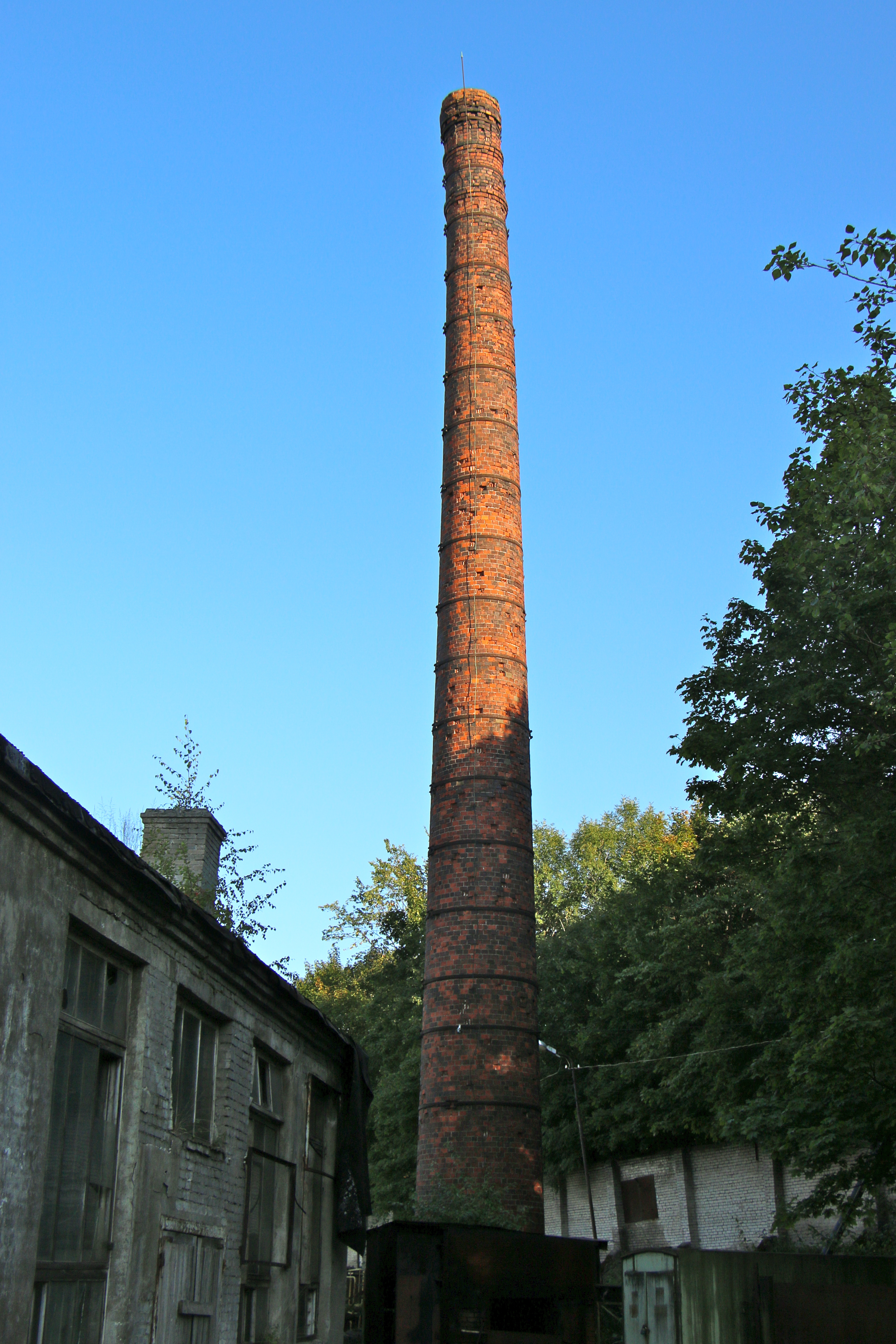
Noblessner Shipyard's foundry chimney, 2014

Engineering company Christiani & Nielsen helped design the Noblessner foundry. The building also included a one-story boiler house half-buried the ground, covered with sheet metal, and bridged with concrete arches. The boilers were heated in a workshop and steam was supplied to the smithy furnaces.

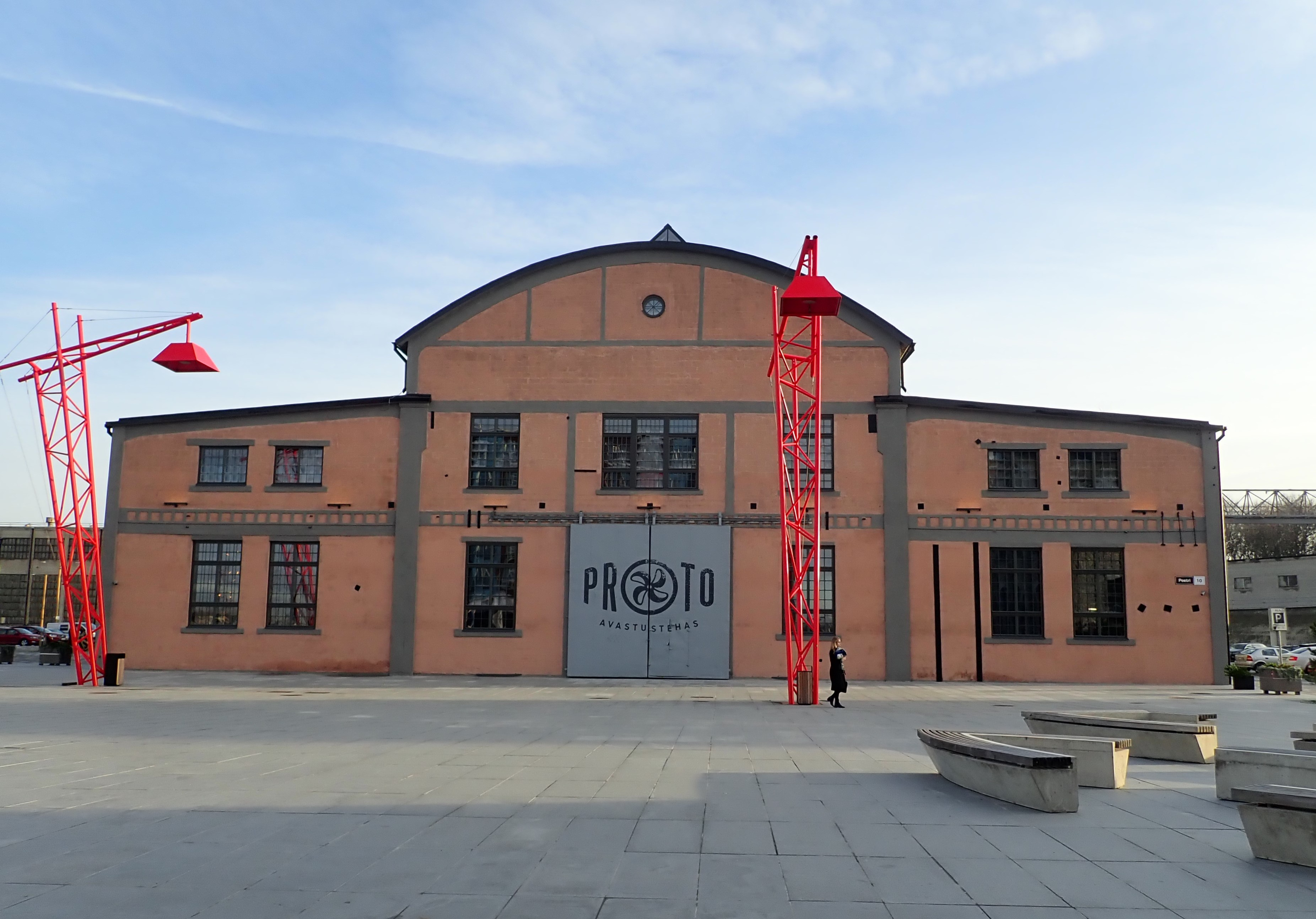
Noblessner foundry 2019

In October 2019, Proto invention factory opened the foundry doors as a family-friendly center where people can explore unique inventions and technological innovations. In addition to exhibits, the good acoustics of the space make it well-suited for a variety of cultural events. Since 2009 there have been different orchestra concerts, some of them conducted by Tõnu Kaljuste, and all of Arvo Pärt’s and Heino Eller’s symphonies have been played there.

=== Shipyard Non-Ferrous Metal Foundry Chimney (Peetri 10) ===
An example of industrial architecture from the beginning of the 20th century, the foundry chimney belongs to the ensemble of factory buildings. The chimney and its plinth are stacked in red bricks and supported by a traction belt and exterior climbing and resting irons. The upper part of the chimney slopes slightly towards the foundry, with an ornamental peak at the top. The chimney was built between 1914 and 1915 along with the foundry building. As with the foundry, engineering company Christiani & Nielsen contributed to the chimney design.

=== Shipyard Assembly Plant (Peetri T2) ===
Architect V. Sakharov designed this building, constructed 1914-1915 as part of the Noblessner submarine factory. The historicist style building has limestone exterior walls and metal truss roof structures. A production building has been built on the north-western façade, and there are two silicate brick building volumes on the south-eastern façade. In 1917, the factory was evacuated and the building was leased to port factories. In the early years of the Republic of Estonia, there was a warehouse here. After that, the building expanded. During the Soviet era, the factory continued to operate. It is currently empty, and in 2007 a new roof was laid on the building.

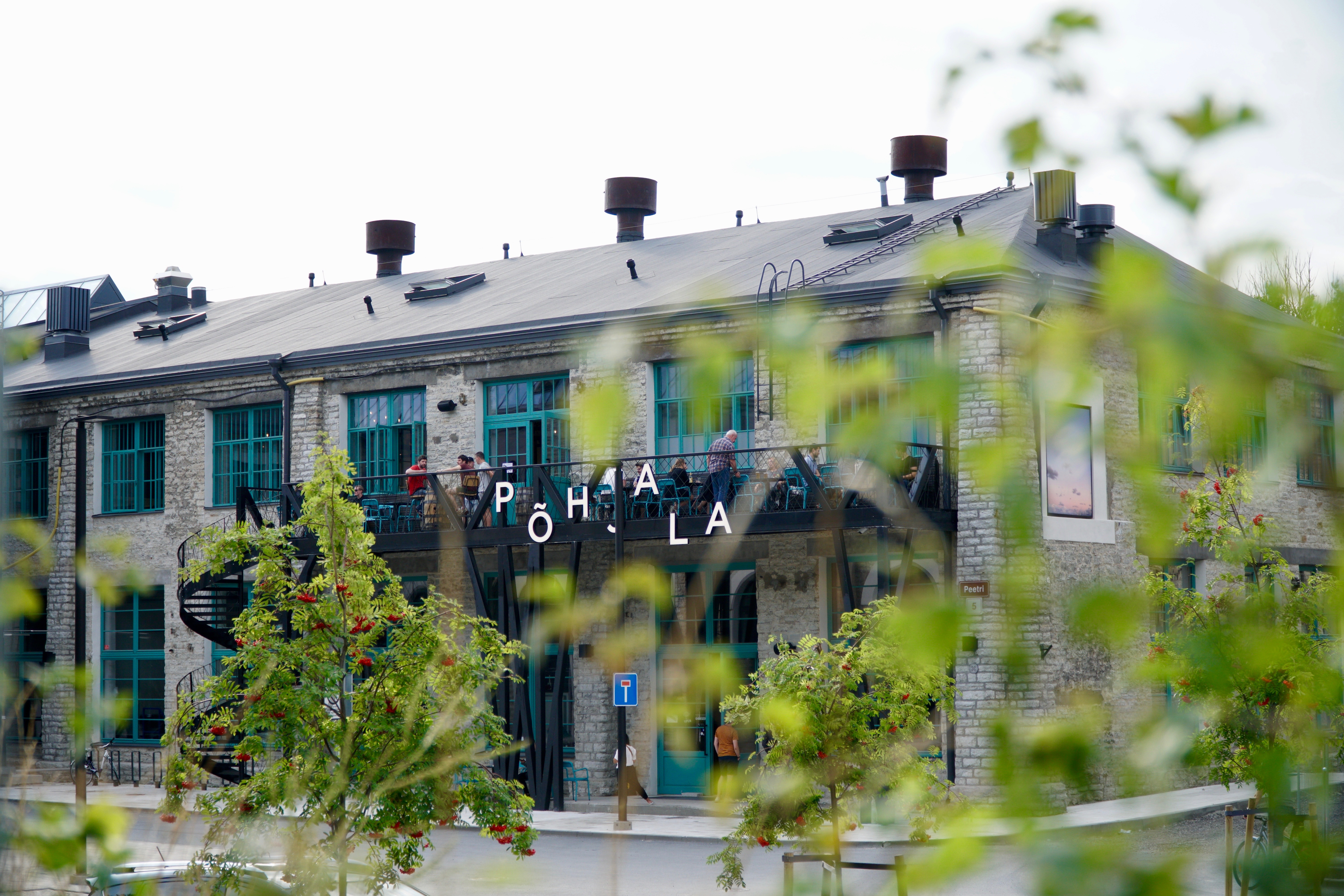
Põhjala Brewery in 2019

=== Help-Repair Shop (Tööstuse 48B/Peetri 5) ===
Constructed along with the rest of the Noblessner factory in 1914-15, this building had the same architect as the Shipyard Assembly Plant, V. Sakharov. It features limestone exterior walls, round windows on the façade, and reinforcements on the sides. In 1917, the factory was evacuated and the building was leased to port factories. From the Soviet era it continued to work. In 2018, the Estonian brewery Põhjala opened its doors in the building as a bar, a restaurant, and also a factory.

=== Warehouse (Peetri 11) ===
On the seafront of the former Noblessner and Peetri Tehas shipyard, near a split railway viaduct, is the factory’s materials warehouse. It is part of the complex of other historic buildings from the same factory. The foundation walls and exterior walls of the historicist-style two-story building are made of solid limestone. No original window frames or exterior doors have been preserved. A light lantern with a metal structure runs on the ridge for almost the entire length of the roof. The interior of the building has a reinforced concrete false ceiling, which is largely bridged by metal beams. The ceiling is supported by metal construction posts. The northern façade of the building features a bronze bas-relief of Adam Johann von Krusenstern (1770-1846). In 2014, the warehouse was renovated into an office building.

=== Railway Viaduct (Peetri T4) ===
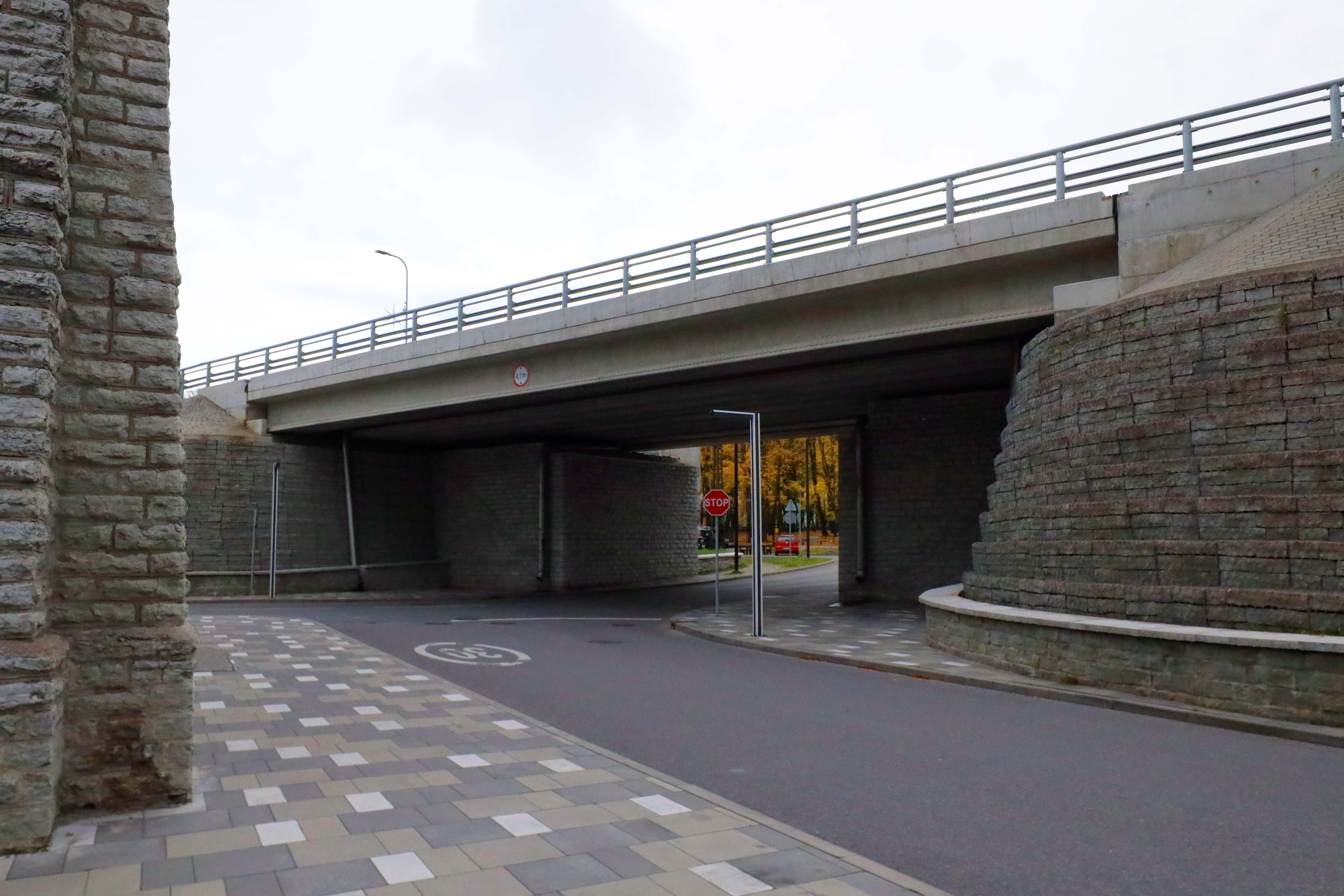
The Noblessner railway viaduct with modern road running underneath.

The railway viaduct is part of the ensemble of the Noblessner shipyard, and a characteristic example of limestone functionalism. The viaduct is on the service route of the port of the Baltic Railway, built in 1870. It is probable that Sakharov, the main architect for Noblessner shipyard, was also involved in the design of the railway viaduct.

Initially, the width of the viaduct was 3.9 m, the width of the opening was 10.2 m, and the height was 5.01 m. Loads receiving the slope were formed by a monolithic concrete cabinet surrounded by limestone masonry. The cement-mortar-based limestone masonry surrounding the sloping columns gave the viaduct an architectural identity. The masonry that has survived to this day is made of limestone, and the cornerstones have a smooth finish. The limestone retaining walls that secured the earthen cones against the sloping masonry have also been preserved.

The Noblessner viaduct, completed in 2015, is built over the slopes of the old viaduct. The new viaduct has a total width of 15 m, it consists of two 3.25 m wide lanes, a 4.5 m wide light traffic road on the south side and a 2 m wide sidewalk on the north side. The earth cones surrounding the old sloping columns have been removed if necessary for the installation of the new structure. The cones have been replaced by convex gradually converging gabions. The rest of the slope surrounding the viaduct is covered with paving stones. At the bottom of the gabions, the old limestone masonry has been preserved.

In 1997, the railway bridge was repaired according to a project prepared in 1994. During this process, the metal structure of the opening building was replaced with a reinforced concrete structure of the same length. At the time of the reconstruction, the railway line was preserved. By 2011, the railway viaduct had been rebuilt into a light traffic bridge as part of the Culture Kilometer. In 2012, the design of Kalaranna Street was started, in 2015, the Noblessner viaduct was completed.

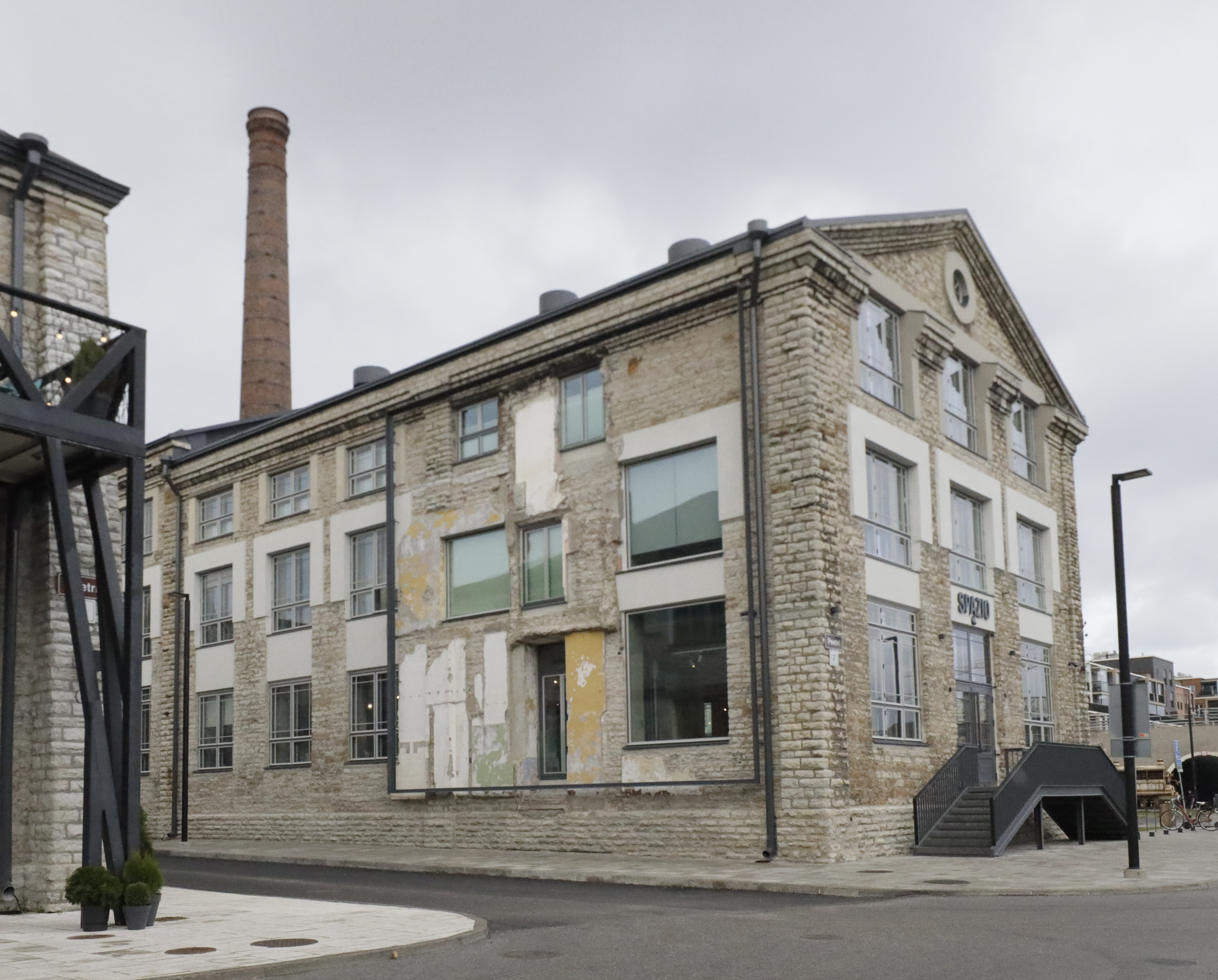
The Noblessner power plant with its chimney in the background

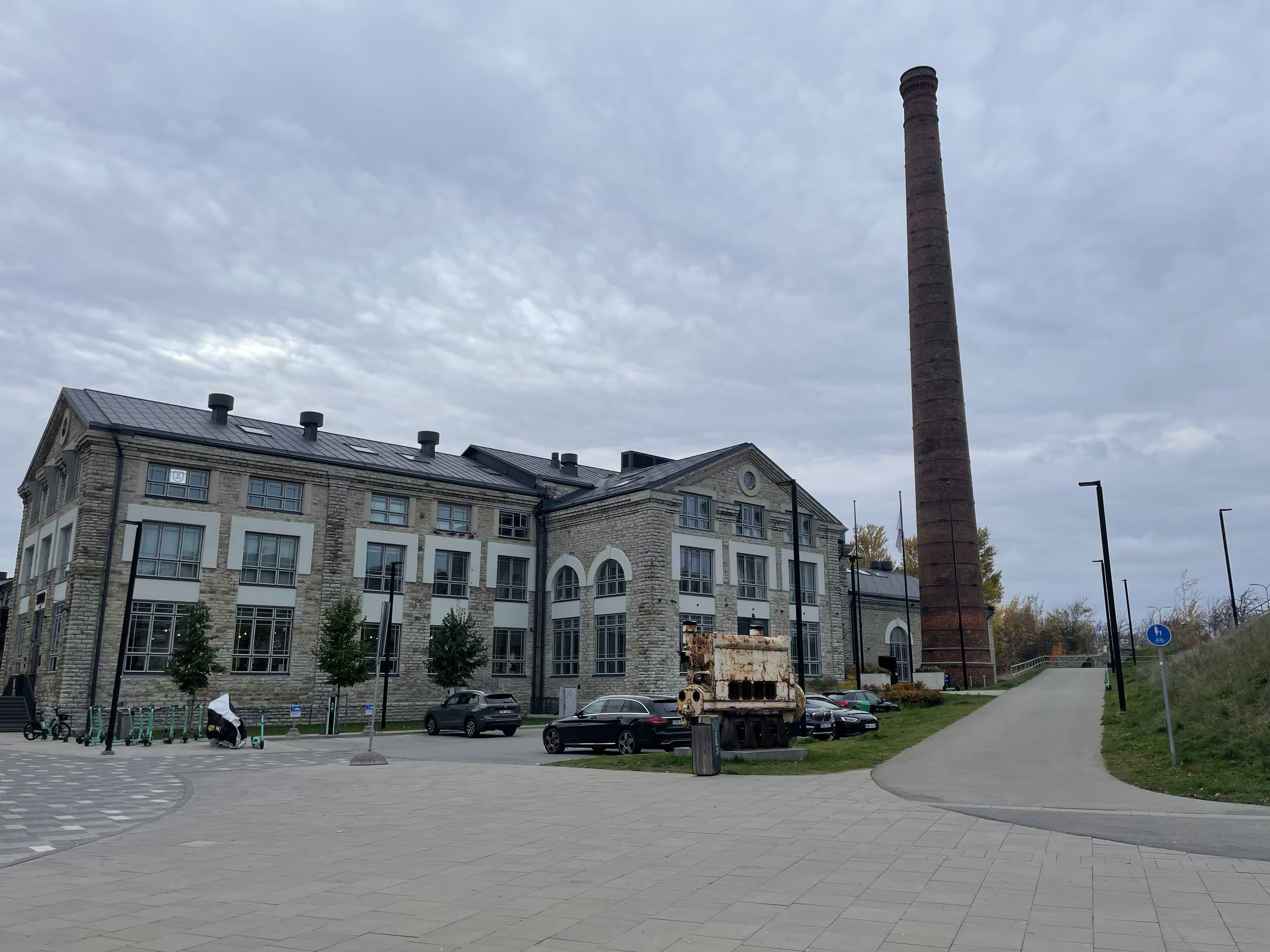
The former Noblessner power plant, front view

=== Power Plant with Chimney (Peetri 7) ===
The power plant was built in 1914-1915. It is a historic-style three-story building with limestone exterior walls. The facades have large rectangular windows with reinforced concrete pavements, the southwest facade has the original high arched windows. There is also a silicate brick staircase and a gallery that connects to the outbuilding. Near the northern corner of the building rises a red brick chimney with an ornamented top. The building was designed by architect V. Sakharov. In 1917, the factory was evacuated and the building was leased to port factories. In Soviet times, it was partly made a canteen.

=== Water Tower and Residential Building (Tööstuse 46) ===
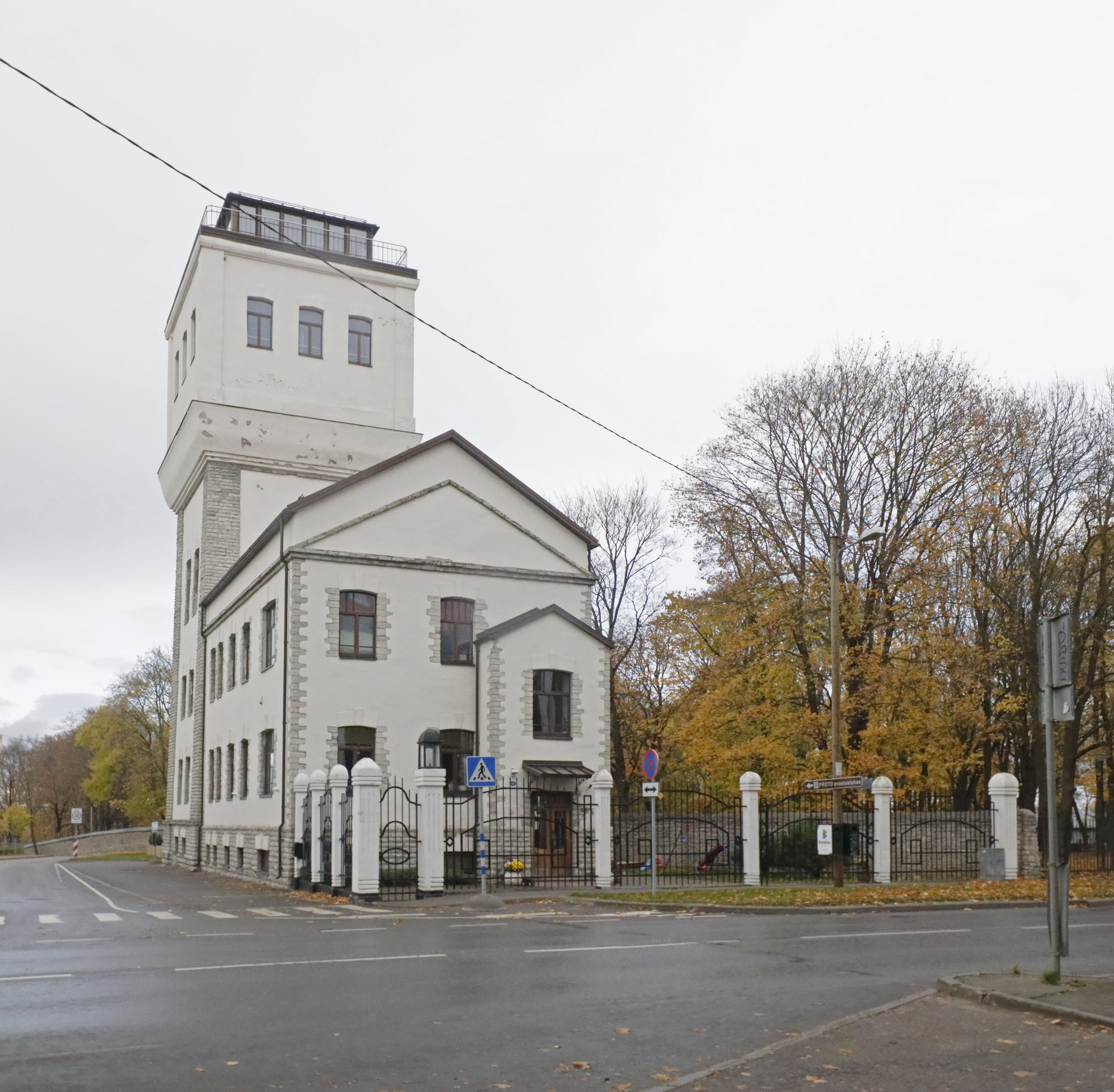
The water tower of Noblessner

The building consists of a two-story residential building with a gable roof on the street side and an initially three-story water tower with a volume floor added during the Soviet era.

In 1913, when a submarine factory was planned on this plot, administrators envisaged cooperation of the new plant with the older "Volta" plant across the road. The factory buildings were completed in 1914-1915, and the name of the architect or chief engineer is unknown. In 1917, a large portion of the internal equipment was sent to Russia. During the Republic of Estonia era, the “Noblessner” plot was used by small industries. During the Soviet occupation, the factory was the Tallinn Naval Factory of the USSR Navy. In the 1960s and 1970s, a cubic addition was built on the water tower-residential tower. After the independence of Estonia, the plot of the factory was taken over by AS Tallinna Meretehas, which went bankrupt in 2001. A creative city is now planned for the plot, and the water tower-residential building has been restored.

=== Modern Residential Buildings (Staapli 3, Staapli 12 and Peetri 11) ===
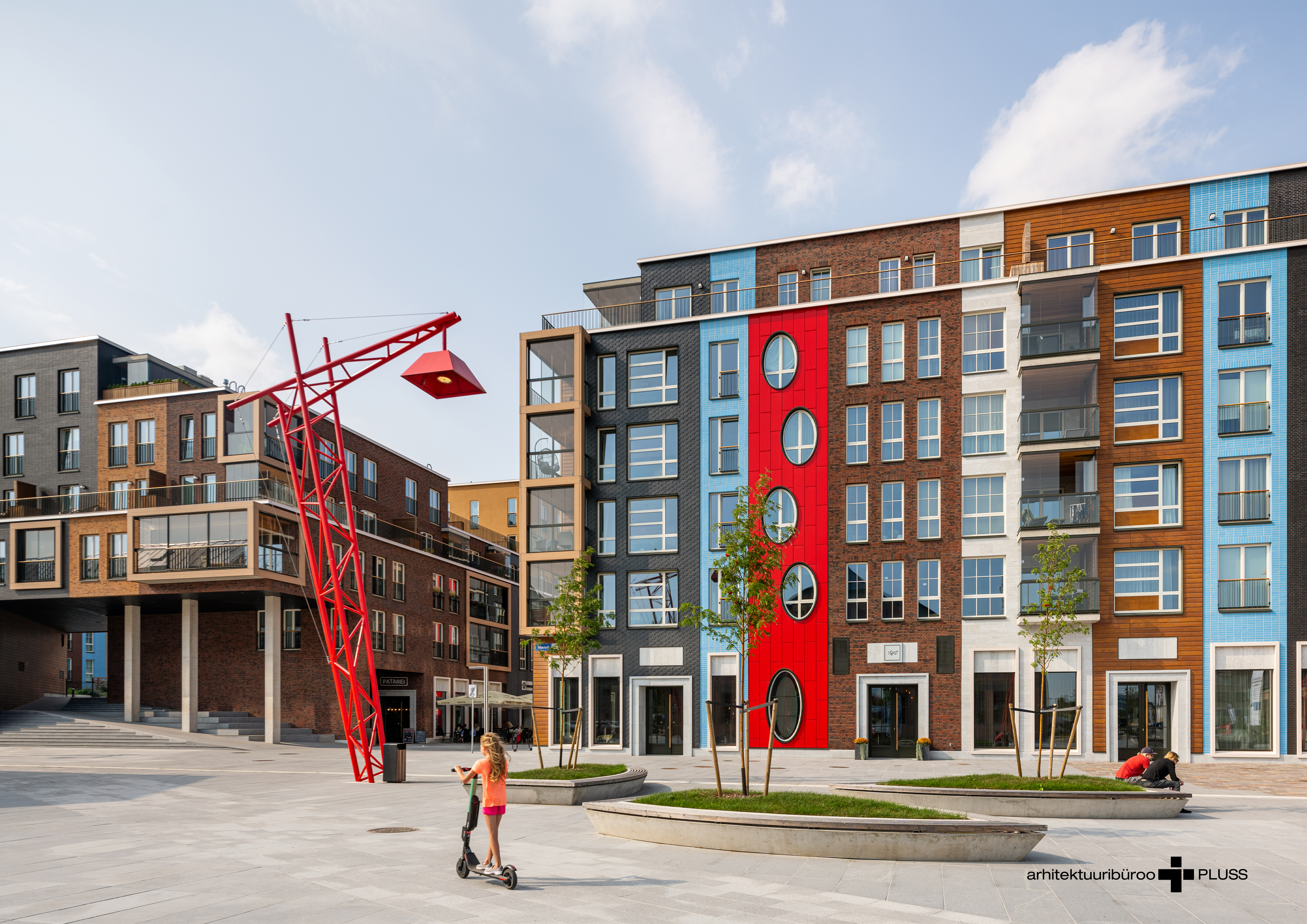
Modern buildings in Noblessner, Staapli 3, PLUSS Architects

The modern real estate buildings were built in 2017-2018 by PLUSS architects. The project developers were BLRT Grupp in cooperation with Merko Ehitus; some of the projects are still in process, like Vesilennuki. These residential and commercial buildings are the nearest ones to the sea in Estonia.

== See also ==
- Seaplane Harbour - a maritime museum in Noblessner
- Põhjala Brewery - a craft brewery and taproom in Noblessner
