= Nobel & Lessner =

Shipbuilding company of Imperial Russia

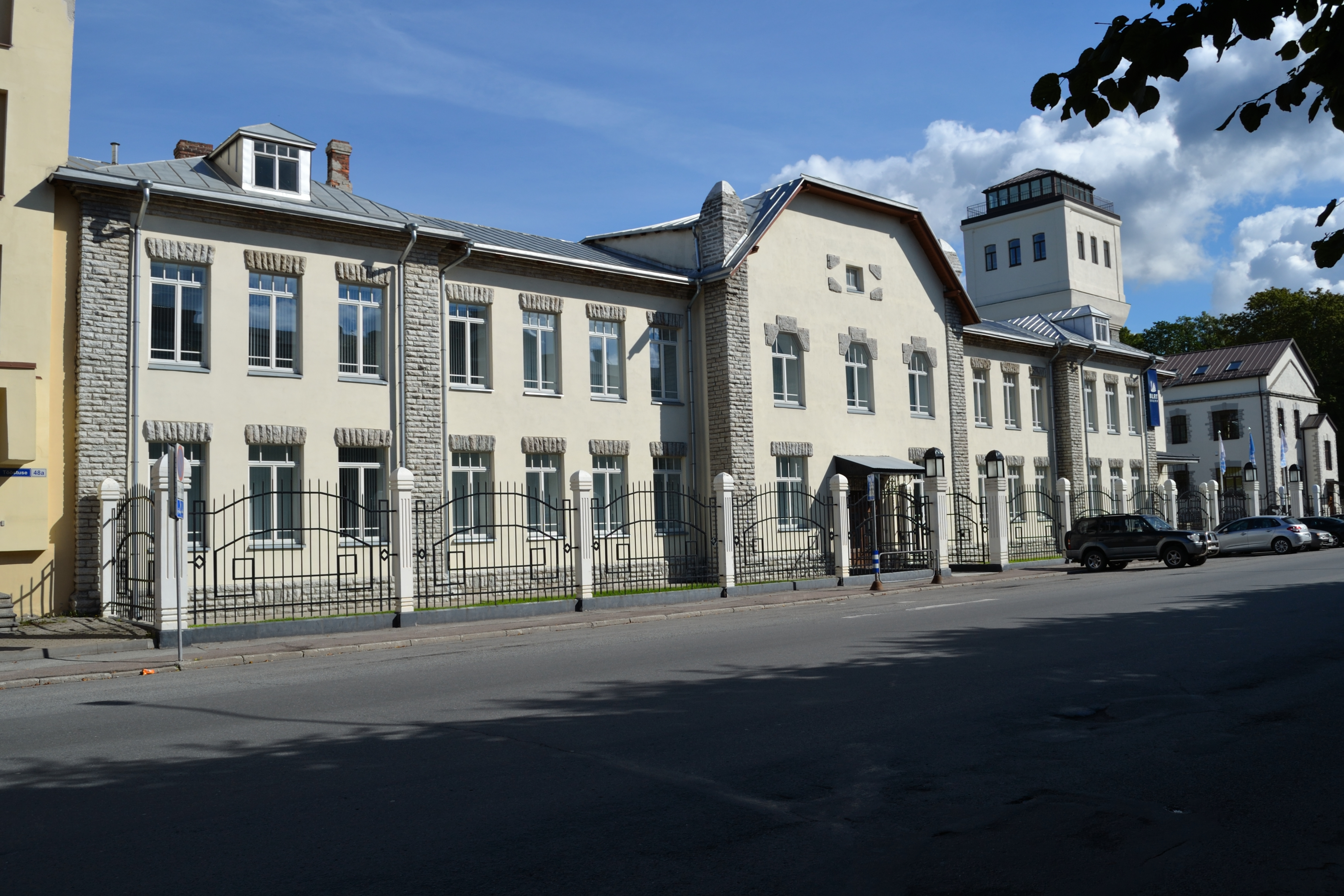
- Founded: 1912

The Nobel & Lessner Company was formed in 1912 by the merger of Ludwig Nobel Works and G. A. Lessner Works to build submarines for the Imperial Russian Navy. Ludwig Nobel specialized in diesel engines and Lessner had built a very small experimental submarine (Keta) in 1905. The engine plant remained in Saint Petersburg, but a new shipyard was built in Reval, Estonia in 1913–1914. The hulls of first three submarines contracted for were built by the Admiralty Works and moved to Reval while the new shipyard was under construction. Five submarines were built in 1915–1916 before construction was disrupted by the February Revolution of 1917. The company was renamed as Petrograd Shipyard (Petrovskaya Verf) in 1916.

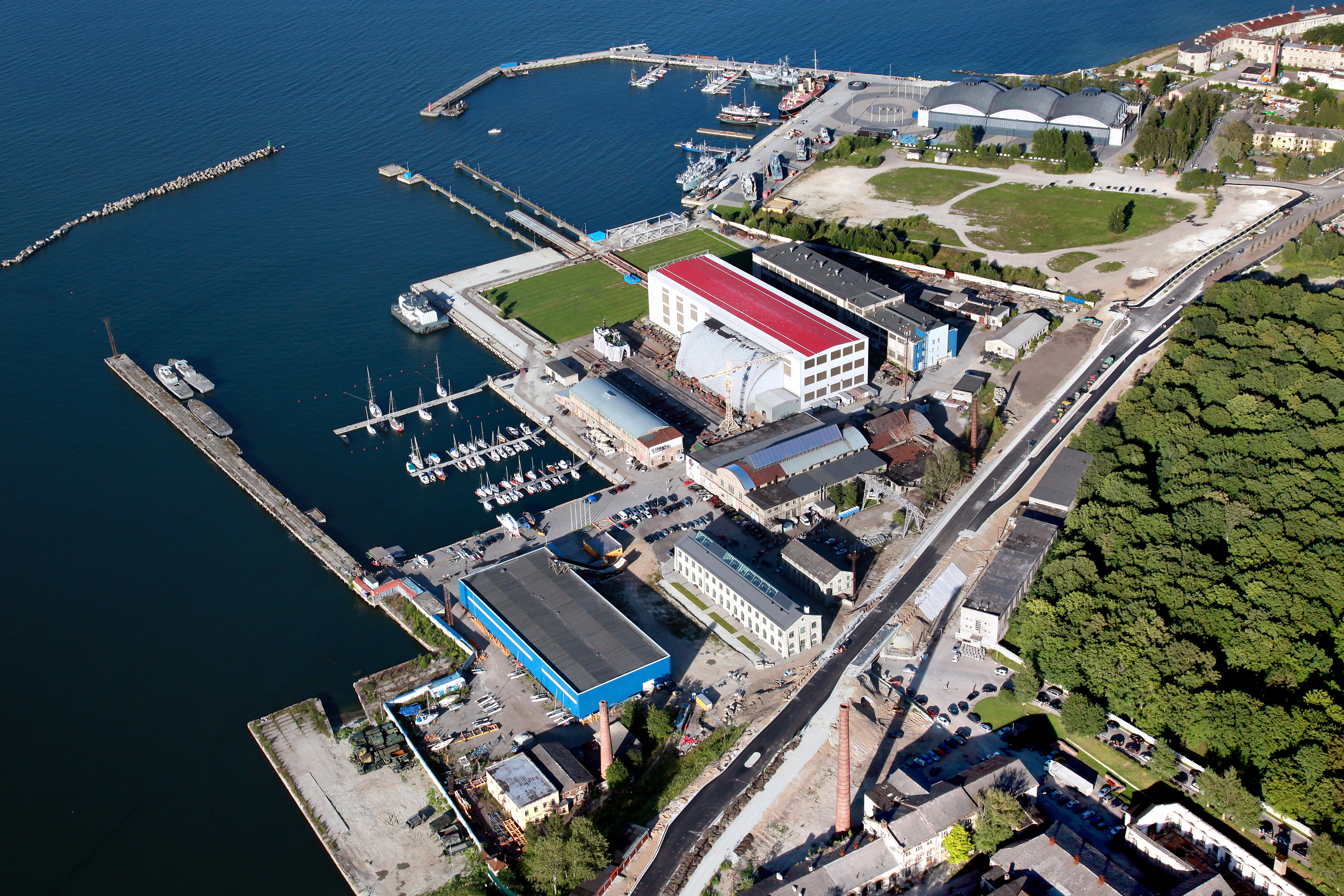

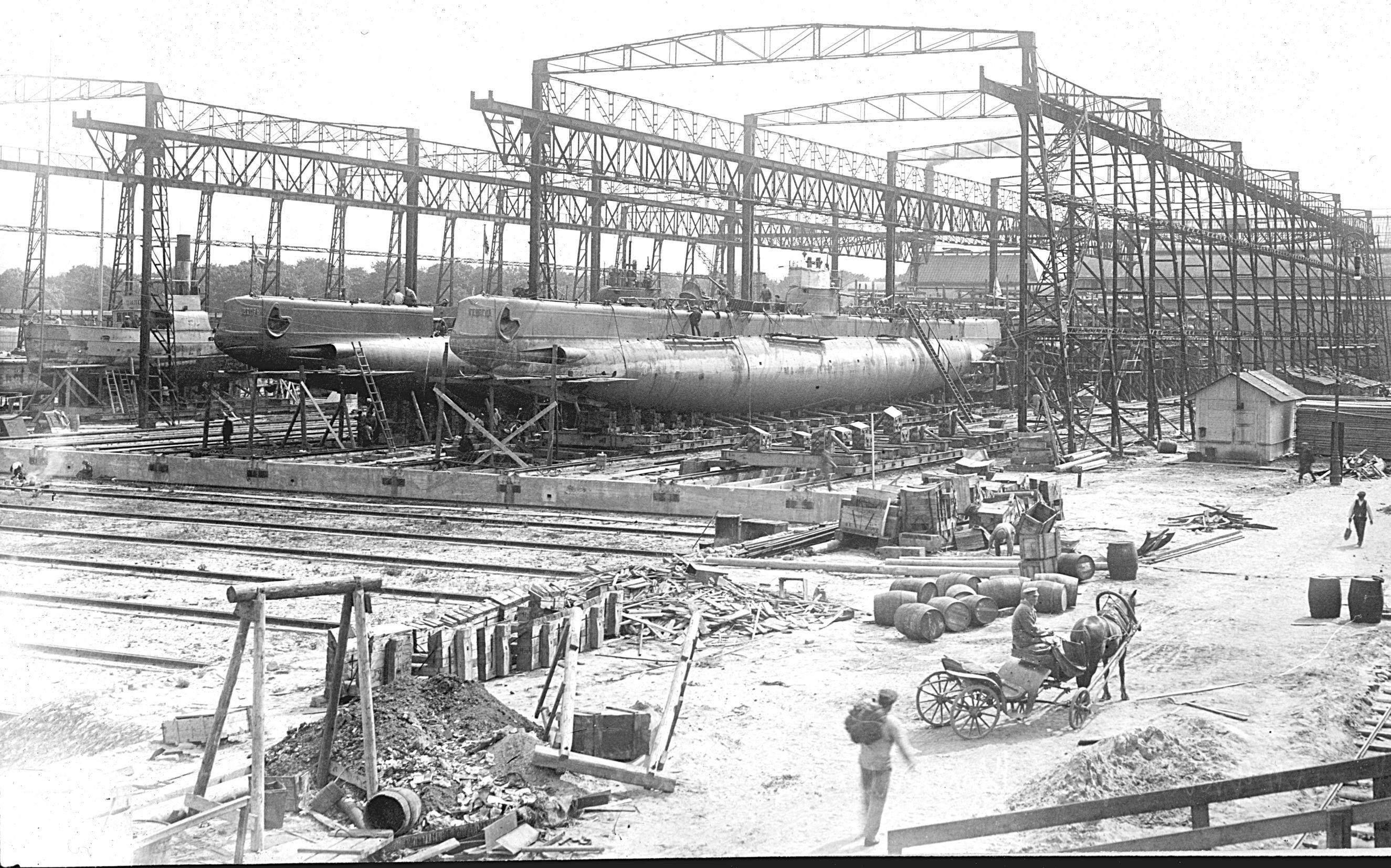
Imperial Russian submarines Gepard and Vepr during refitting of external torpedo hatches at Noblessner shipyard, circa 1915–1916

== Bibliography ==
- de Saint Hubert, Christian & Drashpil, Boris V. (1985). "Main Shipyards, Enginebuilders and Manufacturers of Guns and Armour Plate in the Saint Petersburg Area Up to 1917". Warship International. XXII (4). International Naval Research Organization: 333–60. ISSN 0043-0374.

== See also ==
- Noblessner
