= Russian ship naming conventions =

The Russian and Soviet Navy's ship naming conventions were similar to those of other nations. A problem for the non-Russian reader is the need to transliterate the Cyrillic names into the Latin alphabet. There are often several different Latin spellings of the same Russian name.

== Pre revolution ==
Before the revolution, the Imperial Russian Navy used the following convention:

=== Battleships ===
Russian Battleships were named after:

- Battles – e.g., Gangut, Petropavlovsk, Poltava, Sinop, Chesma, Borodino
- Royals – e.g., Imperator Pavel I (Emperor Paul I), Pyotr Veliky (Peter the Great), Tsesarevich
- Saints – e.g., Georgy Pobedonosets (St George the Victorious), Andrey Pervozvanny (St Andrew the First-called), Tri Svyatitely (Three Holy Hierarchs)
- Generals – e.g., Knyaz Suvorov (Prince Suvorov), Knyaz Potemkin Tavricheskii (Prince Potemkin of Taurica)
- Traditional – e.g., Retvizan (after Rättvisan, Swedish ship-of-the-line captured by Russians in 1790)

=== Cruisers ===
Russian Cruisers were named after:

- Mythical figures – e.g., Rurik, Askold, Bayan
- Admirals – e.g., Admiral Makarov, Admiral Lazarev
- Gemstones – e.g., Zhemchug = pearl

=== Destroyers ===
Russian destroyers were named after adjectives: e.g. Burnyi = Stormy, Smeliy = Valiant

=== Frigates/Gunboats ===
- Named after birds or animals – e.g., Albatross
- Ethnographic names – e.g., Donskoy Kasak = Don Cossack

=== Submarines ===
Named after fish or animals – e.g., Morzh = Walrus, Akula = Shark

== Soviet times ==
=== Renaming ===
The Soviets changed the names of many ships after they took power in 1917.

- Royal names were changed to republican names, e.g., Volya=Free Will, Grazhdanin = Citizen
- The Gangut Class dreadnoughts were named after Revolutionary themes, but two reverted to original names during World War II
- Cruisers were renamed after Communist themes, e.g., Chervona Ukraina = Red Ukraine
- Many destroyers were renamed after Political figures e.g. Karl Liebknecht

=== New construction ===
- Planned Battleships were named after Soviet themes, e.g., Sovetsky Soyuz
- Cruisers were named after revolutionary heroes, e.g., Kirov
- Destroyer leaders were named after cities, e.g. Moskva = Moscow
- Destroyers reverted to being named after adjectives, e.g., Grozny = Formidable
- Frigates/Gunboats were named after animals, or weather phenomena, e.g., Uragan = hurricane
- Submarines were initially given political names (e.g. Dekabrist), or fish names but later given only numbers

=== Post War ===
- Aircraft carriers and helicopter cruisers were named after cities, Tbilisi and Baku were changed to Admiral Kuznetsov and Admiral Gorshkov respectively on the collapse of the Soviet Union
- Battle cruisers were named after revolutionary heroes, this was changed to admirals after the end of communism
- Cruisers were mostly named after admirals, generals, cities or given traditional names e.g. Slava=glory
- Destroyers and large frigates were named after adjectives, although a few were named after the Komsomol
- Frigates were named after birds or animals e.g. Lev=Lion
- Submarines were rarely named during Soviet times but after the end of the Soviet Union many were renamed after animals, e.g., Yaguar, or cities, e.g., Kursk. New nuclear submarines are called after historical figures like Vladimir Monomakh.

=== Project(design) designations (design names) ===
The Soviets assigned a project number to each new design. The numbers were non sequential, submarine designs had numbers 600-900, small combatants 100-200 and large ships 1000 plus. The designs also had covernames, major ship classes were named after birds, e.g., Orlan = Sea eagle, Berkut = Golden eagle, Krechyet = Gyrfalcon. Submarine designs were given fish names, e.g., Akula = Shark, Som = Catfish, etc.

- see List of ships of Russia by project number for more details

== NATO naming ==
Also see NATO reporting name

NATO assigned its own reporting names to Soviet ships. This was because the official Soviet designation was unknown.

- Initially surface ship classes were named after the place where they were first identified, e.g. Kotlin, Poti etc. It soon became apparent that this convention would rapidly become obsolete as the Soviet Union had only a limited number of naval bases and shipyards. A new convention based on vaguely Slavic sounding names beginning with the letter K for "korabl" ("warship" in Russian naval usage) was then used.
- Fast patrol and torpedo craft classes were named after the Russian name for insects e.g. Osa=wasp. The Soviets also actually named their missile boats after insects leading to confusion.
- Minesweepers and small frigates were given diminutive first names e.g. Alyosha, Vanya, Petya
- Hovercraft were named after Russian words for birds e.g. Aist = Stork
- Submarine classes were given Phonetic alphabet names e.g. Delta, Alfa, Victor etc. When the letters of the Phonetic alphabet had all been assigned, Russian words, primarily for fish, were used. As with missile boats, this led to confusion as the same Russian word could be both the official Soviet designation of one submarine class and the NATO reporting name of a different one. For example, Akula (shark) was both the NATO reporting name for an attack submarine and the Soviet designation of a ballistic missile submarine.
