= Bars-class submarine (1915) =

Class of submarines

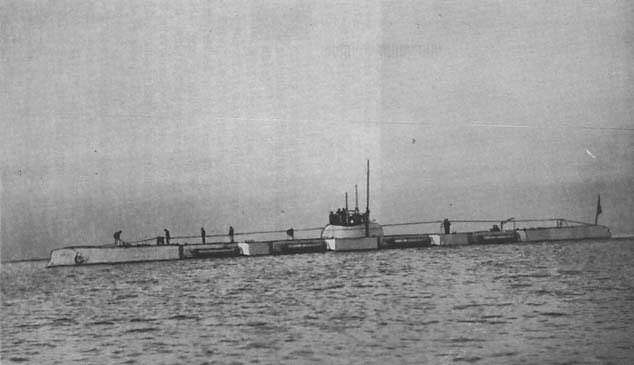
- Bars in 1914

Class overview
- Name: Bars class
- Operators: Imperial Russian Navy; Imperial German Navy (captured); Soviet Navy
- Preceded by: Morzh class
- Succeeded by: Dekabrist class
- In commission: 1914–1941
- Completed: 24
- Lost: 9

General characteristics
- Type: Submarine
- Displacement: 650 tons surfaced; 780 tons submerged
- Length: 223 ft (68 m)
- Beam: 15 ft (4.6 m)
- Draft: 13 ft (4.0 m)
- Propulsion: Diesel-electric; 2,640 hp diesel; 900 hp electric (as designed); 2 shafts
- Speed: 18 knots (33 km/h) surfaced; 9 knots (17 km/h) submerged
- Range: 400 nmi (740 km)
- Complement: 33
- Armament: 1 × 63 mm (2.5 in) (as designed); 1 × 37 mm (1.5 in) AA gun; 4 × 457 mm (18.0 in) torpedo tubes; 8 × torpedoes in drop collars (later removed)

The Bars class were a group of submarines built for the Imperial Russian Navy during World War I. A total of 24 boats were built between 1914 and 1917. A number of them saw action during the First World War, and three were lost in the conflict. The surviving boats were taken over by the Soviets after the Bolshevik Revolution and a number of them remained in service until the 1930s.

== Design ==
The Bars-class submarines were ordered by the Imperial Russian Navy under their 1912 construction programme. 24 boats were ordered; 12 for the Baltic Fleet, six for the Black Sea, and six for the Siberian flotilla. The Baltic Fleet units were built at the Baltic Yard, St. Petersburg, and the Noblessner Yard, Reval (now Tallinn). The Black Sea units were built at Nikolayev, at the Baltic and the Naval Yards. The Siberian units were also built in the Baltic, but the outbreak of the First World War made their transfer impossible, and they were reassigned to the Baltic Fleet in 1915.

These boats were designed by Ivan Bubnov and based on the preceding Morzh class. They were single-hulled, but like the Morzh boats lacked internal bulkheads. The Morzh design was enlarged with more powerful engines, a larger torpedo armament, and larger guns.

As designed the boats were to have two 900 horsepower (670 kW) electric and two 2,640 bhp (1,970 kW) diesel engines, but a shortage of these diesels meant the boats had a variety of machinery fitted. Only Kuguar and Zmeya had the diesels originally intended for them. This and greater than expected hull resistance left them with lower than intended underwater speeds.

The gun armament too was problematic; the intended armament was one 63-millimetre (2.5 in) and one 37 mm (1.5 in) gun, but this too, varied according to availability. Three units (Bars, Vepr, and Volk) carried two 63 mm guns, while four others had an additional 75 mm gun. The Black Sea boats had one 75 mm and one 37 mm gun.

The torpedo armament comprised four internal 18-inch (460 mm) torpedo tubes and eight external torpedoes in drop collars mounted in recessed niches low in the hull. Trials with Bars and Vepr showed these to be unsuitable and subsequent vessels had the niches and drop-collars moved to the upper deck; Bars and Vepr were later refitted to this pattern, before their ultimate complete removal.

The design had numerous shortcomings, including a lack of internal bulkheads and a slow diving time. Surviving boats were modernized after the Russian Civil War by installing bulkheads, new diesels, pumps and extra torpedo tubes (the external drop collars were removed).

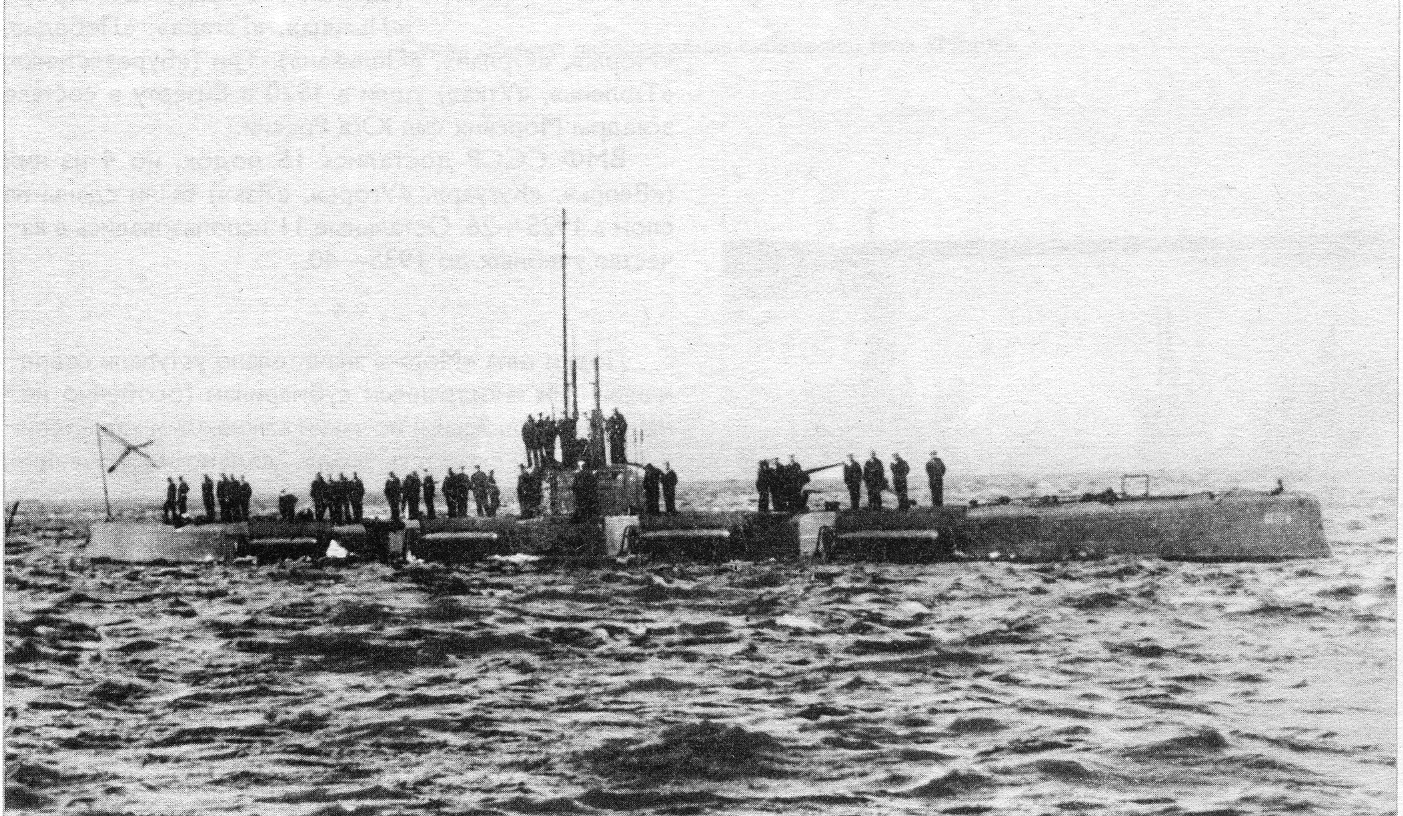
Vepr, showing the original low mounting of the external torpedoes

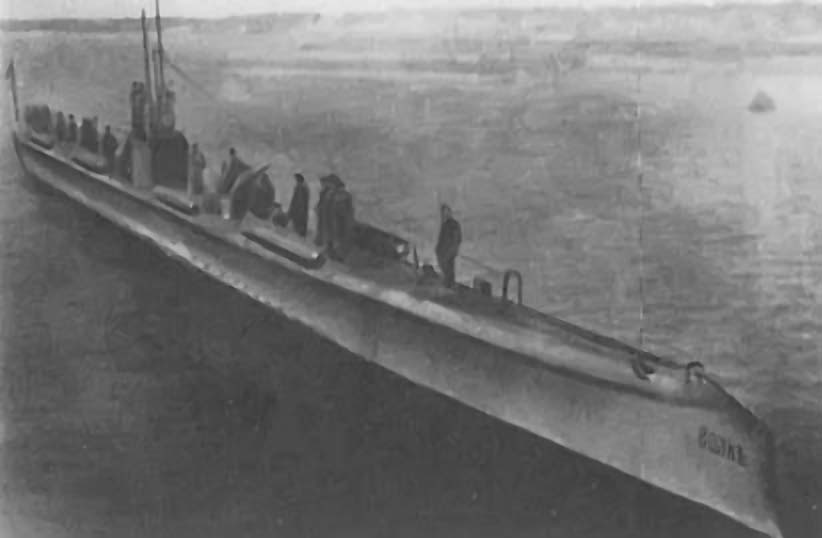
Volk in 1916 showing the re-positioned external torpedo mountings

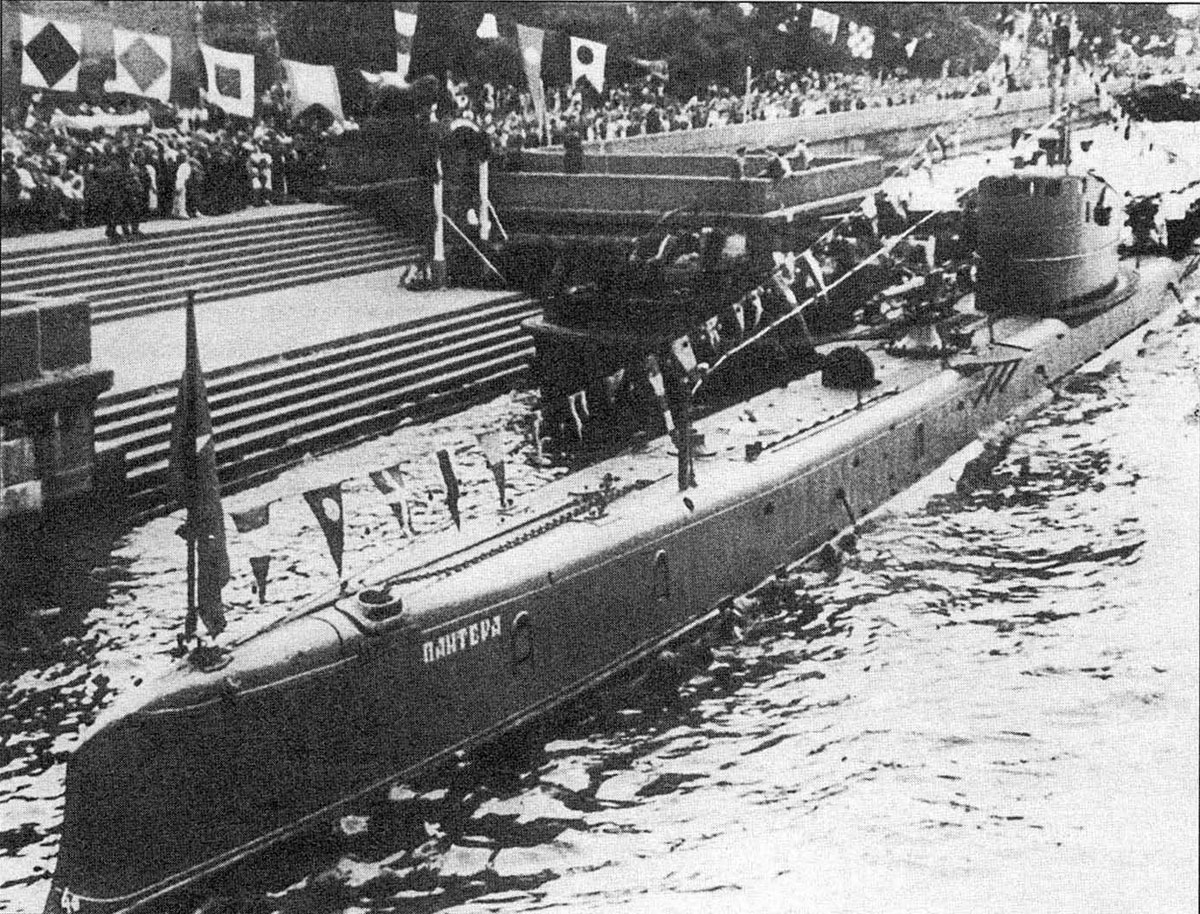
Pantera in 1916–1917 with external torpedoes removed

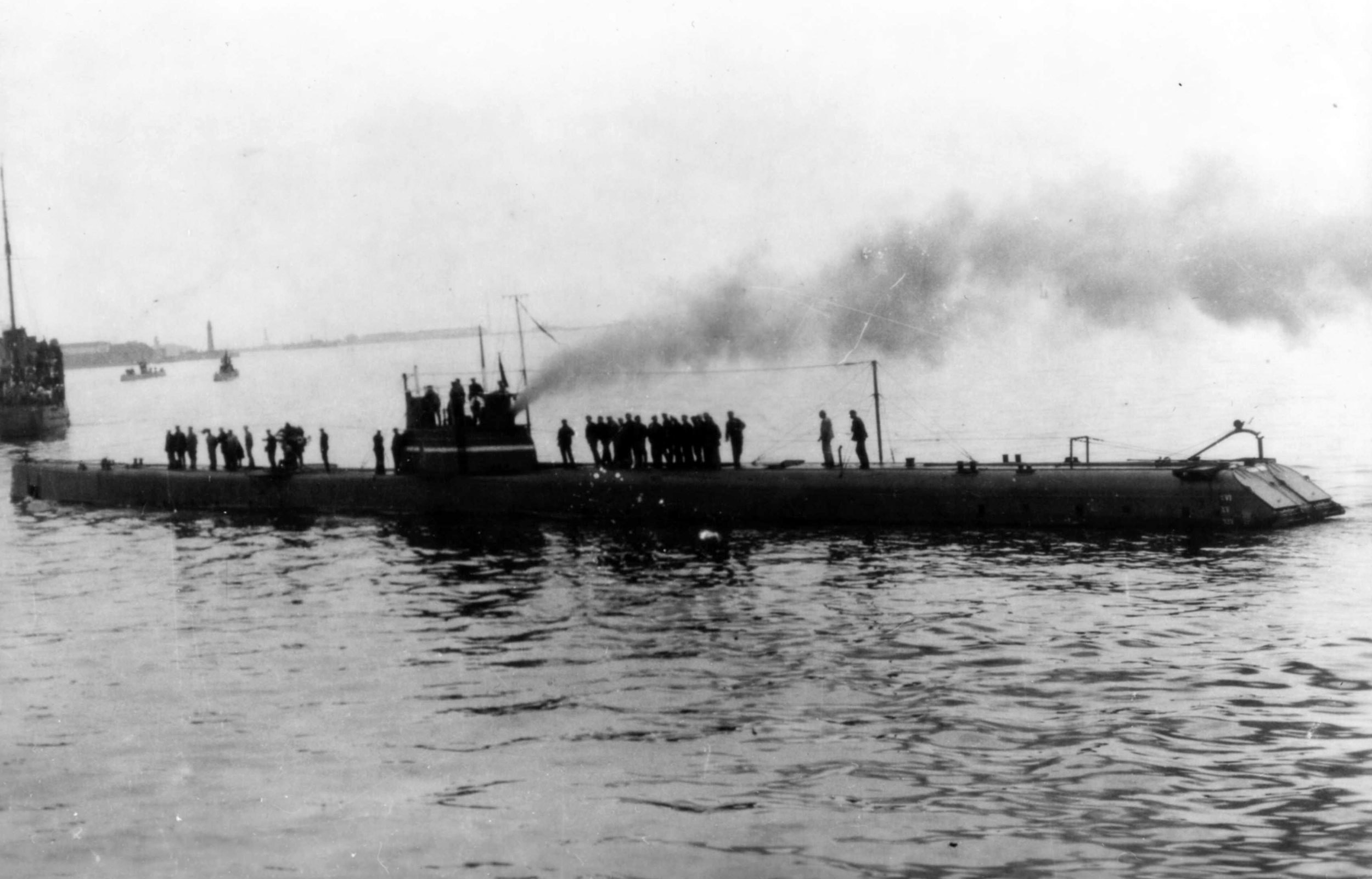
Ersh, showing minelaying tubes at stern

== Service history ==
The Baltic Fleet units saw action during the First World War and made numerous war patrols in the Baltic, despite being limited by the short operating season. In the 1915 ice-free season they targeted German warships but with little success, these being generally fast and well-protected. In the 1916 and 1917 seasons they were employed attacking German iron-ore shipments along the Swedish coast, though again with little success, due to the restrictions imposed by Swedish neutrality.

Three vessels (Bars, Lvitsa and Gepard) were lost in action. Two (Edinorog and Ugor) were lost in marine accidents and two (Forel and Yaz)were left unfinished. Another two (Kuguar and Vepr) were designated as training units. With the onset of the Bolshevik Revolution and the start of the Russian Civil War the surviving units in the Baltic were taken over by the Soviets and saw some action against Allied Intervention forces; in 1919 Pantera sank the British destroyer Vittoria.

The Black Sea units were unfinished during World War I and were seized by the German occupation forces before being surrendered to the Allies and the White Russian forces of General Wrangel. With the end of the Civil War the surviving Bars-class vessels remained in service until the 1930s before being discarded.

== Ships ==
Baltic Fleet
Ship	Namesake	Builder	Launch date	Service/Fate
Bars; БАРС	(Leopard)	Baltic Shipyard, St. Petersburg	2 June 1915	Lost May 1917; cause unknown
Gepard; ГЕПАРД	(Cheetah)	Baltic Shipyard, St. Petersburg	2 June 1915	Sunk 28 October 1917
Kuguar; КУГУАР	(Cougar)	Noblessner Yard, Reval	1916	Hulked 1922
Leopard; ЛЕОПАРД	(Leopard)	Noblessner Yard, Reval	1916	Renamed Krasnoarmeets. Hulked 1936
Lvitsa; ЛЬВИЦА	(Lioness)	Noblessner Yard, Reval	23 October 1915	Sunk 11 June 1917
Pantera; ПАНТЕРА	(Panther)	Noblessner Yard, Reval	26 April 1916	Sank British destroyer HMS Vittoria off the island of Seiskari during the British Intervention in Russia. Aksel Berg was navigating officer at the time. The ship was renamed Komissar and converted to a harbour training ship 1941
Rys; РЫСЬ	(Lynx)	Noblessner Yard, Reval	1916	Renamed Bolshevik, sunk in an accident 13 September 1935
Tigr; ТИГР	(Tiger)	Noblessner Yard, Reval	18 September 1915	Renamed Kommunar, broken up 1936
Tur; ТУР	(Aurochs)	Noblessner Yard, Reval	1916	Renamed Tovarich, stricken in 1936
Vepr; ВЕПРЬ	(Wild Boar)	Baltic Shipyard, St. Petersburg	1915	Hulked 1922
Volk; ВОЛК	(Wolf)	Baltic Shipyard, St. Petersburg	1915	Stricken 1936
Yaguar; ЯГУАР	(Jaguar)	Noblessner Yard, Reval	1916	Renamed Krasnoflotets. Stricken 1936

Black Sea Fleet
Ship	Namesake	Builder	Launch Date	Service/Fate
Burevestnik; БУРЕВЕСТНИК	(Petrel)	Naval Yard, Nikolayev	1916	Seized by the Germans as SM US-1 and transferred to the White Russian forces in 1918, interned in Bizerte with Wrangel's fleet and scrapped 1924
Gagara; ГАГАРА	(Loon/Diver)	Baltic (Admiralty) Yard, Nikolayev	7 October 1916	Seized by the Germans as US 4 and scuttled 26 April 1919
Lebed; ЛЕБЕДЬ	(Swan)	Naval Yard, Nikolayev	1917	Seized by the Germans and scuttled 26 April 1919
Orlan; ОРЛАН	(Sea eagle)	Naval Yard, Nikolayev	1916	Seized by the Germans as US 2 and scuttled 26 April 1919
Pelikan; ПЕЛИКАН	(Pelican)	Naval Yard, Nikolayev	September 1917	Seized by the Germans and scuttled 26 April 1919
Utka; УТКА	(Duck)	Baltic (Admiralty) Yard, Nikolayev	1916	Seized by the Germans as US 3 and transferred to the White Russian forces in 1918, interned in Bizerte and scrapped 1924

Siberian Flotilla (served at Baltic Fleet)
Ship	Namesake	Builder	Launch Date	Service/Fate
Edinorog; ЕДИНОРОГ	(Unicorn)	Baltic Shipyard, St. Petersburg	1916	Sunk 25 February 1918. Wreck found on 28 May 2009 by the Estonian Maritime Museum in the northern part of the Gulf of Finland.
Zmeya; ЗМЕЯ	(Serpent)	Baltic Shipyard, St. Petersburg	1916	Renamed Proletariy, sunk in an accident 22 May 1931
Ugor; УГОРЬ	(Eel)	Baltic Shipyard, St. Petersburg	1916	Sunk 27 March 1920
Yaz; ЯЗЬ	(Ide/Orfe)	Noblessner Yard, Reval	1917?	Never commissioned. Used by Kommuna for training purposes. Stricken 1922
Erzh; ЕРШ	(Ruffe)	Baltic Shipyard, St. Petersburg	1917?	Converted to minelayer Sunk in an accident 22 May 1931
Forel; ФОРЕЛЬ	(Trout)	Baltic Shipyard, St. Petersburg	1916	Converted to minelayer Stricken 1922
