= Rubin Design Bureau =

Russian submarine designer

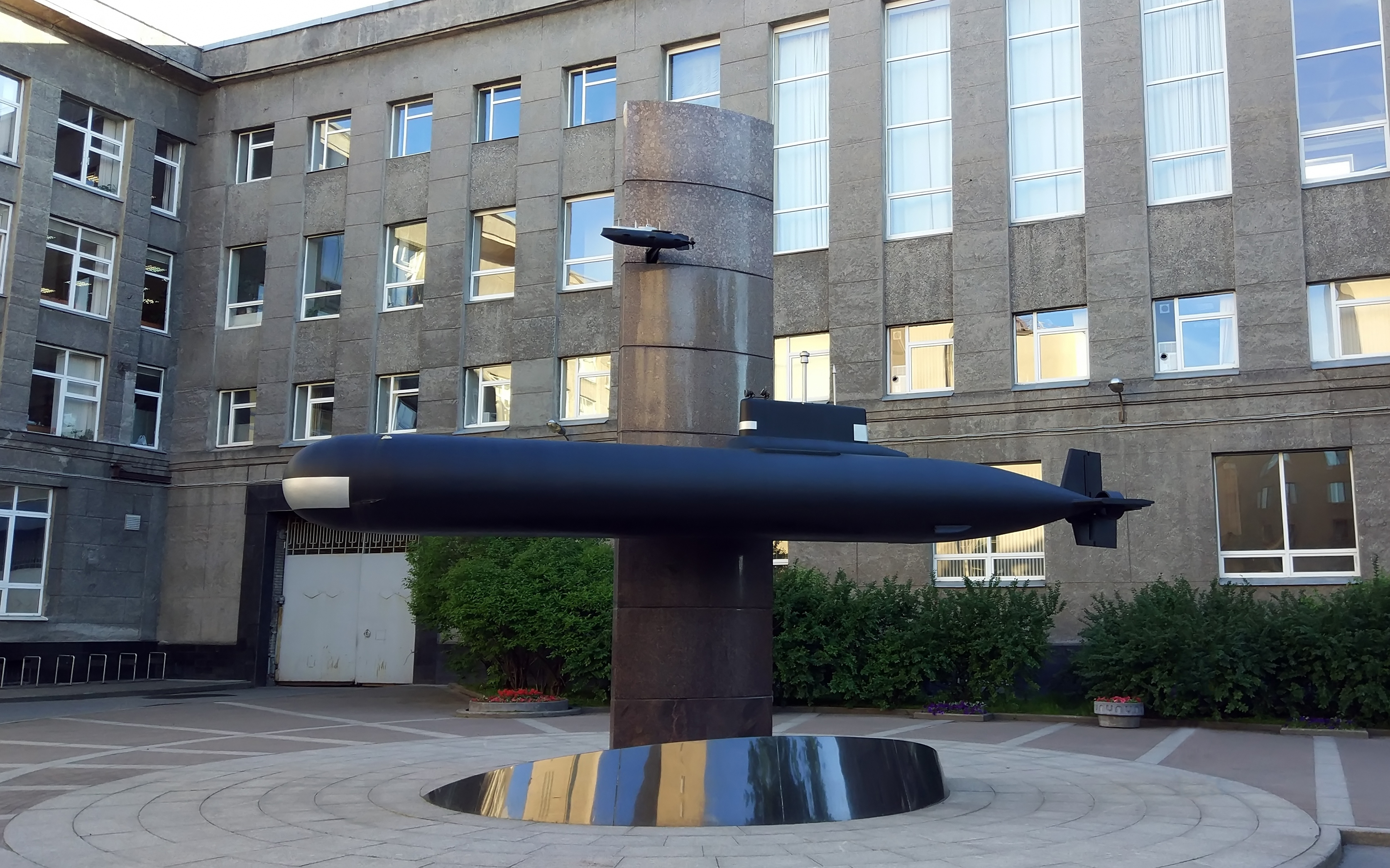
- Indoor square of TsKB "Rubin" with monument showing two notable projects of the bureau - "Dolphin" and "Akula" (Project 941) presented in the same scale
- Company type: State corporation
- Founded: (1900; 126 years ago)
- Headquarters: Saint Petersburg, Russia
- Products: Submarines
- Revenue: $471 million (2015)
- Number of employees: 2000 (1993)
- Parent: United Shipbuilding Corporation
- Website: ckb-rubin.ru

Rubin Central Design Bureau for Marine Engineering (Russian: Центральное конструкторское бюро "Рубин", romanized: Tsentralnoye konstruktorskoye byuro "Rubin"), abbreviated as TsKB "Rubin" (Russian: ЦКБ "Рубин"), located in Saint Petersburg, is the largest of Russia's three main centers of submarine design, the other two being Malakhit Marine Engineering Bureau and Lazurit Central Design Bureau. Rubin has designed more than two-thirds of the nuclear submarines in the Russian Navy. The three design centers are named after minerals: ruby (Russian: рубин), malachite and lazurite.

== History ==
=== Early history ===
On 4 January 1901 the Marine Ministry of Russia assigned the task of designing a combat submarine for the Russian Navy to three officers: Lieutenant M.N. Beklemishev, Lieutenant I.S. Goryunov and naval architect Senior Assistant I.G. Bubnov, an employee at the Ministry's Baltic Shipyard where the construction of the vessel was planned to take place. The men submitted their design to the Marine Ministry on 3 May 1901; it was approved the following July, and the Baltic Shipyard was then awarded the order for construction of Torpedo Boat No. 113 (later renamed combat submarine Dolphin). Bubnov was appointed Head of the Construction Commission for Submarines. It was this Construction Commission that after multiple transformations and name changes became the Rubin Central Design Bureau for Marine Engineering.

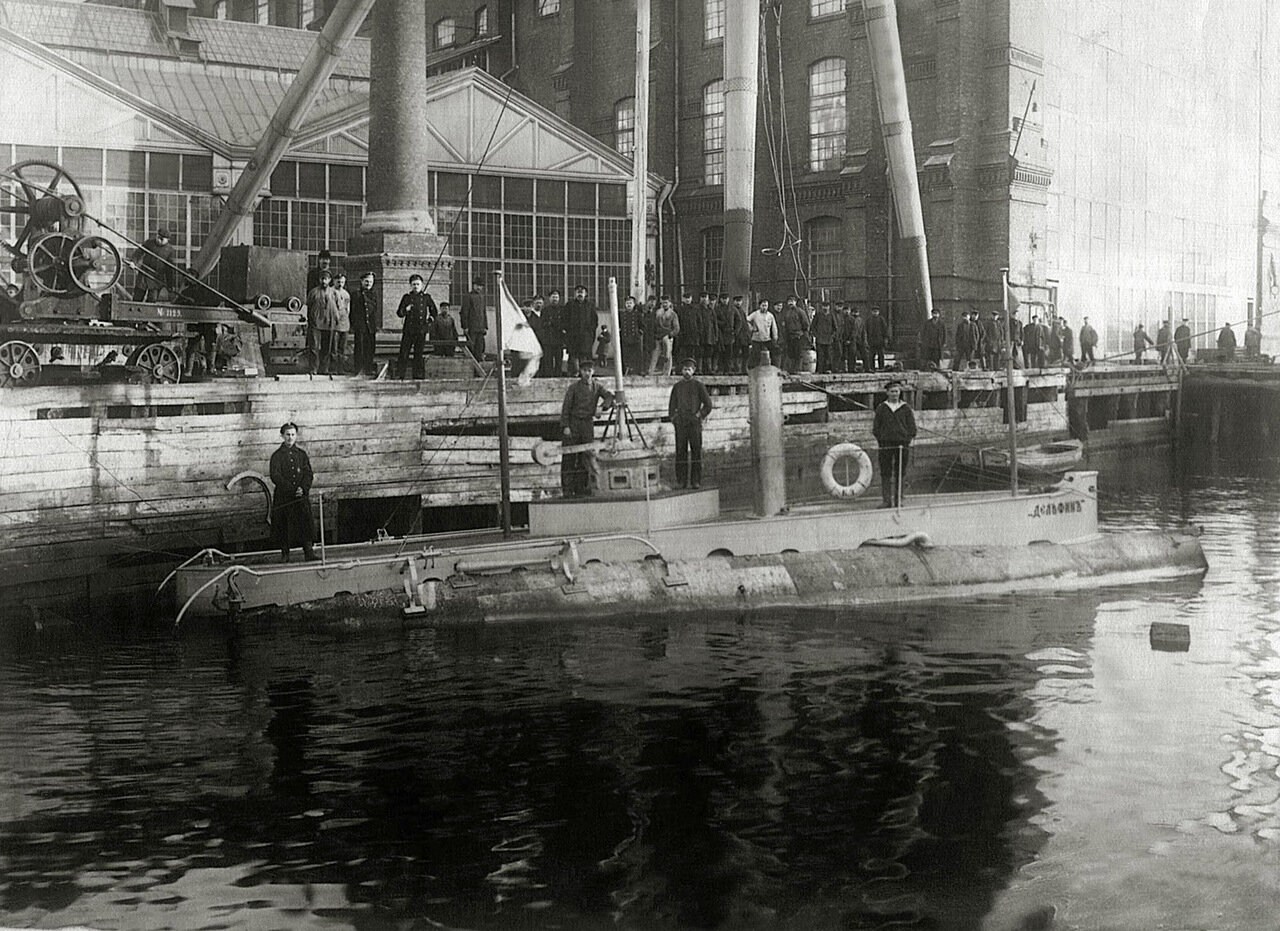
Submarine Dolphin

Construction of the Dolphin was completed in 1903, and its success in subsequent tests was the impetus for the creation of newer, more advanced types of submarines. By 1918 seventy-three submarines of classes Kasatka, Minoga, Akula, Morzh, and Vepr had joined the Russian Navy, and four more of the new class Major-General Bubnov were still under construction. Thirty-two of these were built to the designs of I.G. Bubnov, who had become Major General of the Naval Architect Corps and Honoured Professor at the Nikolayev Marine Academy.

=== Pre-World War II ===
In 1926 the Construction Commission for Submarines became Technical Bureau No. 4, and six years later was renamed the Central Design Bureau for Special (Military) Shipbuilding No. 2, headed by B.M. Malinin. He designed submarines of the Dekabrist, Leninets, and Shchuka classes. Another milestone of the era came in 1935, when Central Design Bureau engineer S.A. Bazilevskiy proposed an air-independent propulsion system which allowed engine operation based on the closed cycle REDO in both surface and submerged submarine conditions. Experiments on this cycle implementation were carried out on board submarines of Series XII M-92 (S-92, R-1).

More change came in 1937, when the Bureau was given the new name Central Design Bureau No. 18 (or TsKB-18), and furthermore became an independent economic organization directly subordinated to the Second Chief Department of People's Commissariat of Defence Industry.

=== World War II ===
By the beginning of World War II, 206 submarines were built to 19 different TsKB-18 designs. 54 more submarines were constructed at the Bureau during the War. During the Siege of Leningrad TsKB-18 was evacuated from Leningrad to Gorkiy.

=== Cold War ===
In 1947 TsKB-18 completed the development of Project 613 (designated the Whiskey-class submarine in NATO classification) – a torpedo diesel-electric submarine of medium displacement which took into account the combat experiences of Soviet and German submarines from the War. Commissioned by the Navy in 1951, the 215 unit series built to Project 613 was the largest in the Soviet Union. Approximately 25 to 30 of the submarines were built in People's Republic of China, and the design was handed over to Chinese technicians.

P.P. Pustyntsev (ru:Пустынцев, Павел Петрович), who headed the Bureau from 1951 to 1974, created the design for Project 641 (NATO classification: Foxtrot), which began development in 1955. 75 units of this class were commissioned to the Navy in 1963. The same year the Hotel-class submarine, which had begun development in 1956 as Project 658, was redesigned to enable underwater launching of D-4 ballistic missiles. In 1965 the Lenin Prize was awarded for works related to the underwater launch of ballistic missiles.

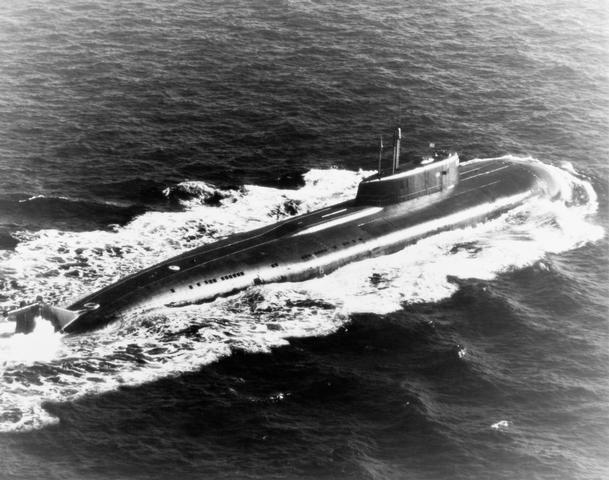
Oscar class submarine

In 1963 Project 667A (NATO classification: Yankee), a second-generation nuclear missile submarine, was developed. Joining the Soviet fleet in 1967, the Project 667A submarine became the first ship of the largest series of nuclear missile submarines (34 units). Later known as "nuclear missile submarine cruisers," improvements to the Yankee-class submarines would include the installation of longer-range and multiple-warhead missiles. The success of submarine Projects 667A and 667B (Delta-class submarines) would be rewarded with Lenin Prizes in 1970 and 1974, respectively. The Yankee-based ballistic missile submarine family comprises: Project 667A Yankee, Project 667B Delta I, Project 667BD Delta II, Project 667BDR Delta III, and Project 667BDRM Delta IV.

TsKB-18 was renamed Rubin in 1966. The Oscar-class submarine started development in 1971, and followed by the Typhoon class (Project 941) in 1976. In 1974 Igor Spassky succeeded Pustyntsev as head of the bureau and remained in the position until the 2000s (decade).

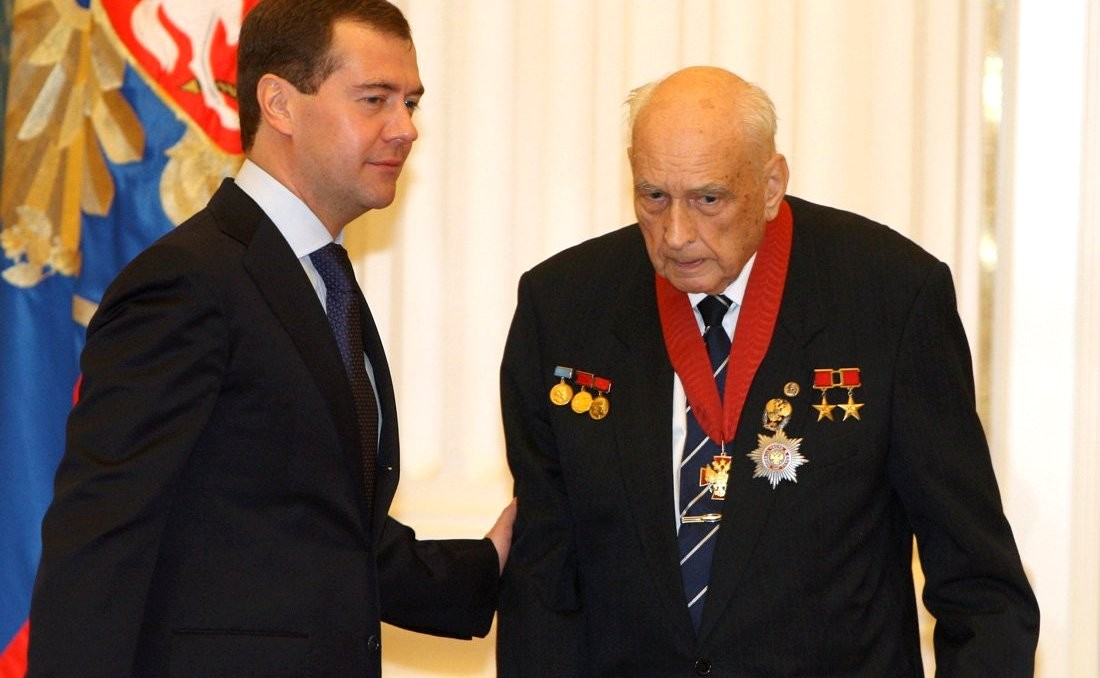
Sergey Kovalev was director of the Rubin Design Bureau

== Present day ==
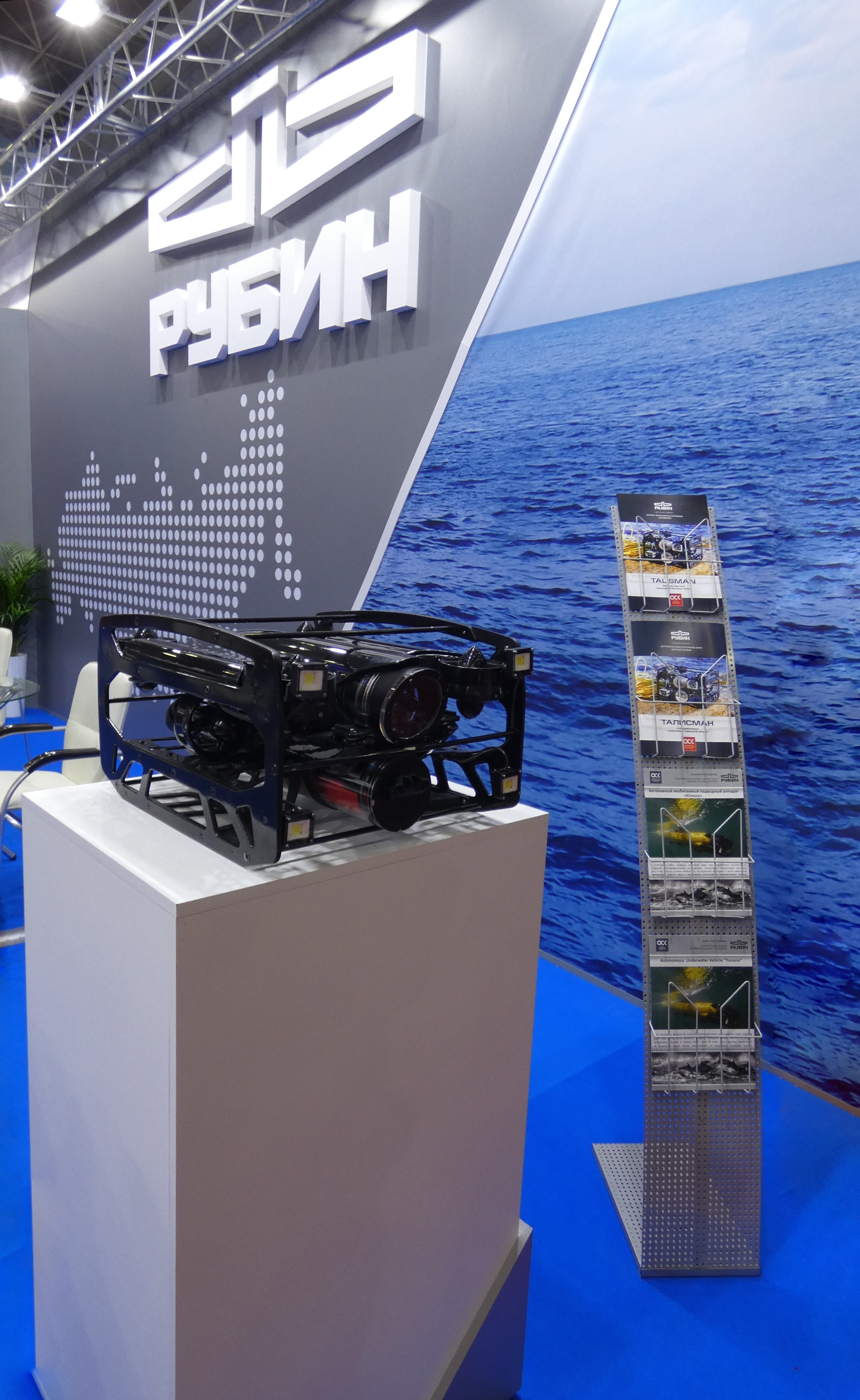
Remote-controlled UUV "Talisman"

=== Market economy ===
Since the advent of Perestroika, Rubin has continued to produce nuclear submarines with such projects as the construction of the fourth-generation ballistic missile Borei class, also known as the Dolgorukiy class, which started in 1996. Rubin now also works with outside companies (including Halliburton) on the production of oil platforms that are now used in drilling around Sakhalin Island in the Sea of Okhotsk and in the waters adjacent to South Korea.

Another of the company's important projects of recent years is Sea Launch, a unique spacecraft launch technology. With marine components produced by Rubin, Sea Launch uses a specially-modified floating oil platform positioned in the equatorial Pacific Ocean, as a launch pad. In 1999, shortly after the company was founded, the Sea Launch consortium claimed that their launch-related operating costs would be lower than a land-based equivalent due in part to reduced staff requirements. The platform and command ship have 310 crew members.

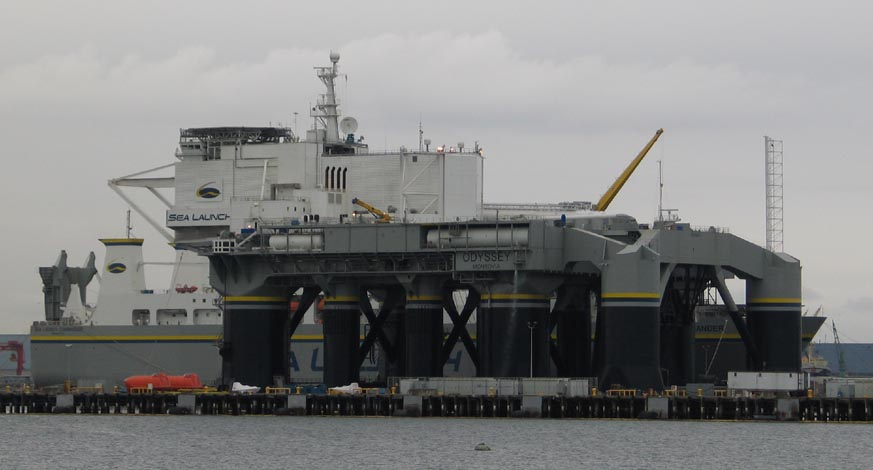
Sea Launch launch platform Ocean Odyssey in its former home port at Long Beach, California

Rubin has also developed such exotic projects as a Submarine Cargo Vessel that can operate year-round in the Arctic Ocean and a Nuclear Underwater Gas Transfer Station for trans-ocean natural gas pipeline transport.

Other recent projects include a high-speed train, the ES-250 Sokol, intended for the Moscow-Saint Petersburg Railway, and a design for a low-floor tram.

As a joint project with the Italian shipbuilding company Fincantieri, Rubin is developing a new diesel air-independent propulsion submarine, the S1000, based on a new fuel cell air independent propulsion system developed in Italy. Its length is 56.2 m (184 ft 5 in) and its displacement is 1,000 tonnes. A mock-up was exhibited at Euronaval 2006.

== See also ==
- Lazurit Central Design Bureau
- Malakhit Marine Engineering Bureau
