= S1000 =

S1000 may refer to:

- S1000 submarine class, a joint development by Russia and Italy
- Akai S1000, a 1988 16-bit professional stereo digital sampler
