= Russian submarine Akula (1909) =

Russian World War I submarine

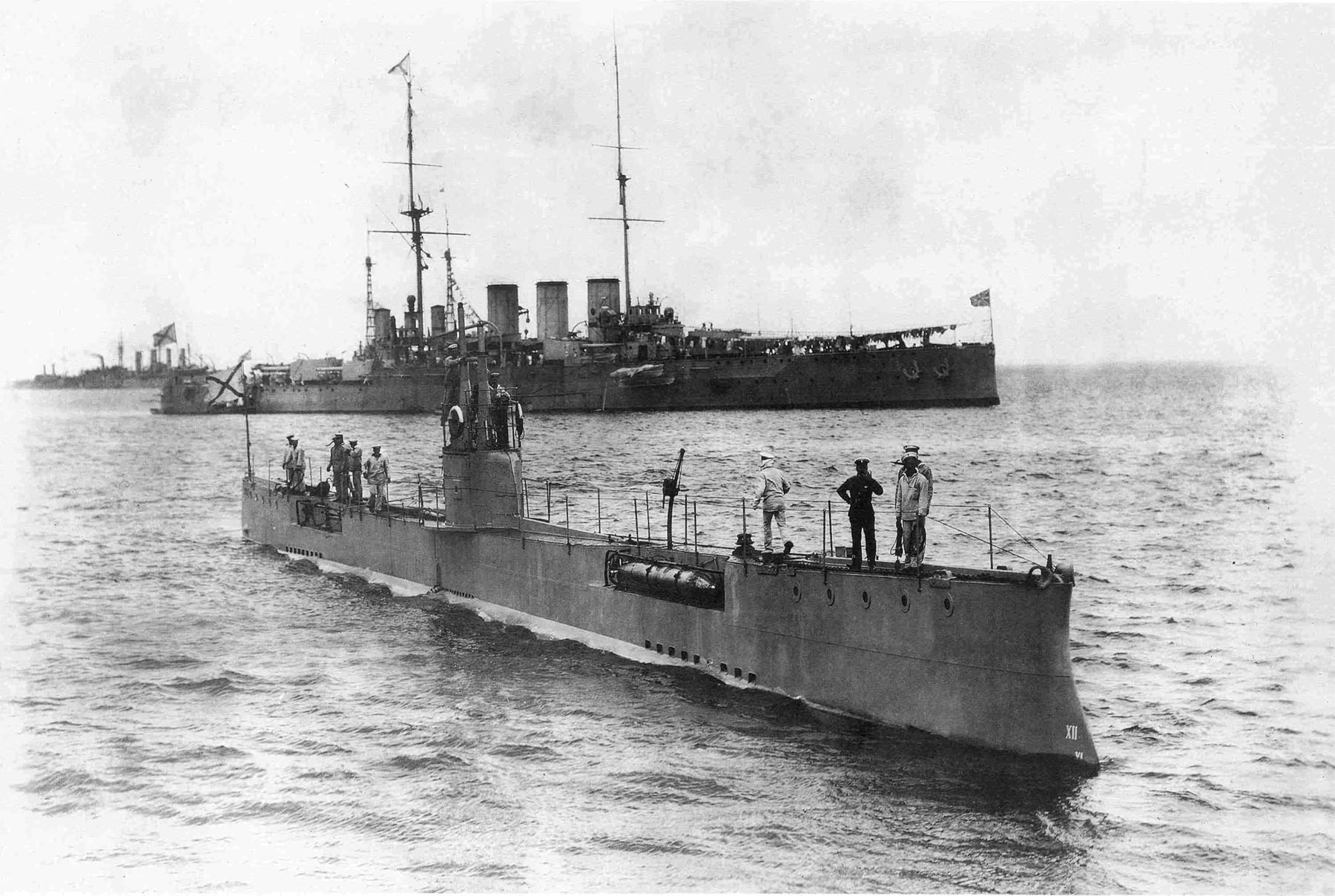
- Russian submarine Akula with the armored cruiser Rurik in the background

History

Russian Empire
- Name: Akula
- Namesake: Shark
- Builder: Baltic Works, Saint Petersburg
- Laid down: December 1906
- Launched: 22 August 1909
- In service: September 1911
- Fate: Sunk by a mine on 28 November 1915

General characteristics
- Type: Submarine
- Displacement: 370 tons surfaced; 475 tons submerged
- Length: 56 m (183 ft 9 in)
- Beam: 3.7 m (12 ft 2 in)
- Draft: 3.4 m (11 ft 2 in)
- Propulsion: Diesel-electric; 3 × 300 hp (220 kW) diesel engines; 1 × 300 hp (220 kW) electric motor; 3 × shafts
- Speed: 10.6 knots (19.6 km/h; 12.2 mph) surfaced; 4.6 knots (8.5 km/h; 5.3 mph) submerged
- Range: 1,900 nmi (3,500 km; 2,200 mi) surfaced; 38 nmi (70 km; 44 mi) submerged
- Test depth: 50 m (160 ft)
- Complement: 24 officers and sailors
- Armament: 1 × 47 mm (1.9 in) deck gun; 4 × 450 mm (18 in) torpedo tubes; 4 × Drzewiecki drop collars

Akula (Russian: Акула, lit. 'shark') was a unique submarine designed by the engineer Ivan Bubnov for the Imperial Russian Navy. It was laid down in December 1906 at the Baltic Works in Saint Petersburg and launched in August 1909. The submarine completed its sea trials and entered service in September 1911. At the time that it entered service Akula was considered the most advanced submarine in the Russian Navy. It was a diesel-electric submarine with three diesel engines and one electric motor, and its armament included one deck gun, four torpedo tubes, and four Drzewiecki drop collars. Akula was used as the basis for the design of the later Morzh and Bars classes.

Akula served in the Russian Baltic Fleet and was considered its only submarine that was capable of more than coastal defense at the start of World War I. Akula became the first Russian submarine to go on offensive operations against enemy vessels instead of waiting for them at an assigned position, and carried out a total of sixteen patrols during the war. It was converted to serve as a minelayer in the fall of 1915 and was lost with its entire crew on its first mission in that capacity, most likely hit by a German naval mine off the Latvian coast, around 28 November 1915.

== Design and construction ==
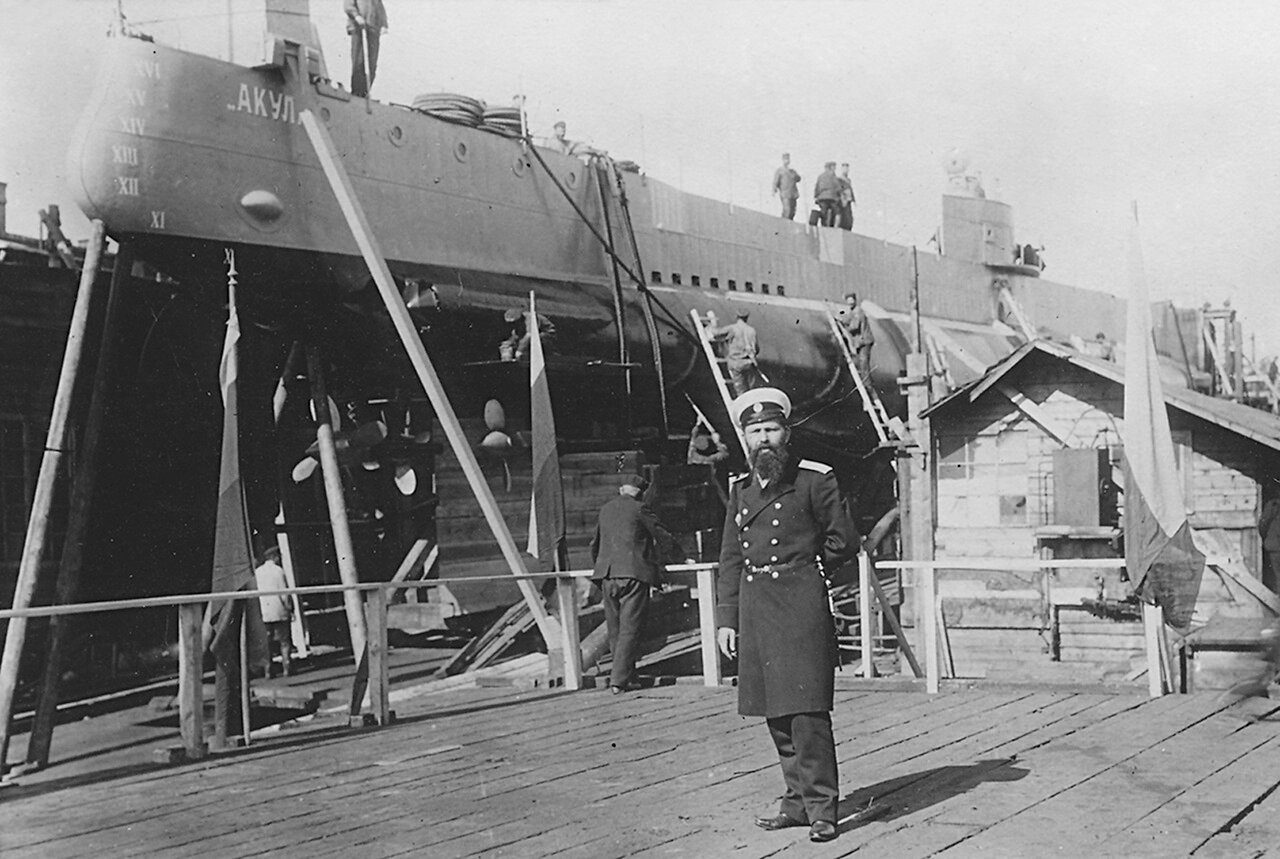
Ivan Bubnov, designer of Akula, in front of the submarine

During the Russo-Japanese War the Imperial Russian Navy used its submarines for patrols within 150 nautical miles of their base at Vladivostok, and the main takeaway from that conflict for Russia's submarine arm was the need to create boats that could operate at longer distances. Akula was designed by the engineer Ivan Bubnov around the same time as the submarine Minoga and represented a larger version of it. Bubnov initially planned for Akula to have two 600 hp (450 kW) diesel engines, but because of problems with production, the design was modified to have three 300 hp (220 kW) diesel engines instead, which moved the boat on the surface by providing power to its three propeller shafts. There was one 225 hp (168 kW) electric motor to power them while it was submerged. That motor was later replaced by one with 300 hp (220 kW). The armament of Akula included four internal 450 mm (18 in) torpedo tubes, two on the bow and two on the stern, along with four external Drzewiecki drop collars, giving it a capacity of eight torpedoes. It also had a 47 mm (1.9 in) deck gun, and may have also had a machine gun.

Akula was a single-hull design and also had adjustable blade propellers. Its crew consisted of 24 officers and men. The boat's length was 56 m (183 ft 9 in), its beam was 3.7 m (12 ft 2 in), and its draft was 3.4 m (11 ft 2 in), while its displacement was 370 tons on the surface and 475 tons submerged. Akula had a top speed of 10.6 knots (19.6 km/h; 12.2 mph) surfaced and 4.6 knots (8.5 km/h; 5.3 mph) submerged, along with a total range of 1,900 nmi (3,500 km; 2,200 mi) surfaced and 38 nmi (70 km; 44 mi) submerged. The submarine was rated to a depth of 50 m (160 ft) and had a diving time of three minutes to reach periscope depth.

After being designed in 1905, the project was approved by the Naval Technological Committee in February 1906, but it was not laid down until December of that year because of financial limitations. After being built at the Baltic Works in Saint Petersburg Akula was launched on 22 August 1909 and underwent sea trials. The construction and testing process experienced delays, because of the slow production of the diesel engines and its original electric batteries being lost in fire in 1907, and Akula also had to have its propellers changed multiple times and its electric motor replaced for one with higher horsepower. It did not finish its sea trials to enter the fleet until September 1911. But upon completion Akula was regarded as the most advanced submarine in the Russian Navy, and its design was used by Bubnov as the basis for the future Morzh and Bars classes.

== Service history ==
Akula entered service in the 2nd Submarine Division of the Baltic Fleet Submarine Brigade and its first commanding officer was S. V. Vlasyev. As of 1913 it had been transferred to the 1st Submarine Division. At the outbreak of World War I, Akula was the only one of the Baltic Fleet's eleven submarines that was considered capable of more than a short-range coastal defense role, and the other boats in the 1st Division were the older Minoga, Makrel, and Okun. The Baltic Fleet Submarine Brigade was supported by multiple submarine tenders and by one rescue ship, Volkhov. After the start of the war, Akula also operated with the British submarine flotilla in the Baltic that was sent by the Royal Navy to assist Russia, and they together were considered the most capable Allied submarines in the region.

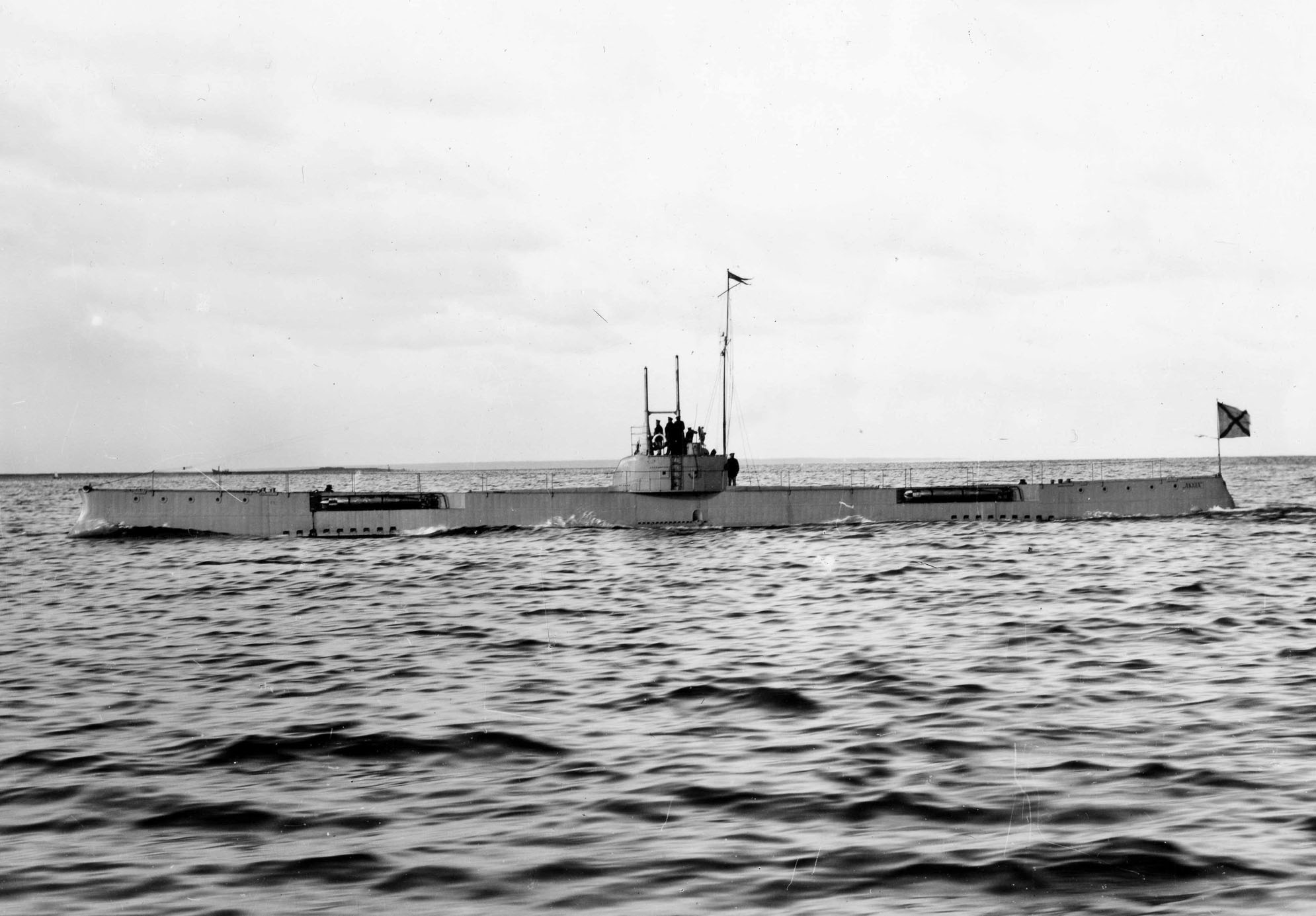
Akula at sea, date unknown

Akula provided security for a minelaying operation by Russian surface ships in October 1914 near of the island of Bornholm. On 10 October, it ran aground in the Soeloesund and was refloated with assistance from another warship. During next year's campaign, following the freezing of the Baltic over the winter, it was sent along with the British HMS E1 and E9 to counter German naval activity near the Gulf of Riga. Akula became the first Russian submarine to actively go on the attack against enemy ships at sea instead of waiting for them to arrive at a predetermined position. After the Imperial German Army occupied the port of Libau it was turned into a forward base for the German fleet in the Baltic and Russian submarine activity in opposition to the German presence increased. On 21 May 1915 Akula attacked the SMS Beowulf, a German coastal defense ship on its way to Libau, by firing two torpedoes, but both of them missed. The next day a German aircraft located Akula traveling on the surface, based on reports from the U-boat SM U-26, and dropped four bombs, though they missed and did not cause any damage. Akula was able to get away.

After the summer of 1915 the German Navy stopped its offensive activities in the Baltic, at which point Akula and the newer large Russian submarines were assigned the task of raiding iron ore shipping. Akula carried out its first patrol searching for merchant ships near Libau from late September to early October, but had no success. Later that fall Akula was modified as a minelayer, with its upper deck being changed to carry four naval mines, and it departed on a minelaying mission on 27 November 1915. Sometime after passing the island of Öesel, the last time it sent a message, the submarine disappeared and was never heard from again. The exact date and cause of its loss is unknown, but it was speculated that Akula was likely sunk by a German minefield off Lyserort around 28 November 1915. In total the submarine carried out sixteen war patrols, and was on its seventeenth patrol when it was lost with all hands.

== Wreck discovery ==
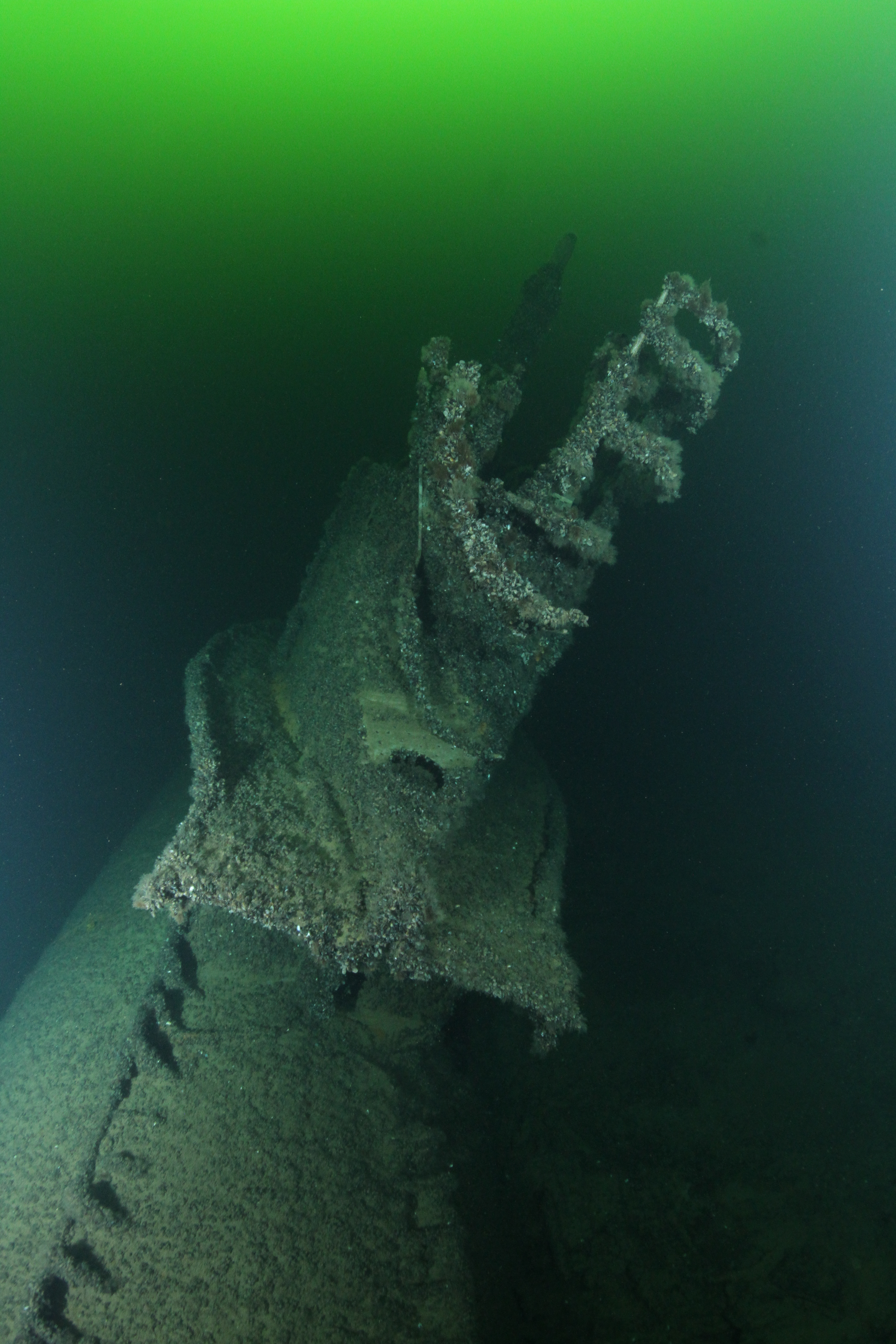
Wreckage in 2014

The wreck of Akula was discovered by Estonian divers in June 2014 at a depth of 30 meters (98 ft).

The wreck has broken apart in the bow due to a mine explosion. The mines have fallen onto the seabed on the port side of the wreck.
