= Russian submarine Minoga =

First Russian Navy diesel-electric submarine

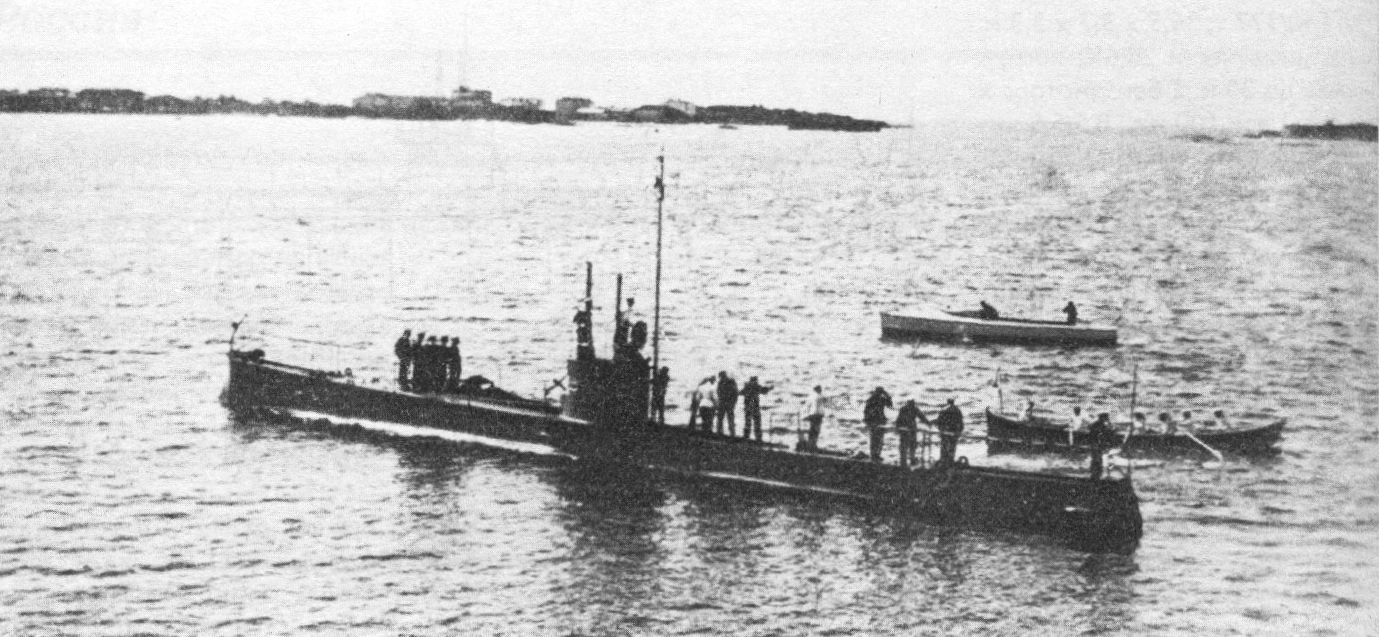
- Minoga, unknown date

History

Russian Empire
- Name: Minoga
- Namesake: Lamprey
- Ordered: 9 February 1906
- Builder: Baltic Works, Saint Petersburg
- Laid down: 6 September 1906
- Launched: 11 October 1908
- Completed: 31 October 1909
- Fate: Captured by Bolsheviks in 1917

Russian SFSR and Soviet Union
- Acquired: 1917
- Stricken: 21 November 1925
- Fate: Scrapped

General characteristics
- Type: Submarine
- Displacement: 117 tons surfaced; 142 tons submerged
- Length: 32.2 m (106 ft)
- Beam: 2.8 m (9 ft 2 in)
- Draught: 2.5 m (8 ft 2 in)
- Propulsion: Diesel-electric; 2 × 120 hp (89 kW) diesel engines; 1 × 140 hp (100 kW) electric motor; 1 × shaft
- Speed: 11 knots (20 km/h; 13 mph) surfaced; 5 knots (9.3 km/h; 5.8 mph) submerged
- Range: 600 nmi (1,100 km) surfaced; 70 nmi (130 km) submerged
- Test depth: 30 m (98 ft)
- Complement: 20 officers and men
- Armament: 2 × 450 mm (18 in) bow torpedo tubes; 1 × 37 mm (1.5 in) deck gun; 1 × machine gun

Minoga (Russian: Минога, lit. 'lamprey') was a unique submarine designed by Ivan Bubnov that became the first diesel-electric submarine in the Imperial Russian Navy. It was inspired by the experience of earlier Russian submarines during the Russo-Japanese War. Minoga was ordered in February 1906 and laid down in September of that year at the Baltic Works in Saint Petersburg. It was launched in October 1908 and entered service in October 1909. It was the first submarine in the Russian Navy to use a diesel engine for power, and its armament included two torpedo tubes, one deck gun, and one machine gun.

Its early service was largely uneventful with the exception of a sinking accident during a training dive in April 1913, after which the submarine was recovered using a crane and there were no casualties among the crew. During World War I Minoga served in the Baltic Fleet and carried out a total of fourteen war patrols. There was only one occasion, in May 1915, that Minoga had the opportunity to fire a torpedo in combat, without success. It was also present at the Battle of the Gulf of Riga in August 1915. Minoga was in Petrograd during the Russian Revolution and was acquired by the Soviet Navy.

Minoga was put into storage in January 1918 and became part of the reserve fleet. In November of that year it was transferred to the Caspian Sea and saw action against the Allied intervention in the Russian Civil War. It was later stored in Baku before being struck from the navy list on 21 November 1925 and scrapped.

== Design and construction ==
During the Russo-Japanese War the Imperial Russian Navy used its submarines for patrols within 150 nautical miles of their base at Vladivostok, and the main takeaway from that conflict for Russia's submarine arm was the need to create boats that could operate at longer distances. The Minoga was a design that naval engineer Ivan Bubnov developed while the war was still ongoing. The submarine was ordered on 9 February 1906 after its approval by the Naval Technological Committee and was laid down at the Baltic Works in Saint Petersburg on 6 September 1906. It was the first Russian submarine to use diesel engines, which were acquired from Ludvig Nobel's factory also in Saint Petersburg, and may have been the first submarine in the world have been equipped with an variable-pitch propeller, giving it improved maneuverability. Minoga had a single-hull design and used saddle tanks.

The submarine had a displacement of 117 tons while on the surface and 142 tons while submerged. Its length was 32.2 m (106 ft), its beam was 2.8 m (9 ft 2 in), and its draft was 2.5 m (8 ft 2 in). The boat's power was provided by two 120 hp (89 kW) diesel engines for moving on the surface and one 140 hp (100 kW) electric motor for moving underwater, using one propeller shaft. This gave it a surface top speed of 11 knots (20 km/h; 13 mph) and a submerged top speed of 5 knots (9.3 km/h; 5.8 mph), as well as a range of 600 nmi (1,100 km) surfaced and 70 nmi (130 km) submerged. Its fuel tank had a capacity of 11 tons. Minoga had a crew of 20 officers and sailors, and was armed with two 450 mm (18 in) bow torpedo tubes, one 37 mm (1.5 in) deck gun, and one machine gun. The deck gun was installed not during the original construction but later in 1914–15.

Minoga was launched on 11 October 1908 and carried out its first test, using one diesel engine for power because the second had not been installed yet, on 23 October. After its first dive on 7 November 1908 a decision was made to modify the ballast and so the submarine was returned to the shipyard. Several months of additional work was done to address various problems with the boat. This was completed in April 1909 and Minoga underwent sea trials before entering service in the Russian Baltic Fleet on 31 October 1909.

== Service history ==
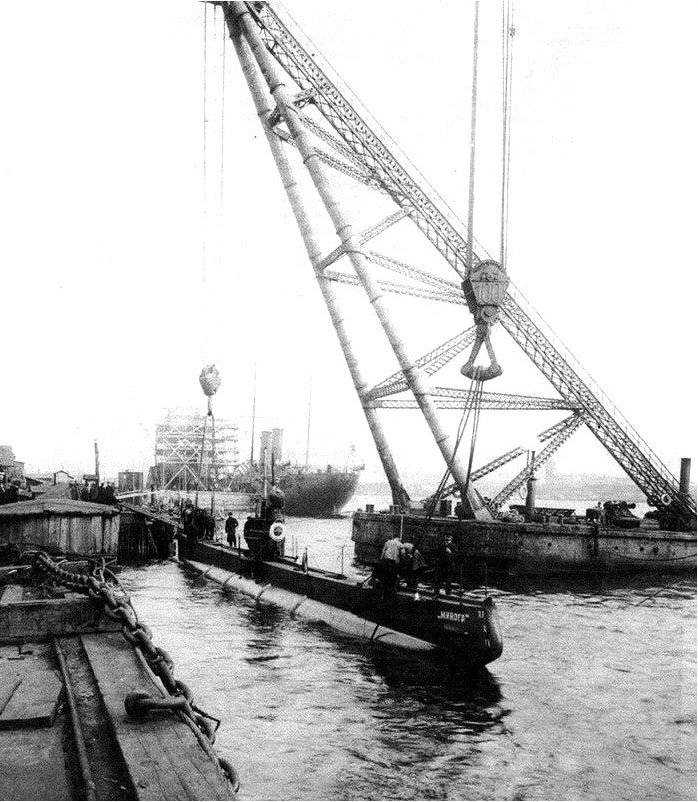
Minoga around the time of the sinking in 1913

The first commanding officer of Minoga was Lieutenant A. V. Brovtsyn before he was replaced in 1912 by Lieutenant A. N. Garsoyev. The boat did not carry out many training exercises and its crew relied on their earlier experience on other submarines. Its early service was largely uneventful, with the exception of one major incident. The submarine sank during a test dive near Libau on 6 April 1913 because a crewman left a signal flag that ended up blocking one ventilation shafts and prevented it from closing during the dive, causing a flood. The crew, unable to use the ballast tanks to return to the surface, sent out an emergency buoy to the surface and also contacted their home base. A crane and other equipment was brought, successfully lifting Minoga from its location underwater and releasing the crew. In total they had been in the submarine for twelve hours and there were no deaths, although they were sick from chlorine that was produced by water making contact with the electric battery and from the cold.

At the outbreak of World War I Minoga was in the 1st Submarine Division of the Baltic Fleet, alongside Akula, Makrel, and Okun. The fleet's submarines at the start of the war were considered only capable of short-range coastal defense, with the exception of Akula. Minoga went eight war patrols in the Gulf of Finland and the Gulf of Bothnia in the fall of 1914, between July and October. Out of these there was one recorded encounter with German ships. During its last patrol of the campaign season, on 16 October, Minoga spotted the German cruiser SMS Friedrich Carl but it was too fast for the submarine to get close enough for an attack. When the Baltic Sea waters froze during the winter Minoga remained in port with the rest of the fleet until spring began the 1915 campaign season. Over the winter of 1914–15 the submarine underwent modifications that involved the addition of a machine gun.

The 1915 campaign season brought the only instance of Minoga firing a torpedo in combat. On 22 May 1915, the submarine encountered a German steamship traveling between Libau and Memel. It fired one torpedo but missed, and the ship's crew spotted the submarine and were able to get away. Minoga then returned to its base. In June 1915 it participated with other Russian submarines in disrupting German naval operations, which were meant to assist the German ground campaign in the Courland region. On 7 June, the submarine was spotted by the German destroyer V182 and caused it to withdraw from the area, disrupting a minelaying operation. During the Battle of the Gulf of Riga that August, Minoga, together with Makrel and Okun, were part of the line of defense inside the Gulf at the Irbe Strait.

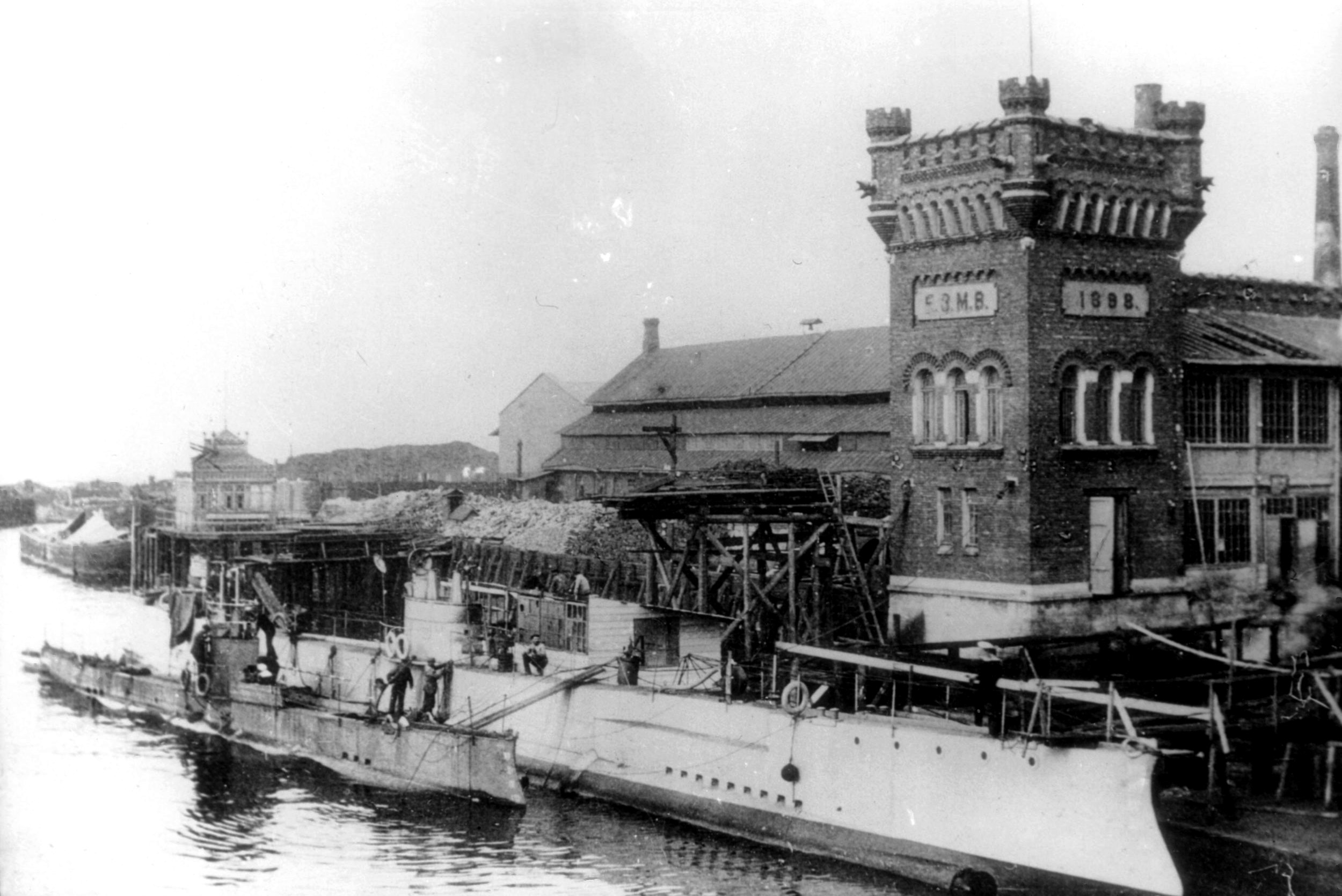
Minoga next to the larger Akula

During the following campaign season, in August 1916 the submarine ran aground in the Gulf of Riga, but was able to break free by moving in reverse. After that it underwent repairs in Reval. Later on in the war, as more advanced submarines of the Bars-class entered service, Minoga and some other older boats were transferred to the 4th Submarine Division. In total Minoga made fourteen war patrols during the conflict. When the February Revolution occurred it was in Petrograd, and the submarine was later acquired by the Baltic Fleet of the Soviet Navy, but was put into storage on 31 January 1918. In July of that year Minoga was made part of the reserve flotilla of the Red Baltic Fleet.

Minoga, along with Okun, Makrel, and Kasatka were sent to the Caspian Sea in November 1918. They were moved by railroad to Saratov, from where they used their own power to get to Astrakhan via the Volga river, where they became part of the Naval Forces of the Caspian Sea. During the Russian Civil War in the Caspian Minoga took part in combat against the British intervention forces and was later left in storage in Baku. It was struck from the Soviet Navy list on 21 November 1925 and scrapped.
