= Russian submarine Delfin =

First Russian combat submarine

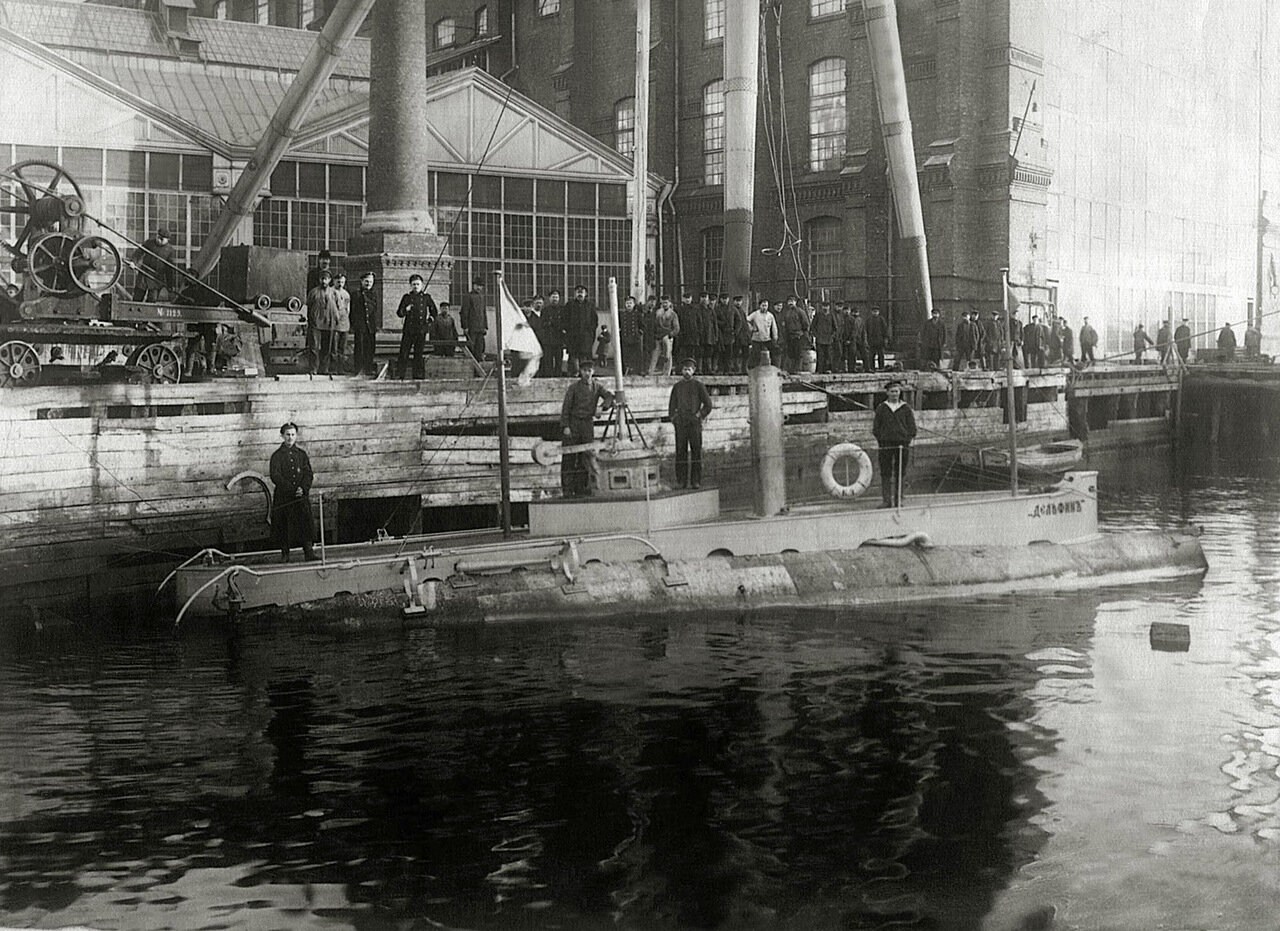
- Delfin in 1903

History

Russian Empire
- Name: Delfin (formerly No. 113 and No. 150)
- Namesake: Dolphin
- Builder: Baltic Works, Saint Petersburg
- Laid down: 5 July 1901
- Launched: May 1903
- Stricken: August 1917
- Fate: Scrapped in 1932

General characteristics
- Type: Midget submarine
- Displacement: 113 tons surfaced; 126 tons submerged
- Length: 19.6 m (64 ft)
- Beam: 3.35 m (11.0 ft)
- Draught: 2.9 m (9 ft 6 in)
- Propulsion: 2 × 150 hp (110 kW) gasoline engines; 1 × 120 hp (89 kW) electric motor; 1 × shaft
- Speed: 9 knots (17 km/h; 10 mph) surfaced; 4.5 knots (8.3 km/h; 5.2 mph) submerged
- Range: 243 nmi (450 km) surfaced; 35 nmi (65 km) submerged
- Test depth: 50 m (160 ft)
- Complement: 12 officers and men
- Armament: 2 × 15 in (380 mm) torpedoes in Drzewiecki drop collars; 1 × machine gun

Delfin (Russian: Дельфин, lit. 'dolphin') was the first combat-capable Russian submarine. It was laid down in July 1901 by the Baltic Works in Saint Petersburg, added to the Imperial Russian Navy list in September 1902, and launched in May 1903 before beginning sea trials in the Gulf of Finland in June 1903. The trials were finished in October of that year and the submarine entered service, initially designated as a torpedo boat. During its construction it was initially named No. 113, which was later changed to No. 150, before finally receiving the name Delfin on 13 June 1904. The submarine's armament included two Drzewiecki drop collars on the outside of the submarine, each holding one torpedo, and a single machine gun.

It was first used as a training boat for new submariners as the Russian Navy decided to expand its submarine fleet and started preparing their crews before new vessels were completed. Despite being considered a success Delfin suffered two serious accidents early on in its career, a sinking in June 1904 and a large explosion in May 1905, with loss of life among the crew in both cases. Delfin was sent to the Pacific during the Russo-Japanese War and patrolled the coastal area near Vladivostok in the first half of 1905 to deter Japanese attacks. After the war it was used as a training boat for officers and crew and remained in the Russian Far East until the spring of 1916.

The final assignment of the submarine was serving in the role of coastal defense off Kola Bay after being transferred to the Arctic Ocean Flotilla. It was damaged in a storm and eventually struck from the navy list in August 1917. Delfin was scrapped in 1932.

== Background ==
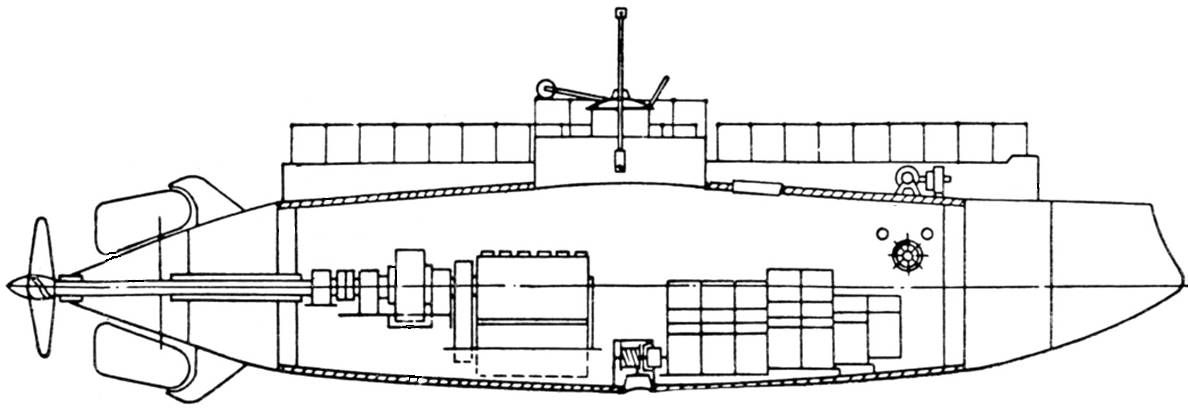
Delfin schematics

In the 19th century the Imperial Russian Navy had been among the European navies that took interest in developing submarines and several experimental underwater craft were built by Russia during that time, with the earliest dating back to the reign of Peter the Great. Although not all of these projects were successful, they allowed the Russian Navy to get an understanding of submarine design and construction. The interest in submarine development continued by the turn of the century, and on 19 December 1900 a submarine committee was founded within the Naval Technological Committee (MTK), led by the engineer Ivan Bubnov, who would be responsible for the design of most tsarist submarines up until the Russian Revolution of 1917. The other members of the organization were engineer Ivan Goryunov and the officer Mikhail Beklemishev. The submarine committee was tasked with studying foreign designs as preparation for designing and constructing a combat submarine for the Russian Navy.

== Design and construction ==
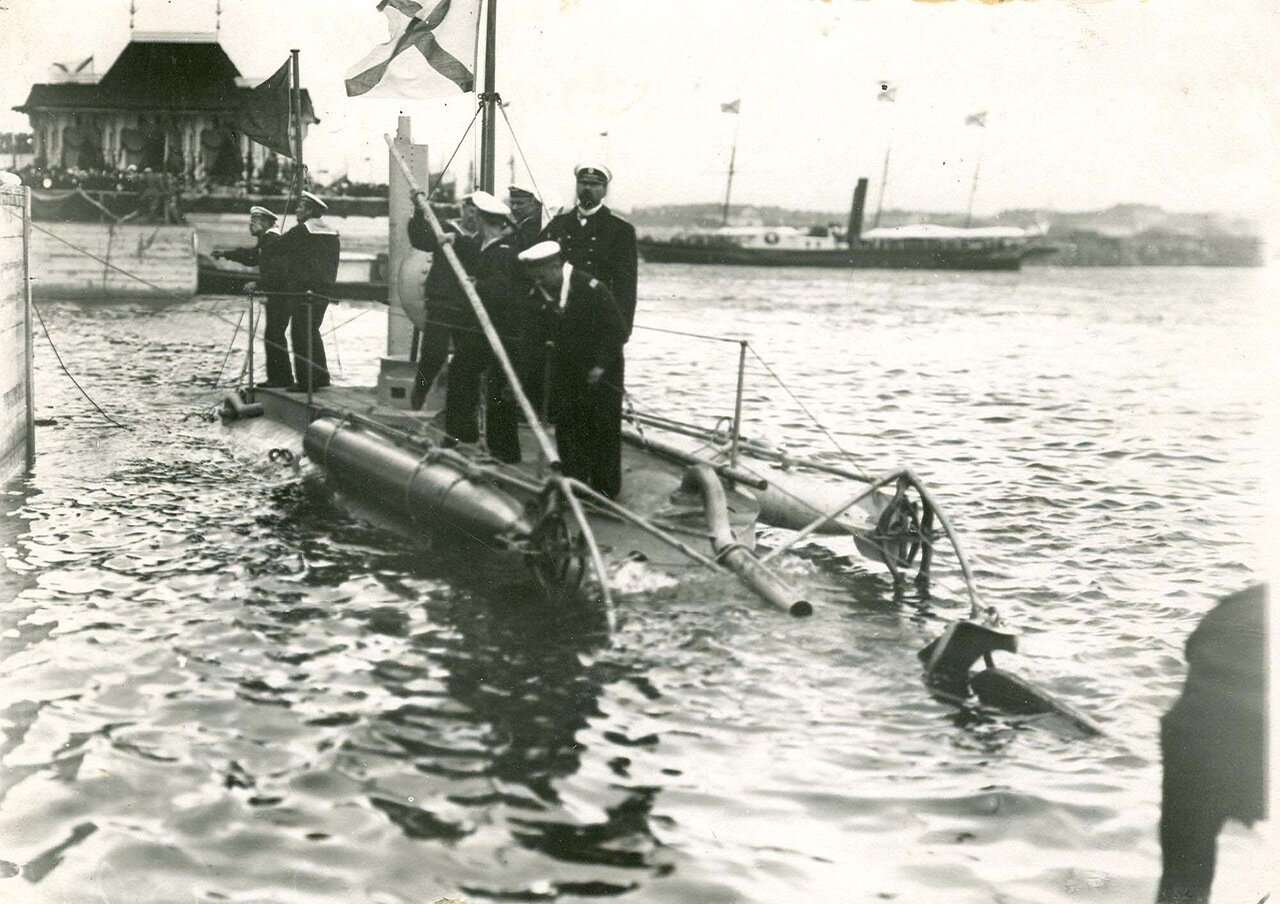
Delfin being launched

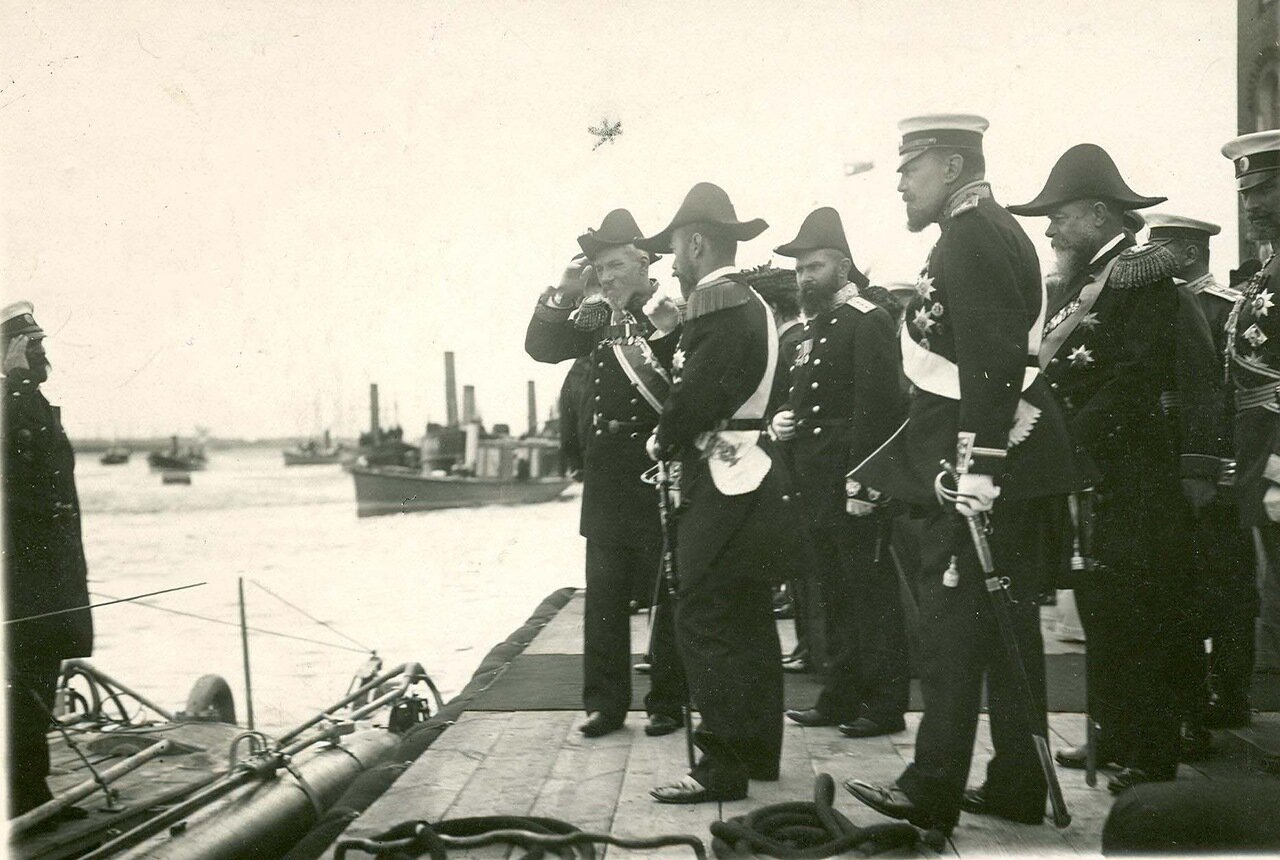
Emperor Nicholas II, Grand Duke Alexei Alexandrovich, and Ivan Bubnov inspecting

On 16 June 1901 the Russian submarine designers led by Ivan Bubnov presented a proposal to the Naval Technological Committee which was a version of John P. Holland boats with modifications made by Bubnov. This design would become the Delfin. Bubnov's changes included changing the position of the ballast tanks and replacing internal torpedo tubes with Drzewiecki drop collars which held torpedoes on the outside of the boat. The proposal was quickly approved and the submarine, designated as torpedo boat No. 113, was laid down on 5 July 1901 at the Baltic Works in Saint Petersburg. It was labeled a torpedo boat by the Russian Navy because there were no commissioned submarines in the fleet up to this point.

The submarine that was later renamed Delfin had a single hull, the outside of which was covered with teak as protection in case of grounding, and saddle tanks. Its propulsion was provided by two 150 hp (110 kW) gasoline engines for moving on the surface and by one 120 hp (89 kW) electric motor to move the boat underwater, giving power to the one propeller shaft. An engineer involved with the project, Ivan Goryunov, proposed equipping it with diesel engines, but there were limitations on their production and ultimately gasoline engines were used instead. This gave it a speed of 9 knots (17 km/h; 10 mph) while surfaced and 4.5 knots (8.3 km/h; 5.2 mph) while submerged, along with a total range of 243 nmi (450 km) surfaced and 35 nmi (65 km) submerged.

The submarine was rated to a depth of 50 m (160 ft). Delfin had a displacement of 113 tons on the surface and 126 tons while underwater, and a crew of 12 officers and men. Its length was 19.6 m (64 ft), its beam was 3.35 m (11.0 ft), and its draft was 2.9 m (9 ft 6 in). Delfin's armament consisted of one machine gun and two torpedoes, each carried in a Drzewiecki drop collar.

It was added to the navy list on 27 September 1902 as No. 150 and that same year the first crew members began to be gathered. The submarine was launched in May 1903 and the sea trials began the following month on 21 June in the Gulf of Finland. They were a success, although they also showed that it had a diving time of 12 minutes. The time to reach periscope depth was later reduced to five minutes. The submarine was inspected by Emperor Nicholas II and other officials on the Neva river in late August 1903. The trials were completed on 14 October, which is considered to be the founding date of the Russian submarine fleet. No. 150 became the first combat submarine in the Russian Navy, though it continued to be classified as a "torpedo boat" until March 1906. After finishing the trials No. 150 returned to the Baltic Works where it underwent some modifications, including the installation of a latrine for the crew.

== Service history ==
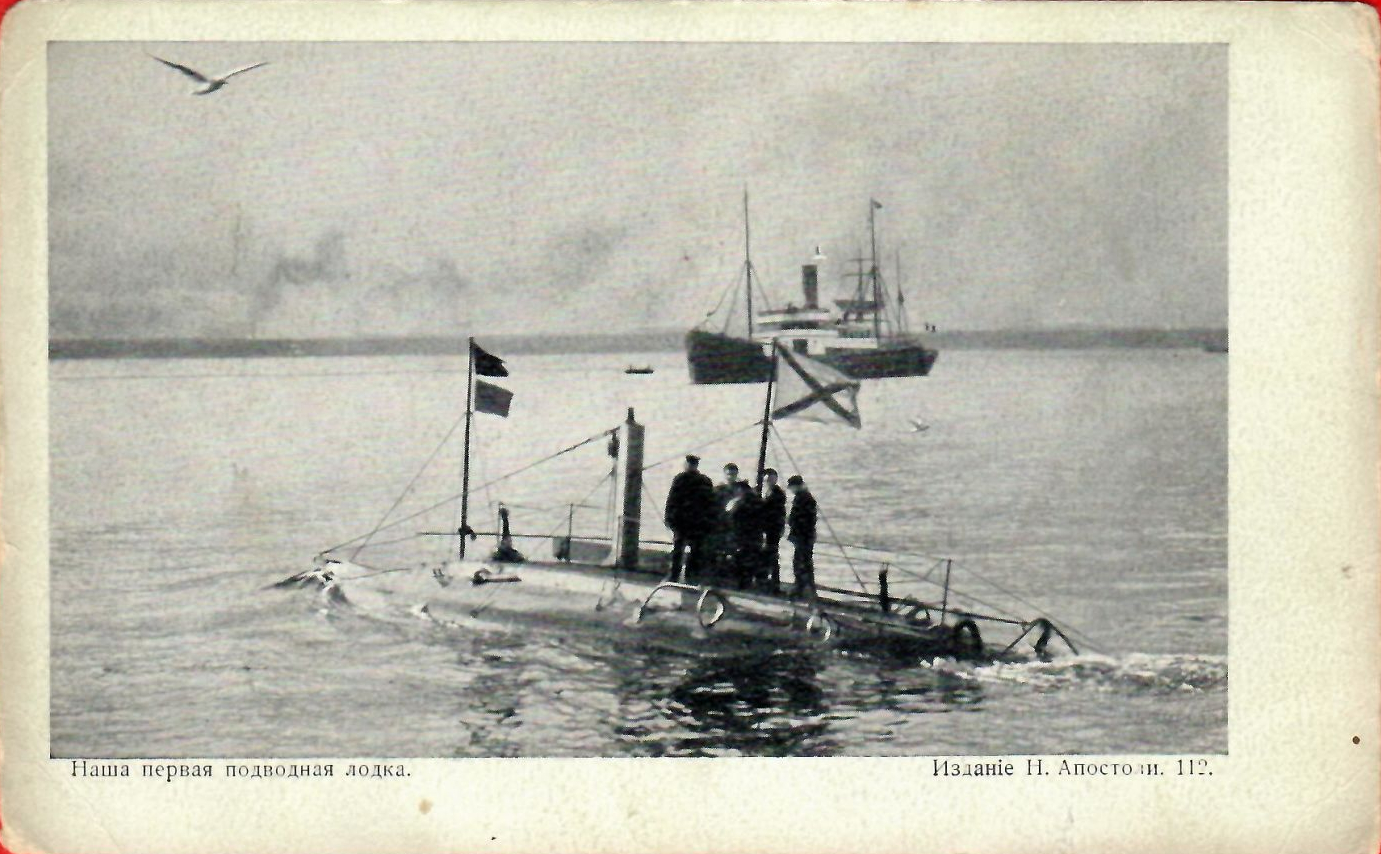
Delfin on a post card c. 1904, labelled "our first submarine"

Lieutenant Mikhail Beklemishev, who worked on the construction of the submarine, became its first commanding officer and selected the crew from among volunteers who were mechanically inclined, had served well, and did not smoke. After the start of the Russo-Japanese War in early 1904 it was used as a training boat for new submariners. The Russian Navy decided to build more submarines based on the success of No. 150 and in December 1903 approved a design by Ivan Bubnov and Beklemishev for a larger submarine class, which became the Kasatka class. No. 150 was used to train the crews for the new vessels even before they were finished and on 13 June 1904 its name was changed to Delfin.

An incident occurred on 29 June 1904 when Delfin performed a training dive along a wall at the Baltic Works. At the time there were 34 people on board, with many of them being submariner trainees. Beklemishev was not there and the acting captain was Lieutenant Anatoly Cherkasov. The design of the submarine required the use of the main hatch to remove air from the ballast tanks, which was then to be closed at the last moment. On that occasion Cherkasov waited too long to close the hatch and water started leaking into the submarine, causing one of the other sailors to panic and try to rush out of the hatch, which only increased the flow of water. This caused the boat to sink, and although two officers and eight sailors were able to eventually get out and swim to the surface the other 24 men died, including Cherkasov. Two days later Delfin was raised and sent to the Baltic Works for repairs. The sailors and officers who died were given a burial at the Smolensky Cemetery in Saint Petersburg. The survivors all chose to remain in the submarine service.

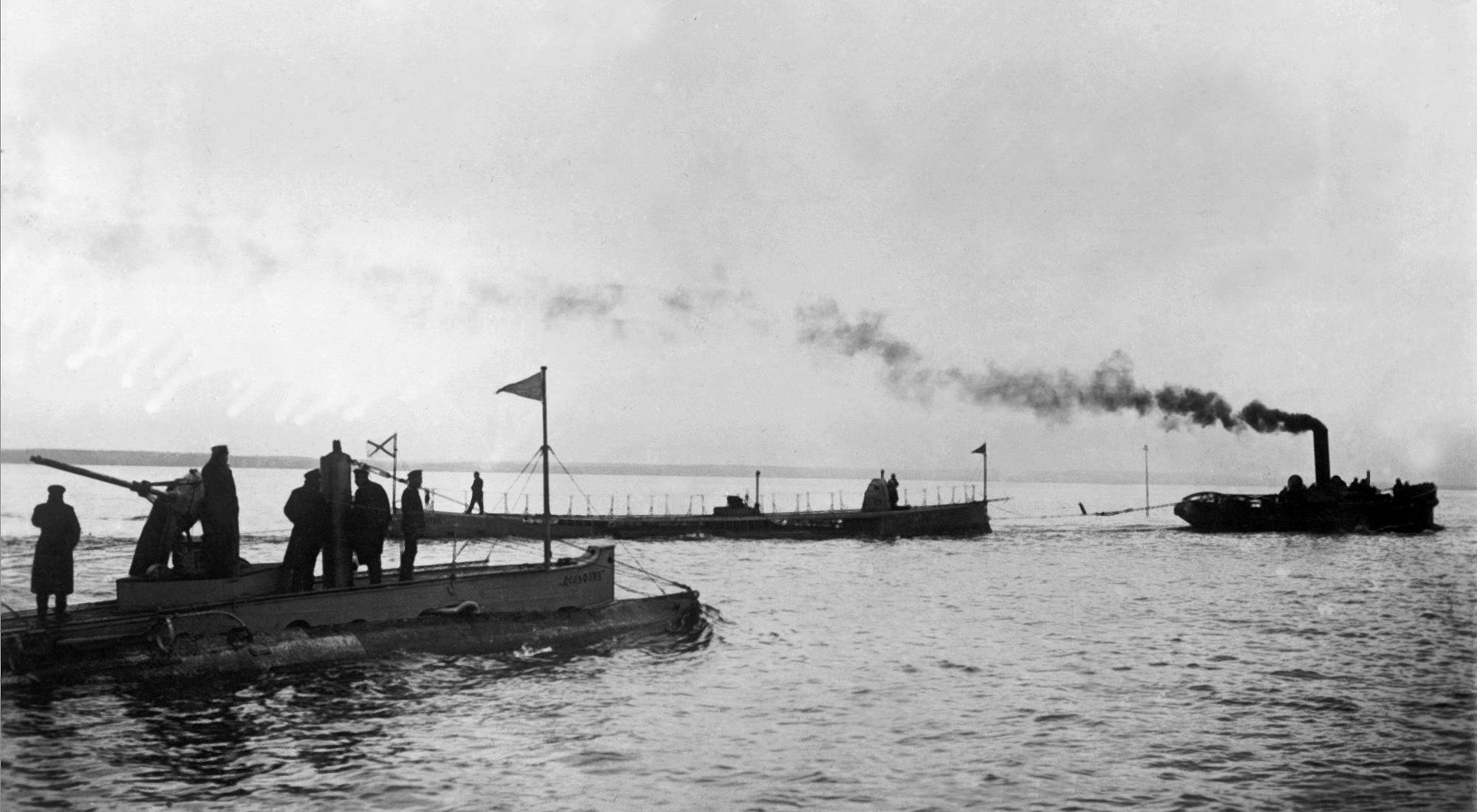
Delfin (foreground) with the submarine Kasatka in the Far East

Delfin was later assigned to the squadron in the Russian Far East for service in the ongoing Russo-Japanese War. It was taken by railroad to Vladivostok, arriving on 7 October 1904. The submarine carried out its first war patrol in February 1905 and went on several more over the course of that year. Delfin and the other 12 Russian submarines that were active during the war operated within 150 nautical miles of their home base and their main purpose was to use their presence to deter a Japanese attack on Vladivostok.

A second incident happened on 5 May 1905. The gasoline tanks were being ventilated as part of a process to fix a problem with one of its other components, but while this was going on a spark from one of the crewmen on board turning on a light caused an explosion in the submarine. Two of the three men aboard at the time died and another explosion after that caused the submarine to sink. It was later lifted to the surface and underwent extensive repairs. Delfin reentered service in June. After being returned to service the boat was once again used for crew and officer training and spent over a decade stationed in the Far East, being part of the submarine unit of the Siberian Flotilla in Vladivostok. On 9 December 1914 Delfin suffered another explosion, while its electric batteries were being charged.

Delfin was one of the eight submarines of the Siberian Flotilla at the outbreak of World War I. In February 1916, Delfin was transferred from its base in Vladivostok to the Arctic Ocean Flotilla in Arkhangelsk, being moved first by railroad and later by the Northern Dvina river. At its new assignment the submarine was used for coastal defense off Kola Bay. After being damaged in a storm a decision was made not to restore it, and in August 1917 it was struck from the navy list. According to one source Delfin may have sunk in Murmansk on 5 September 1917. If that is the case, it was later raised, and may have been used as part of ship recovery equipment before being scrapped in 1932. In the 1920s the commander of the Baltic Fleet submarine division, Yakov Zubarev, proposed that Delfin be preserved as a monument due to its role as the first Russian combat submarine, but this was not done.
