= Ivan Bubnov =

Russian Empire marine engineer (1872–1919)

Ivan Grigoryevich Bubnov
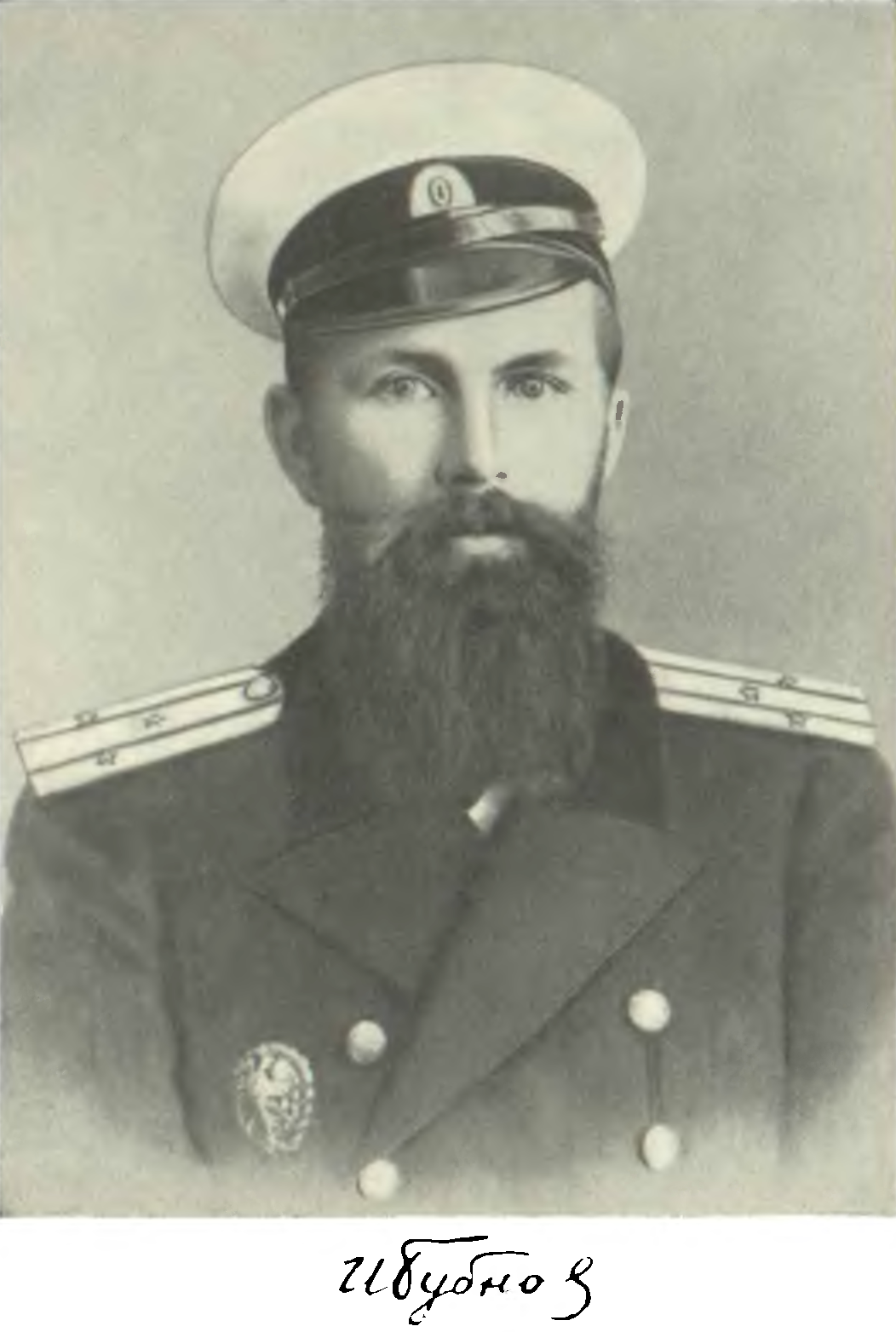
- Ivan Bubnov
- Native name: Иван Григорьевич Бубнов
- Born: January 18, 1872; Nizhny Novgorod, Nizhegorodsky Uyezd, Nizhny Novgorod Governorate, Russian Empire
- Died: March 13, 1919 (aged 47) Petrograd
- Allegiance: Russian Empire
- Branch: Imperial Russian Navy
- Service years: 1907–1917
- Rank: Major general of the Corps of Naval Constructors

Ivan Grigoryevich Bubnov (Russian: Ива́н Григо́рьевич Бу́бнов; 18 January 1872 – 13 March 1919) was a Russian naval engineer and mathematician who became the chief designer of submarines for the Imperial Russian Navy. He was responsible for designing most submarines of the Russian Navy before the Russian Revolution of 1917.

== Early life and education ==
Bubnov was born in Nizhny Novgorod and graduated from the Marine Engineering College in Kronstadt in 1891. He graduated from the Nikolayev Naval Academy in 1896.

== Career ==
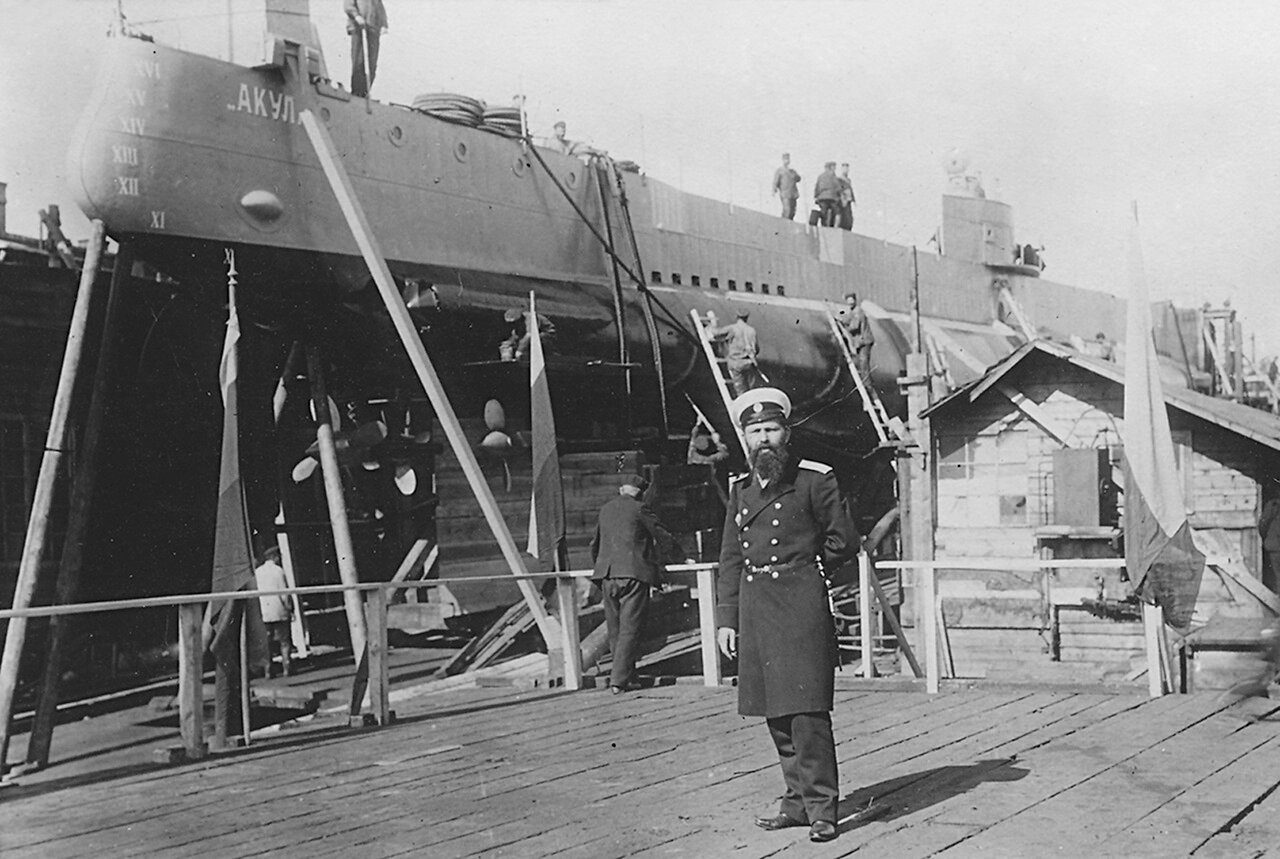
Bubnov standing in front of Akula under construction

He initially joined the Admiralty Shipyard in Saint Petersburg and worked as a constructor on the battleship Poltava.

In 1900, he was appointed Chief Assistant at the Russian Admiralty test tank and was involved in the design of the first Russian submarine, the Delfin. In 1903, he became the Russian Admiralty's submarine designer and was responsible for the following submarine classes:

- Kasatka class
- Minoga
- Akula
- Morzh class
- Bars class

In 1904, Bubnov became a lecturer at the Saint Petersburg Polytechnical University. He was commissioned into the Navy in 1907 and was head of the Admiralty test tank between 1908 and 1914.

Bubnov was promoted to major general in the Corps of Naval Engineers in 1912. Between 1912 and 1917, he was a consultant to the Baltic Works in Saint Petersburg and the Nobel & Lessner shipyard in Reval.

Bubnov died of typhoid in Petrograd in 1919.

== See also ==
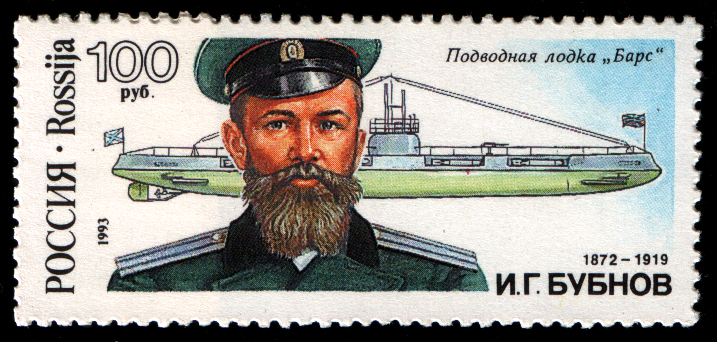
Russian stamp from 1993 with Bubnov and the Bars-class

- Bubnov–Galerkin method

== Sources ==
- Friedman, Norman & Noot, Jurrien (1991). Submarines of the Russian and Soviet Navies, 1718–1990. Annapolis, Maryland: Naval Institute Press. ISBN 0-87021-570-1.
