= Kasatka-class submarine =

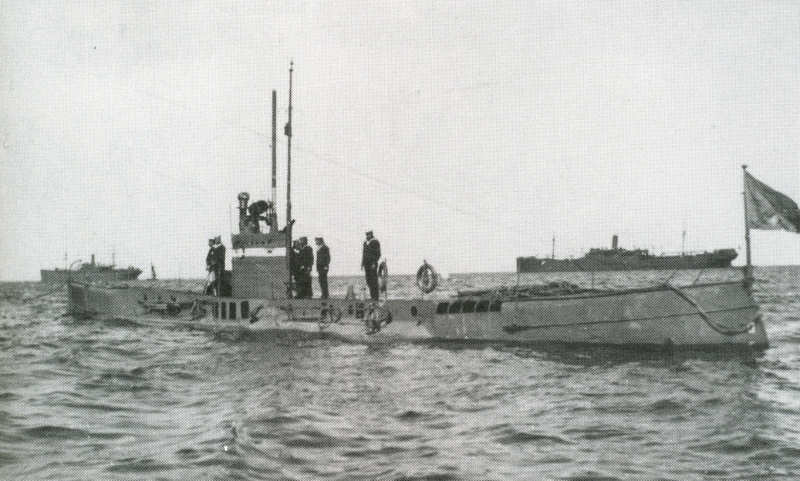
- Russian submarine Okun

Class overview
- Name: Kasatka class
- Builders: Baltic works
- Operators: Imperial Russian Navy
- Preceded by: Som class
- In commission: 1904–1922
- Completed: 6
- Lost: 2
- Scrapped: 4

General characteristics as designed
- Type: Submarine
- Displacement: 142 t (140 long tons) surfaced; 180 t (177 long tons) submerged
- Length: 33.5 m (109 ft 11 in)
- Beam: 3.5 m (11 ft 6 in)
- Draught: 3.4 m (11 ft 2 in)
- Propulsion: 1 shaft petrol / electric (later diesel electric); 150 kW (200 bhp) / 75 kW (100 hp)
- Speed: 8.5 knots (15.7 km/h; 9.8 mph) surfaced; 5.5 knots (10.2 km/h; 6.3 mph) submerged
- Range: 700 nmi (1,300 km; 810 mi) at 8 knots (15 km/h; 9.2 mph) (surfaced); 50 nmi (93 km; 58 mi) at 3 knots (5.6 km/h; 3.5 mph) (submerged)
- Complement: 24
- Armament: 4 external torpedoes in Drzewiecki drop collars; 1 machine gun

The Kasatka class was a class of submarines built for the Imperial Russian Navy. The six boats were built between 1904 and 1905. They were designed by I. G. Bubnov and were based on the Delfin. The first boat, Kasatka, experienced significant problems with stability on trials and had to have extra flotation added. In 1905, four of the class were transferred from Western Russia to Vladivostok with the outbreak of the Russo-Japanese War. Initially powered by a kerosene/electrical system, the boats were re-built around 1910 with a diesel-electric power plant following the end of the war. The class remained in service throughout World War I. Two were captured by the German Empire in 1918 and handed over to the British following the German surrender. They were scuttled by the British in 1919 to prevent their capture by the Soviets. The remaining four were broken up for scrap in 1922.

== Design and description ==
I. G. Bubnov was tasked with producing a submarine design following experience with the Russian submarine Delfin, which had been deemed a success. The design was accepted by the Naval Technical Committee on 20 December 1903. As designed the class had a surfaced displacement of 142 tonnes (140 long tons) and displaced 180 tonnes (177 long tons) when submerged. They were 33.5 metres (109 ft 11 in) long with a beam of 3.5 metres (11 ft 6 in) with a draught of 3.4 metres (11 ft 2 in). The submarines were propelled by one shaft powered by a kerosene engine for travel on the surface rated at 150 kilowatts (200 bhp) and an electric motor rated at 89 kilowatts (120 hp). (Note: Watts has the petrol engine rated at 130 kilowatts (180 bhp) and the electric motor rated at 45 kilowatts (60 hp).) The Kasatka class had a maximum speed of 8.5 knots (15.7 km/h; 9.8 mph) on the surface and 5.5 knots (10.2 km/h; 6.3 mph) submerged. Initially the design called for a three-shaft propulsion system, but due to the increased hostilities with the Empire of Japan, the submarines were completed with only the one shaft-design. They had a range of 700 nautical miles (1,300 km; 810 mi) at 8 knots (15 km/h; 9.2 mph) surfaced and 50 nautical miles (93 km; 58 mi) at 3 knots (5.6 km/h; 3.5 mph) submerged. The class was armed with four torpedoes carried externally in Drzewiecki drop collars and one machine gun. Vessels of the class had a complement of 24.

=== Modifications ===
In 1906–1907, new conning towers were installed aboard the submarines to rectify buoyancy issues. In 1910, the Kasatka class were rebuilt with new power plants. They received a diesel-electric system which included a diesel engine rated at 89 kilowatts (120 bhp). The displacement of the submarines increased to 155 tonnes (153 long tons) surfaced and 189 tonnes (186 long tons) submerged. Two of the class, Nalim and Skat, were given a 47 mm (1.9 in) gun in 1915.

== Ships ==
Kasatka-class submarines
Name	Builder	Launched	Completed	Fate
Kasatka (Касатка)	Baltic Works, St. Petersburg	1904	March 1905	Broken up 1922
Keta (ex Feldmarshal Graf Sheremetev)	Baltic Works, St. Petersburg	1904	May 1905	Broken up 1922
Makrel (Макрель)	Baltic Works, St. Petersburg	1907	1907	Broken up 1922
Nalim (Налим)	Baltic Works, St. Petersburg	8 September 1904	May 1905	Scuttled at Sevastopol 26 April 1919
Okun (Окунь)	Baltic Works, St. Petersburg	1904	1907	Broken up 1922
Skat (Скат)	Baltic Works, St. Petersburg	1904	March 1905	Scuttled at Sevastopol 26 April 1919

== Service history ==
The first submarine of the class, Kasatka was ordered in the 1903 building programme on 2 January 1904, with the rest ordered as part of the 1904 Emergency Programme, with the next four ordered on 24 February 1904 and Feldmarshal General Sheremetev on 26 March 1904. Feldmarshal General Sheremetev was paid for by public subscription with the Sheremetev family as major donors. Due to the outbreak of the Russo-Japanese War, construction was accelerated on the submarines and only Kasatka ran sea trials. During trials, Kasatka had trouble during operation of the ballast tanks, steering gear and water entered the submarine through the main hatch when submerged. The latter problem was rectified by the addition of two floats attached to the aft casing first on Kasatka and then on the others. Kasatka was then transferred to Vladivostok by rail, followed by the rest between September and December 1904 with the exception of Makrel and Okun. Makrel and Okun remained in the west and were used as evaluation boats for the design. Kasatka and Skat became operational in March 1905, followed by Feldmarshal General Sheremetev and Nalim in May 1905. Completion of Makrel and Okun took until 1907. At Vladivostok, the submarines were used as a deterrent against Japanese warships. They operated out to 150 nautical miles (280 km; 170 mi) from the coast and remained as visible as possible, remaining at sea for up to five days, though some patrols lasted two weeks. Upon completion Makrel and Okun were assigned to the 1st Division of the Baltic Fleet.

During World War I, Nalim and Skat were transferred to the Black Sea in 1915 and joined the Black Sea Fleet. That same year, Feldmarshal General Sheremetev and Kasatka were transferred to the Baltic Sea and joined the Baltic Fleet. In June 1915, Okun and Makrel were among the submarines deployed off the Kurland coast. Okun engaged the German cruiser SMS Augsburg, but missed. However, the submarine threat led the German command to withdraw their ships from around Windau. In August, the two submarines were ordered to the Gulf of Riga as part of the Russian attempt to defend against the German High Seas Fleet's movements in the area. Following the arrival of British submarine reinforcements, the smaller Russian submarines were deployed on coastal defence missions in the Baltic. After the entry of the Romania into the war on the side of the Allies in 1916, Nalim and Skat were based at Batumi but remained relatively inactive. Kasatka and Feldmarshal General Sheremetev transferred to Arkhangelsk in 1915 and 1916 respectively, arriving via inland waterways. In 1917, the two submarines were sent back to the Baltic for overhaul.

In March 1917, Nalim and Skat were removed from service. In August 1917, Feldmarshal General Sheremetev was renamed Keta. In 1918, Kasatka, Makrel and Okun were transferred to the Caspian Sea. In April 1918, Nalim and Skat were re-activated and used against the Soviets. After the Treaty of Brest-Litovsk was signed ending the Russian participation in World War I, they briefly flew the flag of the Ukrainian State before the Germans seized Nalim and Skat. In November 1918, following the Armistice of 11 November 1918 which ended World War I, the British took over the submarines after the German Empire surrendered. The two subs were later scuttled by the British at Sevastopol to prevent their capture by the Soviets during the Russian Civil War. The surviving boats were broken up for scrap in 1922.
