= List of ships sunk by torpedoes after 1945 =

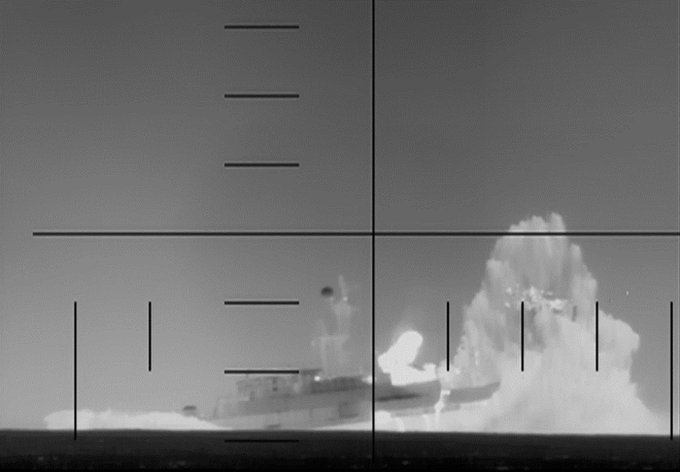
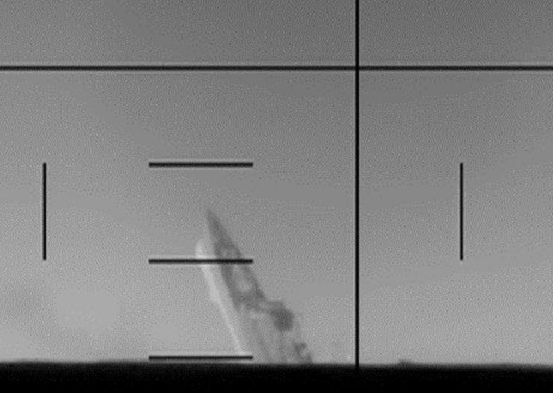
IRIS Dena at the moment of impact by a torpedo (left) and shortly after (right) through the periscope of USS Charlotte (SSN-766), which fired the torpedo. Dena sank within 2-3 minutes with 104 of 136 hands.

Many ships were sunk by torpedoes in World War I and World War II (in the Pacific War and Battle of the Atlantic), but very few torpedoes have been used in conflicts since 1945, making each individual usage more exceptional. Technical advances have vastly increased torpedo lethality since World War II, so the decline in torpedo usage likely reflects less warfare between near-peer adversaries.

== Warships ==
Ship	Type	National affiliation	Date	Conflict	Torpedo	Vector	National affiliation	Notes
Khukri	Frigate	India	9 December 1971	India–Pakistan war of 1971	Unspecified	Hangor	Pakistan	
General Belgrano	Cruiser	Argentina	2 May 1982	Falklands War	Mark VIII	Conqueror	United Kingdom	Sinking of ARA General Belgrano
Mukos	Patrol boat	Yugoslavia	14 November 1991	Battle of the Dalmatian Channels	Improvised	Naval commandos	Croatia	(Note: Two engineers built the improvised guided torpedo from various spare parts including an outboard motor, a chicken feeder, a radio battery, and sewer pipe. The sunken patrol boat was repaired for service with the Croatian Navy under the name Šolta.)
Cheonan	Corvette	South Korea	22 March 2010	Korean conflict	Allegedly a CHT-02D	An unknown submarine	North Korea	ROKS Cheonan sinking
Dena	Frigate	Iran	4 March 2026	2026 Iran war	Mark 48	Charlotte	United States	Sinking of IRIS Dena

== Civilian vessels ==
Ship	Type	National affiliation	Date	Conflict	Torpedo	Vector	National affiliation	Notes
Transit	Coaster	Lebanon	16 June 1982	1982 Lebanon War	Unspecified	Gal class	Israel	(Note: The boat was carrying 54 refugees and foreign workers to Cyprus, of which 25 died in the attack. The captain of the Israeli submarine testified that he saw over 30 uniformed soldiers and no women or children on board. The Israeli Defense Forces investigated the attack ten years after it occurred, and military censorship prevented public reporting until 2018.)
