= Sinking of IRIS Dena =

2026 Iran war sinking of Iranian ship

- Part of the 2026 Iran war
- Unclassified video of IRIS Dena being hit by a Mk-48 torpedo
Date	4 March 2026 c. 05:08–05:10 SLST (23:38–23:40 GMT) (Note: The day before.)
Location	19 nmi (35 km; 22 mi) off Galle, Sri Lanka 6.0073°N 79.8654°E (Note: Approximate sinking location based on oil spill)
Result	American victory

Belligerents
United States	Iran

Units involved
United States Navy; USS Charlotte	Islamic Republic of Iran Navy; IRIS Dena

Strength
1 Los Angeles-class submarine	1 Moudge-class frigate

Casualties and losses
None	IRIS Dena sunk 104 killed (including 20 missing); 32 rescued
- Location within Sri Lanka

During the 2026 Iran war, the Iranian Navy frigate IRIS Dena was torpedoed and sunk by the United States Navy's Los Angeles-class submarine USS Charlotte in the Indian Ocean. A week prior to the attack, Dena concluded its participation in the International Fleet Review 2026, a naval exercise hosted by India, and was returning home when it was attacked and sunk in international waters approximately 19 nautical miles (35 km; 22 mi) off the coast of Sri Lanka. On 4 March, Charlotte fired two Mark 48 torpedoes at Dena, which struck the frigate and caused its sinking. According to some reports, the vessel, owing to its participation in the international exercise, was not carrying operational armaments at the time. Also, the vessel's Bell 212 helicopter was not present during the incident. At the time of the attack Dena had a crew of 136 personnel; 104 were reported killed and 32 survived. It was further reported that the remains of 20 of the deceased were not recovered.

The sinking occurred amid heightened hostilities involving 2026 Iran war. It has been described as the only instance since the Pacific War of World War II in which a United States Navy submarine sank a surface vessel using torpedoes, and the first ever known torpedo kill on an enemy vessel by an American nuclear submarine. More broadly, it was the first sinking of an enemy surface ship by a nuclear-powered submarine since the sinking of ARA General Belgrano by the Royal Navy submarine HMS Conqueror during the Falklands War.

The attack is the subject of controversy and claims that it constituted a war crime related to whether an unarmed warship is a lawful target, the legality of the war in general, and whether or to what extent the submarine had an obligation to assist or ensure assistance to the shipwrecked crew under the Second Geneva Convention.

== Background ==
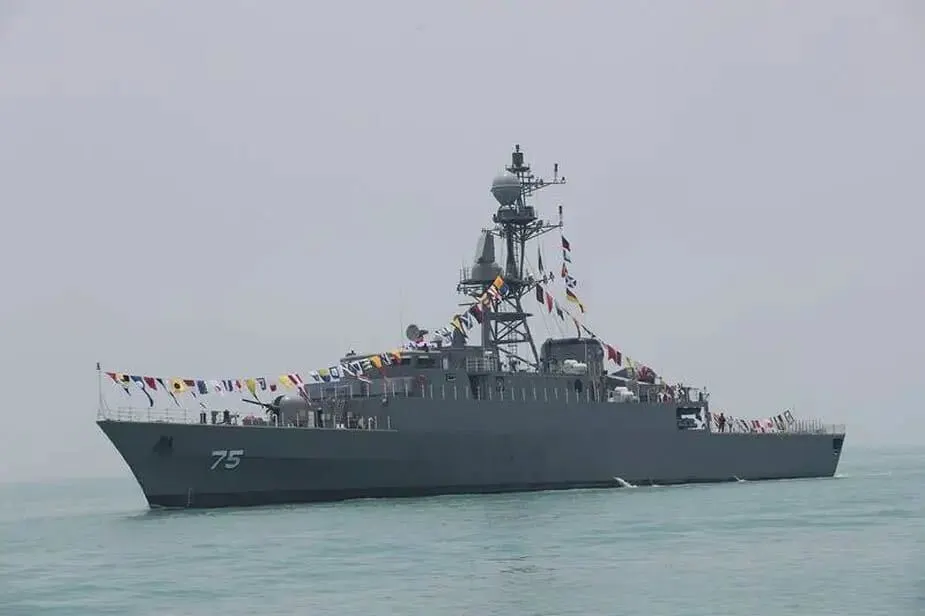
IRIS Dena dressed overall

IRIS Dena was a Moudge-class frigate launched in 2015, and was commissioned into the Iran Navy in 2021. The ship had an armament of surface-to-air and anti-ship missiles, torpedoes, and was equipped with several guns and cannons. However, the ship was reportedly unarmed or lightly armed at the time because of its participation in the International Fleet Review which required its participants to not carry any ammunition. The United States also attended and may have been aware that the ship was unarmed or lightly armed. However, the United States Indo-Pacific Command has denied that Dena was unarmed.

The vessel participated in the International Fleet Review 2026 and the multinational naval exercise Milan held at Visakhapatnam from 15 to 25 February 2026. Crew members had also embarked on a cultural visit of India, visiting the Taj Mahal and Kailasagiri as well as participating in a city parade. On 26 February, the Iranian embassy in Sri Lanka requested a "goodwill visit" for Dena and two other ships starting March 9. Sri Lanka was considering the request taking into account the US military buildup against Iran. As U.S.–Israeli airstrikes began on targets within Iran on 28 February, Sri Lankan government told Iran that they would allow ships at war to dock only in cases of emergency, following the precept of Hague Conventions of 1899 and 1907 about neutral powers. Indian foreign minister S. Jaishankar said that Iranian ships present in the Indian Ocean had then requested the Indian Navy for docking at the Port of Kochi. It is not clear why Dena continued to try to dock in Sri Lanka till March 3.

== Naval action ==
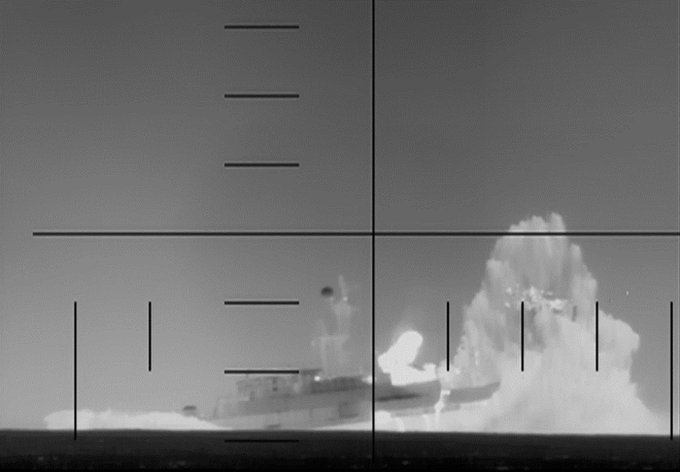
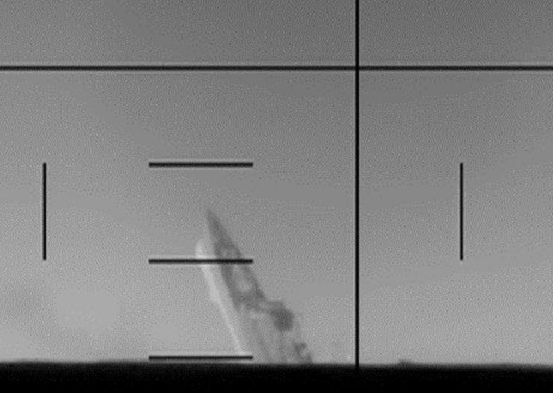
Footage of IRIS Dena being struck (left) and sinking later (right), as released by the US Department of Defense

Dena was sunk in the early morning of 4 March 2026. A U.S. official stated that the United States did not provide a warning prior to carrying out the strike. According to the Sri Lankan Ministry of Foreign Affairs, Dena issued a distress call at 05:08 SLST, reporting an explosion, prompting an immediate search and rescue operation by the Sri Lanka Navy and Sri Lanka Air Force. The ship was returning to Iran from India, and was about 19 nautical miles (35 km; 22 mi) off the coast from Galle, Sri Lanka, in international waters, when the attack occurred. The ship sank within 2-3 minutes of the attack.

Hegseth states: "...[Dena] thought it was safe in international waters. Instead, it was sunk by a torpedo. Quiet death."

During a briefing at The Pentagon, U.S. Secretary of Defense Pete Hegseth confirmed that Dena had been sunk by a US Navy submarine. Other government officials specified that the submarine was USS Charlotte, which fired two Mark 48 torpedoes and hit Dena.

Hegseth, commenting on the engagement, stated: "[Dena] thought it was safe in international waters. Instead, it was sunk by a torpedo. Quiet death." Australian Prime Minister Anthony Albanese later confirmed that three Royal Australian Navy personnel were on board the submarine.

This was the first instance of a nuclear-powered submarine sinking an enemy surface vessel since the sinking of ARA General Belgrano by the Royal Navy nuclear submarine HMS Conqueror during the Falklands War. It is the first such naval action by a US Navy submarine since the Pacific theater of World War II.

=== Rescue efforts ===
At the time of the incident, there were approximately 136 military personnel on board the frigate, including members of the Iranian Navy band. Reports indicate that 104 military personnel were killed in the attack, a figure that includes 20 individuals who are missing.

The United States Indo-Pacific Command stated that U.S. forces had planned for life-saving support to survivors in accordance with the Law of Armed Conflict that Sri Lanka then provided. Sri Lankan authorities state they only received a distress signal from the IRIS Dena. Thirty-two survivors were rescued by the Sri Lanka Navy and transported to the Galle National Hospital, where they received medical treatment for exhaustion and injuries related to the blast.

According to an official press release by the Indian Navy, they were notified in the early hours by the Sri Lanka Navy of the distress call to the Maritime Rescue and Coordination Centre (MRCC) Colombo. India thereafter deployed INS Tarangini and INS Ikshak from Kochi – both IFR 2026 participants – as well as its P-8I Neptune long-range maritime patrol aircraft to search for survivors that evening. The P-8I was launched at 10:00 IST along with another aircraft equipped with air-droppable life rafts to support the search operations being led by the Sri Lankan authorities. Tarangini reached the designated search area by 16:00 IST but the Sri Lanka Navy and agencies had already begun operations.

The Indian Navy ships terminated their search on 6 March. The Sri Lanka Navy and Indian patrol aircraft ended search operations on 8 March.

== Aftermath ==
=== Crew ===
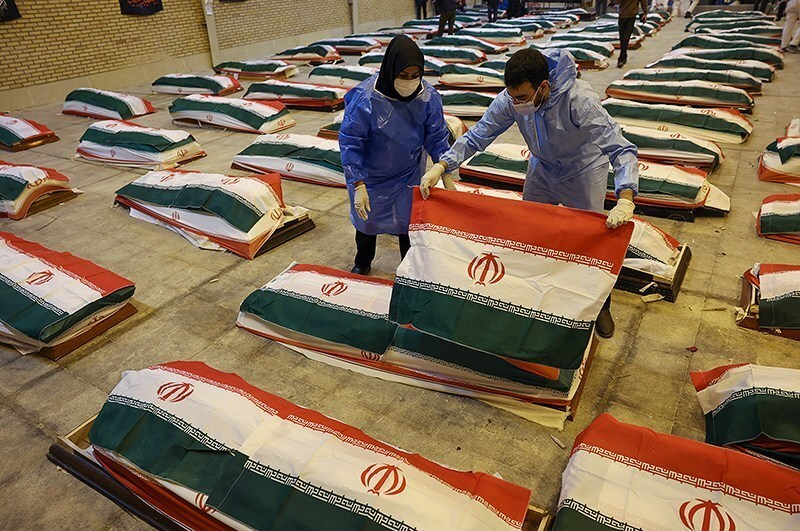
The arrival of the bodies from the Dena sinking in Behesht-e Zahra

The Sri Lanka Navy recovered 84 bodies of Iranian sailors. They were taken to Galle National Hospital. The Iranian authorities have requested Sri Lanka to hand over all the bodies of the sailors who died in the attack on board IRIS Dena so they can be repatriated for final rites. Until arrangements are made, the remains will be stored in the hospital's cold rooms. The residents of Visakhapatnam who had hosted the crew during MILAN-26 also expressed their anguish and concern for the well-being of the crew. The remains of 45 crewmembers who were killed were handed over to the Iranian embassy in Sri Lanka and repatriated to Iran via Mattala airport by 13 March while the survivors were sent to a Sri Lankan airbase at Koggala.

The survivors were repatriated to Iran on 14 April 2026 during the ceasefire period between the US and Iran.

=== Iran ===
The government of Iran has called the attack "an atrocity at sea."

After the sinking of IRIS Dena, a second Iranian ship, IRIS Bushehr of the Bandar Abbas class, requested to enter Colombo port. The Sri Lankan government stated that Sri Lanka will act under international conventions, including the 1982 UN Convention on the Law of the Sea to take custodianship of IRIS Bushehr. The ship was later interned by the Sri Lanka Navy with its crew of 208. This is the first instance of a warship being interned in a neutral country since World War II. The crew members of IRIS Bushehr, consisting of 53 officers, 84 cadet officers, 48 senior sailors and 23 sailors, were transferred to Colombo and the ship was moved to Trincomalee Harbour by the Sri Lanka Navy.

It was also reported that the landing ship IRIS Lavan with a crew of 183 sailors had sought refuge and been interned at Kochi, India late evening on 4 March, following the attack on Dena. The United States had urged Sri Lanka not to repatriate IRIS Dena survivors and IRIS Bushehr crew back to Iran so that Iran could not use them for propaganda. It also asked Sri Lanka if there were any attempts made to encourage defection among crew members. The ship also emerged as a public curiosity in Kochi. On 7 March, the Indian government said it had allowed IRIS Lavan to dock at Kochi on humanitarian grounds.

=== United States ===
The incident sparked debate regarding whether U.S. forces leaving the scene without attempting to rescue survivors contravened international law, specifically the Second Geneva Convention. Academics who believe the submarine's actions were legal argue that the attack was permitted due to the ongoing military conflict between Iran and the United States; and that, due to the lack of space within a submarine and risks of surfacing, submarines have been regarded as generally not having an obligation to engage in rescue operations with the possible exception of ensuring others have been notified to attempt rescue by either the ship itself or it's attacker. Initial speculation was that the US notified Sri Lanka given the quick rescue response, but Sri Lanka reported only receiving the ship's own distress signal. U.S. Indo-Pacific Command tweeted out that the ship was armed, it was destruction of a valid military target, and had planned for Sri Lankan rescue operations in accordance with international law.

Others who believe the submarine's actions were illegal, argue that the submarine had an obligation to do what it could to save the crews' lives, and that the attack raises questions about the broader conflict's legality due to an expansion outside of imminent threats to the US. The sinking may also send signals to China that their Middle Eastern energy shipments through the Indian Ocean would be vulnerable to interdiction. On July 21, 2026 the acting Secretary of the Navy Hung Cao awarded the Navy Unit Commendation to the crew of the USS Charlotte stating, “The most powerful weapons in our Navy are often the ones never seen—and never heard. This recognition reflects their professionalism, discipline, and unwavering dedication to the mission.”

This debate follows the string of controversial statements made by the Trump-led Oval Office, with Pete Hegseth voicing disdain for past international laws, stating that there would be “no stupid rules of engagement..." and Donald Trump himself recounting the incident during a White House press conference - where he allegedly questioned military officials as to why they didn't simply capture IRIS Dena instead. Trump stated that the response was that "It's more fun to sink them", prompting laughter from himself and his cabinet, which drew further public backlash and has been described by political commentators as treating the war as a "spectacle" instead of a serious engagement.

=== Australia ===
On 6 March, Australian Prime Minister Anthony Albanese acknowledged that three Australian Defence Force personnel were aboard the US submarine that sank IRIS Dena. He said that the Australian personnel were on board the submarine as part of a training rotation for the AUKUS security partnership, under which the United States will supply nuclear submarines to Australia. Albanese stated that Australian personnel did not participate in any "offensive action" against Iran.

=== India ===
On 4 March 2026, Indian strategic affairs analyst Brahma Chellaney stated that the U.S. Navy's sinking of IRIS Dena in India's "maritime neighbourhood" was "more than a battlefield event; it is a strategic embarrassment for New Delhi." Chellaney argued that by attacking a vessel returning from an Indian-hosted exercise, Washington transformed India's maritime neighbourhood into a "war zone," thereby challenging India's authority and its reputation as the preferred security partner in the Indian Ocean. Indian opposition parties also criticised the government's stand on the sinking.

India's former chief of naval staff, Admiral Arun Prakash, considered the attack shocking in multiple ways. He said "It’s a bit of treachery of the US to attend a peaceful function side-by-side with Iranian navy, where there’s a lot of camaraderie, and then the moment the Iranian ship pops out of harbour, it’s sunk ... They could have delayed this action to spare India this embarrassment." He also said that targeting a guest of India that posed no immediate threat "leaves a very bad taste in my mouth".

== See also ==
- List of ships sunk by torpedoes after 1945
