= Timothy McClement =

Vice Admiral Sir Timothy McClement KCB OBE
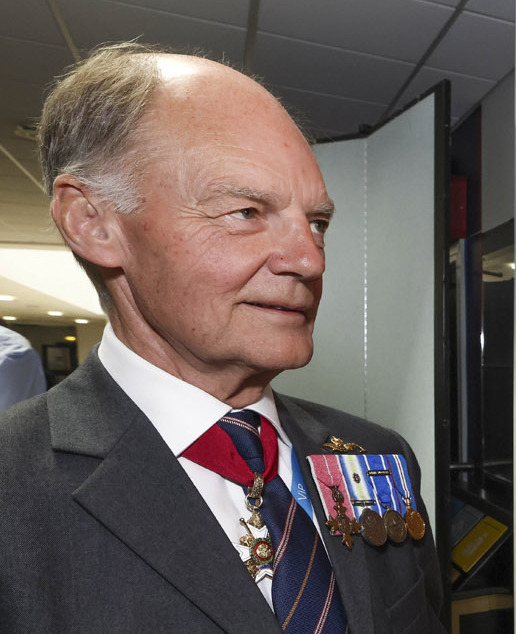
- McClement in 2022
- Born: 16 May 1951 (age 75)
- Military career
- Allegiance: United Kingdom
- Branch: Royal Navy
- Service years: 1971–2006
- Rank: Vice Admiral
- Commands: 2nd Frigate Squadron; HMS Cornwall; HMS London; HMS Tireless; HMS Opportune
- Conflicts: Falklands War
- Awards: Knight Commander of the Order of the Bath; Officer of the Order of the British Empire

Vice Admiral Sir Timothy Pentreath McClement, KCB, OBE (born 16 May 1951) is a former Royal Navy officer who served as Deputy Commander-in-Chief Fleet from 2004 to 2006.

== Naval career ==
Educated at Douai School and the Royal Naval College, Dartmouth, McClement joined the Royal Navy in 1971. He served as a submariner in the Falklands War and was second-in-command of the nuclear-powered hunter killer submarine HMS Conqueror and oversaw the attack on the Belgrano on 2 May 1982.

McClement became commanding officer of the submarine HMS Opportune in 1983, staff captain submarine sea training in 1985 and commanding officer of the Submarine Commander's Qualifying Course in 1987. He was appointed commanding officer of the submarine HMS Tireless in 1989, commanding officer of the frigate HMS London in 1992, a staff officer on the Directorate of Naval Staff Duties at the Ministry of Defence in 1994 and officer responsible for setting up the Plans Division at Permanent Joint Headquarters in 1996. He went on to be deputy flag officer submarines in 1997, commanding officer of the frigate HMS Cornwall as well as captain of the 2nd Frigate Squadron in 1999 and assistant chief of the naval staff in 2001. His last appointments were as chief of staff (warfare) to the Commander-in-Chief Fleet in 2003 and Deputy Commander-in-Chief Fleet in 2004 before retiring in 2006.

In retirement McClement became chairman of the Royal Navy Submarine Museum at Gosport.

Military offices
Preceded by James Burnell-Nugent	Assistant Chief of the Naval Staff; 2001–2003	Succeeded by Adrian Johns
Preceded by Sir Mark Stanhope	Deputy Commander-in-Chief Fleet; 2004–2006	Succeeded by Paul Boissier
