= ARA Nueve de Julio (C-5) =

Argentine Navy cruiser (1951–1978)

History

Argentina
- Name: Nueve de Julio
- Namesake: 9 July 1816, the date of Argentine Independence
- Acquired: 11 January 1951
- Fate: Scrapped in 1983

General characteristics
- Class & type: Brooklyn-class cruiser
- Displacement: 9,700 tons
- Length: 608 ft 4 in (185.42 m)
- Beam: 61 ft 9 in (18.82 m)
- Draft: 24 ft (7.3 m)
- Speed: 33.5 knots (62.0 km/h)
- Complement: 868 officers and men
- Armament: 15 × 6 in (152 mm); 8 × 5 in (127 mm) guns

ARA Nueve de Julio (C-5) was an Argentine Navy cruiser, purchased from the United States Navy on 11 January 1951. Nueve de Julio was decommissioned in 1978 and sent to Japan to be scrapped.

== Early career ==
ARA Nueve de Julio (C-5) was built as USS Boise in 1936 by Newport News Shipbuilding and Dry Dock Company, Newport News, Virginia. Boise was a Brooklyn-class light cruiser, named for the city of Boise, the capital of Idaho. She served in World War II in the Pacific theater before decommissioning on 11 July 1946.

== Argentine career ==
Boise was sold to the Argentine Navy on 11 January 1951. During her service in the Argentine Navy, she participated in the 1955 Revolución Libertadora, when 9 de Julio shelled oil depots and military facilities in the city of Mar del Plata, along with a flotilla of destroyers, on 19 September 1955. She was accidentally rammed by her sister General Belgrano (former USS Phoenix) during an exercise on 15 March 1956, which resulted in damage to both cruisers. 9 de Julio was withdrawn from active service in May 1971 and spent her last years moored at the Puerto Belgrano Naval Base. By the mid 1970s, the vessel was in a state of decay and abandonment.

From March 1976 and until at least December of that year the rat-infested hull was set up as a clandestine detention center. A number of cabins were converted into cells in which disappeared persons were temporarily held for periods ranging from days to months, while torture sessions took place at the headquarters of the Naval Establishments Police. At least one baby was born in captivity inside the ship, its fate remaining a mystery.

Nueve de Julio was struck on 31 October 1977 and sold on 28 June 1981, with the manifesto stating that she was to be moored at Brownsville, Texas and converted into a museum ship. Instead, she was towed to Japan and scrapped for metal there in 1983. General Belgrano remained in service until her sinking during the Falklands War by the British submarine HMS Conqueror.

== See also ==
- List of cruisers
- List of ships of the Argentine Navy
