= IRIS Dena =

Iranian Moudge-class frigate sunk by US Submarine action

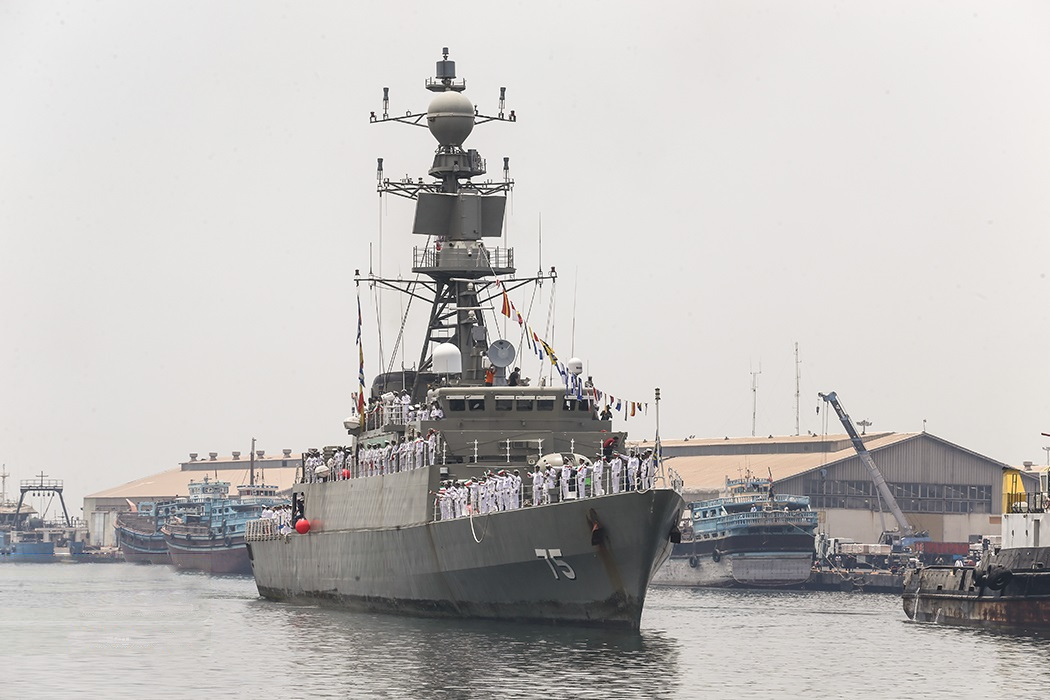
- Dena in 2023

History

Iran
- Name: Dena
- Namesake: Dena
- Builder: Iranian Navy's Factories, Bandar Abbas
- Laid down: 2012
- Launched: 2015
- Sponsored by: Ali Khamenei
- Commissioned: 2021
- Home port: Bandar-Abbas
- Identification: Pennant number: 75; Code letters: EQAH
- Fate: Torpedoed and sunk on 4 March 2026

General characteristics
- Class & type: Moudge-class frigate
- Displacement: 1,500 tonnes
- Length: 95 m (311 ft 8 in)
- Beam: 11.1 m (36 ft 5 in) estimated
- Draught: 3.25 m (10 ft 8 in) estimated
- Propulsion: 4 × 5,000 hp (3,700 kW) diesel engines; 4 diesel generators; 4 x 740 hp (550 kW)
- Speed: 30 kn (56 km/h; 35 mph)
- Complement: 140
- Sensors & processing systems: Asr 3D PESA radar
- Electronic warfare & decoys: Unknown EW
- Armament: 1 × 76 mm DP rapid fire auto-cannon; 1 × Fath 40 mm AA cannon; Bofors copy; 4 × SSMs C-802 / Noor; 2 × crew-served 20 mm cannons Oerlikon; 2 × triple 324 mm light torpedoes; 2 × Sayad-2 SAMs; 2 × chaff dispensers
- Aircraft carried: 1 × Bell 212 ASW helicopter
- Aviation facilities: Helipad

IRIS Dena (75) (Persian: ناوشکن دنا) was a Moudge-class frigate in the Southern Fleet of the Islamic Republic of Iran Navy. She was named after Mount Dena, and was commissioned into the navy in 2021.

She was sunk on 4 March 2026 during the 2026 Iran war by the Los Angeles-class submarine USS Charlotte of the United States Navy in international waters near the southern coast of Sri Lanka.

She was the only ship to be sunk in active combat by a submarine since 1982, when the Argentine Navy cruiser ARA General Belgrano was sunk by torpedoes from the Royal Navy nuclear submarine HMS Conqueror during the Falklands War, and the only to be sunk by an American submarine since the Pacific theater of World War II. (Note: In 2010, South Korean corvette ROKS Cheonan was sunk near the border with North Korea. An investigation into the incident by a group of countries concluded that it was sunk by a torpedo launched by a North Korean Yeono-class midget submarine, though North Korea denied any responsibility.)

== Description ==
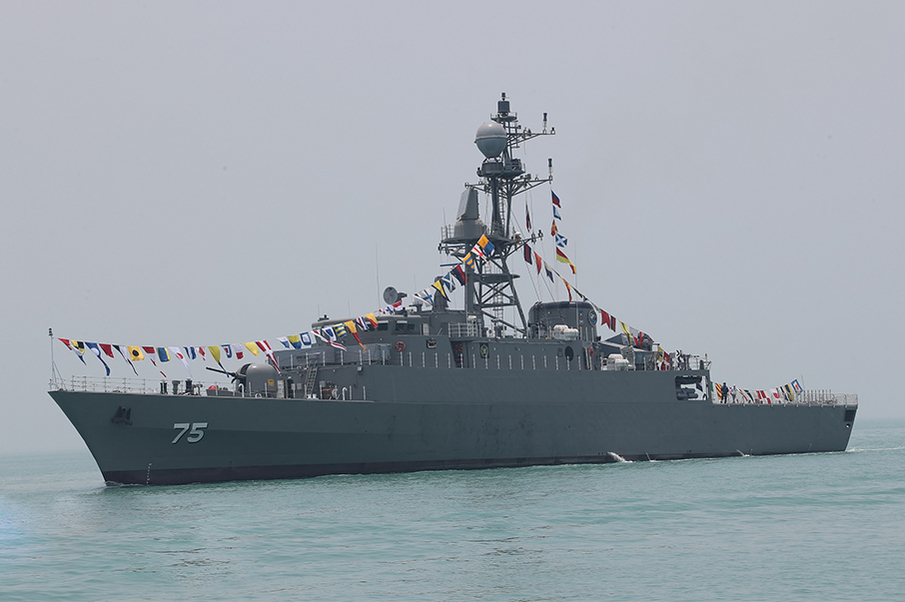
Dena during her commissioning in 2021

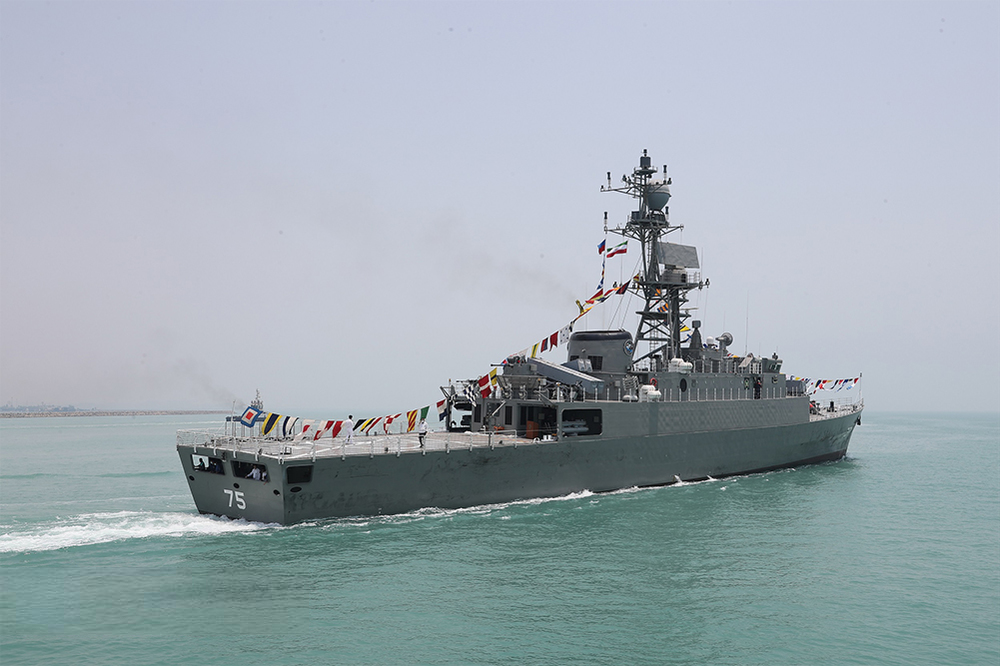
Rear view of IRIS Dena

Dena was a Moudge-class frigate, described as both a destroyer and frigate by the English media, and was known as a novshekan (ناوشکن) in Persian, which translates to "destroyer". The ship was 94 m (308 ft 5 in)–long, 11 m (36 ft 1 in)–wide, and displaced about 1,300 to 1,500 tons. Similar to other ships of her class, she had a landing pad to host a helicopter.

Dena was the first Iranian ship equipped with the Iranian "Bonyan 4" engines. She had four engines, each generating 5,000 hp (3,700 kW) for a total power of 20,000 hp (15,000 kW). She had a bow thruster system for increased maneuverability. She was equipped with an Asr phased array radar.

=== Armament ===
As per Iranian Navy Commander Hossein Khanzadi, the ship carried a significantly greater armament compared with the frigates of the same class. According to declarations from 2019, Dena was to be equipped with a vertical launching system, a first for an Iranian ship. However, the ship was eventually equipped with two Sayyad missiles and photographs show two container launchers before a bridge, like on earlier ships. The ship was equipped with surface-to-air and anti-ship missiles. She had an armament of four Ghader anti-ship missiles, a 76 mm Fajr-27 naval gun, a 40 mm Fath-40 AA cannon, two 20 mm Oerlikon cannons, two 12.7 mm heavy machine guns, and two triple 324 mm anti-submarine torpedo launchers. At the time of her sinking, however, Dena was reportedly unarmed according to the protocol of a naval exercise hosted by India, which she had just visited.

== Service history ==
Dena was launched in 2015, and was commissioned into the Iran Navy in 2021. In 2022–2023, Dena and IRIS Makran of the 86th naval fleet performed the 360-Degree mission around the world, a historic mission for the Iranian Navy.

In February 2026, Dena participated at the International Fleet Review 2026 held at the Indian port of Visakhapatnam. Following the Fleet Review on 18 February, the ship docked at the Indian port on 20 February. On the same day, the Commander of the Iranian Navy, Commodore Shahram Irani, who was on a visit to India for participating in various events including the Fleet Review, Indian Ocean Naval Symposium and the 2026 Milan exercise, met the Indian Chief of the Naval Staff, Admiral Dinesh K Tripathi.

=== Sinking ===
Dena being torpedoed by USS Charlotte

On 4 March 2026, amid the 2026 Iran war, Dena transmitted a distress call at 05:08 hrs (UTC+05:30), 19 nautical miles (35 km; 22 mi) off the coast from Galle, Sri Lanka, prompting an immediate search and rescue operation by the Sri Lanka Navy and Sri Lanka Air Force. The ship sank before the Sri Lanka Navy could reach the area. The Sri Lanka Navy rescued 32 sailors, who were sent to the Galle National Hospital. Later, the Sri Lanka Navy recovered the bodies of 87 sailors.

The United States confirmed on 4 March that Dena had been sunk by USS Charlotte. She fired two Mark 48 torpedoes, of which one hit Dena. The ship became the only one to be sunk by an American submarine since the Pacific theater of World War II. The warship was reportedly unarmed at the time of the incident.
