= Karapitiya =

Karapitiya (Sinhala: කරාපිටිය) is a suburb of Galle in the Southern Province of Sri Lanka. It is located within the limits of Galle Four Gravets.

== Local facilities ==
Karapitiya has the Galle National Hospital, a notable tertiary care hospital in the country, which serves as the main clinical training institute Faculty of Medicine of University of Ruhuna.. In terms of private hospitals, the Ruhunu Hospital is located next to the medical faculty as well as the channeling center of Galle Cooperative hospital.

There are a number of roads in Karapitiya, including the Hirimbura Cross Road, Anagarika Dharmapala Mawatha (Browns Road), Peter Kiringoda Mawatha, Maitipe First, Second and Third lanes, Hirimbura Road, H. K. Edmand Road (Morris Road) and Labuduwa Road.

Recently It has achieved a fast development with newly established branches of all of the famous banks in Sri Lanka;

- Bank of Ceylon
- People's Bank
- Sampath Bank
- National Savings Bank
- Hatton National Bank
- Nations Trust Bank
- Commercial Bank of Ceylon
- Sanasa Development Bank
- Regional Development Bank
- Seylan Bank

Supermarkets;

- Cargills Food City
- Abeywickrama Food City [AFC]
- Keells Super

Lifestyle Showroom ;

- Electro Enterprises

== Religious places and History ==
The temple which is known as Purana Sunandaramaya is situated in front of the hospital. Sri Sudharmaramaya is a famous ancient temple located at Maitipe, Karapitiya. Sri Dheerananada Dhamma School located there serves the society.

== Public Transport ==
=== Bus Services ===
There are several routes heading to/from Galle to/from Karapitiya and also via Karapitiya.
