= Diana Gould =

Diana Gould may refer to:

- Diana Gould (dancer) (1912–2003), British ballerina and occasional actress and singer
- Diana Gould (teacher) (1926–2011), British teacher known for an exchange with Margaret Thatcher in 1983
- Diana Gould (writer) (born 1944), screenwriter for television and short story author
