= HMS Cornwall (F99) =

1988 Type 22 or Broadsword-class frigate of the Royal Navy

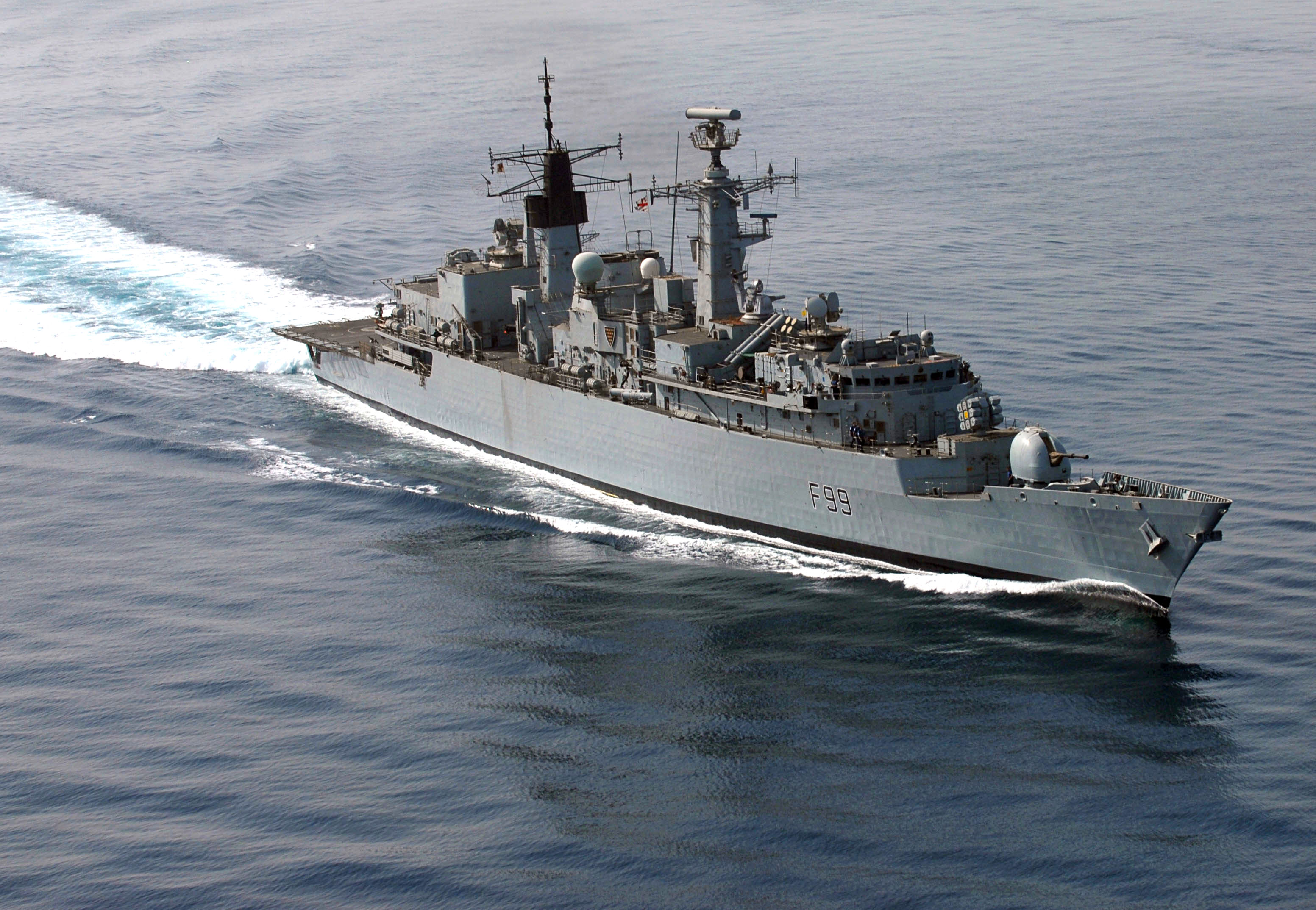
- HMS Cornwall in the Persian Gulf

History

United Kingdom
- Name: HMS Cornwall
- Operator: Royal Navy
- Builder: Yarrow Shipbuilders
- Laid down: 14 December 1983
- Launched: 14 October 1985
- Sponsored by: Diana, Princess of Wales
- Commissioned: 23 April 1988
- Decommissioned: 30 June 2011
- Home port: HMNB Devonport, Plymouth
- Identification: Pennant number: F99; IMO number: 4907115; International callsign: GDLU
- Motto: Unus et omnes; "One and all"
- Nickname(s): "The Fighting 99"; "Ice cream frigate"
- Fate: Scrapped October 2013
- Badge

General characteristics
- Class & type: Type 22 frigate
- Displacement: 5,300 tons
- Length: 148.1 m (485 ft 11 in)
- Beam: 14.8 m (48 ft 7 in)
- Draught: 6.4 m (21 ft 0 in)
- Propulsion: 2 × Rolls-Royce Spey gas turbines (high speed); 2 × Rolls-Royce Tyne gas turbines (cruising) COGAG
- Speed: 18 knots (33 km/h; 21 mph) (cruise); 30 knots (56 km/h; 35 mph) (maximum)
- Complement: 250 (max. 301)
- Sensors & processing systems: Type 1007 navigation radar; Type 967 and 968 surveillance radar; 2 × Type 911 Sea Wolf tracking radars; UAT Electronic Surveillance System Type 2050 active sonar
- Armament: 2 × Sea Wolf anti-air system (Total of 72 Sea Wolf missiles); 2 × Quad Harpoon missile launchers (total of 8 Harpoons); 2 × triple magazine launched anti-submarine torpedo tubes (total of 36 torpedoes); 1 × 4.5 in (114 mm) Mk.8 gun; 2 × 20 mm GAM-BO1 guns; 1 × Goalkeeper CIWS; NATO Seagnat Decoy Launchers
- Aircraft carried: 2 × Lynx Mk.8 helicopters (but only 1 Lynx in peacetime); Armed with; 4 × Sea Skua anti-ships missiles; 2 × Sting Ray anti-submarine torpedoes; 2 × Mk 11 depth charges; 2 × Machine guns

HMS Cornwall was a Batch 3 Type 22 frigate of the Royal Navy. She was the first Batch 3 to be built, and the last to be decommissioned. Cornwall was based at HMNB Devonport in Devon, England, part of the Devonport Flotilla.

She was built by Yarrow Shipbuilders and launched by Diana, Princess of Wales at Scotstoun on the River Clyde in October 1985 and commissioned at Falmouth in 1988 by the ship's sponsor, Diana, Princess of Wales (who was also the Duchess of Cornwall).

== Service ==
Originally lead ship (Captain F) of the Devonport-based 8th Frigate Squadron and upon its disbandment in 1993, lead ship of the 2nd Frigate Squadron, HMS Cornwall had battle honours from Barfleur in 1692, the Falkland Islands in 1914 and the Dardanelles in 1915.

Cornwall was affectionately dubbed "the Fighting Ice Cream" by her crew due to her pennant number of F99. She undertook duties in the North and South Atlantic Ocean, Adriatic, Mediterranean, Caribbean and Baltic Seas throughout her time in service, and completed several patrols to the Persian Gulf and deployments to the Far East.

During 1988 and 1989 she was commanded by Captain Chris Wreford-Brown.

In 1992 she deployed to the West Indies as West Indies Guard ship, visiting Bermuda, Tortola, Belize, The Bahamas, Pensacola, Key West and Curaçao before making her way home up the East Coast of the US and Canada via Norfolk, Boston and Halifax. In 1993 she deployed to the Gulf with a mid-deployment break to Mombasa in Kenya. 1994 saw her return again to the Gulf but this time visiting Singapore, Penang, Tioman Island and Sri Lanka whilst off station. En route back from the Far East, the ship took the opportunity to stop and lay a wreath at the site of the sinking of the previous HMS Cornwall, a County Class heavy cruiser sunk by Japanese dive bombers in April 1942.

Between 1996 and 1998 she was commanded by Captain Anthony Dymock.

In 1996 she served as flagship of the First Sea Lord in Saint Petersburg, during the 300th anniversary celebrations of the Russian Navy, followed by a period as flagship of NATO's Standing Naval Force Atlantic. In 2001 she was part of the Royal Navy Task Force engaged in the invasion of Afghanistan. In 2003 she was again committed to Standing Naval Force Atlantic, supporting Operation Active Endeavour in the Mediterranean

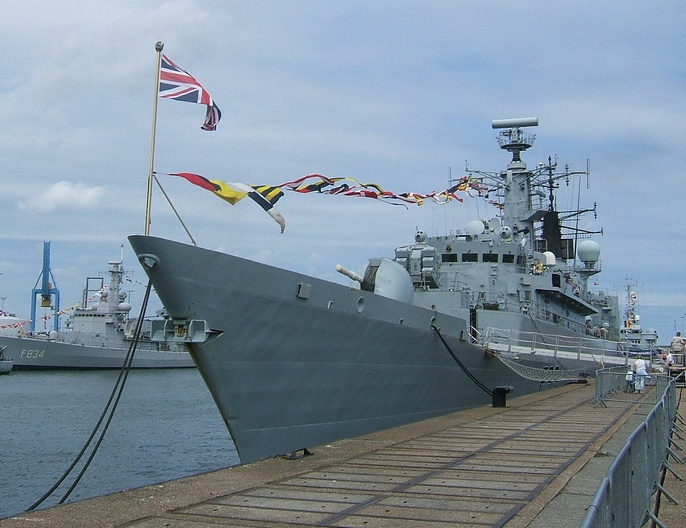
HMS Cornwall alongside and dressed overall at Zeebrugge, Belgium, July 2006

Following the death of the Princess of Wales in 1997, the role of sponsor was assumed by Mary Holborow, Lord Lieutenant of Cornwall.

Between 1999 and 2001 she was commanded by Captain Timothy McClement.

Ceremonial activities have included acting as flagship for the Battle of the Atlantic Fleet Review in 1993, commemorating the 50th anniversary of the Battle of the Atlantic, and in 2002 delivering a 21-gun salute as part of celebrations of the Golden Jubilee of Queen Elizabeth II.

On 28 January 2006 Cornwall was rededicated, following a period of docked maintenance, in a ceremony at Falmouth attended by Lady Mary Holborow.

On 23 March 2007, fifteen sailors and Royal Marines from HMS Cornwall were detained by elements of the Navy of the Army of the Guardians of the Islamic Revolution following a routine search of a vessel suspected of smuggling, in the vicinity of disputed territorial waters.

In February 2011, while operating in the Gulf of Aden as part of the Combined Maritime Forces, boarding teams from HMS Cornwall participated in the rescue of five Yemeni fishermen and the capture of 17 Somali pirates from a fishing dhow, which had been seized by pirates on 11 November 2010.

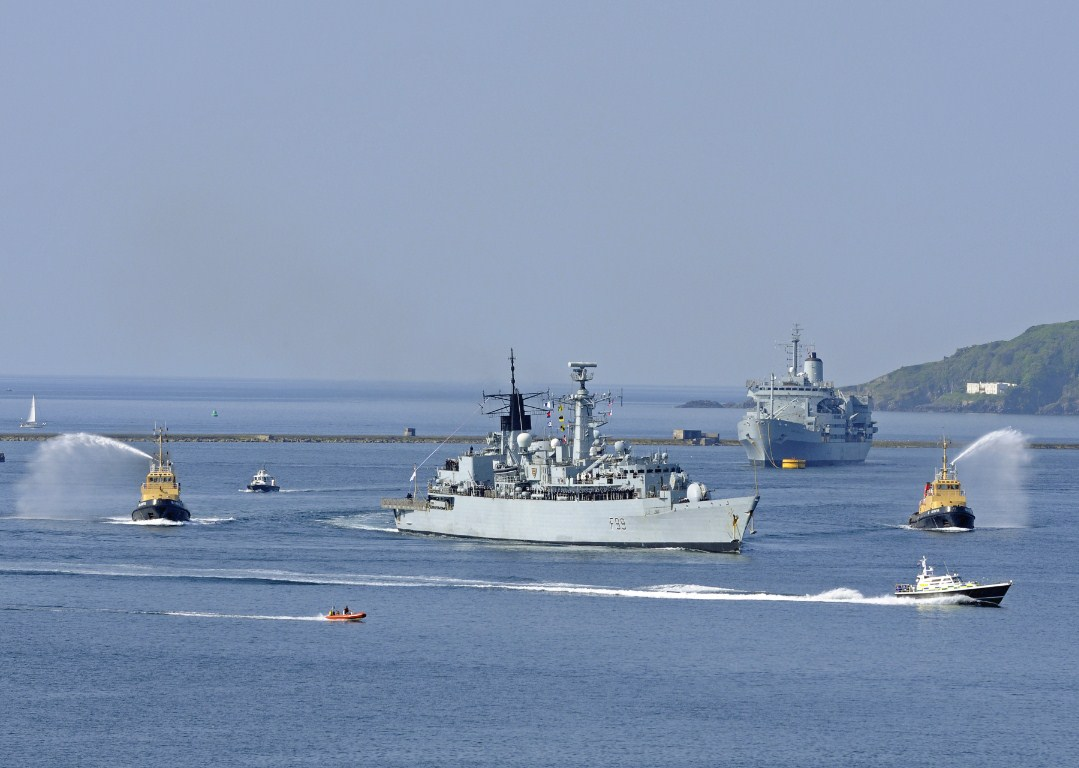
HMS Cornwall enters Devonport for the final time, 26 April 2011

== Decommissioning and disposal ==
On 26 April 2011 she returned to Plymouth for the last time, and decommissioned on 30 June 2011. Her decommissioning pennant was presented to the Davidstow Airfield and Cornwall at War Museum on 5 October 2011. The ship's bell was presented to Truro Cathedral on 18 October 2011.

She was later towed to HMNB Portsmouth, where she lay with sister ships HMS Cumberland, HMS Campbeltown, HMS Chatham. All four were put up for sale in January 2013 and in July HMS Cornwall was sold to Swansea Drydocks for demolition. She left Portsmouth, being towed to Swansea, on 24 October 2013.

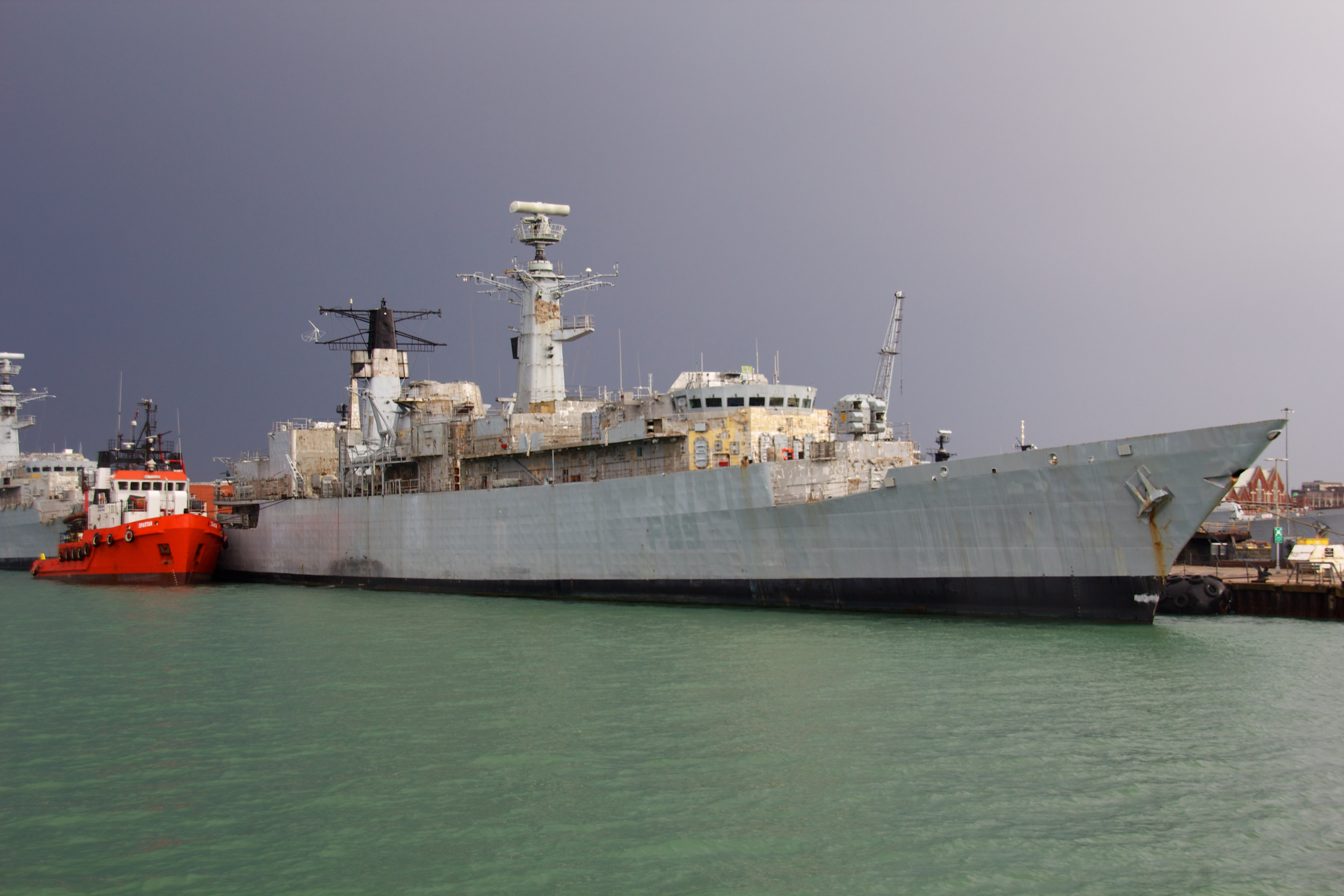
Cornwall in Portsmouth harbour prior to scrapping, October 2013

Should a future ship be named Cornwall, her ship's company will be able to visit Truro to revive the Royal Navy's links with the county and return the Bell to the county's affiliated ship.

== Affiliations ==
Cornwall was affiliated with a number of military and civilian organisations and bodies:

- County of Cornwall
- HMS Cornwall 1939-1942 Association
- 3rd Battalion The Rifles, formerly the 2nd Battalion, The Light Infantry
- Worshipful Company of Leathersellers
- Cornish Rugby Football Union
- TS St Petroc, Padstow
- TS Queen Charlotte, Guildford
- TS Pellow, Truro
- TS Robert Hitchens, Falmouth and Penryn
- 6th Falmouth Sea Scout Group
- CCF Colston's Collegiate, Bristol
- CCF Berkhamsted Collegiate School, Herts
- CCF Reed's School, Surrey
- Cornish Royal Naval Association
- Accenture
- 99 Squadron RAF
- Devon & Cornwall RNA Units.

== Publications ==
- Colledge, J. J.; Warlow, Ben (2006) [1969]. Ships of the Royal Navy: The Complete Record of All Fighting Ships of the Royal Navy from the 15th Century to the Present (3rd Rev ed.). London: Chatham Publishing. ISBN 978-1-86176-281-8. OCLC 67375475.
