= Chris Wreford-Brown =

British Royal Navy officer (born 1945)

Captain Chris Wreford-Brown DSO
- Born: August 1945 (age 81)
- Military career
- Allegiance: United Kingdom
- Branch: Royal Navy
- Service years: 1965–1996
- Rank: Captain
- Commands: HMS Opossum; HMS Conqueror; HMS Valiant; HMS Cornwall
- Conflicts: Falklands War
- Awards: Distinguished Service Order

Christopher Louis Wreford-Brown DSO (born August 1945) is a retired British Royal Navy officer.

== Falklands War ==
Wreford-Brown was captain of HM Submarine Conqueror during the Falklands War, during which Conqueror attacked and destroyed the Argentine Navy's cruiser the ARA General Belgrano. For the Falklands patrol he was awarded the Distinguished Service Order. He was the first of only two naval officers to have commanded a nuclear submarine which has sunk a warship in war operations. (The second was Thomas Futch of the US Navy, who commanded the USS Charlotte when that submarine sank the IRIN Dena on 4 March 2026, 44 years later.) When asked about the incident later, Wreford-Brown responded, "The Royal Navy spent thirteen years preparing me for such an occasion. It would have been regarded as extremely dreary if I had fouled it up."

== Operation Barmaid ==
In July 1982 Wreford-Brown captained HMS Conqueror in an operation during the Cold War in the Barents Sea, where it carried out a successful clandestine sub-surface raid to capture Soviet Navy hydrophonic sonar equipment from Warsaw Pact vessels upon the high sea for technical analysis by the North Atlantic Treaty Organization.

== Later naval career ==
Wreford-Brown became commanding officer of the frigate HMS Cornwall as well as Captain of 8th Frigate Squadron in 1988. His other commands include the diesel submarine HMS Opossum and the nuclear submarine HMS Valiant.

== Post-military career ==
Wreford-Brown retired from the Royal Navy in 1995 with the rank of Captain, and was employed as a Director of Paignton Zoo in Devon until his retirement in 2010.
