= Diana Gould–Margaret Thatcher exchange =

1983 BBC television spat over Falklands war

External videos
- Diana Gould speaking to Margaret Thatcher (right) and Sue Lawley, in the BBC's Lime Grove Studios, 24 May 1983
- Margaret Thatcher on Nationwide questioned over the Belgrano on YouTube

An exchange on 24 May 1983 between Diana Gould, an English schoolteacher and former Women's Royal Naval Service meteorological officer, and British prime minister Margaret Thatcher was voted in 1999 as one of the most memorable moments in British television. Appearing as a member of the public on BBC Nationwide's On the Spot live election special, Gould confronted Thatcher over the sinking of the Belgrano, an Argentine warship, during the 1982 Falklands War between the United Kingdom and Argentina.

ARA General Belgrano, a cruiser, sank with the loss of 323 lives on 2 May 1982, after Thatcher gave the order to attack it when it sailed near a 200-mile exclusion zone the British had declared around the Falkland Islands. It was hit by two Mark 8 torpedoes launched by HMS Conqueror, a nuclear-powered hunter-killer submarine. The sinking was controversial, in part because of a dispute as to whether the ship had been heading towards or away from the exclusion zone when it was hit. Gould believed it had been sailing away from the exclusion zone. It was made public in 2011 that General Belgrano had in fact been ordered to sail towards it.

The exchange between Thatcher and Gould became iconic, remembered because of Gould's persistence in asking why Thatcher had given the order, which seemed to rattle the prime minister. It was described as "the day Margaret Thatcher met her match". Thatcher was reportedly angry that the BBC had allowed the question to be asked. Her husband, Denis Thatcher, told the producer that the BBC was run by "a nest of long-haired Trots and wooftahs". Gould wrote a book about her experience, On the Spot: The Sinking of the Belgrano (1984).

== Diana Gould ==
Diana Sydney Gould (née Prigg; 18 April 1926 – 3 December 2011) was born in Clifton, Bristol. After attending Howard Gardens Grammar School in Cardiff and winning a scholarship to Cambridge, she studied geography at Newnham College, Cambridge, and graduated with first-class honours. She was also awarded blues for hockey, swimming, and diving. After Cambridge, she became a meteorological officer in Cornwall with the Women's Royal Naval Service and married a fellow serviceman, Clifford Gould of the Fleet Air Arm. In 1955, after leaving the navy, Gould became a part-time PE teacher in Cirencester. Her husband also became a teacher, working at Powell's School and Stratton Primary School in Cirencester. The couple had four children.

Gould had studied the Falklands and the Antarctic at Cambridge and had closely followed the discussions about the Belgrano's position when it was hit.

== Nationwide ==
During a live election-special episode of Nationwide's On the Spot on 24 May 1983, the prime minister had agreed to take questions from pre-selected members of the public sitting in BBC studios around the country. Gould had been invited after writing to the show, although her husband said later that her application had been accepted "much to her horror". She came to the meeting prepared; two days before the programme, she telephoned Tam Dalyell, a Labour MP who had been pressing for information about the sinking, and asked him to brief her.

Thatcher and Sue Lawley, the anchor, were in the BBC's Lime Grove Studios in Shepherd's Bush, west London, where the Prime Minister took questions from 18:25 until 19:00. Gould, in the BBC's Bristol studio, was the fourth member of the public to be invited to speak. "Mrs. Thatcher," she asked, "why, when the Belgrano, the Argentinian battleship, was outside the exclusion zone and actually sailing away from the Falklands, why did you give the orders to sink it?" Thatcher replied: "But it was not sailing away from the Falklands. It was in an area which was a danger to our ships and to our people on them."

Naval forces in the South Atlantic, 1–2 May 1982

Gould said that the ship had been "on a bearing of 280 and it was already west of the Falklands". Thatcher continued to insist that the ship had represented a danger to British troops, and that the Argentine government had been warned that any ships representing a danger within a certain area were vulnerable. Gould pressed the Prime Minister several times to clarify whether the ship had been sailing away from the Falklands, but Thatcher avoided repeating that it had not. She said the full facts would be published in about 30 years, adding: "I think it could only be in Britain that a Prime Minister was accused of sinking an enemy ship that was a danger to our navy, when my main motive was to protect the boys in our navy."

Gould suggested the sinking had put an end to a Peruvian peace proposal, but according to Thatcher, the proposal had not arrived in London until after the sinking. At several points the women clearly became irritated with each other. Gould said at one stage: "That is not good enough, Mrs. Thatcher," to which Thatcher replied: "Would you please let me answer?"

Directly after the interview, Thatcher apparently talked about abolishing the BBC. Denis Thatcher was said to have had a row with BBC staff, telling Roger Bolton, the programme's editor, that the BBC was run by "pinkos" and "a nest of long-haired Trots and wooftahs". The couple's daughter, Carol Thatcher, called it "an example of the most crass nastiness and discourtesy shown to a Prime Minister in an election programme". A 1999 British poll about memorable television spots placed the exchange at number 19. Readers of the Radio Times voted it the ninth-best interview.

== Aftermath ==
=== Belgrano Action Group ===
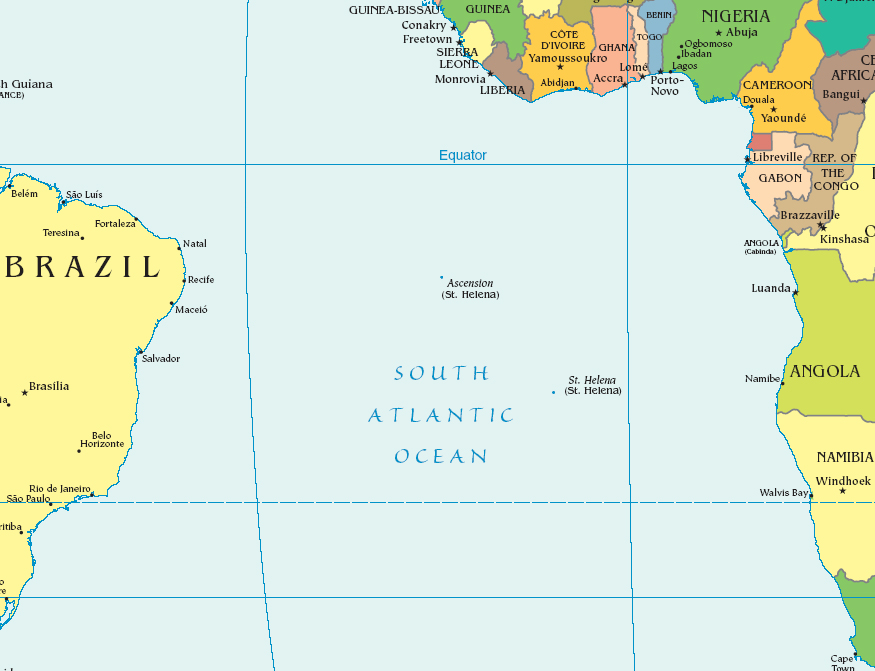
Location of Ascension Island

After the exchange, Gould became involved with the Belgrano Action Group, an activist group set up by Tam Dalyell, Clive Ponting and others. In 1986 she sat on the organising committee of their informal public inquiry into the sinking, held on 7 and 8 November that year in Hampstead Town Hall.

=== Thorp report ===
Thatcher's statement that the public would know the full facts in 30 years may have been a reference to a report she had requested from Major David Thorp, who was in charge of signals intelligence on HMS Intrepid during the war, sailing near Ascension Island.

Titled The Sinking of the Belgrano, the report has not been published, but Thorp wrote in his book The Silent Listener (2011) that General Belgrano had been ordered to sail into the exclusion zone to rendezvous with other ships, possibly for a pincer attack against the British, and not to her home port as the Argentine government claimed at the time. Thatcher had read the report, but she did not make the information public. According to the Daily Telegraph, she may not have wanted to disclose the extent of Britain's eavesdropping.
