= USS Charlotte (SSN-766) =

Los Angeles-class nuclear-powered attack submarine of the US Navy

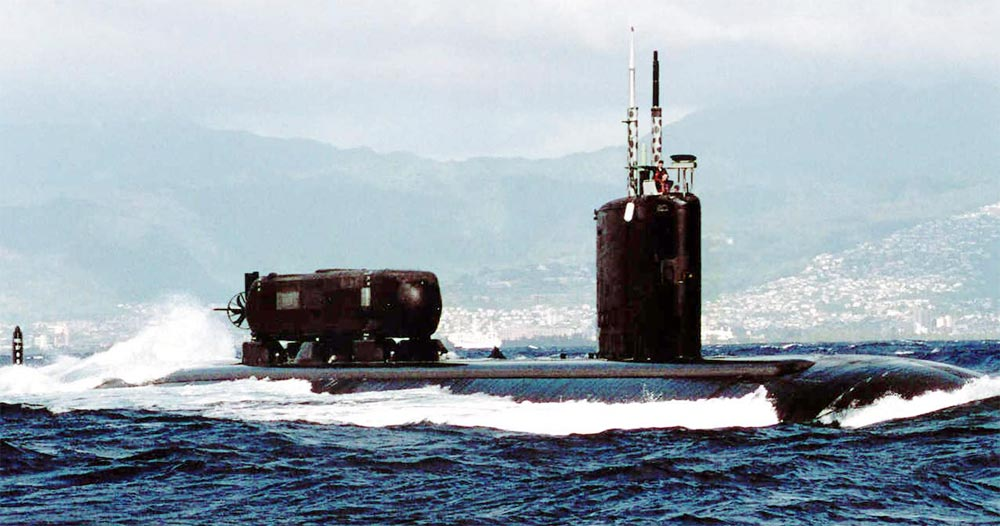
- USS Charlotte (SSN-766)

History

United States
- Name: USS Charlotte
- Namesake: The city of Charlotte, North Carolina
- Awarded: 6 February 1987
- Builder: Newport News Shipbuilding and Drydock Company
- Laid down: 17 August 1990
- Launched: 3 October 1992
- Sponsored by: Mrs. Mary McCormack
- Commissioned: 16 September 1994
- Home port: Naval Station Pearl Harbor
- Motto: Silent Stinger
- Status: In active service
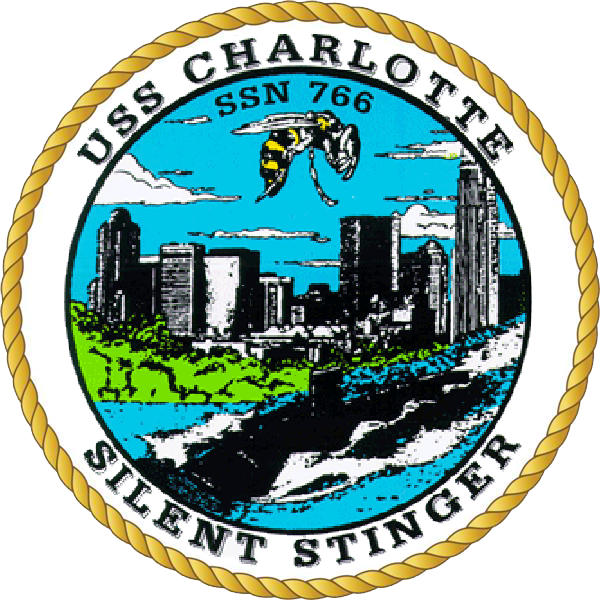
- Badge

General characteristics
- Class & type: Los Angeles-class submarine
- Displacement: 6,000 long tons (6,096 t) light; 6,927 long tons (7,038 t) full; 927 long tons (942 t) dead
- Length: 110.3 m (361 ft 11 in)
- Beam: 10 m (32 ft 10 in)
- Draft: 9.4 m (30 ft 10 in)
- Propulsion: 1 × S6G PWR nuclear reactor with D2W core (165 MW), HEU 93.5%; 2 × steam turbines (33,500) shp; 1 × shaft; 1 × secondary propulsion motor 325 hp (242 kW)
- Complement: 12 officers, 98 men
- Armament: 4 × 21 in (533 mm) torpedo tubes for mix of: Mark 48 ADCAP torpedoes; Tomahawk land attack missiles; Harpoon anti-ship missiles; Mark 67 Submarine Launched Mobile Mines; Mark 60 CAPTOR mines; 12 × VLS cells for BGM-109 Tomahawk land attack missiles

USS Charlotte (SSN-766), a Los Angeles-class submarine, is the fourth ship of the United States Navy to be named for Charlotte, North Carolina. The contract to build her was awarded to Newport News Shipbuilding and Dry Dock Company in Newport News, Virginia on 6 February 1987 and her keel was laid down on 17 August 1990. Sponsored by Mrs. Mary McComack, she was launched on 3 October 1992 and commissioned on 16 September 1994. She arrived at her homeport of Naval Station Pearl Harbor on 17 November 1995.

On 4 March 2026, during the 2026 Iran war Charlotte sank the Iranian frigate IRIS Dena, becoming the first United States naval vessel to sink an enemy vessel with a torpedo since the Pacific theater of World War II, and the second nuclear submarine to do so in history.

== History ==
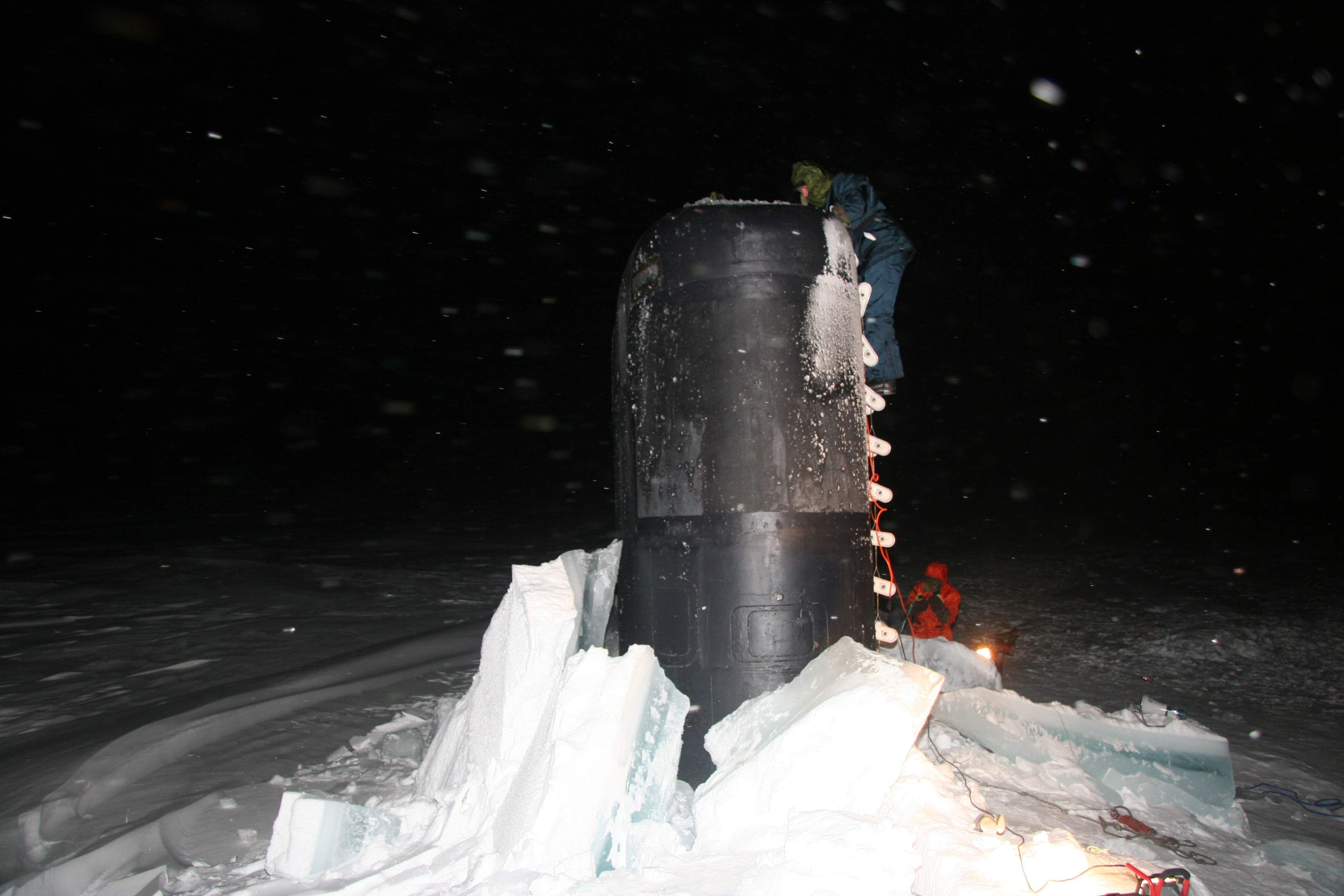
Charlotte at the north pole

On 29 November 2005, Charlotte arrived in Norfolk, Virginia, having taken the northern route from Pearl Harbor, under the Arctic ice cap. Along the way, she surfaced at the North Pole through 61 inches of ice, a record for a Los Angeles-class submarine.

On 24 October 2007, Charlotte returned to Pearl Harbor from Norfolk Naval Shipyard after nearly two years in a Depot Modernization Period.

Charlotte has completed a total of five Western Pacific deployments. In February 1998, she was deployed to the Persian Gulf as part of a multinational military buildup of naval, air, and land forces that included more than 30 American warships and two carrier battle groups. Charlotte and the other American and British warships were deployed as a deterrent in case Iraqi President Saddam Hussein failed to honor his commitment to the United Nations to allow arms inspectors into Iraq. She completed a six-month deployment to the Western Pacific on 13 May 2016.

Charlotte participated in RIMPAC 2022.

=== 2026 Iran War ===
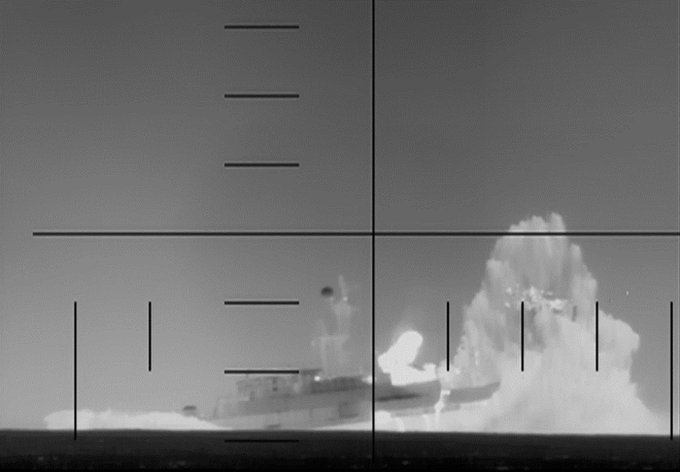
IRIS Dena hit by the Mk-48 torpedo fired from USS Charlotte.

Charlotte sank the Iranian frigate IRIS Dena off the coast of Sri Lanka in March during the 2026 Iran war. In doing so, she became the first U.S. Navy submarine to sink an enemy vessel in combat since the Pacific theater of World War II and the second-ever nuclear submarine to sink an enemy vessel. On July 21, 2026 the acting Secretary of the Navy Hung Cao awarded the Navy Unit Commendation to the crew of the USS Charlotte stating, “The most powerful weapons in our Navy are often the ones never seen—and never heard. This recognition reflects their professionalism, discipline, and unwavering dedication to the mission.”

== Awards ==
- (3) Meritorious Unit Commendation
- (2) Battle "E"
- (2) Secretary of the Navy Letter of Commendation
- (3) Navy Unit Commendation
- (1) Engineering "E"
- (1) DC Red
