= Iranian military bands =

Military bands

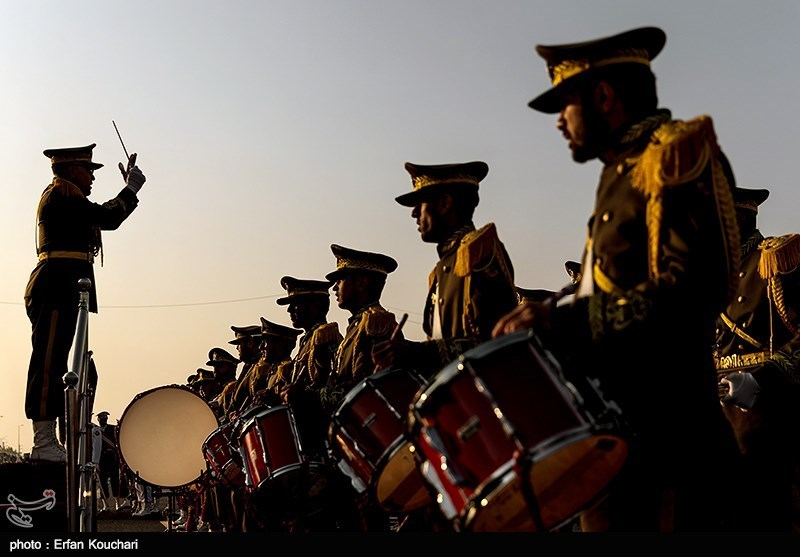
An Iranian military band during the Army Day celebrations in 2018.

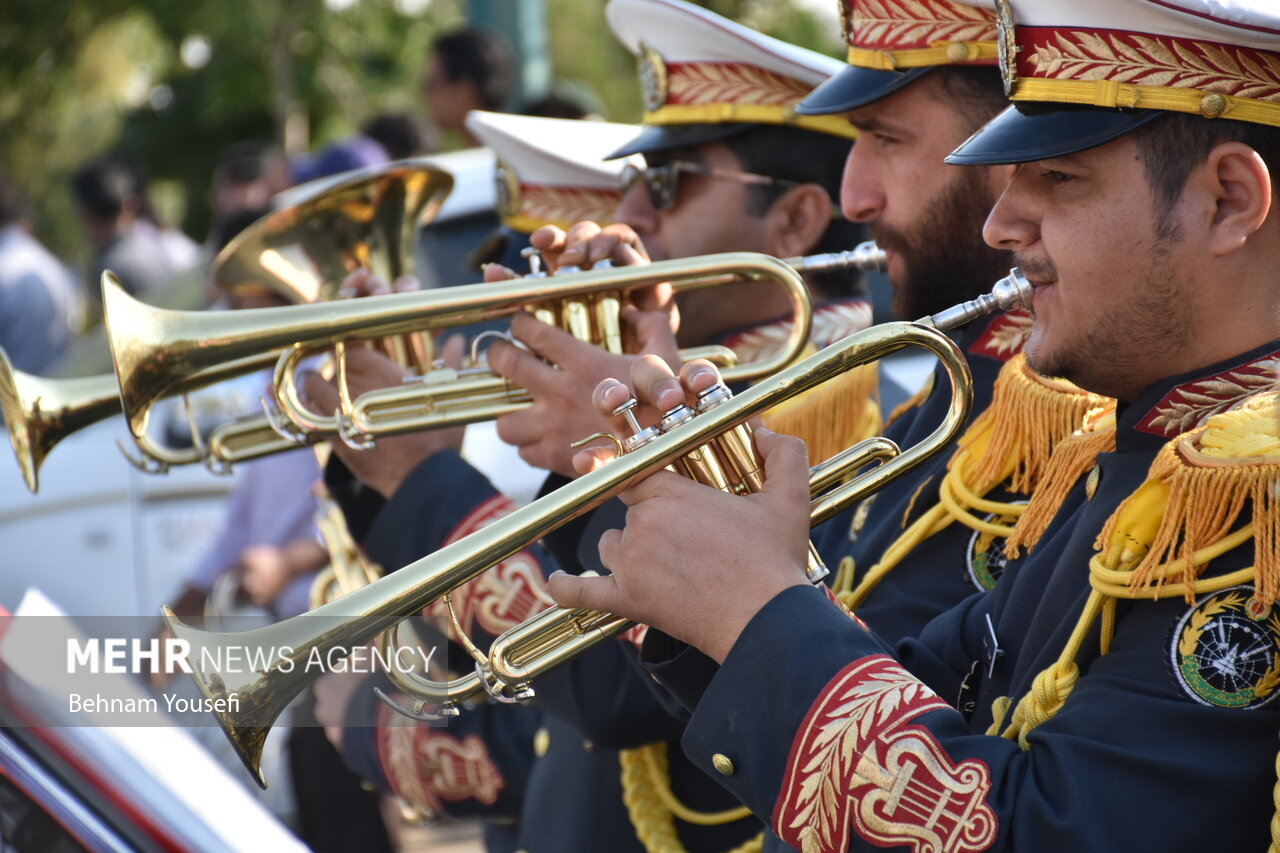
Military band at the 2022 Sacred Defence Week parade in Arak, commemorating the 1980–1988 Iran–Iraq War

Iranian military bands (Persian: گروههای نظامی ایران) refer to musical units that serve in ceremonial roles in the Islamic Revolutionary Guard Corps and the Islamic Republic of Iran Army. The Army also maintains military bands in its Ground Forces, Air Force, and Navy. All Iranian military bands follow French and Arab precedents in terms of percussion and bugles.

== History ==
Historically, the Achaemenid Empire had a culture of martial music for its armies. The first modern concept of martial music and a uniformed military band came to Iran in the mid to late-1800s following the tour of the European continent by Shah Naser al-Din Shah Qajar of Persia. After the conclusion of his first tour in the 1870s, he ordered the creation of a military music school and an Imperial Army band, employing specifically musicians from the Second French Empire. The introduction of French musicians brought about the westernization of the military bands in the country. In 1922, a year after the establishment of the new Iranian Army, the General Directorate of Music began to function at the same time. Salar Maghz was appointed to head the department, and under his leadership, two groups of students graduated in military music and ordinary music. Military music students had to arrange and perform a piece from a military march to earn a degree. Prior to 1979, the Bands of the Imperial Immortal Guard provided musical accompaniment for official events of state.

== Role and organization ==
All of military bands in the country provide honours for senior military units on behalf of the Armed Forces of the Islamic Republic of Iran during events such as state visits and national holidays celebrated in Tehran.

Emblem of the Music Branch of Iranian Army

The National Anthem of the Islamic Republic of Iran performed by the Islamic Republic of Iran Army Band (AFIRI Band).

There is the Military Symphony Orchestra of the Islamic Republic of Iran. Bands are also provided by territorial military units within the country's provinces and major cities. On the provincial level, 56 music units are located all over the country.

== Training ==
- Faculty of Music of the Tehran University of Art
- Music School of the Shahid Khazraei Air Training Command Center

== In popular culture ==
- The documentary "Military Orchestra", produced, directed and edited by Hamzeh Alirezaei and filmed by Saeed Aipaki, was broadcast on Iranian television for 25 minutes on 15 December 2019.

== See also ==
- Indian military bands
- British military bands
- United States military bands
- Russian military bands
