= Regional Development Bank =

State-owned bank in Sri Lanka

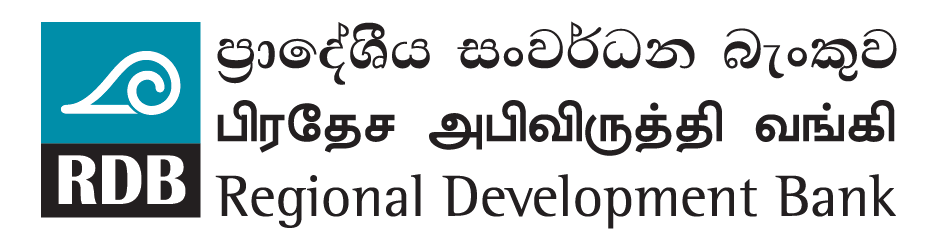
- Trade name: Regional Development Bank
- Native name: Pradeshiya Sanwardhana Bank
- Company type: Government-owned corporation
- Industry: Banking, Financial services
- Founded: 2010; 16 years ago
- Area served: Sri Lanka
- Key people: Mr. Lasantha Fernando(Chairman); Mr. Asanga Bandara Thennakoon (CEO/General Manager)
- Revenue: Rs.27.507 billion (2019)
- Total assets: Rs.199.978 billion (2019)
- Number of employees: 3000+
- Parent: Ministry of Finance
- Website: www.rdb.lk

Regional Development Bank also known as Pradeshiya Sanwardhana Bank (Sinhala: ප්‍රාදේශීය සංවර්ධන බැංකුව Tamil: பிரதேச அபிவிருத்தி வங்கி) is a state-owned bank in Sri Lanka. Its head office is located in Kelaniya. RDB bank has a network of 272 service points and 51 automated teller machines (ATMs)/cash deposit machines (CDMs).

The bank is ISO/IEC 27001:2022 Certified bank since 2025
