= ARA General Belgrano =

Argentine cruiser sunk during the Falklands War

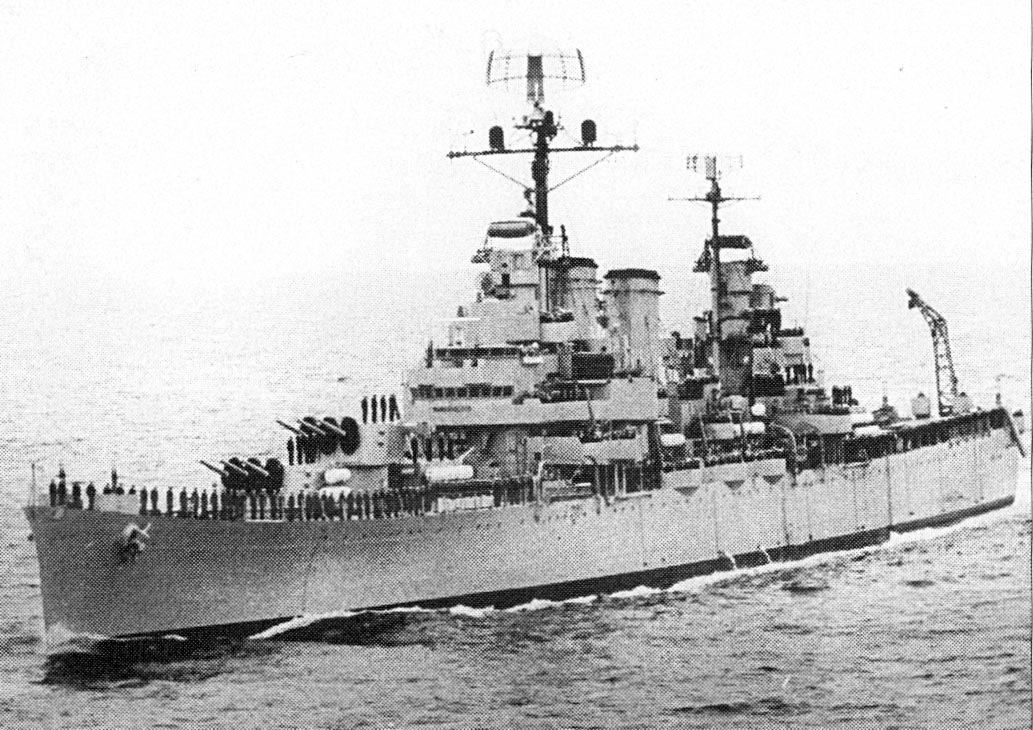
- ARA General Belgrano underway, c. 1968

History

United States
- Name: USS Phoenix
- Acquired: 3 October 1938
- Identification: Hull number: CL-46
- Fate: Decommissioned 3 July 1946; Stricken 27 January 1951

Argentina
- Name: 17 de Octubre
- Namesake: 17 October 1945, the day popular demonstrations forced the release of Juan Perón
- Acquired: 9 April 1951
- Renamed: ARA General Belgrano
- Namesake: Manuel Belgrano
- Identification: Pennant number: C-4
- Fate: Torpedoed and sunk on 2 May 1982
- Badge

General characteristics
- Class & type: Brooklyn-class light cruiser
- Displacement: 9,575 tons (empty) 12,242 (full load)
- Length: 608.3 ft (185.4 m)
- Beam: 61.8 ft (18.8 m)
- Draft: 19.5 ft (5.9 m)
- Speed: 32.5 knots (60.2 km/h; 37.4 mph)
- Complement: 1,138 officers and men
- Armament: 15 × 6 in (150 mm); 8 × 5"/25 caliber gun (127 mm) AA; 40 mm and 20 mm anti-aircraft guns; 2 British Sea Cat missile AA systems (added 1968)
- Armor: Main belt: 5.5 in (140 mm); Deck: 2 in (50 mm); Barbettes: 6 in (152 mm); Turret roofs: 2 in (50 mm); Turret sides: 6.5 in (170 mm); Conning tower: 5 in (127 mm)
- Aircraft carried: 2 helicopters (One Aérospatiale Alouette III was on board when sunk)

ARA General Belgrano (C-4) was an Argentine Navy light cruiser in service from 1951 until 1982. Originally commissioned by the U.S. Navy as USS Phoenix, she saw action in the Pacific theatre of World War II before being sold to Argentina. The vessel was the second to have been named after the Argentine founding father Manuel Belgrano (1770–1820). The first vessel was a 7,069-ton armoured cruiser completed in 1896.

She was sunk on 2 May 1982 during the Falklands War by the Royal Navy submarine Conqueror with the loss of 323 lives. Losses from General Belgrano totalled just under half of Argentine military deaths in the war.

She was the first ship to have been sunk during military operations by a nuclear-powered submarine and the second sunk in action by any type of submarine since World War II. (Note: The second ship to have been sunk during military operations by a nuclear-powered submarine was the Iranian IRIS Dena, which was sunk by the American submarine USS Charlotte during the 2026 Iran war) (Note: The first sunk in action by any type of submarine since World War II was the Indian frigate INS Khukri, sunk by the Pakistani submarine PNS Hangor during the India–Pakistan war of 1971)

== Early career ==
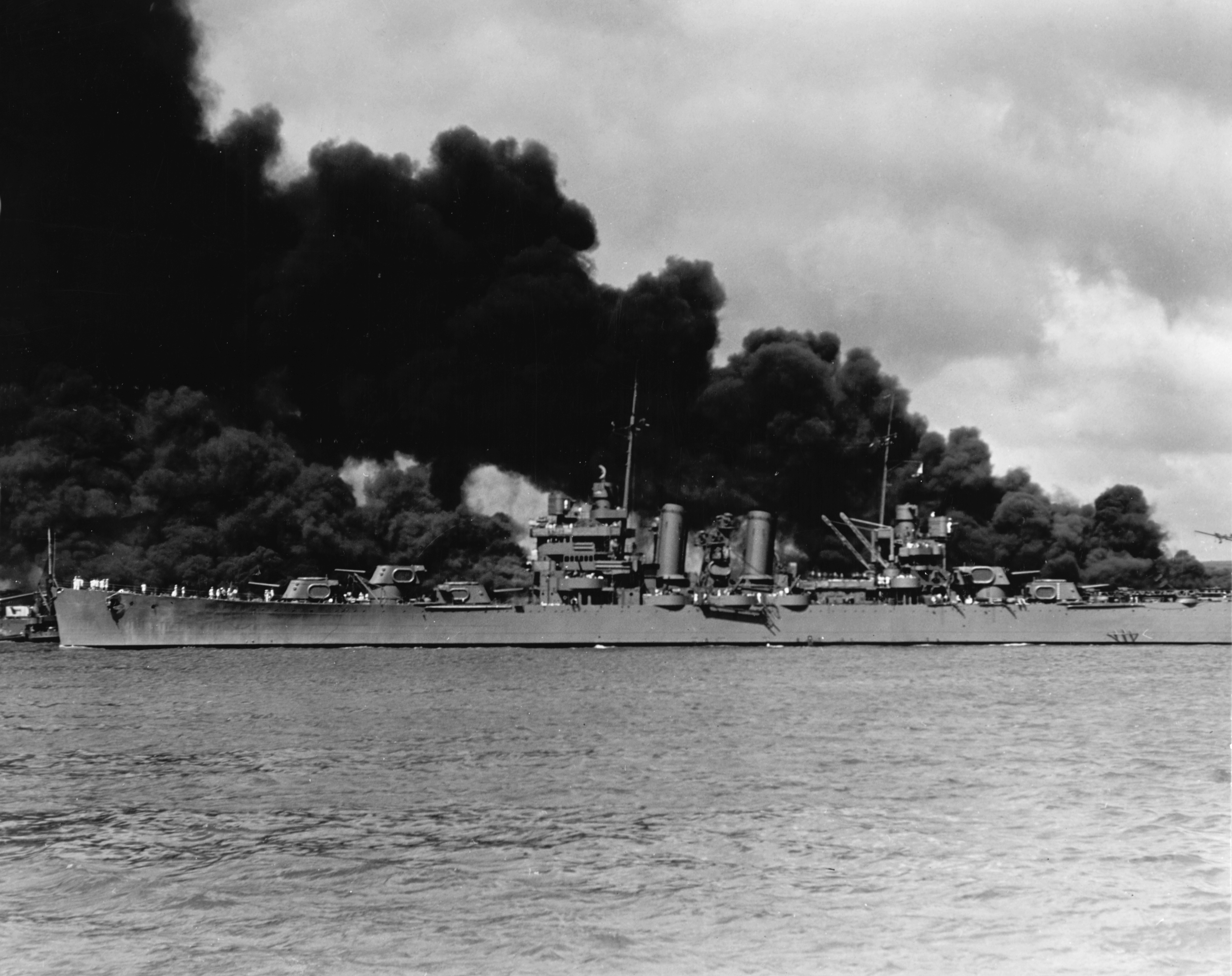
Phoenix at Pearl Harbor in 1941

The warship was built as USS Phoenix, the sixth ship of the Brooklyn-class cruiser design, in Camden, New Jersey, by the New York Shipbuilding Corporation starting in 1935, and launched in March 1938. She survived the Japanese attack on Pearl Harbor in 1941 undamaged, and went on to earn nine battle stars for World War II service. At the end of the war, she was placed in reserve at Philadelphia on 28 February 1946, decommissioned on 3 July that year and remained laid up at Philadelphia.

Phoenix was sold to Argentina in October 1951 and renamed 17 de Octubre after the "Loyalty day", an important symbolic date for the political party of president Juan Perón. Sold with her was another of her class, USS Boise, renamed ARA Nueve de Julio, which was withdrawn in 1977.

17 de Octubre was one of the main naval units that joined the 1955 coup which overthrew Perón, and was afterwards renamed General Belgrano after Manuel Belgrano, a lawyer who had founded the Escuela de Náutica (School of Navigation) in 1799 and with the rank of general fought for Argentine independence from 1811 to 1819. General Belgrano accidentally rammed her sister ship Nueve de Julio on exercises in 1956, causing damage to both. General Belgrano was outfitted with the Sea Cat anti-aircraft missile system between 1967 and 1968.

== Sinking ==
Deployment of naval forces on 1–2 May 1982 in the South Atlantic

On 12 April 1982, following the 1982 invasion of the Falkland Islands, the United Kingdom declared a 200-nautical-mile (370 km) Maritime Exclusion Zone (MEZ) around the Falkland Islands within which any Argentine warship or naval auxiliary entering the MEZ might be attacked by British forces. On 23 April, the British Government clarified in a message that was passed via the Swiss Embassy in Buenos Aires to the Argentine government that any Argentine ship or aircraft that was considered to pose a threat to British forces would be attacked.

On 30 April this was upgraded to the total exclusion zone, within which any sea vessel or aircraft from any country entering the zone might be fired upon without further warning. The zone was stated to be "...without prejudice to the right of the United Kingdom to take whatever additional measures may be needed in exercise of its right of self-defence, under Article 51 of the United Nations Charter." The concept of a total exclusion zone was a novelty in maritime law; the Law of the Sea Convention had no provision for such an instrument. Regardless of the uncertainty of the zone's legal status, it was widely respected by the shipping of neutral nations.

The Argentine military junta began to reinforce the islands in late April when it was realised that the British Task Force was heading south. As part of these movements, Argentine naval units were ordered to take positions around the islands. Two Task Groups designated 79.1, which included the aircraft carrier ARA Veinticinco de Mayo plus two Type 42 destroyers, and 79.2, which included three Exocet missile-armed Drummond-class corvettes, sailed to the north. General Belgrano had left Ushuaia in Tierra del Fuego on 26 April. Two destroyers, ARA Piedra Buena and ARA Hipólito Bouchard (also ex-USN vessels) were detached from Task Group 79.2 and together with the tanker YPF Puerto Rosales, joined General Belgrano to form Task Group 79.3.

By 29 April, the ships were patrolling the Burdwood Bank, south of the islands. On 30 April, General Belgrano was detected by the British nuclear-powered hunter-killer submarine Conqueror. The submarine approached over the following day. On 1 May 1982, Admiral Juan Lombardo ordered all Argentine naval units to seek out the British task force around the Falklands and launch a "massive attack" the following day. General Belgrano, which was outside and to the south-west of the exclusion zone, was ordered south-east.

Lombardo's signal was intercepted by British Intelligence. As a result, Prime Minister Margaret Thatcher and her War Cabinet, meeting at Chequers the following day, agreed to a request from Admiral Terence Lewin, the Chief of the Defence Staff, to alter the rules of engagement and allow an attack on General Belgrano outside the exclusion zone. Although the group was outside the British-declared total exclusion zone of 370 km (200 nautical miles) radius from the islands, the British decided that it was a threat. After consultation at Cabinet level, Thatcher agreed that Commander Chris Wreford-Brown should attack General Belgrano.

At 14:57 (Falkland Islands Time) on 2 May, Conqueror fired three 21-inch Mk 8 mod 4 torpedoes (conventional, non-guided, torpedoes in service from 1927), each with an 805-pound (363 kg) Torpex warhead. While Conqueror was also equipped with the newer Mark 24 Tigerfish homing torpedo, there were doubts about its reliability. Initial reports from Argentina claimed that Conqueror fired two Tigerfish torpedoes on General Belgrano. Two of the three torpedoes hit General Belgrano. According to the Argentine government, General Belgrano's position was 55°24′S 61°32′W.

One of the torpedoes struck 10 to 15 metres (33 to 49 ft) aft of the bow, outside the area protected by either the ship's side armour or the internal anti-torpedo bulge. This blew off the ship's bow, but the internal torpedo bulkheads held and the forward powder magazine for the 40 mm gun did not detonate. It is believed that none of the ship's company were in that part of the ship at the time of the explosion.

The second torpedo struck about three-quarters of the way along the ship, just outside the rear limit of the side armour plating. The torpedo punched through the side of the ship before exploding in the aft machine room. The explosion tore upward through two messes and a relaxation area called "the Soda Fountain" before finally ripping a 20-metre-long (66 ft) hole in the main deck. Later reports put the number of deaths in the area around the explosion at 275 men. After the explosion, the ship rapidly filled with smoke. The explosion also damaged General Belgrano's electrical power system, preventing her from putting out a radio distress call. Though the forward bulkheads held, water was rushing in through the hole created by the second torpedo and could not be pumped out because of the electrical power failure. In addition, although the ship should have been "at action stations", she was sailing with the water-tight doors open.

The ship began to list to port and to sink towards the bow. Twenty minutes after the attack, at 16:24, Captain Bonzo ordered the crew to abandon ship. Inflatable life rafts were deployed, and the evacuation began without panic. The two escort ships were unaware of what was happening to General Belgrano, as they were out of touch with her in the gloom and had not seen the distress rockets or lamp signals. Adding to the confusion, the crew of Bouchard felt an impact that was possibly the third torpedo striking at the end of its run (an examination of the ship later showed an impact mark consistent with a torpedo). The two ships continued on their course westward. By the time the ships realised that something had happened to General Belgrano, it was already dark and the weather had worsened, scattering the life rafts.

Argentine and Chilean ships rescued 772 men from 3 to 5 May. In total, 323 were killed in the attack: 321 members of the crew and two civilians who were on board at the time. Majority of the dead were killed as direct result of the torpedo explosion rather than drowning. A fierce storm whipped against the rafts the rest of the afternoon, throughout the night, and into the morning of May 3. Huge waves, winds of up to 120 kilometers per hour, and a thermal sensation of between -10 and -20 °C put the survivors to the test for between 20 and 43 hours. Of the initial 793 crew members rescued from the freezing waters of the South Atlantic, 772 survived.

=== Naval outcome ===
Following the loss of General Belgrano, the Argentine fleet returned to its bases and played no major role in the rest of the conflict. British nuclear submarines continued to operate in the sea areas between Argentina and the Falkland Islands, gathering intelligence, providing early warning of air raids and effectively imposing sea denial. With the withdrawal of the aircraft carrier ARA Veinticinco de Mayo, all Argentine aircraft had to operate from land bases at the limit of their range. The minimal role of the Navy in the rest of the campaign led to a considerable loss of credibility and influence within the Junta.

== Controversy over the sinking ==
The legality of the sinking of General Belgrano has been disputed due to disagreement on the exact nature of the Maritime Exclusion Zone (MEZ) and whether General Belgrano had been returning to port at the time of the sinking. Through a message passed via the Swiss Embassy in Buenos Aires to the Argentine government nine days before the sinking, the UK made clear that it no longer considered the 200 mile exclusion zone as the limit of its military action. On 1 May 1982, Admiral Juan Lombardo ordered all Argentine naval units to seek out the British task force around the Falklands and launch a "massive attack" the following day.

In 2003, the ship's captain Hector Bonzo confirmed that General Belgrano had actually been manoeuvering, not "sailing away" from the exclusion zone. Captain Bonzo stated that any suggestion that HMS Conqueror's actions were a "betrayal" was utterly wrong; rather, the submarine carried out its duties according to the accepted rules of war. In an interview two years before his death in 2009, he further stated that: "It was absolutely not a war crime. It was an act of war, lamentably legal."

The sinking became a cause célèbre for British anti-war campaigners such as Labour MP Tam Dalyell. Early reports suggested that more than 1,000 Argentine sailors might have been killed in the sinking; it was around a third of that number.

The sinking occurred 14 hours after President of Peru Fernando Belaúnde proposed a comprehensive peace plan and called for regional unity, although Margaret Thatcher and diplomats in London did not see this document until after the sinking of General Belgrano. Diplomatic efforts to that point had failed completely. After the sinking, Argentina rejected the plan but the UK indicated its acceptance on 5 May. The news was subsequently dominated by military action and the British continued to offer ceasefire terms until 1 June that were rejected by the Junta.

=== Argentine response ===
On 3 May 1982, Argentina's Chancellery released a statement in the name of the Argentinian government that read:

The Government of Argentina, broadening what was reported by the Joint Staff in its statement No. 15, states:

1. That at 17 hours on 2 May, the cruiser ARA General Belgrano was attacked and sunk by a British submarine in a point at 55° 24' south latitude and 61° 32' west longitude. There are 1,042 men aboard the ship. Rescue operations for survivors are being carried out.
2. That this point is located 36 miles outside the maritime exclusion zone set by the UK government in the statement by its Ministry of Defence on 28 April 1982, confirming the provisions on 12 April 1982. That area is marked by a "circle with a radius of 200 nautical miles from the 51° 40' South latitude and 59° 30' west longitude", as stated in the declaration.
3. That such an attack is a treacherous act of armed aggression perpetrated by the British government in violation of the UN Charter and the ceasefire ordered by United Nations Security Council Resolution 502.
4. That, in the face of this new attack, Argentina reiterates to the national and global public its adherence to the ceasefire mandated by the Security Council on the mentioned resolution. It has only limited itself to responding to Britain's attacks, without using force beyond what is necessary to ensure the defense of its territories.

=== Legal situation ===
Neither the United Kingdom nor Argentina declared war during the conflict. Combat was confined to the Falkland Islands, South Georgia, and the surrounding area. General Belgrano was sunk outside the 200-nautical-mile (370 km) total exclusion zone around the Falklands, delimited by the UK. Through a message passed via the Swiss Embassy in Buenos Aires to the Argentine government on 23 April, the UK had made clear that it no longer considered the 200-mile (370 km) exclusion zone as the limit of its military action. The message read:

In announcing the establishment of a Maritime Exclusion Zone around the Falkland Islands, Her Majesty's Government made it clear that this measure was without prejudice to the right of the United Kingdom to take whatever additional measures may be needed in the exercise of its right of self-defence under Article 51 of the United Nations Charter. In this connection Her Majesty's Government now wishes to make clear that any approach on the part of Argentine warships, including submarines, naval auxiliaries or military aircraft, which could amount to a threat to interfere with the mission of British Forces in the South Atlantic will encounter the appropriate response. All Argentine aircraft, including civil aircraft engaged in surveillance of these British forces, will be regarded as hostile and are liable to be dealt with accordingly.

Interviews conducted by Martin Middlebrook for his book Argentine Fight for the Falklands indicated that Argentine naval officers understood that the intent of the message was to indicate that any ships operating near the exclusion zone could be attacked. Argentine Rear Admiral Allara, who was in charge of the task force of which General Belgrano was part, said: "After that message of 23 April, the entire South Atlantic was an operational theatre for both sides. We, as professionals, said it was just too bad that we lost the Belgrano". Captain Bonzo also told Middlebrook that he was not angry about the attack on his ship and that

The limit [exclusion zone] did not exclude danger or risks; it was all the same in or out. I would like to be quite precise that, as far as I was concerned, the 200-mile limit was valid until 1 May, that is while diplomatic negotiations were taking place and/or until a real act of war took place, and that had happened on 1 May.

Admiral Sandy Woodward, who commanded the British task force during the war, wrote in his 1997 book One Hundred Days that HMS Conqueror received a signal changing the rules of engagement and that "The change said quite clearly he may now attack the Belgrano, outside the TEZ".

=== Later political controversy ===
Some details of the action were leaked to a British Member of Parliament, Tam Dalyell, in 1985 by the senior civil servant Clive Ponting, resulting in the unsuccessful prosecution of the latter under the Official Secrets Act 1911. According to the documents General Belgrano was sailing away from the exclusion zone when she was attacked and sunk.

In May 1983, Thatcher appeared on Nationwide, a live television programme on BBC1, where a teacher, Diana Gould, questioned her about the sinking, saying that the ship was already west of the Falklands and heading towards the Argentine mainland to the west. Gould also said that the Peruvian peace proposal must have reached London in the 14 hours between its publication and the sinking of General Belgrano, and the escalation of the war could have thus been prevented. In the emotional exchange that followed, Thatcher answered that the vessel was a threat to British ships and lives and denied that the peace proposal had reached her. She added that "One day, all of the facts, in about 30 years time, will be published", apparently a reference to a classified report prepared by intelligence officer Major David Thorp for Thatcher after the incident.

After the programme, Thatcher's husband Denis lashed out at its producer in the entertainment suite, saying that his wife had been "stitched up by bloody BBC poofs and Trots". Thatcher herself commented during the interview: "I think it could only be in Britain that a prime minister was accused of sinking an enemy ship that was a danger to our navy, when my main motive was to protect the boys in our navy."

According to the British historian Sir Lawrence Freedman, neither Thatcher nor the Cabinet was aware of General Belgrano's change of course before the cruiser was attacked. In his book One Hundred Days, Admiral Woodward claims that General Belgrano was part of the southern part of a pincer movement aimed at the task force, and had to be sunk quickly. He wrote:

The speed and direction of an enemy ship can be irrelevant, because both can change quickly. What counts is his position, his capability and what I believe to be his intention.

=== "Gotcha" headline ===
The Sun's infamous "Gotcha" headline

On 4 May, the British tabloid newspaper The Sun ran the controversial headline "Gotcha" in reference to the sinking of General Belgrano. Kelvin MacKenzie, the newspaper's editor, was reported to have used an impromptu exclamation by The Sun's features editor, Wendy Henry, as the inspiration for the headline. The accompanying text reported that General Belgrano had only been hit and damaged and not sunk, while a "gunboat" (actually the armed tug ARA Alférez Sobral) had sunk, when in fact the reverse was the case. After early editions went to press, further reports suggested a major loss of life, and Mackenzie toned down the headline to read "Did 1,200 Argies drown?" in later editions.

Few readers in the UK saw the headline at first hand as it was only used on copies of the first northern editions, while southern editions and later editions in the North carried the toned-down headline, but the "Gotcha" headline was widely publicised.

== Aftermath ==
In August 1994, an official Argentine Defence Ministry report written by armed forces auditor Eugenio Miari was released which described the sinking of General Belgrano as "a legal act of war", explaining that "acts of war can be carried out in all of the enemy's territory" and "they can also take place in those areas over which no state can claim sovereignty, in international waters". Argentinian veterans were said to be dismayed at the conclusion about General Belgrano, and the President of the Federation of Argentine War Veterans Luis Ibáñez hoped to produce more witnesses to show that the sinking was a war crime.

In 1999 Sir Michael Boyce, First Sea Lord of the Royal Navy, visited the Puerto Belgrano naval base and paid tribute to those who died. In 2003 a search team aboard Seacor Lenga, crewed by Argentine and British veterans, was sponsored by National Geographic to find the sunken cruiser but failed to locate it. The area where General Belgrano sank, though not found, is classified as a war grave under Argentine Congress law 25.546.

In 2000, lawyers representing the families of the sailors killed onboard General Belgrano attempted to sue the British government in the European Court of Human Rights on the grounds that the attack took place outside the exclusion zone. It was an attempt to pressure the Argentine government to lodge an action against the UK in the International Court of Justice, but was ruled inadmissible by the Court of Human Rights on the grounds that it had been submitted too late.

La Nación in 2005 published a reader's letter from admiral Enrique Molina Pico, who had been head of the Argentine Navy in the 1990s, saying that General Belgrano was part of an operation that posed a real threat to the British task force, but was holding off for tactical reasons. Molina Pico added that "To leave the exclusion zone was not to leave the combat zone to enter a protected area". Molina Pico explicitly stated that the sinking was not a war crime, but a combat action.

General Belgrano's captain, Héctor Bonzo, died on 22 April 2009, aged 76. He had spent his last years working for an association called Amigos del Crucero General Belgrano (Friends of the Cruiser General Belgrano) whose purpose was to help those affected by the sinking. Bonzo also wrote his memories about the sinking in the book 1093 Tripulantes del Crucero ARA General Belgrano, published in 1992. In this book he wrote that it is "improper to accept that ... the attack by HMS Conqueror was a betrayal". During an interview in 2003 he had stated that General Belgrano was only temporarily sailing to the west at the time of the attack, and his orders were to attack any British ships that came within range.

In late 2011, major David Thorp, a former British military intelligence officer who led the signals interception team aboard HMS Intrepid, released the book The Silent Listener detailing the role of intelligence in the Falklands War. In the book he said that, although General Belgrano was observed by Conqueror to be sailing away from the Falklands at the time of the attack, she had actually been ordered to proceed to a rendezvous point within the exclusion zone. A report prepared by Thorp for Thatcher several months after the incident stated the destination of the vessel was not to her home port as the Argentine junta stated; the report was not released because the prime minister did not want to compromise British signals intelligence capabilities.

In 2012 the president of Argentina, Cristina Fernández de Kirchner, referred to the sinking of General Belgrano as a "war crime". However, the Argentine Navy has held the view that the sinking was a legitimate act of war, a position that was asserted by the Argentine Navy before various courts in 1995, and by the vessel's captain Hector Bonzo in 2003.

== See also ==
- List of cruisers
- List of ships of the Argentine Navy
- List of ships sunk by submarines by death toll
