= Galle National Hospital =

Galle National Hospital - Karapitiya (Teaching)
- Ministry of Health, Sri Lanka

Geography
- Location: Karapitiya, Galle, Southern Province, Sri Lanka
- Coordinates: 6.066531°N 80.225569°E

Organisation
- Care system: Public
- Type: National Hospital
- Affiliated university: University of Ruhuna

Services
- Emergency department: Yes
- Beds: 2,066 (2800+ by the end of 2024)

History
- Founded: 1982

Links
- Lists: Hospitals in Sri Lanka

Galle National Hospital, located in Karapitiya, Galle, is the largest tertiary care centre in the Southern Province of Sri Lanka. It was established in 1982 and is the main training facility for the Faculty of Medicine, University of Ruhuna. The hospital consists of 2,066 beds (will consist 2800+ beds by the end of 2024), 60+ wards and several other units. It is the third largest tertiary care hospital in the country. Karapitiya Hospital meets the health needs of people in Southern Province and also provides services to the people of the surrounding areas. In 2024, it was proposed to be renamed the Galle National Hospital.

== Administration ==
The hospital is administered by the Ministry of Health in Sri Lanka and the hospital provides free health care services to the people all 24 hours of the day. The present director of the hospital is Dr. Priyantha Athapaththu.

== Healthcare facilities ==
In addition to the General medical and Surgical care, the hospital provides a wide variety of health care services such as,

- Paediatrics
- Psychiatry
- Cardiology
- Rheumatology
- Oncology
- Orthopedics
- Oral & Maxillofacial Surgery
- Neurology
- Neuro surgery
- Otolaryngology
- Ophthalmology
- Dermatology
- Gastroenterology
- Radiology
- Dentistry
- Haemodialysis

Further the hospital also consists of out patient departments with many others clinics and a blood bank. Facilities for modern investigations are also freely available at the hospital.

== See also ==
- List of hospitals in Sri Lanka
- Health in Sri Lanka
