= Mark 48 torpedo =

American heavyweight submarine-launched torpedoes

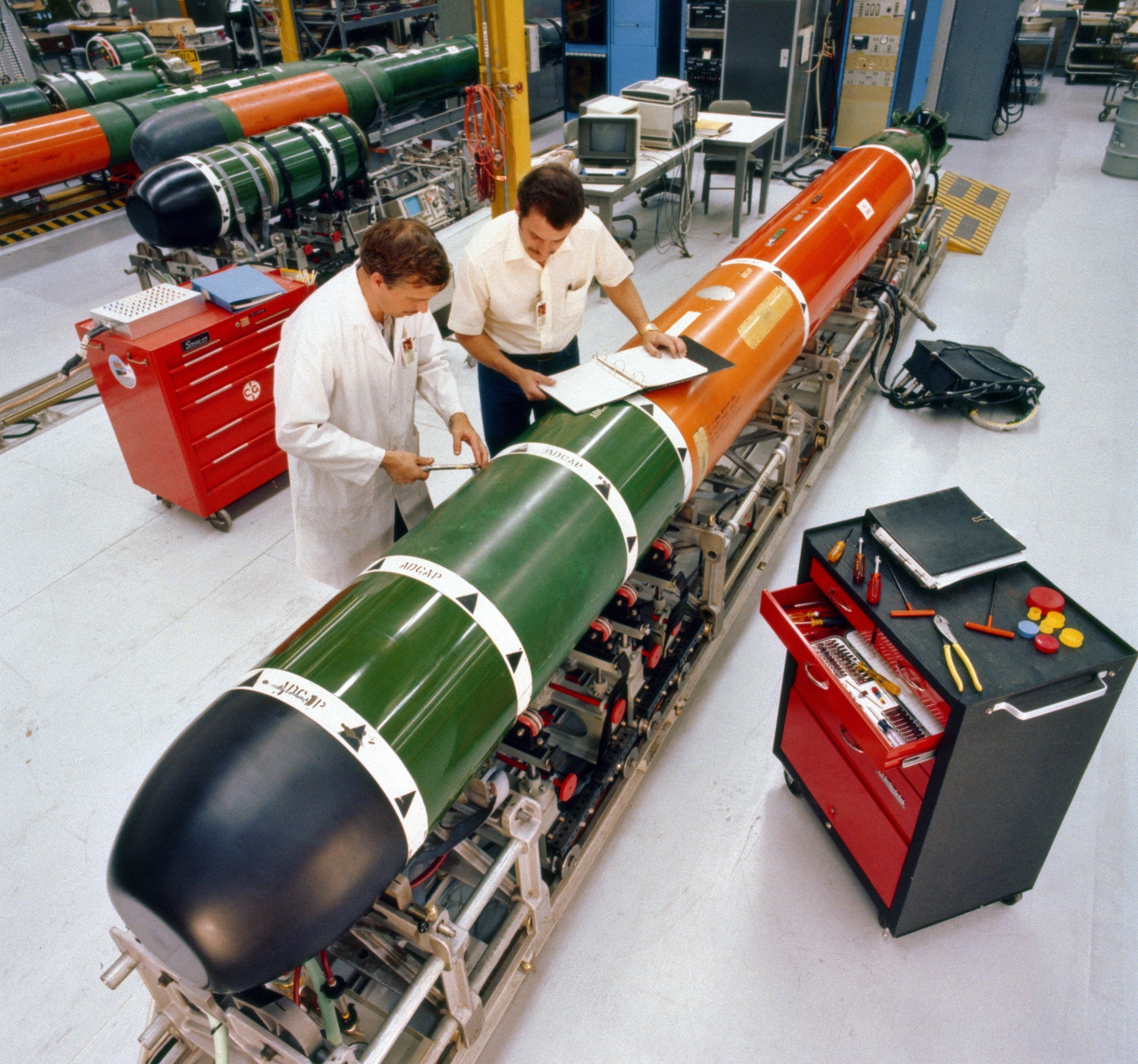
- Technicians perform maintenance on a Mark 48 torpedo in 1982.
- Type: Heavyweight dual-purpose ASW and ASuW torpedo
- Place of origin: United States

Service history
- In service: 1972–present (Mod 1) 1988–present (ADCAP) 2008–present Mod 7 Common Broadband Advanced Sonar System (CBASS)
- Used by: United States Navy; Brazilian Navy; Royal Australian Navy; Royal Canadian Navy; Royal Netherlands Navy
- Wars: 2026 Iran war

Production history
- Designer: Gould, Inc. Naval Surface Warfare Center
- Designed: 1967
- Manufacturer: Gould/Honeywell (Mod 1); Hughes Aircraft (ADCAP) Westinghouse Naval Systems Cleveland Ohio
- Unit cost: $894,000 (1978 USD) $3,500,000 (ADCAP) (1988) $3,800,000 (CBASS)(2005 USD) $5.39m (2022)

Specifications
- Mass: 3,434 lb (1,558 kg) (original), 3,695 lb (1,676 kg) (ADCAP)
- Length: 19 ft (5.8 m)
- Diameter: 21 in (530 mm)
- Effective firing range: 12 mi (20 km; 11 nmi), up to 17.0 mi (27.4 km; 14.8 nmi) at 65 kn (120 km/h; 75 mph)(ADCAP); 24 mi (38 km; 21 nmi) at 55 kn (102 km/h; 63 mph) or 31 mi (50 km; 27 nmi) at 40 kn (74 km/h; 46 mph) (estimated), officially "greater than 5 miles (8.0 km; 4.3 nmi)"
- Warhead: high explosive plus unused fuel
- Warhead weight: 647 lb (293 kg)
- Detonation mechanism: proximity fuze
- Engine: swash-plate piston engine; pump jet
- Propellant: Otto fuel II
- Maximum depth: 500 fathoms, 800 m (2,600 ft) (estimated), officially "greater than 1,200 ft"
- Maximum speed: 65 kn (120 km/h; 75 mph) (estimated) officially "greater than 28 kn (52 km/h; 32 mph)"
- Guidance system: Common Broadband Advanced Sonar System
- Launch platform: Submarine

The Mark 48 and its improved Advanced Capability (ADCAP) variant are American heavyweight submarine-launched torpedoes. They were designed to sink deep-diving nuclear-powered submarines and high-performance surface ships.

First brought into service in 1972, the Mark 48 was not used in combat until 4 March 2026, when the US Navy submarine USS Charlotte fired two Mark 48s at the Iranian Navy frigate IRIS Dena, one of which hit and sunk the ship.

== History ==
The Mark 48 was initially developed as research torpedo concept II (RETORC II), one of several weapons recommended for implementation by Project Nobska, a 1956 summer study on submarine warfare. The Mk-48 torpedo was designed at the end of the 1960s by Gould Ocean systems Division of Cleveland, Ohio, to keep up with the advances in Soviet submarine technology. Operational since 1972, it replaced the Mk-37, Mk-14 and Mk-16 torpedoes as the principal weapon of US Navy submarines. With the entry into service of the new Soviet Alfa-class submarine in 1977, the decision was made to first upgrade the weapon to MOD 4 status and then accelerate the ADCAP program, which would bring significant modifications to the torpedo. Tests were run to ensure that the weapon could keep up with the developments and the weapon was modified with improved acoustics and electronics. The new version of the weapon, also known as Mk-48 Mod 5 (ADCAP), was extensively tested and production started in 1985, with entry into service in 1988. From then on, various upgrades have been added to the torpedo. As of 2012 the Mk-48 Mod 6 was in service; a Mod 7 version was test fired in 2008 in Exercise RIMPAC. The inventory of the US Navy in 2001 was 1,046 Mk-48 torpedoes. In 2017 Lockheed's production was approximately 50 per year.

== Deployment ==
The Mk-48 torpedo is designed to be launched from submarine torpedo tubes. The weapon is carried by all US Navy submarines, including Ohio-class ballistic missile submarines and Seawolf-, Los Angeles-, and Virginia-class attack submarines. It is also used on Canadian, Australian, and Dutch submarines.

Mk-48 and Mk-48 ADCAP torpedoes can be guided from a submarine by wires attached to the torpedo. They can also use their own active or passive sensors to execute programmed target search, acquisition, and attack procedures. The torpedo is designed to detonate under the keel of a surface ship, breaking the keel and destroying its structural integrity. In the event of a miss, it can circle back for another attempt.

== Propulsion ==
The swashplate piston engine is fueled by Otto fuel II, a monopropellant which combusts to drive the engine. The thrust is generated by a propulsor assembly, which is an axial-flow pump-jet with approximately 15 rotor blades and 12 stator blades based on US Navy computer graphics from 2011.

== Sensors and improvements ==
The torpedo's seeker has an active electronically steered "pinger" (2D phased array sonar) that helps avoid having to maneuver as it approaches the target. Unconfirmed reports indicate that the torpedo's sensors can monitor surrounding electrical and magnetic fields. This may refer to the electromagnetic coils on the warhead (at least from 1977 to 1981), used to sense the metallic mass of the ship's hull and detonate at the proper stand-off distance.

The torpedo has been the subject of continued improvement over its service lifetime. In the 1990s, a Mod 6 variant of the ADCAP provided much improved noise isolation for the engine, which makes this torpedo more difficult to detect for a potential target.

The Mk48 Mod 7 Common Broadband Advanced Sonar System (CBASS) torpedo is optimized for both the deep and littoral waters and has advanced counter-countermeasure capabilities. The MK48 ADCAP Mod 7 (CBASS) torpedo is the result of a Joint Development Program with the Royal Australian Navy and reached Initial Operational Capability in 2006. The Mod 7 variant increases sonar bandwidth, enabling it to transmit and receive pings over a wider frequency band, taking advantage of broadband signal processing techniques to greatly improve search, acquisition, and attack effectiveness. This version is much more resistant to enemy countermeasures.

On July 25, 2008, a MK 48 Mod 7 CBASS torpedo fired by an Australian Collins-class submarine, HMAS Waller, successfully sank a test target during the Rim of the Pacific 2008 (RIMPAC) exercises.

In 2015 the USN announced plans to restart production and seek a more modular design. Lockheed Martin is to upgrade existing Mark 48s to include a new guidance-control system known as the Common Broadband Advanced Sonar System (CBASS), in addition to improving propulsion and resistance to electronic countermeasures.

Starting in 2003, the US Navy began the Stealth Torpedo Enhancement Program which aims to upgrade the capability of the existing Mk 48 design by implementing alternative fuel sources including electric fuel cells, and a "swim out" capability, a capability that allows a torpedo to leave the tube under its own power without using a torpedo tube's noisier compressed air-launch system. The program is ongoing, with many details yet classified.

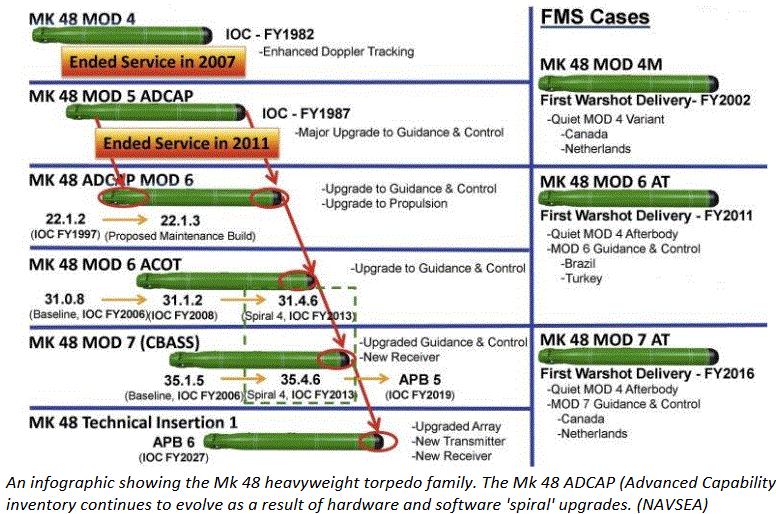

== Operators ==
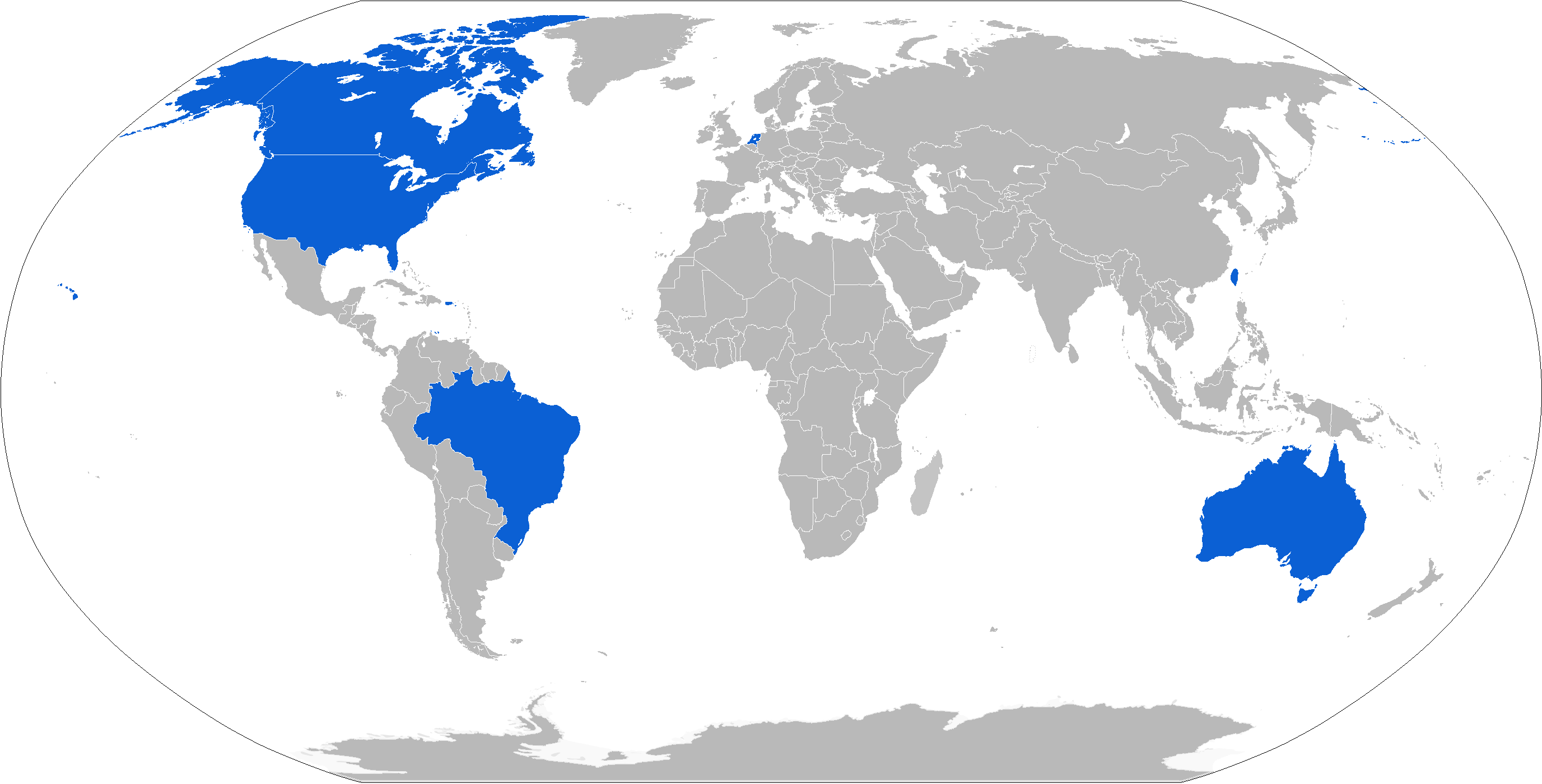
Map with Mark 48 torpedo operators in blue

=== Current operators ===
- Royal Australian Navy
- Brazilian Navy
- Royal Canadian Navy
- Royal Netherlands Navy
- United States Navy
- Republic of China Navy (Taiwan)

== Operational history ==
Mark 48 in action during the sinking of IRIS Dena

In March 2026, the Iranian naval frigate IRIS Dena was participated in the 2026 International Fleet Review. The ship was unarmed, as required by the rules of the fleet review. As the Dena returned from the Fleet Review, the 2026 Iran War broke out, following which it was attacked and sunk by two Mark 48 torpedoes fired from USS Charlotte in international waters near the southern coast of Sri Lanka.

== See also ==
- American 21 inch torpedo
- Baek Sang Eo (White Shark) torpedo
- Black Shark torpedo
- DM2A4
- F21 Artemis
- Futlyar
- Roketsan Akya
- Spearfish torpedo
- Tigerfish torpedo
- Torped 62
- Type 65 torpedo
- Type 89 torpedo
- Varunastra (torpedo)
- Yu-6 torpedo
- Copperhead-500M, an autonomous unmanned undersea loitering munition comparable in size and capability to the Mark 48.
