= HMS Conqueror (S48) =

1971 Churchill-class nuclear-powered fleet submarine of the Royal Navy

- Conqueror returning to the Clyde Submarine base (Faslane) flying the Jolly Roger after the Falklands War, 4 July 1982

History

United Kingdom
- Ordered: 9 August 1966
- Builder: Cammell Laird, Birkenhead
- Laid down: 5 December 1967
- Launched: 28 August 1969
- Commissioned: 9 November 1971
- Decommissioned: 2 August 1990
- Nickname(s): "Conks"
- Honours and awards: Falkland Islands, 1982
- Status: At Devonport awaiting dismantling
- Badge

General characteristics
- Class & type: Churchill-class submarine
- Displacement: 4,900 tonnes (submerged)
- Length: 86.9 m (285 ft)
- Beam: 10.1 m (33 ft)
- Draught: 8.2 m (27 ft)
- Propulsion: One Rolls-Royce PWR nuclear reactor, one shaft
- Speed: 28 knots (52 km/h) (submerged)
- Range: Limited only by food stored on board
- Complement: 103
- Armament: 6 × 533 mm tubes capable of firing: Mark 8 torpedoes; Tigerfish torpedoes; RN Sub Harpoon Missiles

HMS Conqueror is a British Churchill-class nuclear-powered fleet submarine that served in the Royal Navy from 1971 to 1990. She was the third submarine of her class, following the earlier Churchill and Courageous, all designed to face the Soviet threat at sea. She was built by Cammell Laird at Birkenhead.

Conqueror was the first nuclear-powered submarine to have engaged an enemy ship with torpedoes, sinking the cruiser General Belgrano during the 1982 Falklands War. (Note: The only other known submarines to sink a warship since World War II are the Pakistan Navy's diesel fueled PNS Hangor during the Indo-Pakistani War of 1971, and the US Navy's nuclear-powered USS Charlotte during the 2026 Iran war.)

== Construction ==
Conqueror was ordered on 9 August 1966 and was laid down at Cammell Laird's Birkenhead shipyard on 5 December 1967; she was launched on 28 August 1969. Construction was delayed by slow working by Cammell Laird's workforce, and sabotage of the ship's gearbox, which delayed completion by several months. Conqueror was finally commissioned on 9 November 1971; she was the last nuclear submarine built by Cammell Laird.

== Operational history ==
=== Falklands War ===
Conqueror, commanded by Commander Chris Wreford-Brown, was deployed during the Falklands War, setting sail from Faslane Naval Base on the Gareloch in Scotland on 3 April 1982, one day after the Argentine invasion. Conqueror arrived in the exclusion zone around the Falkland Islands 21 days later and was ordered to scan the area for Argentine shipping, particularly the aircraft carrier Veinticinco de Mayo ("25th of May").

On 30 April she detected, at a range of 100 nautical miles (190 km; 120 mi) on long range sonar, a task force of the Armada de la República Argentina (ARA-Argentine Navy). The taskforce was composed of the WWII-era ex-USN light cruiser General Belgrano, and two destroyers, ARA Piedra Buena and ARA Bouchard (both also ex-United States Navy vessels). General Belgrano was originally commissioned in 1938 but significantly modernised in 1960–62 with SPS 40 LRAW radar and SQS29 sonar. By the early 1980s the ARA were no longer receiving parts from the USA to maintain these systems, but the destroyers had recently been re-armed with French Exocet anti-ship missiles. The missiles were a real threat, unlike the 6-inch (150 mm) guns on General Belgrano which only had a range of 13 miles (21 km). The task force was sailing southwest of the Falklands, just outside the exclusion zone imposed by the British on all shipping. With Veinticinco de Mayo approaching the islands from the north, the commander of the British carrier battle group in the South Atlantic, Rear Admiral "Sandy" Woodward, feared a pincer attack, with General Belgrano attacking from the south and Veinticinco de Mayo from the north. Woodward requested permission from his superiors to sink General Belgrano.

After some debate, permission to engage General Belgrano was sent to the submarine from the Commander-in-Chief Fleet and Task Force commander, Admiral Sir John Fieldhouse, at the Royal Navy's command centre in Northwood in the United Kingdom. In the intervening period, General Belgrano had retired from her attack position and turned west, since Veinticinco de Mayo was not yet ready to engage the British fleet. This would cause some controversy, although General Belgrano's captain and the Argentine government acknowledged that the attack was a legitimate act of war.

On 2 May Conqueror became the first nuclear-powered submarine to sink an enemy surface ship using torpedoes, launching three Mark 8 torpedoes at General Belgrano and the destroyers, (Note: Conqueror was also equipped with Tigerfish torpedoes, but they had been found to be unreliable and her captain chose to use the more reliable, 55-year-old Mark 8 design) two of which struck the ship and exploded. Twenty minutes later, the ship was sinking rapidly and was abandoned by her crew. General Belgrano was unable to issue a Mayday signal because of electrical failure; this and poor visibility meant the two escorting destroyers were unaware of the sinking until some hours later. A total of 323 men were killed.

Adding to the confusion, the crew of Bouchard felt an impact that was the third torpedo striking or exploding in proximity to the hull, inflicting more than minor damage with 4 gashes in the hull (an examination of the ship later showed an impact mark consistent with a torpedo). The two ships continued on their course westward and began dropping depth charges. At the time, Conqueror's officers believed they were under attack and continued to regard the two Argentine destroyers as a serious threat to the British task force and later returned to search for the Argentine warships with the aim of sinking the destroyers rather than searching for Belgrano survivors. By the time the Argentine destroyers realised that General Belgrano had actually foundered it was already dark and the weather had worsened, scattering the life rafts. The sinking shocked the Argentine people and the ruling dictatorship.

Conqueror's war did not end there. The crew of the submarine had to face the Argentine Air Force which located the submarine's wake and her raised periscope on 7 May, apparently from a C130 Hercules 100 feet (30 m) overhead at peak light, of midday in the short Falklands sub-Antarctic day; the Argentine Air Force may have attacked the submarine then or later with US-type air-launched anti-submarine torpedoes in the days after the attack. Conqueror did not fire again for the remainder of the war, but helped the task force by using sophisticated monitoring equipment to track Argentine aircraft departing from the mainland.

After the war, Conqueror returned to Faslane, flying a Jolly Roger, a customary act of Royal Navy submarines after a kill. The flag, now in the Royal Navy Submarine Museum at Gosport, featured an atom for Conqueror being the only nuclear submarine with a kill, crossed torpedoes for the type of weapon used, a dagger indicating a cloak-and-dagger operation, and the outline of a cruiser for what kind of ship was sunk. When asked about the incident later, Commander Wreford-Brown responded, "The Royal Navy spent thirteen years preparing me for such an occasion. It would have been regarded as extremely dreary if I had fouled it up". It was to be the last submarine kill of the 20th century and the only one by a nuclear submarine until the sinking of IRIS Dena in March 2026 by the United States Navy's Los Angeles-class submarine USS Charlotte in the Indian Ocean during the Iran War.

=== Operation Barmaid ===
Later in 1982, Conqueror completed a raid to acquire a Soviet passive towed sonar array from its Polish-flagged towing vessel. The operation, a joint mission between British and American forces, was conducted on the boundary of Soviet territorial waters. Conqueror used cutters affixed to her bow to shear through the 3-inch (76 mm) thick wire before silently returning to her base on the Clyde.

=== Collision ===
On 2 July 1988 Conqueror was involved in a collision with the Army Sail Training Association yacht Dalriada south of the Mull of Kintyre. The yacht sank and four crew members were rescued.

=== Decommissioning ===
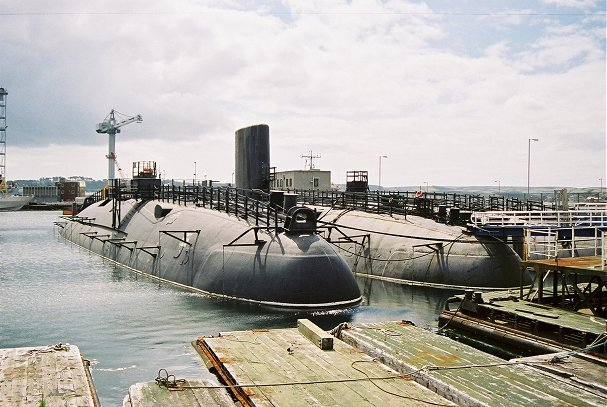
HMS Warspite (left) and HMS Conqueror (centre) with HMS Valiant (at rear) at HMNB Devonport Navy Days, 26 August 2006.

Conqueror was decommissioned in 1990 and the periscopes, captain's cabin and main control panel from the submarine's control room, and the Jolly Roger flag flown, are on display in the Royal Navy Submarine Museum in Gosport. As of 2019, Conqueror is one of over 20 nuclear submarines still held in storage by the Ministry of Defence, awaiting final disposal.
