= List of submarines on display =

This is a list of submarines on display around the world separated by country. This list contains all preserved submarines and submersibles on display, including submarine museum boats, that currently exist as complete boats or as significant structural sections.

This list does not contain replicas or wrecks. See List of ship replicas, List of shipwrecks and List of sunken nuclear submarines respectively.

== Australia ==
Name	Image	Location	Nationality	Class	Launch year	Coordinates	Remarks
HMAS Otway	Holbrook Submarine	Holbrook Submarine Museum, Holbrook	Australia	Oberon class	1966	35.7183°S 147.3172°E	
HMAS Ovens	HMAS Ovens, Fremantle	WA Maritime Museum, Fremantle	Australia	Oberon class	1967	32.0552°S 115.7389°E	
HMAS Onslow	HMAS Onslow alone	Australian National Maritime Museum, Sydney	Australia	Oberon class	1968	33.8690°S 151.1996°E	
M-21	M22 conning tower	Royal Australian Navy Heritage Centre, Sydney	Empire of Japan	Type A Kō-hyōteki class	1940	33.8598°S 151.2291°E	Conning tower
M-14 and M-21		Australian War Memorial, Campbell	Empire of Japan	Type A Kō-hyōteki class	1940	35.2805°S 149.1491°E	Composite of two submarines

== Brazil ==
Name	Image	Location	Nationality	Class	Launch year	Coordinates	Remarks
Riachuelo		Navy Cultural Centre, Rio de Janeiro	Brazil	Oberon class	1975	22.9004°S 43.1745°W	

== Bulgaria ==
Name	Image	Location	Nationality	Class	Launch year	Coordinates	Remarks
S-84 Slava		Museum of Glass, Beloslav	Bulgaria	Romeo class	1960	43.1947°N 27.7128°E	

== Canada ==
Name	Image	Location	Province	Nationality	Class	Launch year	Coordinates	Remarks
Ben Franklin		Vancouver Maritime Museum, Vancouver	British Columbia	United States	Research submersible	1968	49.277507°N 123.147265°W	
HMCS Ojibwa		Elgin Military Museum, Port Burwell	Ontario	Canada	Oberon class	1964	42.6468°N 80.8076°W	
HMCS Onondaga		Site historique maritime de la Pointe-au-Père, Rimouski	Quebec	Canada	Oberon class	1965	48.5169°N 68.4711°W	

== Chile ==
Name	Image	Location	Nationality	Class	Launch year	Coordinates	Remarks
O'Brien		Valdivia, Chile	Chile	Oberon class	1972	39.8159°S 73.2492°W	

== China ==
Name	Image	Location	Nationality	Class	Launch year	Coordinates	Remarks
Chinese submarine Changzheng 1		Qingdao Naval Museum, Qingdao	China	Type 091	1974	36.0558°N 120.3214°E	nuclear propulsion
Chinese submarine Changcheng 237		Qingdao Naval Museum, Qingdao	China	Type 033	1977	36.0555°N 120.3214°E	
Chinese submarine Changcheng 274		Taizhou Naval Museum, Taizhou	China	Type 033		32.2454°N 119.8912°E	
Chinese submarine Changcheng 279		Liugong Island, Shandong	China	Type 033	1980	37.5025°N 122.1695°E	
Chinese submarine Changcheng 280		Shanghai Oriental Land, Shanghai	China	Type 033		31.1047°N 121.0148°E	
Chinese submarine Changcheng 191		Huangpu Binjiang, Shanghai	China	Type 035		31.1963°N 121.4841°E	
Chinese submarine Changcheng 303		Wuhan Science and Technology Museum, Wuhan	China	Type 033	1977	30.5803°N 114.2964°E	
Chinese submarine Changcheng 349		349 Submarine Sightseeing Base, Jiaojiang	China	Type 033	1982	28.6896°N 121.3970°E	
Chinese submarine Changcheng Lüshunkou		Lushun Submarine Museum, Liaoning	China	Type 033		38.7942°N 121.2673°E	
Changcheng 353		Tianjin Binhai Theme Park, Tianjin	China	Type 035	1969	39.1581°N 117.8134°E	

== Croatia ==
Name	Image	Location	Nationality	Class	Launch year	Coordinates	Remarks
CB-20		Technical museum, Zagreb	Italy	CB class	1944	45.8041°N 15.9639°E	Formerly Mališan ( (Socialist Federal Republic of Yugoslavia) Yugoslavia)

== Denmark ==
Name	Image	Location	Nationality	Class	Launch year	Coordinates	Remarks
HMS E50		Sea War Museum Jutland, Thyborøn	United Kingdom	E class	1916	56.7066°N 8.2158°E	Conning tower
HDMS Springeren (S324)		Langelandsfort, Bagenkop	Denmark	Kobben class	1964	54.7497°N 10.7138°E	
HDMS Springeren (S329)		Aalborg Maritime Museum, Aalborg	Denmark	Delfinen-class submarine	1963	57.0584°N 9.8924°E	
HDMS Sælen		Royal Danish Naval Museum, Copenhagen	Denmark	Kobben class	1965	55.6868°N 12.6054°E	

== Estonia ==
Name	Image	Location	Nationality	Class	Launch year	Coordinates	Remarks
EML Lembit	Lembit	Estonian Maritime Museum, Tallinn	Estonia	Kalev class	1936	59.4532°N 24.7376°E	

== Finland ==
Name	Image	Location	Nationality	Class	Launch year	Coordinates	Remarks
Vesikko		Suomenlinna, Helsinki	Finland	Coastal submarine	1933	60.1426°N 24.9896°E	

== France ==
Name	Image	Location	Nationality	Class	Launch year	Coordinates	Remarks
Le Redoutable	Le Redoutable	Cité de la Mer, Cherbourg	France	Redoutable class	1967	49.6477°N 1.6172°W	Nuclear propulsion
Archimède		Cité de la Mer, Cherbourg	France	Bathyscaphe	1975	49.6477°N 1.6172°W	A dozen of research submarines are also located in the same building
FNRS III		Toulon, France	France	Bathyscaphe	1953		
Flore	Sous-marin La Flore à Lorient	Keroman Submarine Museum, Lorient	France	Daphné class	1964	47.7299°N 3.3718°W	
Espadon	Espadon mg 7836	Saint-Nazaire submarine base, Saint Nazaire	France	Narval class	1960	47.2754°N 2.1994°W	
Argonaute	Argonaute submarine @ Parc de La Villette @ Paris (28338705514)	Cité des Sciences et de l'Industrie, Paris	France	Aréthuse class	1958	48.8945°N 2.3895°E	
Alose	Alose french submarine 1907 02	COMEX headquarters, Marseille	France	Naïade class	1904	43.2395°N 5.4024°E	

== Germany ==
Name	Image	Location	Nationality	Class	Launch year	Coordinates	Remarks
Brandtaucher	Bundeswehrmuseum Dresden 7bis	Military History Museum, Dresden	German Confederation	Military submarine	1850	51.0785°N 13.7598°E	
U-1	U1-Gesamtansicht vom Heck her	Deutsches Museum, Munich	German Empire	U-boat	1906	48.1298°N 11.5833°E	
U-995	U995 Submarine, Kiel, Germany	Laboe Naval Memorial, Laboe	Nazi Germany	Type VIIC/41	1943	54.4124°N 10.2288°E	Formerly Kaura ( Norway)
U-2540	U-Boot Type XXI U-2540 ("Wilhelm Bauer")	Deutsches Schiffahrtsmuseum, Bremerhaven	Nazi Germany	Type XXI	1945	53.5414°N 8.5778°E	Formerly Wilhelm Bauer ( West Germany)
U-9 (S188)	Speyer U9	Technik Museum Speyer, Speyer	West Germany	Type 205	1966	49.3117°N 8.4475°E	
U-10 (S189)	S189 U-10, Wilhelmshaven, 2016 (01)	Deutsches Marinemuseum, Wilhelmshaven	West Germany	Type 205	1967	53.5135°N 8.1400°E	
U-11 (S190)	U 11 (Bundeswehr), 2013	U-Boot Museum, Fehmarn	West Germany	Type 205	1968	54.4191°N 11.1925°E	
U-434	Hamburg - U-Bootmuseum mit U-434 (2019)	U-Bootmuseum Hamburg, Hamburg	Soviet Union	Tango class	1976	53.5449°N 9.9550°E	Formerly B-515
U-461	Submarine U-461 Museum at Peenemünde, Germany	Maritim Museum Peenemünde, Peenemuende	Soviet Union	Juliett class	1962	54.1347°N 13.7665°E	Formerly K-24
HMS Otus	H.M.S Otus in Sassnitz-IMG 2286	Erlebnsiwelt U-Boot, Sassnitz	United Kingdom	Oberon class	1961	54.5118°N 13.6413°E	
HMS E24	Cuxhaven 2017 -HMS E24- by-RaBoe 056	Museum Windstärke 10, Cuxhaven	United Kingdom	E class	1915	53.8620°N 8.7069°E	Conning tower
U17 (S196)		Technikmuseum Sinsheim	West Germany	Type 206	1970		

== Greece ==
Name	Image	Location	Nationality	Class	Launch year	Coordinates	Remarks
HS Papanikolis	Conning tower of Papanikolis (Y-2)	Hellenic Maritime Museum, Athens	Greece	Katsonis-class submarine	1926	37.932498°N 23.645885°E	Sail
HS Okeanos	Memorial of Fallen Submarine Crew	Submarine Monument, Palaio Faliro	Greece	Okeanos-Class	1978	37.926733°N 23.688011°E	Sail

== India ==
Name	Image	Location	Nationality	Class	Launch year	Coordinates	Remarks
INS Kursura		RK Beach, Visakhapatnam, India	India	Kalvari class	1969	17.7173°N 83.3301°E	

== Indonesia ==
Name	Image	Location	Nationality	Class	Launch year	Coordinates	Remarks
KRI Pasopati		Indonesian Navy Submarine Monument, Surabaya	Indonesia	Whiskey class	1955	7.2654°S 112.7502°E	Formerly S-290 ( (Soviet Union) USSR)

== Israel ==
Name	Image	Location	Nationality	Class	Launch year	Coordinates	Remarks
INS Dakar		Clandestine Immigration and Naval Museum, Haifa	Israel	T class	1943	32.8302°N 34.9701°E	Conning tower
INS Gal		Clandestine Immigration and Naval Museum, Haifa	Israel	Gal class	1975	32.8301°N 34.9714°E	

== Italy ==
Name	Image	Location	Nationality	Class	Launch year	Coordinates	Remarks
Andrea Provana		Parco del Valentino, Turin	Kingdom of Italy	Barbarigo class	1918	45.0450°N 7.6837°E	Conning tower
Enrico Toti		Museo Nazionale della Scienza e della Tecnologia, Milan	Italy	Toti class	1967	45.4617°N 9.1710°E	
Ernico Dandolo		Museo Storico Navale Venezia	Italy	Toti Class	1967	45.43748443234684, 12.351908475609553	
Nazario Sauro		Galata - Museo del mare, Genoa	Italy	Sauro class	1976	44.4134°N 8.9239°E	

== Japan ==
Name	Image	Location	Nationality	Class	Launch year	Coordinates	Remarks
JDS Akishio	JMSDF AKISHIO	JMSDF museum & Kure Maritime Museum, Hiroshima, Kure	Japan	Yushio class	1985	34.2412°N 132.5558°E	
Shinkai		JMSDF museum & Kure Maritime Museum, Hiroshima, Kure	Japan	Deep-submergence vehicle	1970	34.241264°N 132.555003°E	
Ha-18	Current midget sub	Naval History Museum, Etajima	Empire of Japan	Type A Kō-hyōteki class	1938	34.2457°N 132.4731°E	
Shinkai 2000		Shin-Enoshima Aquarium, Enoshima Island, Fujisawa, Kanagawa	Japan	Deep-submergence vehicle	1981	35.309997°N 139.479339°E	

== Malaysia ==
Name	Image	Location	Nationality	Class	Launch year	Coordinates	Remarks
Ouessant		Submarine Museum, Klebang	Malaysia	Agosta class	1976	2.2104°N 102.1974°E	

== Monaco ==
Name	Image	Location	Nationality	Class	Launch Year	Coordinates	Remarks
Anorep 1		Oceanographic Museum of Monaco, Monaco-Ville	Monaco	Bathyscaphe	1966	43.7310°N 7.4258°E	

== Montenegro ==
Name	Image	Location	Nationality	Class	Launch year	Coordinates	Remarks
Heroj	Naval Heritage Collection 04	Naval Heritage Collection, Tivat	Montenegro	Heroj-class submarine	1967	42.437242°N 18.693611°E	

== Netherlands ==
Name	Image	Location	Nationality	Class	Launch year	Coordinates	Remarks
HNLMS Tonijn		Dutch Navy Museum, Den Helder	Netherlands	Dolfijn class	1965	52.9637°N 4.7712°E	

== Norway ==
Name	Image	Location	Nationality	Class	Launch year	Coordinates	Remarks
HNoMS Utstein (S203)		Royal Norwegian Navy Museum, Horten	Norway	Kobben class	1965	59.4257°N 10.4879°E	

== Pakistan ==
Name	Image	Location	Nationality	Class	Launch year	Coordinates	Remarks
PNS Hangor		Pakistan Maritime Museum, Karachi	Pakistan	Daphné class	1968	24.8850°N 67.0905°E	

== Peru ==
Name	Image	Location	Nationality	Class	Launch year	Coordinates	Remarks
BAP Abtao		Peruvian Naval Museum, Lima	Peru	Abtao class	1953	12.0596°S 77.1506°W	

== Portugal ==
Name	Image	Location	Nationality	Class	Launch year	Coordinates	Remarks
NRP Barracuda (S164)		Núcleo museológico da Marinha Portuguesa, Cacilhas	Portugal	Albacora class	1968	38.6868°N 9.1467°W	

== Russia ==
Name	Image	Location	State/Territory	Nationality	Class	Launch year	Coordinates	Remarks
K-3	K-3 submarine at the Museum of Naval Glory in Kronstadt, Jule 30, 2023	Museum of Naval Glory, Kronstadt	Northwestern	(Soviet Union) USSR	November-class	1957	59.9955°N 29.7369°E	First Soviet Nuclear Submarine
S-156	1382. Кронштадт. Мемориал Морякам-подводникам Балтики	Baltic Submariners Memorial, Kronstadt	Northwestern	(Soviet Union) USSR	Whiskey class	1953	59.9961°N 29.7787°E	Sail
D-2 Narodovolets	D-2 Narodovolets	Central Naval Museum, Saint Petersburg	Northwestern	(Soviet Union) USSR	Dekabrist class	1929	59.9328°N 30.2331°E	Guided tours
Dzhevetsky's Submarine	ПЛ Джевецкого 1	Central Naval Museum, Saint Petersburg	Northwestern	Russian Empire	Research submersible	1881	59.9302°N 30.2933°E	
S-189	С189 (2)	S-189 Submarine Museum, Saint Petersburg	Northwestern	(Soviet Union) USSR	Whiskey class	1954	59.9321°N 30.2754°E	
B-107	Marinesko museum 04	Museum of Russian Submarine Forces, Saint Petersburg	Northwestern	(Soviet Union) USSR	Foxtrot class	1964	59.9832°N 30.3991°E	Sail
B-413	Submarine B413 in Kaliningrad1	Museum of the World Oceans, Kaliningrad	Northwestern	(Soviet Union) USSR	Foxtrot class	1968	54.7065°N 20.4936°E	
Pisces VII		Museum of the World Oceans, Kaliningrad	Northwestern	Canada	Pisces-class DSRV	1976	54.706405°N 20.500063°E	
K-21	Подводная лодка К-21	Northern Fleet Naval Museum, Severomorsk	Northwestern	(Soviet Union) USSR	K class	1939	69.0810°N 33.4330°E	
B-440	B-440 Submarine in Vytegra	B-440 Submarine Museum, Vytegra	Northwestern	(Soviet Union) USSR	Foxtrot class	1970	60.9984°N 36.4338°E	
S-51	Памятник - panoramio (66)	Gremikha Naval base, Ostrovnoy	Northwestern	(Soviet Union) USSR	S class	1940	68.0647°N 39.4603°E	Sail
B-319	Рубка ДПЛ Б-319 «Комсомолец Чувашии» в Полярном	Victory Square, Polyarny	Northwestern	(Soviet Union) USSR	Tango class	1981	69.1966°N 33.4384°E	Sail
K-411 Orenburg	KS-411 in Koltushi	Defenders of the Fatherland Memorial, Koltushi	Northwestern	(Soviet Union) USSR	Yankee class	1970	59.9325°N 30.6535°E	Sail
K-141 Kursk	Морякам-подводникам погибшим в мирное время	Sailors who died in Peacetime Memorial, Murmansk	Northwestern	Russia	Oscar class	1994	68.9855°N 33.0942°E	Sail
B-396	Tango B-396 Moscow	Museum of the Navy, Moscow	Central	(Soviet Union) USSR	Tango class	1980	55.8525°N 37.4563°E	
L-3 Frunzenets	L-3 Museum	Victory Park, Moscow	Central	(Soviet Union) USSR	Leninets class	1931	55.7271°N 37.4989°E	Sail
Shch-307	ShCh-307 Museum	Victory Park, Moscow	Central	(Soviet Union) USSR	Shchuka class	1934	55.7261°N 37.4979°E	Sail
K-14	Памятник атомному подводному флоту	Pioneers of the Nuclear Fleet Memorial, Obninsk	Central	(Soviet Union) USSR	November class	1958	55.0992°N 36.6156°E	Sail
B-307	B-307, Togliatti. Russia-1	History of Equipment Park Complex, Tolyatti	Volga	(Soviet Union) USSR	Tango class	1980	53.5526°N 49.2467°E	
K-306	Рубка К-306 (Парк Победы, Уфа, 2018)	Victory Park, Ufa	Volga	(Soviet Union) USSR	Victor class	1968	54.8257°N 56.0550°E	Sail
K-403 Kazan	K-403 Kazan memorial (2023-07-12) 13	Victory Park, Kazan	Volga	(Soviet Union) USSR	Yankee class	1970	55.8315°N 49.1075°E	Sail
M-261	Музей военной техники Оружие Победы, Краснодар (07)	Weapons of Victory Museum, Krasnodar	Southern	(Soviet Union) USSR	Quebec class	1955	45.0211°N 38.9557°E	
Pisces XI		Baikal Museum, Listvyanka, Russia	Siberian	Canada	Pisces-class DSRV	1976	51.868041°N 104.832351°E	
S-56	053 - Wladiwostok 2015 (24130179580)	The Museum of Pacific Fleet, Vladivostok	Far Eastern	(Soviet Union) USSR	S class	1939	43.1134°N 131.8911°E	
K-430	K-430 Submarine Memorial Project 667AU Vladivostok Russia	Submariners of all Generations Memorial, Vladivostok	Far Eastern	(Soviet Union) USSR	Yankee class	1974	43.1113°N 131.9199°E	Sail
K-434	Рубка АПЛ К-434 Большой Камень 2015.06.27	The Ruble Monument, Bolshoy Kamen	Far Eastern	(Soviet Union) USSR	Yankee class	1970	43.1155°N 132.3588°E	Sail
K-506 Zelenograd	K-211 Petropavlovsk-Kamchatskiy and K-506 Zelenograd	Exploits of the Nuclear Fleet Memorial, Fokino	Far Eastern	(Soviet Union) USSR	Delta III class	1978	42.9091°N 132.3556°E	Sail

== Singapore ==
Name	Image	Location	Nationality	Class	Launch year	Coordinates	Remarks
Centurion		Singapore Navy Museum	Singapore	Challenger class	1967	1.3167°N 104.0168°E	Fin and Sail

== Slovenia ==
Name	Image	Location	Nationality	Class	Launch year	Coordinates	Remarks
Zeta (P-913)		Pivka Park of Military History, Pivka	(Socialist Federal Republic of Yugoslavia) Yugoslavia	Una class	1987	45.6670°N 14.1885°E	

== South Africa ==
Name	Image	Location	Nationality	Class	Launch year	Coordinates	Remarks
SAS Assegaai		South African Naval Museum, Simon's Town	South Africa	Daphné class	1970	34.19099°S 18.43753°E	

== South Korea ==
Name	Image	Location	Nationality	Class	Launch year	Coordinates	Remarks
Sang-O-class submarine		Unification Park, Gangneung	North Korea	Sang-O class	Unknown	37.7187°N 129.0044°E	

== Spain ==
Name	Image	Location	Nationality	Class	Launch year	Coordinates	Remarks
Delfín	Torrevieja - Museo Flotante, Submarino S-61 (3)	Museo del Mar y de la Sal, Torrevieja	Spain	Daphné class	1972	37.9725°N 0.6812°W	
Peral		Cartagena Naval Museum, Cartagena	Spain	Peral class	1889	37.59786°N 0.98725°W	
SA-42		Isaac Peral Base, Cartagena	Spain	Foca class	1963	37.6014°N 0.9924°W	
SA-52		Isaac Peral Base, Cartagena	Spain	Tiburón class	1966	37.6014°N 0.9925°W	
SA-51	Submarí Barcelona P1180788	CosmoCaixa, Barcelona	Spain	Tiburón class	1966	41.4141°N 2.1314°E	
SA-41	Submarine (SA 42)-Foca	Mahon Naval Station, Mahón	Spain	Foca class	1963	39.8939°N 4.2671°E	

== Sweden ==
Name	Image	Location	Nationality	Class	Launch year	Coordinates	Remarks
HSwMS Hajen		Marinmuseum, Karlskrona	Sweden	Holland class	1904	56.1612°N 15.5993°E	
HSwMS Neptun		Marinmuseum, Karlskrona	Sweden	Nacken class	1979	56.1612°N 15.5993°E	
HSwMS Nordkaparen		Göteborgs Maritima Centrum, Gothenburg	Sweden	Draken class	1961	57.7092°N 11.9596°E	
HSwMS U3		Teknikens och sjöfartens hus, Malmö	Sweden	Kustubat	1942	55.6051°N 12.9825°E	

== Switzerland ==
Name	Image	Location	Canton	Nationality	Launch year	Coordinates	Remarks
Auguste Piccard		Swiss Transport Museum, Lucerne	Lucerne	Switzerland	1964	47.0520°N 8.3370°E	
F.-A. Forel		La Maison de la Rivière, Tolochenaz	Vaud	Switzerland	1978	46.4928°N 6.4792°E	

== Turkey ==
Name	Image	Location	Nationality	Class	Launch year	Coordinates	Remarks
TCG Uluçalireis		Rahmi M. Koç Museum, Istanbul	Turkey	Tench class	1944	41.0413°N 28.9477°E	Formerly USS Thornback ( United States)
TCG Hızırreis		Gayret Gemi Museum, İzmit	Turkey	Tang class	1952	40.7601°N 29.9166°E	Formerly USS Gudgeon ( United States)
TCG Pirireis		İnciraltı Sea Museum, İzmir	Turkey	Tang class	1951	38.4123°N 27.03486°E	Formerly USS Tang ( United States)
SM UB-46		Dardanelles Naval Museum, Çanakkale	German Empire	Type UB II	1916	40.1471°N 26.3990°E	

== United Kingdom ==
Name	Image	Location	Nationality	Class	Launch year	Coordinates	Remarks
HMS Alliance	HMS Alliance S67	Royal Navy Submarine Museum, Gosport	United Kingdom	Amphion class	1945	50.7884°N 1.1197°W	Guided tours
HMS Holland 1	HMS Holland 1 1991	Royal Navy Submarine Museum, Gosport	United Kingdom	Holland class	1901	50.7880°N 1.1200°W	
HMS X24	X24 view from side	Royal Navy Submarine Museum, Gosport	United Kingdom	X class	1943	50.7880°N 1.1200°W	
Biber 105	Biberrsm	Royal Navy Submarine Museum, Gosport	Nazi Germany	Biber	1945	50.7880°N 1.1200°W	
LR3	Miniature submarine IMG 9230	Royal Navy Submarine Museum, Gosport	United Kingdom	DSRV	1990s	50.7880°N 1.1200°W	
HMS E17	E-17 conning tower	Royal Navy Submarine Museum, Gosport	United Kingdom	E class	1915	50.7881°N 1.1208°W	Conning tower
HMS Ocelot	HMS Ocelot (S17) by Mark.murphy	Chatham Historic Dockyard, Chatham	United Kingdom	Oberon class	1962	51.3955°N 0.5266°E	
HMS XE8 Expunge	Submarine XE8 Expunger bow	Chatham Historic Dockyard, Chatham	United Kingdom	XE class	1944	51.3967°N 0.5277°E	
HMS X51 Stickleback	X51 Stickleback duxford	Scottish Submarine Center, Helensburgh	United Kingdom	Stickleback class	1954	56.0052°N 4.7335°W	
HMS Courageous	HMS Courageous - geograph.org.uk - 604832	Devonport Naval Heritage Centre, Plymouth	United Kingdom	Churchill class	1970	50.3710°N 4.1814°W	
U-534	U 534 Surfaced u-Boat - geograph.org.uk - 1241994	Woodside, Merseyside, Birkenhead	Nazi Germany	Type IXC/40	1941	53.3951°N 3.0093°W	
Biber 90	Biber Submarine inIWM	Imperial War Museum Duxford, Duxford	Nazi Germany	Biber	1944	52.0967°N 0.1367°E	
Pisces III		Weymouth Sea Life Centre, Weymouth	Canada	Pisces-class DSRV	1970	50.625385°N 2.443843°W	Deepest rescue ever, saved its two divers in 1973
U-475 Black Widow	Russian Submarine, Strood - geograph.org.uk - 195243	River Medway, Strood	Soviet Union	Foxtrot class	1966	51.3955°N 0.5035°E	Museum closed

== United States ==
Name	Image	Location	State / Territory	Nationality	Class	Launch year	Coordinates	Remarks
USS Nautilus	USS Nautilus SSN571	Submarine Force Library and Museum, Groton	Connecticut	United States	Nautilus class	1954	41.3871°N 72.0882°W	
X-1	SS X-1 Midget Submarine	Submarine Force Library and Museum, Groton	Connecticut	United States	Midget submarine	1955	41.3876°N 72.0873°W	
Ha-8	Ha-8, Japanese midget submarine, Submarine Force Library & Museum, Groton, Connecticut	Submarine Force Library and Museum, Groton	Connecticut	Empire of Japan	Type A Kō-hyōteki-class	1938	41.3875°N 72.0871°W	
Siluro San Bartolomeo		Submarine Force Library and Museum, Groton	Connecticut	Kingdom of Italy	Human torpedo	1943	41.3875°N 72.0871°W	
USS George Washington	USS George Washington Sail	Submarine Force Library and Museum, Groton	Connecticut	United States	George Washington class	1959	41.3881°N 72.0865°W	Sail
NR-1	NR-1 986	Submarine Force Library and Museum, Groton	Connecticut	United States	Deep-submergence vehicle	1969	41.387661°N 72.087086°W	Sail
USS Flasher	USS Flasher Conning Tower	National Submarine Memorial, Groton	Connecticut	United States	Gato class	1943	41.3626°N 72.0834°W	Conning tower
DSV Turtle	Turtle DSV-3	Mystic Aquarium, Mystic	Connecticut	United States	Research submersible	1968	41.3733°N 71.9532°W	
Trieste II	Trieste II in 2023	Naval Undersea Museum, Keyport	(Washington (state)) Washington	United States	Bathyscaphe	1964	47.6999°N 122.6249°W	
DSRV-1 Mystic	DSRV-1 in 2023	Naval Undersea Museum, Keyport	(Washington (state)) Washington	United States	DSRV	1970	47.6999°N 122.6249°W	
USS Sturgeon	USS Sturgeon's sail	Naval Undersea Museum, Keyport	(Washington (state)) Washington	United States	Sturgeon class	1966	47.6996°N 122.6246°W	Sail
USS Parche (SSN-683)	USS Parche's sail	Harbourside Park, Bremerton	(Washington (state)) Washington	United States	Sturgeon class	1973	47.5632°N 122.6268°W	Sail
USS Triton	USS Triton's sail	USS Triton Submarine Memorial Park, Richland	(Washington (state)) Washington	United States	Triton class	1958	46.3487°N 119.2696°W	Sail
USS Woodrow Wilson	USS Halfbeak in 1967	Naval Base Kitsap, Bangor	(Washington (state)) Washington	United States	Lafayette class	1963	47.6936°N 122.7084°W	Sail
USS Ling	USS Ling in 2025	New Jersey Naval Museum, Hackensack	New Jersey	United States	Balao class	1943	40.8800°N 74.03971°W	currently not accessible to the public
USS Halfbeak		New Jersey Naval Museum, Hackensack	New Jersey	United States	Balao class	1946	40.8801°N 74.0403°W	Sail
Holland I	Holland 1	Paterson Museum, Paterson	New Jersey	United States	Research submersible	1878	40.9134°N 74.1789°W	
Fenian Ram	Fenian Ram	Paterson Museum, Paterson	New Jersey	United States	Research submersible	1881	40.9134°N 74.1789°W	
Intelligent Whale	Intelligent Whale	National Guard Militia Museum of New Jersey, Sea Girt	New Jersey	United States	Research submersible	1863	40.1291°N 74.0430°W	
USS Dolphin	USS Dolphin in 2024	Maritime Museum of San Diego, San Diego	California	United States	Research submersible	1968	32.7210°N 117.1737°W	
USS Pampanito	USS Pampanito	San Francisco Maritime National Historical Park, San Francisco	California	United States	Balao class	1943	37.8099°N 122.4164°W	
B-427 (Scorpion)	B-427	The Russian Scorpion Submarine, Long Beach	California	Soviet Union	Foxtrot class	1971	33.7532°N 118.1914°W	Museum permanently closed
USS Mariano G. Vallejo	USS Mariano G. Vallejo's sail	Mare Island Historic Park Foundation, Vallejo	California	United States	Benjamin Franklin class	1965	38.0990°N 122.2694°W	Sail
USS Baya		Vallejo Naval and Historical Museum, Vallejo	California	United States	Balao class	1944	38.1028°N 122.2563°W	Periscope
DSV-5 Nemo	DSV-5	U.S. Navy Seabee Museum, Port Hueneme	California	United States	Research submersible	1970	34.1699°N 119.1958°W	
Avalon (DSRV-2)		Morro Bay Maritime Museum, Morro Bay	California	United States	DSRV	1971	35.37003°N 120.85515°W	
USS Cavalla	USS Cavalla Panorama	Seawolf Park, Galveston	Texas	United States	Gato class	1943	29.3341°N 94.7787°W	
USS Tautog	Sail of USS Tautog	Seawolf Park, Galveston	Texas	United States	Sturgeon class	1967	29.3342°N 94.7782°W	Sail
Ha-19	Ha-19	National Museum of the Pacific War, Fredericksburg	Texas	Empire of Japan	Type A Kō-hyōteki-class	1938	30.2732°N 98.8679°W	
USS Pintado		National Museum of the Pacific War, Fredericksburg	Texas	United States	Balao class	1943	30.2733°N 98.8676°W	Conning tower
USS Croaker	USS Croaker	Buffalo and Erie County Naval & Military Park, Buffalo	(New York (state)) New York	United States	Gato class	1943	42.8781°N 78.8816°W	
USS Boston	Sail of USS Boston	Buffalo and Erie County Naval & Military Park, Buffalo	(New York (state)) New York	United States	Los Angeles class	1980	42.8777°N 78.8794°W	Sail
USS Growler	USS Growler with a SSM-N-8 Regulus	Intrepid Sea, Air & Space Museum, New York City	(New York (state)) New York	United States	Grayback class	1958	40.7650°N 73.9998°W	
USS Clamagore		Patriots Point Maritime Museum, Mount Pleasant	South Carolina	United States	Balao class	1945	32.7903°N 79.9075°W	Permanently closed
USS Lewis and Clark		Patriots Point Maritime Museum, Mount Pleasant	South Carolina	United States	Benjamin Franklin class	1964	32.7935°N 79.9044°W	Sail
H. L. Hunley	H.L Hunley in sodium hydroxide bath	Warren Lasch Conservation Center, North Charleston	South Carolina	(Confederate States of America) Confederate States	Military submarine	1863	32.8564°N 79.9587°W	
USS Becuna	USS Becuna	Independence Seaport Museum, Philadelphia	Pennsylvania	United States	Balao class	1944	39.9434°N 75.1411°W	
USS Requin	USS Requin	The Carnegie Science Center, Pittsburgh	Pennsylvania	United States	Tench class	1944	40.4451°N 80.0184°W	
USS Bowfin	USS Bowfin	USS Bowfin Submarine Museum, Pearl Harbor	Hawaii	United States	Balao class	1942	21.3687°N 157.9393°W	
USS Parche (SS-384)		USS Bowfin Submarine Museum, Pearl Harbor	Hawaii	United States	Balao class	1943	21.3551°N 157.9401°W	Conning tower
USS Silversides		USS Silversides Submarine Museum, Muskegon	Michigan	United States	Gato class	1941	43.2299°N 86.3327°W	
USS Tambor		Dossin Great Lakes Museum, Detroit	Michigan	United States	Tambor class	1939	42.3347°N 82.9854°W	Periscope only
USS Marlin	USS Marlin	Freedom Park, Omaha	Nebraska	United States	T-1 class	1953	41.2762°N 95.9011°W	
USS Omaha		Levi Carter Park, Omaha	Nebraska	United States	Los Angeles class	1976		Sail (Under construction)
Trieste	USS Trieste	National Museum of the United States Navy, Washington, D.C.	(Washington, D.C.) Washington, D.C.	United States	Bathyscaphe	1953	38.8731°N 76.9952°W	
USS Balao	USS Balao's Conning Tower	Washington Navy Yard, Washington, D.C.	(Washington, D.C.) Washington, D.C.	United States	Balao class	1942	38.8729°N 76.9986°W	Sail
USS Grayling		Portsmouth Naval Shipyard, Kittery	Maine	United States	Sturgeon class	1967	39.7444°N 105.0522°W	Sail
USS Sailfish	USS Sailfish's Conning Tower	Portsmouth Naval Shipyard, Kittery	Maine	United States	Sargo class	1938	43.0820°N 70.7385°W	Conning tower
USS Drum	USS Drum	Battleship Memorial Park, Mobile	Alabama	United States	Gato class	1941	30.6813°N 88.0167°W	
USS Razorback	USS Razorback	Arkansas Inland Maritime Museum, North Little Rock	Arkansas	United States	Balao class	1943	34.7521°N 92.2670°W	Renamed TCG Muratreis (Turkey)
U-505	U-505	Museum of Science and Industry, Chicago	Illinois	Nazi Germany	Type IXC	1941	41.7913°N 87.5812°W	Captured by the US Navy on June 4, 1944.
USS Torsk	USS Torsk	Historic Ships in Baltimore, Baltimore	Maryland	United States	Tench class	1944	39.2850°N 76.6087°W	
USS Lionfish	USS Lionfish	Battleship Cove, Fall River	Massachusetts	United States	Balao class	1943	41.7061°N 71.1629°W	
USS Albacore	USS Albacore	Albacore Park and Museum, Portsmouth	New Hampshire	United States	Research submersible	1953	43.0822°N 70.7669°W	
USS Cod	USS Cod	USS Cod Submarine Memorial, Cleveland	Ohio	United States	Gato class	1943	41.5100°N 81.6916°W	
USS Batfish	USS Batfish	War Memorial Park, Muskogee	Oklahoma	United States	Balao class	1943	35.7946°N 95.3107°W	
USS Blueback	USS Bluebell	Oregon Museum of Science and Industry, Portland	Oregon	United States	Barbel class	1959	45.5078°N 122.6668°W	
USS Cobia	USS Cobia	Wisconsin Maritime Museum, Manitowoc	Wisconsin	United States	Gato class	1943	44.0924°N 87.6555°W	
USS Nathanael Greene	USS Nathanael Greene's sail	41 for Freedom Memorial, Port Canaveral	Florida	United States	James Madison class	1964	28.4111°N 80.6025°W	Sail
USS George Bancroft	USS Bancroft	Naval Submarine Base Kings Bay, St. Marys	(Georgia (U.S. state)) Georgia	United States	Benjamin Franklin class	1965	30.7819°N 81.5757°W	Sail
USS James K. Polk	USS James K. Polk's Sail	National Museum of Nuclear Science & History, Albuquerque	New Mexico	United States	Benjamin Franklin class	1965	35.0656°N 106.5345°W	Sail
USS Hawkbill	USS Hawkbill	Idaho Science Center, Arco	Idaho	United States	Sturgeon class	1969	43.6341°N 113.2966°W	Sail
Bayou St. John submarine	Bayou St. John submarine	Louisiana State Museum, Baton Rouge	Louisiana	(Confederate States of America) Confederate States	Military submarine	Unknown	30.4539°N 91.1865°W	Hand-crank
USS Indianapolis	USS Indianapolis' Sail	Indiana Military Museum, Vincennes	Indiana	United States	Los Angeles class	1980	39.7770°N 86.1647°W	Sail
Ha-62-76	Ha-62-76	T. Stell Newman Visitor Center, Santa Rita	Guam	Empire of Japan	Type C Kō-hyōteki-class	1944	13.4223°N 144.6755°E	
Aluminaut		Science Museum of Virginia, Richmond	Virginia	United States	Research submersible	1964	37.5630406°N 77.4664215°W	

== See also ==
- Maritime museums
- List of museum ships
- List of ship replicas
- List of shipwrecks
- List of sunken nuclear submarines
