= Chinese submarine Changcheng 237 =

Type 033 diesel submarine

Coordinates: 36.0555706°N 120.3212870°E

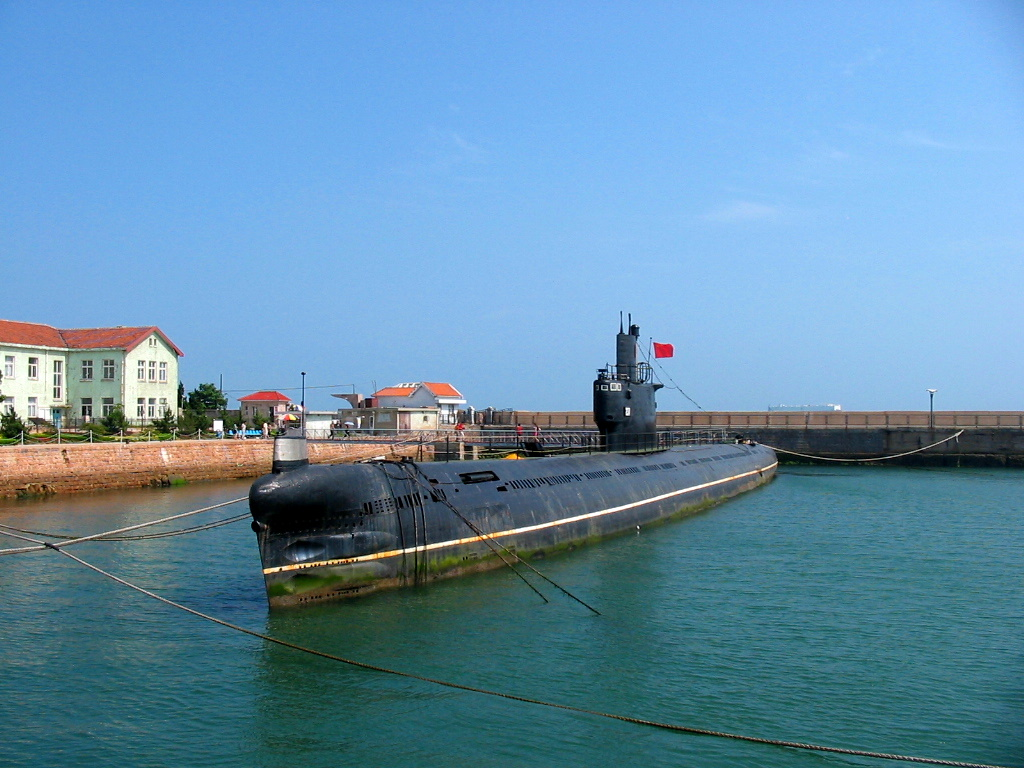
- Changcheng 237 in Qingdao on 16 July 2005

History

China
- Name: Changcheng 237; (长城237号)
- Builder: Huangpu Shipyard, Guangzhou
- Launched: 1977
- Commissioned: 1978
- Decommissioned: 1998
- Identification: Pennant number: 237
- Status: Museum ship at Qingdao Naval Museum, Qingdao

General characteristics
- Class & type: Type 033 submarine
- Displacement: 1,475 tons surfaced; 1,830 tons submerged
- Length: 76.7 m (251 ft 8 in)
- Beam: 6.7 m (22 ft 0 in)
- Draught: 5.2 m (17 ft 1 in)
- Propulsion: 2 × diesel engine; 2 × shafts
- Speed: 15.2 knots (28 km/h) (surfaced); 13 knots (24 km/h) (submerged)
- Range: 14,484 nmi (26,824 km; 16,668 mi)
- Complement: 54
- Electronic warfare & decoys: MRP 11-14
- Armament: 8 × 533 mm (21 in) torpedo tube; Yu-1 torpedo; Yu-4 torpedo

Changcheng 237 is a Type 033 submarine of the People's Liberation Army Navy.

== Development and design ==
Complete domestic production in China was achieved in 1967, and subsequently the project was renamed the Type 033. However, experience from deployment of completed boats in warmer climates proved that the original Soviet refrigeration and air conditioning system designed for subarctic and arctic area was woefully inadequate for subtropical and tropical regions, so redesigns were needed to improve refrigeration and air conditioning systems, and all boats to be stationed in tropical and subtropical regions went through such a refit. In September 1969 construction of new Type 033s, with improved air conditioning and refrigeration capability, began at Huangpu Shipyard in Guangzhou, eventually, 13 units were completed.

== Construction and career ==
She was launched in 1977 and commissioned in 1978.

Changzheng 237 was decommissioned in 1998. She now serve as a museum ship in Qingdao Naval Museum, Qingdao.

== Gallery ==
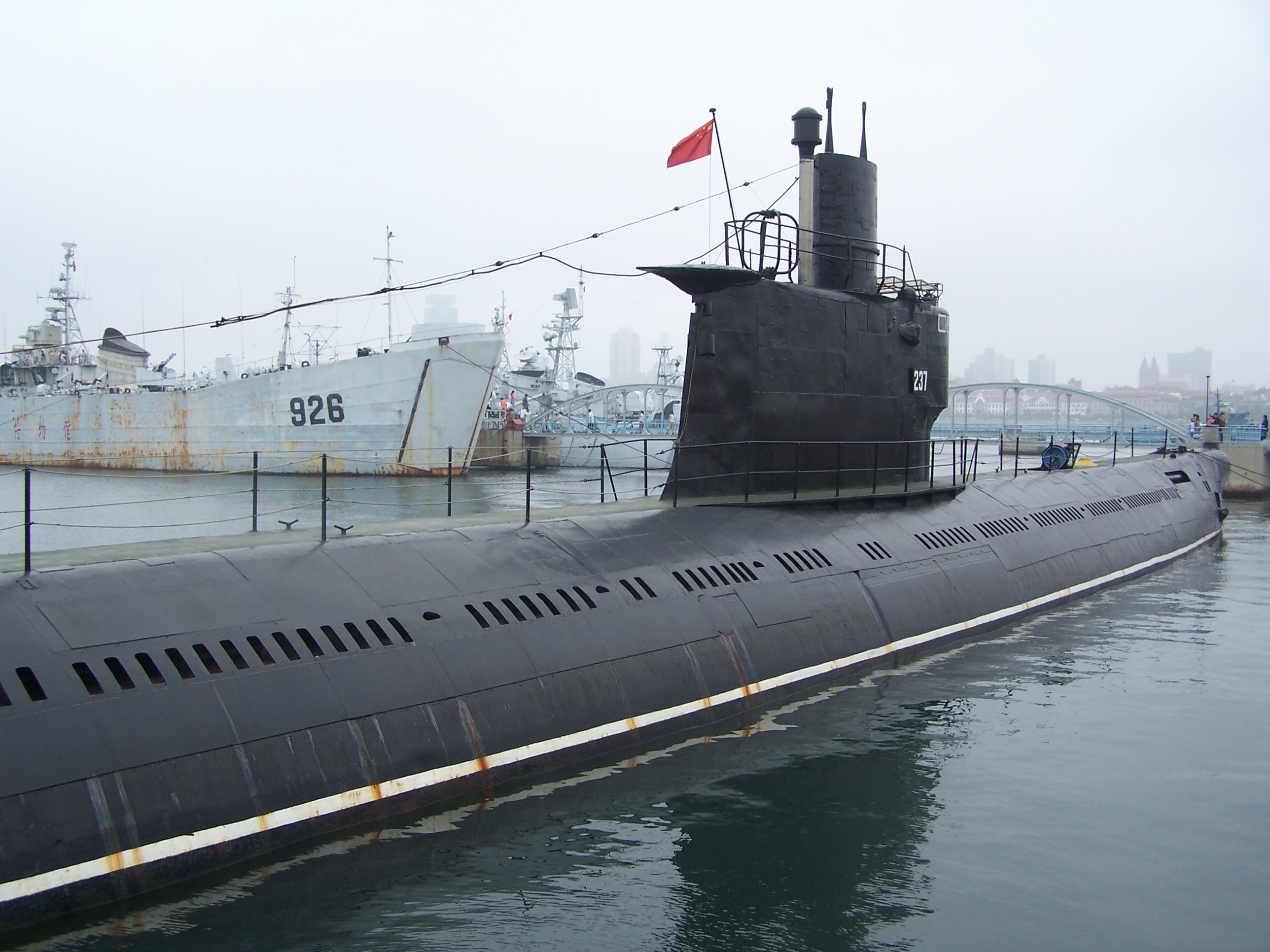
Changcheng 237 and Dabie Shan on 11 July 2006.
