= Slava class =

- Slava-class cruiser
- Romeo-class submarine (Slava class in Bulgarian use)
