= Yu-2 =

Yu-2 or Yu 2 may refer to:

- Yu-2 torpedo, a Chinese-built torpedo
- Japanese submarine Yu 2, an Imperial Japanese Army transport submarine of World War II
