= Chinese submarine Changcheng 303 =

Type 033 diesel submarine

Coordinates: 30.5802954°N 114.2963870°E

History

China
- Name: Changcheng 303; (长城303号)
- Builder: Huangpu Shipyard, Guangzhou
- Launched: 26 October 1977
- Commissioned: 21 April 1984
- Decommissioned: July 2009
- Home port: Yulin
- Identification: Pennant number: 303
- Status: Museum ship at Wuhan Science and Technology Museum, Wuhan

General characteristics
- Class & type: Type 033 submarine
- Displacement: 1,475 tons surfaced; 1,830 tons submerged
- Length: 76.7 m (251 ft 8 in)
- Beam: 6.7 m (22 ft 0 in)
- Draught: 5.2 m (17 ft 1 in)
- Propulsion: 2 × diesel engine; 2 × shafts
- Speed: 15.2 knots (28 km/h) (surfaced); 13 knots (24 km/h) (submerged)
- Range: 14,484 nmi (26,824 km; 16,668 mi)
- Complement: 54
- Electronic warfare & decoys: MRP 11-14
- Armament: 8 × 533 mm (21 in) torpedo tube; Yu-1 torpedo; Yu-4 torpedo

Changcheng 303 is a Type 033 submarine of the People's Liberation Army Navy.

== Development and design ==
Complete domestic production in China was achieved in 1967, and subsequently the project was renamed the Type 033. However, experience from deployment of completed boats in warmer climates proved that the original Soviet refrigeration and air conditioning system designed for subarctic and arctic area was woefully inadequate for subtropical and tropical regions, so redesigns were needed to improve refrigeration and air conditioning systems, and all boats to be stationed in tropical and subtropical regions went through such a refit. In September 1969 construction of new Type 033s, with improved air conditioning and refrigeration capability, began at Huangpu Shipyard in Guangzhou, eventually, 13 units were completed.

== Construction and career ==
She launched on 26 October 1977 and commissioned on 21 April 1984 into the South Sea Fleet.

Changzheng 303 was decommissioned in July 2009 and serve as a museum ship in Wuhan Science and Technology Museum, Wuhan. After being converted into a museum, she is painted with a big 303 number on the shell.

On the afternoon of October 10, 2009, she was towed by a tug from Sanya to Wuhan Port No. 21. After being refurbished, it was officially opened to the public on New Year's Day in 2010. Open and continue to play the remaining enthusiasm in the field of national defense education. The 303 boat is painted in gray and blue in the 1980s.
