= Chinese submarine Changcheng 349 =

Type 033 diesel submarine

Coordinates: 28.6896918°N 121.3970704°E

History

China
- Name: Changcheng 349; (长城349号)
- Builder: Huangpu Shipyard, Guangzhou
- Launched: 1980s
- Commissioned: 1982
- Decommissioned: 2011
- Identification: Pennant number: 349
- Status: Museum ship at 349 Submarine Sightseeing Base, Jiaojiang

General characteristics
- Class & type: Type 033 submarine
- Displacement: 1,475 tons surfaced; 1,830 tons submerged
- Length: 76.7 m (251 ft 8 in)
- Beam: 6.7 m (22 ft 0 in)
- Draught: 5.2 m (17 ft 1 in)
- Propulsion: 2 × diesel engine; 2 × shafts
- Speed: 15.2 knots (28 km/h) (surfaced); 13 knots (24 km/h) (submerged)
- Range: 14,484 nmi (26,824 km; 16,668 mi)
- Complement: 54
- Electronic warfare & decoys: MRP 11-14
- Armament: 8 × 533 mm (21 in) torpedo tube; Yu-1 torpedo; Yu-4 torpedo

Changcheng 349 is a Type 033 submarine of the People's Liberation Army Navy.

== Development and design ==
Complete domestic production in China was achieved in 1967, and subsequently the project was renamed the Type 033. However, experience from deployment of completed boats in warmer climates proved that the original Soviet refrigeration and air conditioning system designed for subarctic and arctic area was woefully inadequate for subtropical and tropical regions, so redesigns were needed to improve refrigeration and air conditioning systems, and all boats to be stationed in tropical and subtropical regions went through such a refit. In September 1969 construction of new Type 033s, with improved air conditioning and refrigeration capability, began at Huangpu Shipyard in Guangzhou, eventually, 13 units were completed.

== Construction and career ==
She launched in 1980s at Huagpu Shipyard in Guangzhou and commissioned in 1982.

Changzheng 349 was decommissioned in 2011 and serve as a museum ship in 349 Submarine Sightseeing Base, Jiaojiang. After being converted into a museum, she is painted with a big 349 number on the shell. She was the only retired submarine in Zhejiang Province that was approved by the People's Liberation Army General Armament Department of the People's Liberation Army in 2011 by the People's Government of Zhejiang Province.
