= Chinese submarine Changcheng 274 =

Type 6633 diesel submarine

Coordinates: 32.2454335°N 119.8913231°E

History

China
- Name: Changcheng 274; (长城274号)
- Builder: Huangpu Shipyard, Guangzhou
- Identification: Pennant number: 274
- Status: Museum ship at Taizhou Naval Museum, Taizhou

General characteristics
- Class & type: Type 6633 submarine
- Displacement: 1,475 tons surfaced; 1,830 tons submerged
- Length: 76.7 m (251 ft 8 in)
- Beam: 6.7 m (22 ft 0 in)
- Draught: 5.2 m (17 ft 1 in)
- Propulsion: 2 × diesel engine; 2 × shafts
- Speed: 15.2 knots (28 km/h) (surfaced); 13 knots (24 km/h) (submerged)
- Range: 14,484 nmi (26,824 km; 16,668 mi)
- Complement: 54
- Electronic warfare & decoys: MRP 11-14
- Armament: 8 × 533 mm (21 in) torpedo tube; Yu-1 torpedo; Yu-4 torpedo

Changcheng 274 is a Type 6633 submarine of the People's Liberation Army Navy.

== Development and design ==
Original Chinese built Romeo, China was to have assembled these Romeos from knock-down kits provided by the Soviet Union, 6 were planned, but only 2 were completed. The construction program came to a complete stop when the USSR stopped delivery of parts following the Sino-Soviet split. Construction of the 3rd unit at Wuhan was stopped, and available parts were diverted to complete the first pair, but many parts had to be developed indigenously. The primary improvement of Type 6633 over the original Soviet boats is the use of domestic Chinese batteries, which had slightly superior performance to that of the original Soviet batteries.

== Construction and career ==
Changzheng 274 was decommissioned and serve as a museum ship in Taizhou Naval Museum, Qingdao.
