= Site historique maritime de la Pointe-au-Père =

Coordinates: 48°31′03″N 68°28′08″W

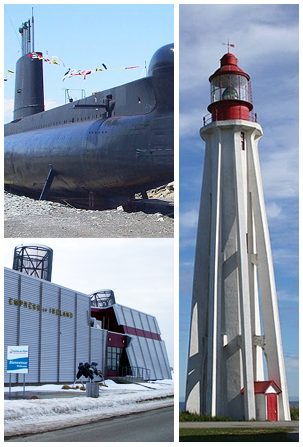
- Established: 1980
- Location: Rimouski, Quebec, Canada
- Type: Maritime museum
- Website: Official website

The Site historique maritime de la Pointe-au-Père (French pronunciation: [sit istɔʁik maʁitim də la pwɛ̃t o pɛʁ]) is a maritime museum located in Rimouski, Quebec, Canada, that displays 200 years of maritime history, and includes the first submarine open since 2009 to the public in Canada, HMCS Onondaga.

The second submarine open to the public since 2013 in Canada is HMCS Ojibwa, another of the same Oberon class in service of Canada.

== Collection ==
In 2008, the retired Canadian Forces Oberon-class submarine HMCS Onondaga was towed from Halifax, Nova Scotia to the museum, where it has become a museum ship. The exhibition of the museum ship also explains the lifestyle of submarine crew members, and includes an audio-guided tour.

The Empress of Ireland museum displays artifacts from the wreckage of the ocean liner RMS Empress of Ireland, which was sunk offshore in 1914.

The Pointe-au-Père navigational aid station, includes guided tours of the Pointe-au-Père Lighthouse, the keeper's house, foghorn shed, engineer's shed and other light station buildings.

== Affiliations ==
The museum is affiliated with: CMA, CHIN, and Virtual Museum of Canada.

== See also ==
- List of museum ships
- Ship replica
- Ships preserved in museums
