= HMCS Onondaga =

1965 Oberon-class submarine

Coordinates: 48.517°N 68.471°W

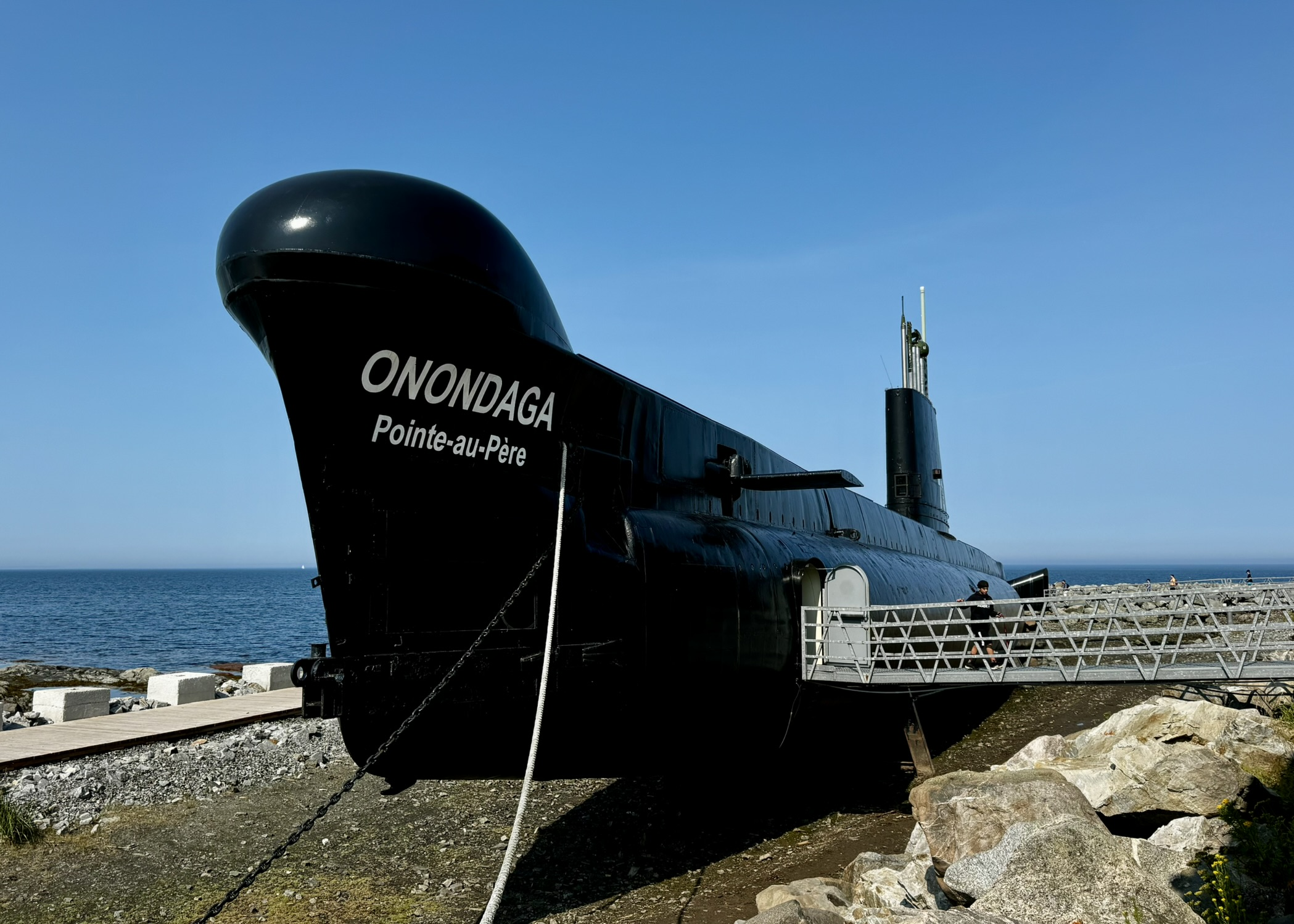
- Ex-Onondaga, on display in 2024

History

Canada
- Name: Onondaga
- Namesake: Onondaga First Nations people
- Builder: Chatham Dockyard, England
- Cost: CAN$16,000,000
- Laid down: 18 June 1964
- Launched: 25 September 1965
- Commissioned: 22 June 1967
- Decommissioned: 28 July 2000
- Motto: Invicta; ("Unconquered")
- Status: Preserved as museum vessel since 2008
- Badge: Blazon Azure, within a representation of the wampum of the Iroquois nation, another of the head of the mace used at the sitting of the first Parliament of Upper Canada in 1792, both proper.

General characteristics
- Class & type: Oberon-class submarine
- Displacement: Surfaced: 1,610 t (1,580 long tons); Submerged: 2,410 t (2,370 long tons)
- Length: 295.25 ft (89.99 m)
- Beam: 26.5 ft (8.1 m)
- Draught: 18 ft (5.5 m)
- Propulsion: 2 diesel electric engines
- Speed: Surfaced: 12 kn (22 km/h; 14 mph); Submerged: 17.5 kn (32.4 km/h; 20.1 mph)
- Range: 9,000 nautical miles (17,000 km; 10,000 mi)
- Endurance: 56 days
- Test depth: 120–180 metres (390–590 ft)
- Complement: 69
- Sensors & processing systems: Type 187 Active-Passive sonar; Type 2007 passive sonar
- Electronic warfare & decoys: MEL Manta UAL or UA4 radar warning
- Armament: 8 × 21 in (533 mm) tubes (6 bow, 2 stern), 18 torpedoes

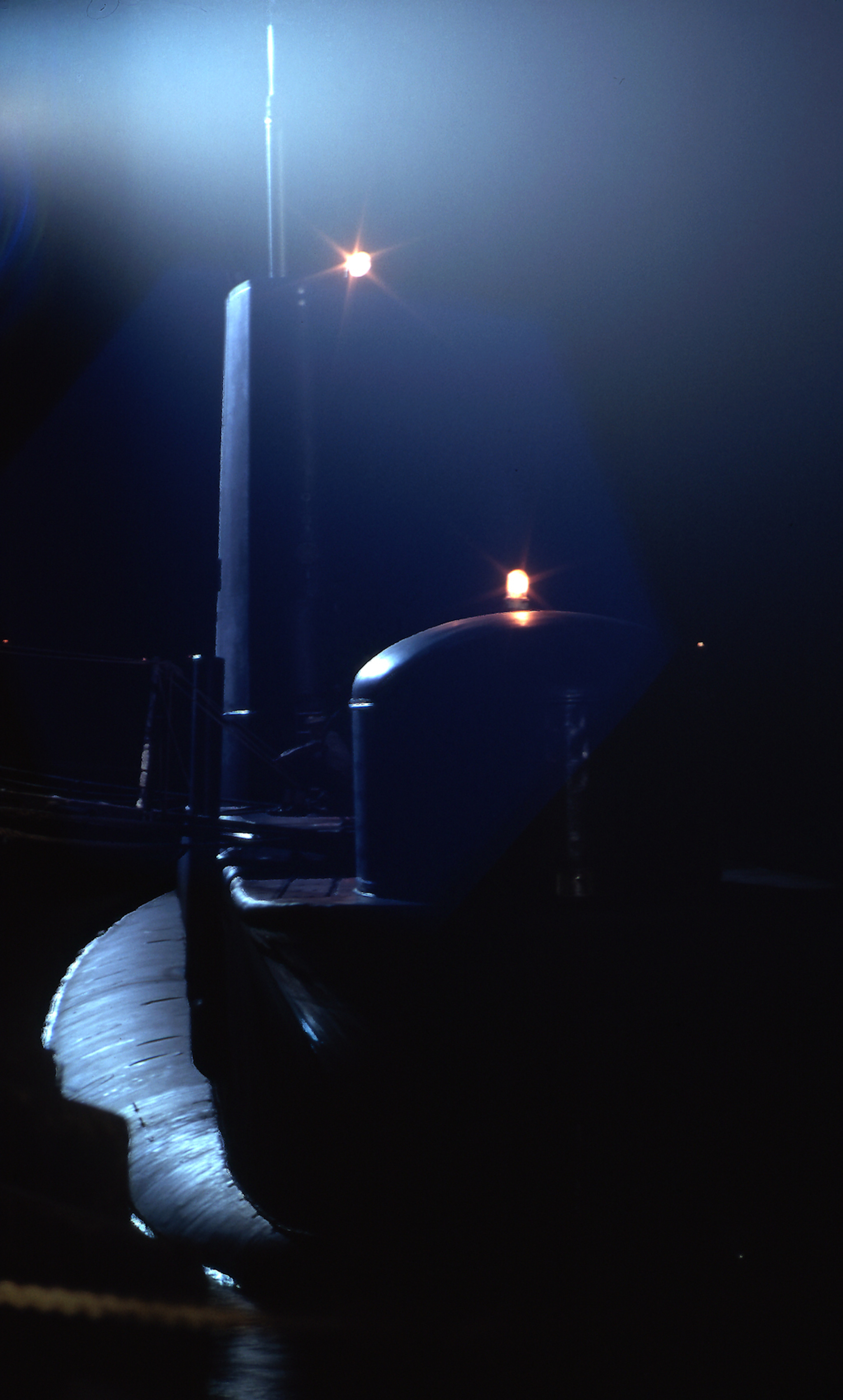
A Canadian Oberon-class submarine alongside in Roosey Roads for Operation Springboard, January 1969

HMCS Onondaga (S73) is a decommissioned Oberon-class submarine that served in the Royal Canadian Navy and later the Canadian Forces. Built in the mid-1960s, Onondaga operated primarily with the Maritime Forces Atlantic until her decommissioning in 2000 as the last Canadian Oberon.

Several plans for the disposal of the submarine were made and cancelled before the Site historique maritime de la Pointe-au-Père in Rimouski purchased the boat for preservation as a museum vessel. The submarine was moved into location during 2008, and is open to the public.

== Design and construction ==
The Oberon-class were considered an improved version of the preceding Porpoise-class submarines, with a different frame of the pressure hull and constructed from a better grade of steel. These build differences allowed the Oberons to have a deeper diving depth at roughly 1,000 feet (300 m).

The submarines displaced 2,030 tonnes (2,000 long tons) surfaced and 2,410 tonnes (2,370 long tons) submerged. They measured 295 ft 1/4 in (89.922 m) long with a beam of 26 ft 1/2 in (7.938 m) and a draught of 18 ft (5.5 m). (Note: Gardiner and Chumbley state that the dimensions were 241 ft (73 m) between perpendiculars, 290 ft 3 in (88.47 m) long overall with a beam of 26 ft 6 in (8.08 m) and a draught of 18 ft 3 in (5.56 m))

The boats were powered by a two-shaft diesel-electric system. The Oberons were equipped with two ASR 1 16-cylinder diesel engines creating 3,680 brake horsepower (2,740 kW) and two English Electric motors creating 6,000 shaft horsepower (4,500 kW). This gave the submarines a maximum surface speed of 12 knots (22 km/h; 14 mph) and a submerged speed of 17 knots (31 km/h; 20 mph). The boats carried 258 tons of oil giving them a range of 9,000 nautical miles (17,000 km; 10,000 mi) at 12 knots.

The design was armed with eight 21-inch (533 mm) torpedo tubes, six in the bow and two in the stern. They carried 24 reloads for a total of 30 torpedoes. Canadian boats differed from the original design by being equipped for the US Mark 37C torpedo. The longer, wire-guided Mod 2 version was carried in the forward tubes and the non-guided Mod 0 for the rear tubes.

The Oberons were equipped with Type 187 active-passive sonar, Type 2007 passive sonar and Type 2019 sonar.

=== Submarine Operational Update Program (SOUP) ===
By the late 1970s, the Oberons in Canadian service had become obsolete and were in need of an update. Planning was done in 1978 and the program approved in February 1979. In an effort to take the subs from anti-submarine warfare training to frontline service, Maritime Command developed a refit program that included new sonars, periscopes, communications and fire-control systems. They also had their armament upgraded with the fitting of torpedo tubes capable of firing the Mk 48 torpedo. This would allow the submarines to be deployed by NATO in the North Atlantic to monitor Soviet submarines.

The SOUP refits comprised a new US fire control system, a digital Singer Librascope Mark I, and new Sperry passive ranging sonar with the Type 719 short range sonar removed. The new sonar was placed in the upper casing on the pressure hull. New communications and navigational systems were installed. The submarines were fitted with new torpedo tubes for Mark 48 torpedoes, however the torpedoes themselves were considered a separate procurement program, which was only finalized in 1985.

Between 1980 and 1986, one of the Canadian Oberons was out of service undergoing the refit. SOUP came in on time and on its budget of C$45 million in 1986. SOUP kept the Canadian Oberons operating until the end of the 1990s when they were replaced by the British Upholder-class submarines.

== Acquisition ==
In March 1962, the Cabinet recommended the purchase of three Oberons and eight frigates, on the condition that the cost of acquiring the submarines from the United Kingdom would be offset by British defence purchases in Canada. On 11 April 1962, the purchase was announced in the House of Commons of Canada by the Minister of National Defence, Douglas Harkness.

However, the Conservative government postponed the acquisition of the Oberons due to the slow speed of the United Kingdom's attempt to offset the acquisition. The Conservative government was defeated in 1963 and the incoming Liberal government suspended all major defence procurement projects upon taking power. The final price of C$40 million for the entire contract was agreed upon in 1963.

Since Onyx was already under construction, the boat was finished to Royal Navy specifications. All three boats received modifications to the original Oberon design, which included the enlargement of the snort de-icer, a different weapons fit, a larger air conditioning unit, active sonar and different communications equipment. The second and third hulls were built to Canadian specifications, which moved the galley forward of the control room to make room for the sonar equipment. This led to the removal of three crew bunks, a problem that was never rectified in the submarines and led to an accommodation issue for the crew. The three submarines were acquired for service as "clockwork mice", submarines used to train surface vessels in anti-submarine warfare.

== Construction and career ==
The submarine, built at Chatham Dockyard in England, was laid down on 18 June 1964, and launched on 25 September 1965. She was commissioned at Chatham on 22 June 1967. The submarine was named after the Onondaga First Nations people, and was assigned the pennant number S 73. The submarine cost C$16,000,000.

Onondaga was assigned to Maritime Forces Atlantic (MARLANT) as part of the First Canadian Submarine Squadron and served nearly her entire career in the North Atlantic. Onondoga spent time training with the Royal Navy after an exchange program was instituted in the 1960s that would see submarines from both the Royal Navy and Royal Canadian Navy spend time with each other's forces. This allowed Canadian submarines on intelligence-gathering missions. Beginning in the 1970s, Canada began underwater surveillance patrols in the western Atlantic, tracking Soviet sub and surface fleet vessels, especially the ballistic missile submarines, usually in concert with a Canadair CP-107 Argus or Lockheed CP-140 Aurora patrol aircraft.

Onondoga arrived at HMC Dockyard at Halifax, Nova Scotia on 18 January 1982 in preparation for her SOUP refit. The refit began on 25 June 1983 and was completed on 27 April 1984. Following the SOUP refit and the introduction of the Mark 48 torpedoes, the Oberons were considered fully operational and counted the same as other offensive fleet units in Maritime Command.

Following the end of the Cold War, the Oberons were retasked, performing patrols on behalf of federal institutions such as the Department of Fisheries and Oceans and the Solicitor General of Canada between 1991 and 1994. For six months in 1994, the submarine served on the west coast. The delay of the introduction of the Victoria-class submarines led to the Oberons working past their life expectancy. During the Turbot War, the Oberons were tasked with monitoring European fishing fleets off the Grand Banks of Newfoundland. Their presence served as a deterrent in the escalating crisis.

Onondaga was decommissioned by Maritime Command on 28 July 2000. She was the last Oberon-class submarine operational in Canadian service. On decommissioning, Onondaga and her sister boats were left to await disposal in Halifax harbour.

== Preservation ==
In 2001, it was planned to cut Onondaga into pieces and reassemble her inside the Canadian War Museum. This plan was cancelled before the end of the year, because of the excessive cost. In May 2005 the Halifax Chronicle-Herald announced that Maritime Command was looking to sell Onondaga for scrap metal, along with three other Canadian Oberon's. MARCOM stated that the submarines were not in suitable condition to be used as museum ships, and predicted that each submarine would sell for between C$50,000 and C$60,000.

Instead of being scrapped, the submarine was purchased by the Site historique maritime de la Pointe-au-Père, Rimouski in 2006, for C$4 plus tax to become a museum ship. The submarine was towed from Halifax to Rimouski during the summer of 2008, floated onto a temporary marine railway, then hauled up the shore into the final position. Getting the submarine onto the marine railway required a high tide of 4.6 metres (15 ft), which would only occur during a 2-hour window on 2 August. The removal of torpedoes and batteries following decommissioning had significantly affected Onondaga's displacement, and 180,000 litres (40,000 imp gal; 48,000 US gal) of water had to be pumped into the ballast tanks before the submarine could be safely towed. Originally due to leave Halifax on 9 July, the tow was delayed by two days due to foul weather. One of the tow bridles snapped before the tugboat and submarine left the harbour, causing a half-day delay. On 12 July, submarine and tugboat were forced to divert via the Canso Canal to avoid Hurricane Bertha; a second tugboat was called in to help Onondaga traverse the locks.

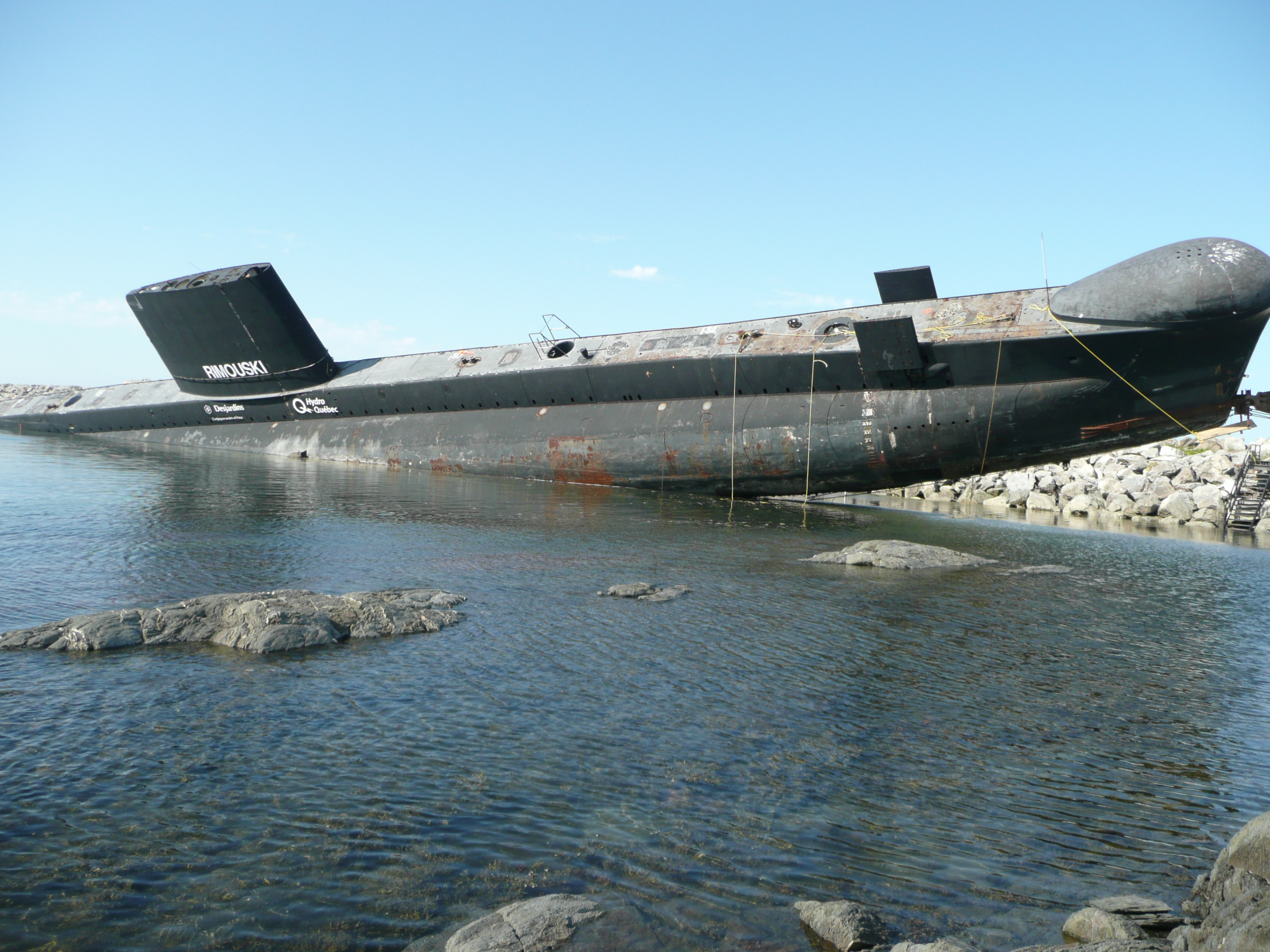
Following the second attempt to pull Onondaga out of the water, the submarine rolled off the marine railway

Onondaga arrived in Rimouski harbour on time for the 2 August high tide, but a heavy storm prevented the operation from occurring. The marine railway was extended further into the water to permit an attempt in September with a 4.3-metre (14 ft) tide. The second attempt succeeded in half-removing Onondaga from the water, but the submarine was not properly aligned with the support cradles. As the water receded overnight, the submarine rolled to the right and off the railway, puncturing the outer casing on a nearby boulder. A third attempt was made two weeks later, after the submarine was shored up and the cradles were replaced. Two tugboats were used to help position the submarine over the railway, but as the pull from shore started, one of the tugboats applied too much tension and pulled Onondaga back off. A fourth and final attempt was made on 28 November; after this, there were no more opportunities before winter struck and froze Rimouski harbour, further damaging the submarine. Onondaga was successfully removed clear of the water. The transportation and removal of Onondaga from the water was featured in the 'Supersize Submarine' episode of the Monster Moves documentary series.

After repairs and refurbishment, Onondaga and her attached museum, as a publicly accessible submarine, opened on 29 May 2009, with over 100,000 visitors in the first year.
