= USS LST-1008 =

1944 LST-542-class tank landing ship

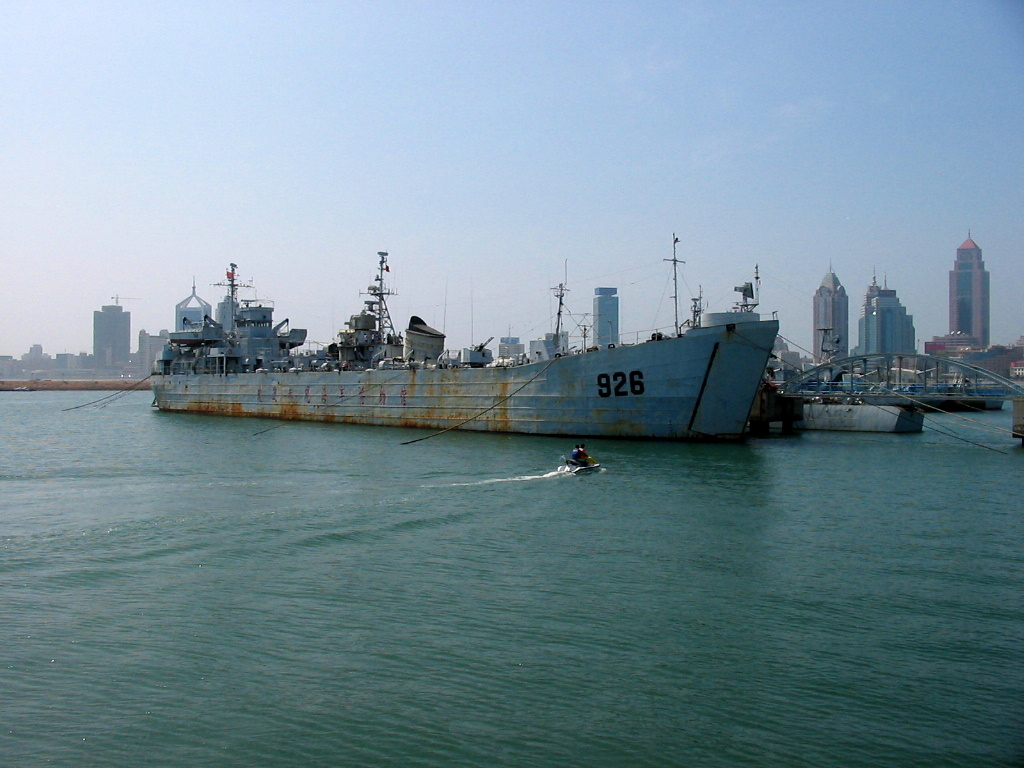
- LST-926 at Chinese Navy Museum on 16 July 2005

History

United States
- Name: LST-1008
- Builder: Bethlehem Steel Co., Quincy
- Laid down: 16 February 1944
- Launched: 23 March 1944
- Commissioned: 18 April 1944
- Decommissioned: 4 May 1946
- Stricken: 19 June 1946
- Fate: Transferred to Republic of China Navy, 19 June 1946

Republic of China
- Acquired: 19 June 1946
- Renamed: from Wanling and Zhong 112
- Fate: Seized by People's Liberation Army Navy, 1950

People's Republic of China
- Name: Dabie Shan; (大别山)
- Namesake: Dabie Shan
- Acquired: 1950
- Decommissioned: 14 April 1999
- Identification: Pennant number: LST-502/926
- Fate: Scrapped, ca.2005-2007

General characteristics
- Class & type: LST-542-class tank landing ship
- Displacement: 1,625 long tons (1,651 t) (light); 4,080 long tons (4,145 t) (full (seagoing draft with 1,675 short tons (1,520 t) load); 2,366 long tons (2,404 t) (beaching)
- Length: 328 ft (100 m) oa
- Beam: 50 ft (15 m)
- Draft: Unloaded: 2 ft 4 in (0.71 m) forward; 7 ft 6 in (2.29 m) aft; Full load: 8 ft 3 in (2.51 m) forward; 14 ft 1 in (4.29 m) aft; Landing with 500 short tons (450 t) load: 3 ft 11 in (1.19 m) forward; 9 ft 10 in (3.00 m) aft; Limiting 11 ft 2 in (3.40 m); Maximum navigation 14 ft 1 in (4.29 m)
- Installed power: 2 × 900 hp (670 kW) Electro-Motive Diesel 12-567A diesel engines; 1,800 shp (1,300 kW)
- Propulsion: 1 × Falk main reduction gears; 2 × Propellers
- Speed: 11.6 kn (21.5 km/h; 13.3 mph)
- Range: 24,000 nmi (44,000 km; 28,000 mi) at 9 kn (17 km/h; 10 mph) while displacing 3,960 long tons (4,024 t)
- Boats & landing craft carried: 2 x LCVPs
- Capacity: 1,600–1,900 short tons (3,200,000–3,800,000 lb; 1,500,000–1,700,000 kg) cargo depending on mission
- Troops: 16 officers, 147 enlisted men
- Complement: 7 officers, 104 enlisted men
- Armament: Varied, ultimate armament; 2 × twin 40 mm (1.57 in) Bofors guns; 4 × single 40 mm Bofors guns; 12 × 20 mm (0.79 in) Oerlikon cannons
- Aviation facilities: Deck as helipad

USS LST-1008 was an LST-542-class tank landing ship in the United States Navy during World War II. She was transferred to Republic of China and then taken over by People's Liberation Army and renamed Dabie Shan.

== Construction and commissioning ==
LST-1008 was laid down on 16 February 1944 at Bethlehem Steel Company, Quincy, Massachusetts. Launched on 23 March 1944 and commissioned on 18 April 1944.

== Construction and career ==
During World War II, LST-1008 was assigned to the Europe-Africa-Middle East and later Asiatic-Pacific theater. While in Europe, she participated in the assault of Normandy. From 8 to 9 June was disembarked at Easy White Beach. After the Normandy landing, she was assigned to the Far East as Occupation and China service from 1945 to 1946. On 24 May 1945, USS LCT-614 was hoisted aboard LST-1008 in Norfolk Navy Yard and on 16 September 1945, LCT-614 was launched from LST-1008 in Jinsen, Korea as part of Flotilla 15, Group 115.

She was decommissioned on 4 May 1946 and stricken on 19 June 1946. US State Department then transferred her to the Chinese National Relief and Rehabilitation Administration and later China Merchants Steam Navigation Company, serving in merchant service under the name Wanling and Zhong 112. In 1950, the People's Liberation Army found her abandoned in Shanghai. She was recommissioned into People's Liberation Army Navy after repair.

She sat at the Chinese Navy Museum as a museum ship in Qingdao, China from 1999 to 2005. From 2005 to 2007, she was towed for dismantling.

LST-1008 earned one battle star for World War II service.
