= Yu-2 torpedo =

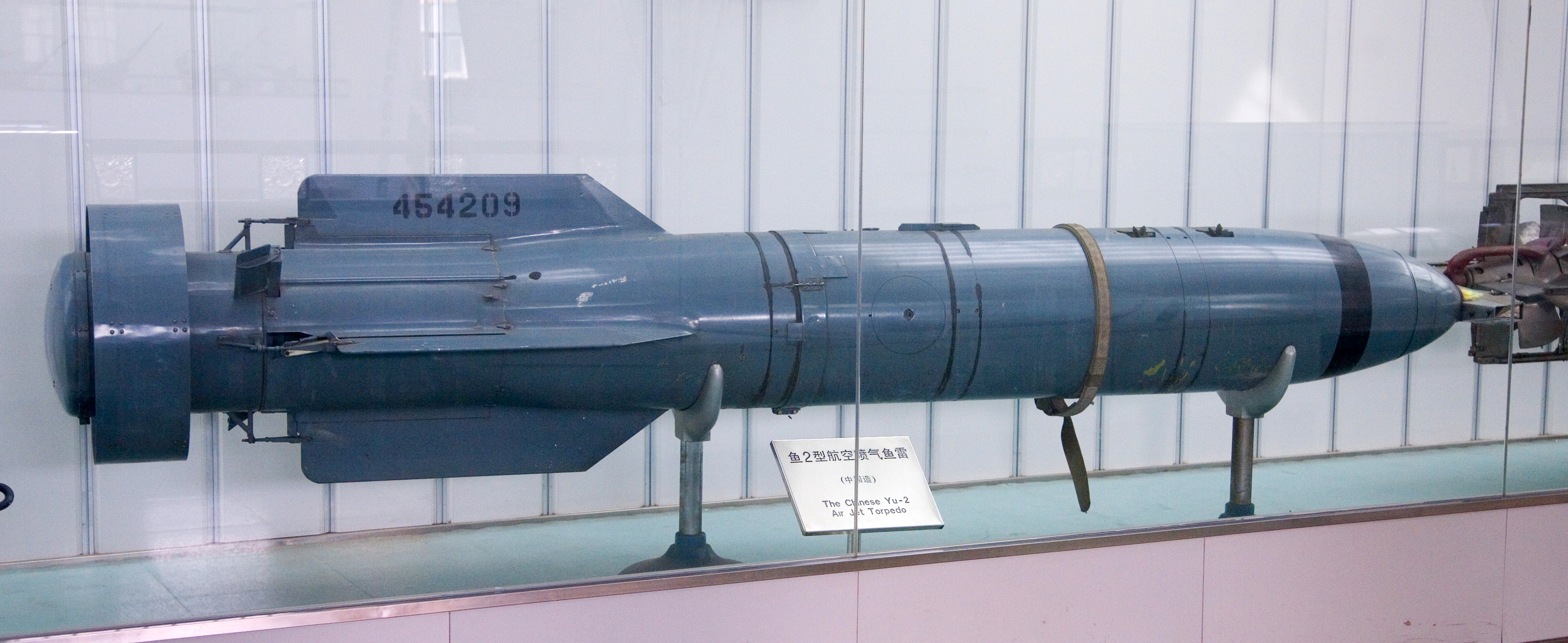
A Yu-2 Torpedo at the Beijing Military Museum.

Yu-2 (鱼-2, "Torpedo-2", 鱼 here refers to the initial character for "torpedo", 鱼雷/Yu lei in Chinese) torpedo was a Chinese development of the unguided straight-running Soviet ASuW RAT-52 torpedo with passive acoustic homing capability added. The historical background of Yu–2 is identical to that of Yu-1 torpedo and Yu-4 torpedo. Contrary to the higher number assigned, Yu-2 torpedo was the first Chinese domestically produced torpedo entering service, ahead of the Yu-1 torpedo.

== Background ==
In August 1958, the deputy chief-of-staff of PLA Zhang Aiping and the deputy commander-in-chief of PLAN Luo Shunchu led a military delegation to the Soviet Union and signed a deal with the Soviets to produce three types of torpedoes in China. In comparison with other military programs, each with dozens or even hundreds of Soviet advisers, the total number of Soviet advisers initially sent to China for these torpedo programs was just five. The Soviet Union quickly delivered the samples and technical information for the three types of torpedoes to China with the five advisers as promised. Two Soviet advisers were assigned to assist China to produce the RAT-52 rocket-powered torpedo at No. 123 Factory, while others were assigned to teach the Chinese about compressed-oxygen-powered torpedoes and SAET-50 acoustic homing torpedoes. In July 1960 the first two samples of Chinese-built rocket propelled torpedoes were completed. The type 920 electrical propulsion system and electronics of the passive acoustic homing torpedo had also been completed, while the basic technologies of compressed oxygen torpedoes were also mastered by the Chinese.

The subsequent Sino-Soviet split ended the promising future; from July 28 to September 1, 1960, the Soviet Union had quickly withdrawn all of its advisers from China. Compounding the problem were domestic political turmoils, such as the Great Leap Forward. The 7th Academy consequently ordered the 705th Research Institute to lead a team consisting of No. 724 Factory, Pinyang Machinery Factory (平阳机械厂) in Houma, Shanxi, and East Wind Instrumentation Factory (东风仪表厂) in Xi'an to indigenously manufacture Soviet-designed compressed-oxygen-powered torpedoes.

In 1962, Field Marshal Nie Rongzhen ordered resources to be concentrated on achieving the goal of fielding “two boats and a torpedo”. The two boats were a torpedo boat and a submarine, the torpedo being classed as a heavy torpedo of 533 mm diameter.

In July, 1962, researchers at 705th Institute concluded that compressed-oxygen-powered torpedoes were unsafe. After numerous accidental explosions, they were rarely used by either the Soviet or Chinese navy. Chinese researchers recommended steam power instead, and in the following year PLAN issued an order to first develop a steam-powered torpedo, and then the electrically powered acoustic homing torpedo.

Though the Yu-2 torpedo was not part of this project, due to its earlier commencement, it did benefit from it. One of the two torpedo factories China had set up in the 1950s was assigned as the primary contractor for the Yu-2. However, due to the political turmoil in China, the development of Yu-2 torpedo was subject to several changes. It was ultimately decided to develop two elements in parallel projects. The first project developed the unguided version of the torpedo. The second project developed micro-electronics for the acoustic-homing guidance package. When both were completed the two projects would be merged.

== Development ==
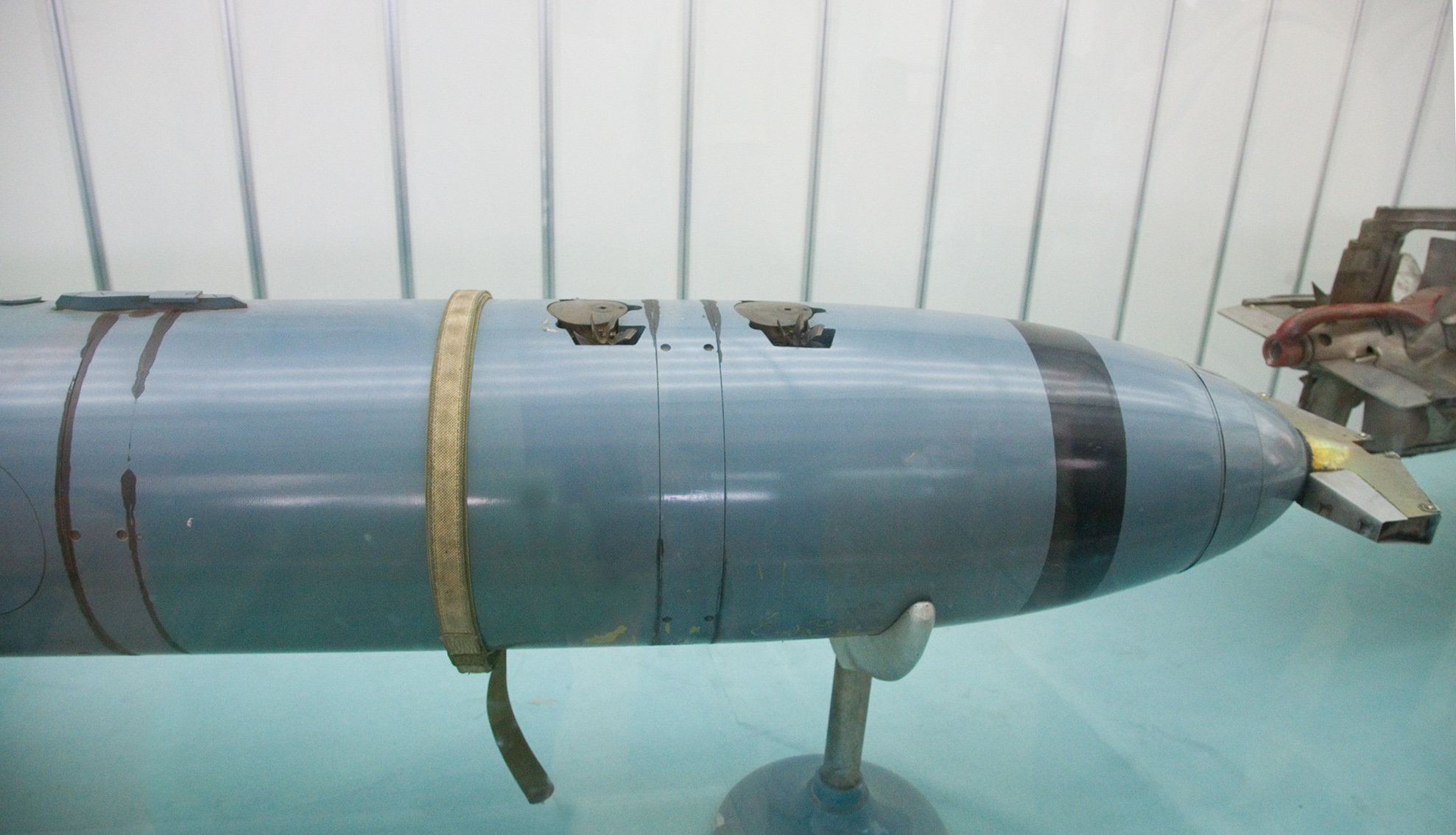
A Yu-2 Torpedo nose at the Beijing Military Museum.

China first imported the Soviet RAT-52 (RAT: Reaktivnaia Aviacionnaia Torpeda in Russian, meaning rocket airborne torpedo) rocket propelled ASW torpedo in 1954 and accumulated considerable experience in maintaining and handling the torpedo. With Soviet assistance in July, 1960, the first two examples of Chinese-built rocket propelled torpedoes were completed. Despite the Soviet withdrawal of technical assistance, a planned torpedo test was carried out in November, 1960 at Lushun. The result, however, was disappointing; not only that the test failed, one of the two torpedoes immediately sank upon entering water. Since China lacked any elaborate torpedo testing ranges the cause could not be determined. The development of Yu-2 torpedo was put on hold.

In 1964 the development of the Yu-2 torpedo resumed in China in No. 374 Factory. From July to September, 1969, a total of 24 torpedoes were test fired with satisfactory results, with speeds reaching 70 knots and ranges in excess of 1 km in water. From March to April, 1970, another 39 torpedoes were test fired.

Like the Yu-1 torpedo the Chinese micro-electronics industry was not capable of producing the passive acoustic-homing guidance package called for in the original specification. However, also like the Yu-1 torpedo the unguided version was pressed into service as the Yu-2. The acoustic homing version would come years later.

Two Yu-2 torpedoes could be carried by an Ilyushin Il-28 or a Nanchang Q-5. In comparison to the Soviet RAT-52 torpedo it was based on, the Yu-2 torpedo had twice the range in water but its warhead was 40 kg lighter. The speed of the Yu-2 torpedo is 40 / 70kt as opposed to the 58 / 68kt of Soviet RAT-52 torpedo.

Soviet researches have shown that a total of 8 direct hits of the RAT-52 torpedo would be enough to sink a 50,000 ton aircraft carrier. However, due to advances in naval air defenses, it was increasingly difficult for aircraft to come within weapons range of a target. The Chinese solution was to reduce the altitude of the approaching aircraft and attempt to postpone detection long enough to reach weapons range. However, RAT-52 torpedoes could not be dropped at low altitude. The Chinese solved this problem by incorporating additional control surfaces and modifying the winglets at the tail of the torpedo. Despite being now able to be dropped at very low altitude, incorporating passive acoustic-homing guidance, and having longer range underwater, Yu-2 torpedoes were obviously not suitable for modern warfare. Chinese research suggested that 8 direct hits on a 50,000 ton aircraft carrier was still able to guarantee the sinking, but under the intense air defense and acoustic countermeasures, a minimum of 58 Yu-2 torpedoes would have to be dropped. This in turn would require that a minimum of 29 aircraft successfully penetrate the fleet air defense. By 1984 all airdropped version of Yu-2 torpedoes were withdrawn from service.

== Modification ==
Production of new Yu-2 torpedoes ceased a long time ago, however thousands of Yu-2 torpedoes are undergoing conversion to mines as a coastal defense weapon. Newer electronics have been continuously adopted to upgrade the guidance. In the coastal defense role Yu-2 torpedoes have also been modified to launch from vehicles and fixed shore batteries and as part of the CAPTOR mine type mine system.

== Specification ==
- Diameter: 450 mm
- Length: 4 metre
- Weight: 627 kg
- Warhead: 200 kg
- Guidance: passive acoustic homing
- Propulsion: solid rocket
- Range: 5 km in air, 1 km in water.
- Speed: > 70 kt
- Depth: N/A, ASuW torpedo

== See also ==
- Export torpedoes of China
