= Romeo-class submarine =

Soviet diesel electric submarine

- Romeo-class submarine

Class overview
- Builders: Krasnoye Sormovo Shipyard, Gorky; Wuchang Shipyard (Wuhan); Guangzhou Shipyard (Canton); Jiangnan Shipyard (Shanghai); Bohai Shipyard (Huludao); Mayang-do Naval Shipyard (North Korea) - Assembly site of North Korean kits from China.
- Operators: Soviet Navy (Historical); People's Liberation Army Navy (Historical); Korean People's Navy; Bulgarian Navy (Historical); Syrian Navy (Historical); Egyptian Navy; Algerian National Navy (historical)
- Preceded by: Whiskey-class submarine
- Succeeded by: Foxtrot-class submarine; Type 035 submarine
- Completed: 133
- Retired: 109
- Preserved: 2

General characteristics
- Displacement: 1,475 tons surfaced; 1,830 tons submerged
- Length: 76.6 m (251 ft 3 in)
- Beam: 6.7 m (22 ft)
- Draught: 5.2 m (17 ft 1 in)
- Propulsion: Two diesels delivering 2.94 MW (4000 shp) with two electric motors driving two shafts.
- Speed: 15.2 knots (28.2 km/h) surfaced; 13 knots (24 km/h) submerged
- Range: 14,484km (9,000 miles) at 9 knots (17 km/h)
- Complement: 54 men (10 officers)
- Sensors & processing systems: sonar and radar
- Electronic warfare & decoys: MRP 11-14
- Armament: 8 × 533 mm (21 in) torpedo tubes. Six located in the bow and two in the stern.; 14 × 533 mm (21 in) anti-ship or anti-submarine torpedoes (including Yu-4 and Yu-1 torpedoes) or 28 mines

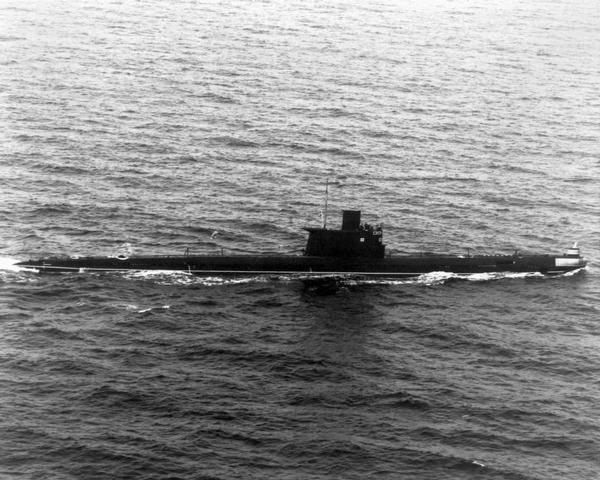
A Soviet Romeo-class submarine, 1986

The Project 633 class (known in the West by its NATO reporting name as the Romeo class) is a class of Soviet diesel-electric submarine, built between 1957 and 1961. A Chinese variant, Type 033, was built in China from 1962 to 1984.

== Project 633 ==
Project 633 was a further development of the Soviet navy's post-war 611 (Zulu-) and 613 (Whiskey-class) designs, which themselves were derivatives of the German Kriegsmarine Type XXI submarine. The project was undertaken by Lazurit Central Design Bureau of Gorky.

Only 20 of the Soviet Union's originally intended 56 were completed between October 1957 and the end of December 1961 because of the introduction of the nuclear submarine into the Soviet Navy.

By today's standards Romeo class submarines are considered obsolete, but they still have some value as training and surveillance vessels, they are in limited use with two navies today.

== Chinese Type 033 Romeo class and its variants ==
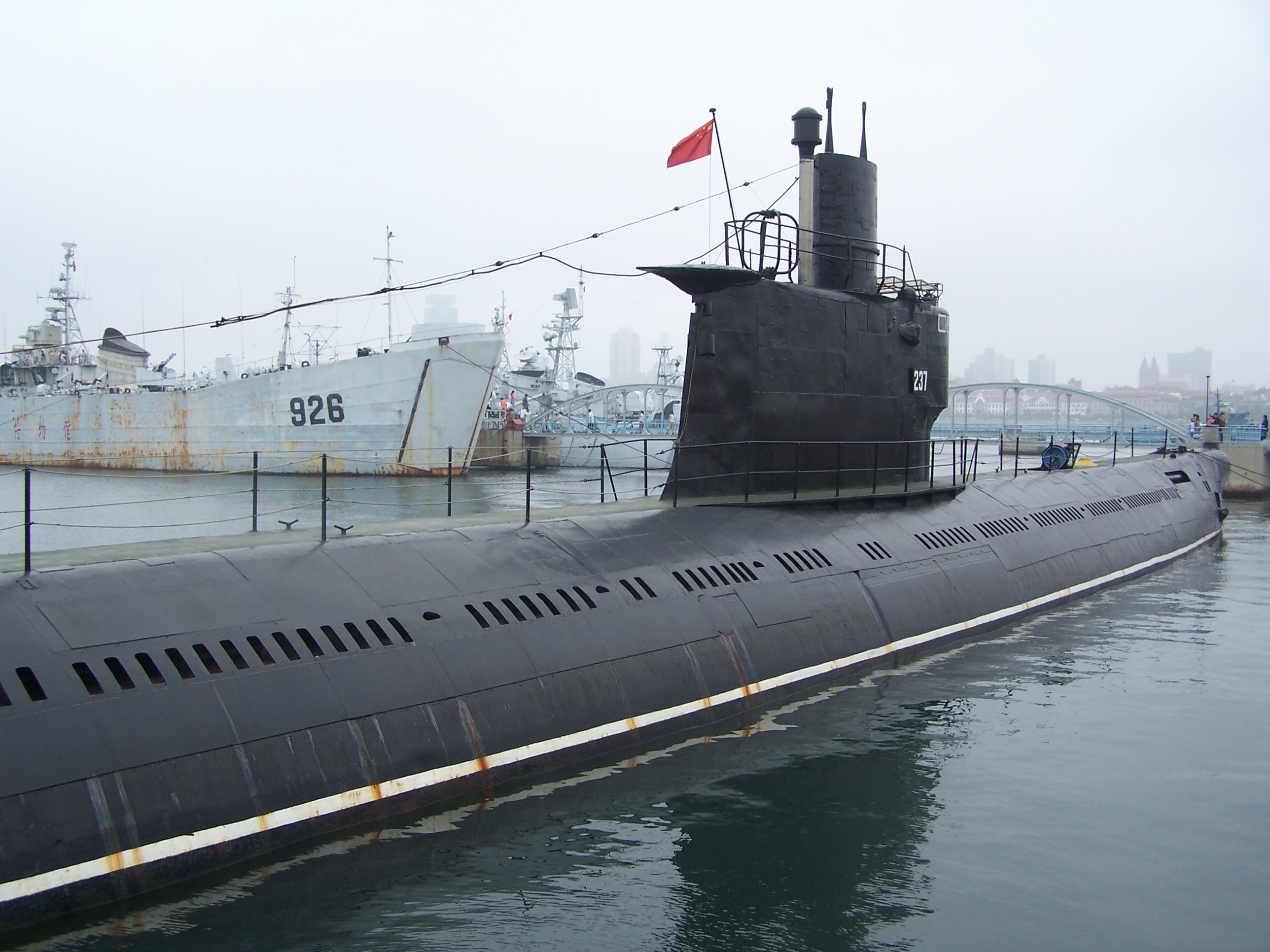
A Chinese Type 033 submarine

Under the 1950 Sino-Soviet Friendship and Mutual Assistance Treaty, the Soviets passed to China (and later to North Korea) the documentation necessary to produce Romeo submarines in 1963. The Chinese variant is known as the Type 033 Romeo. A total of 84 Type 033 submarines were built in China from 1962 to 1984, plus several exported to other countries.

The Chinese Type 033 incorporated some improvements over the original Romeo, Sonar on board was also continuously upgraded: the original Soviet sonar was first replaced by domestic Chinese Type 105 sonar, which consequently was replaced by H/SQ2-262A sonar built by No. 613 Factory. Today most of the Type 033 subs have been retired or preserved, with a few remaining in service for training purposes. A total of six Chinese Romeo-class submarine variants were developed:

- Type 6633: Original Chinese built Romeo, China was to have assembled these Romeos from knock-down kits provided by the Soviet Union, six were planned, but only two were completed. The construction program stopped when the USSR stopped delivery of parts following the Sino-Soviet split. Construction of the third unit at Wuhan was stopped, and available parts were diverted to complete the first pair, but many parts had to be developed indigenously. The primary improvement of Type 6633 over the original Soviet boats is the use of domestic Chinese batteries, which had slightly superior performance to that of the original Soviet batteries.
- Type 033: Complete domestic production in China was achieved in 1967, and subsequently the project was renamed the Type 033. However, experience from deployment of completed boats in warmer climates proved that the original Soviet refrigeration and air conditioning system designed for subarctic and arctic area was woefully inadequate for subtropical and tropical regions, so redesigns were needed to improve refrigeration and air conditioning systems, and all boats to be stationed in tropical and subtropical regions went through such a refit. In September 1969 construction of new Type 033s, with improved air conditioning and refrigeration capability, began at Huangpu Shipyard in Guangzhou, eventually, 13 units were completed.
- ES5A: Upgraded Type 033, with improvements mainly involving the replacement of equipment of Soviet origin with domestic Chinese systems, which includes: QZHA―10 (Type 779) attack periscope and QDYA―10 (Type 778) general purpose periscope. Addition of H/SQG-2 ranging sonar, Type 063 communication systems, and countermeasure systems. Domestic Chinese Type 801 sonar replaced the original Soviet MARS-24 sonar. The only difference between the Type 801 sonar and the MARS-24 sonar is that there are 24 transducer elements for the Type 801 as opposed to 12 in the original MARS 24, so the Chinese sonar had better accuracy. Domestic Chinese H/SQZ-D reconnaissance sonar (with Type 105 transducers) replaced the original Soviet system, the performance of the SQZ-D is almost identical to the original Soviet sonar it was developed from, except for the sector of scan, which is increased by 15 degrees. Additional noise reduction measures were also adopted. This is the type China originally sold to Egypt in the 1980s.
- Type 033G: Development of the ES5A, with the incorporation of the capability to launch acoustic homing torpedoes; analog computers installed to achieve automation of, and speeding up of, torpedo fire control calculations that were previously manually calculated. All Chinese Romeos were converted to this standard. The NATO reporting name for this type is rumored to be the Wuhan class.
- Type 033G1: A single Type 033G was modified to carry 6 YJ-1 (CSS-N-4) anti-ship missiles, this variant is called Type 033G1, with the rumored NATO reporting name of Wuhan A. The missile had to be fired while the boat was surfaced, with a total exposure time on the surface of less than 7 minutes. The most significant improvement, however, is the reduction of noise level by 12 dB.
- ES5B: Development of the Type 033G, primarily intended for export. This is an upgrade package for Romeo submarine users. The primary improvement of this class is the ability to launch wire guided torpedoes and anti-ship missiles (AShM) while submerged. The program originally began in the mid-1980s, and Egypt was reported to be the only customer when China won a contract to upgrade its Romeo-class submarine fleet, including both Soviet built and Chinese built units. This is the last type of Chinese Romeo class submarine; with noise reduction of 20 dB to 140 dB in comparison to the 160 dB of the original Soviet Project 633 submarines acquired by China.

== Operators ==
=== Current ===
- Egypt operates four of an original eight Romeo class submarines that are upgraded variants of the Chinese design.
- North Korea operates 20 Romeo class submarines. Seven were imported from China between 1973 and 1975, and the remainder locally assembled with Chinese supplied parts between 1976 and 1995. One apparently sank in an accident in 1985. Four Chinese imported units are based on the western coast.

=== Former ===
- Algeria had two Romeo class ex-Soviet Navy submarines: S-10 and S-11. Delivered in 1982 and in 1983, they were decommissioned in 1989 and scrapped.
- Bulgaria operated four Romeo class submarines (S-81 Pobeda, S-41 Viktoriya, S-83 Nadezhda, S-84 Slava). All have been decommissioned: Pobeda in 1990, Viktoriya in 1992, Nadezhda in 2008, and Slava in 2011. All but Slava were scrapped. Slava is conserved as a museum ship, moored at Beloslav.
- China has operated an estimated 84 of the Type-33 submarine (Romeo) during the Cold War.
- Russia and the Soviet Union had 20 Romeo class vessels in service. These vessels are no longer used as combat vessels in the Russian Navy, although one or two may used as immobile training facilities.
- Syria received three Romeo class submarines built in 1961 from the Soviet Navy: S-1, S-53, S-101. All were decommissioned in the mid 1990s and sold for scrap in 1996.

== Surviving boats ==
- Changcheng 237, in Qingdao Naval Museum, Qingdao
- Changcheng 274, in Taizhou Naval Museum, Taizhou
- Changcheng 279, in Liugong Island, Shandong
- Changcheng 280, in Shanghai Oriental Land, Shanghai
- Changcheng 303, in Wuhan Science and Technology Museum, Wuhan
- Changcheng 349, in 349 Submarine Sightseeing Base, Jiaojiang
- Changcheng Lüshunkou, in Lushun Submarine Museum, Liaoning
- S-49, in Pivdenna Bay, Sevastopol In August 2021, the "floating battery recharging station PZS-50 [formerly the submarine S-49) of project 633RV [was] being towed to a dry dock in Sevastopol for its repair" and to be turned into a museum. S-49 was decommissioned on 10 July 1995.
- Slava 84, in Museum of Glass, Beloslav
- The Hero Kim Kun Ok, aka Tactical Nuclear Attack Submarine No. 841, a modified Romeo-Class owned by the North Korean navy, which underwent modification in 2019, before being launched and unveiled in a ceremony on 6 September 2023.

== See also ==
- List of submarine classes in service

Equivalent submarines of the same era

- Barbel class
- Dolfijn class
- Foxtrot class
- Narval class
- Oberon class

== Notes ==
=== Bibliography ===
The Encyclopedia Of Warships, From World War 2 To The Present Day, General Editor Robert Jackson.
