= Yu-1 torpedo =

Yu-1 Torpedo
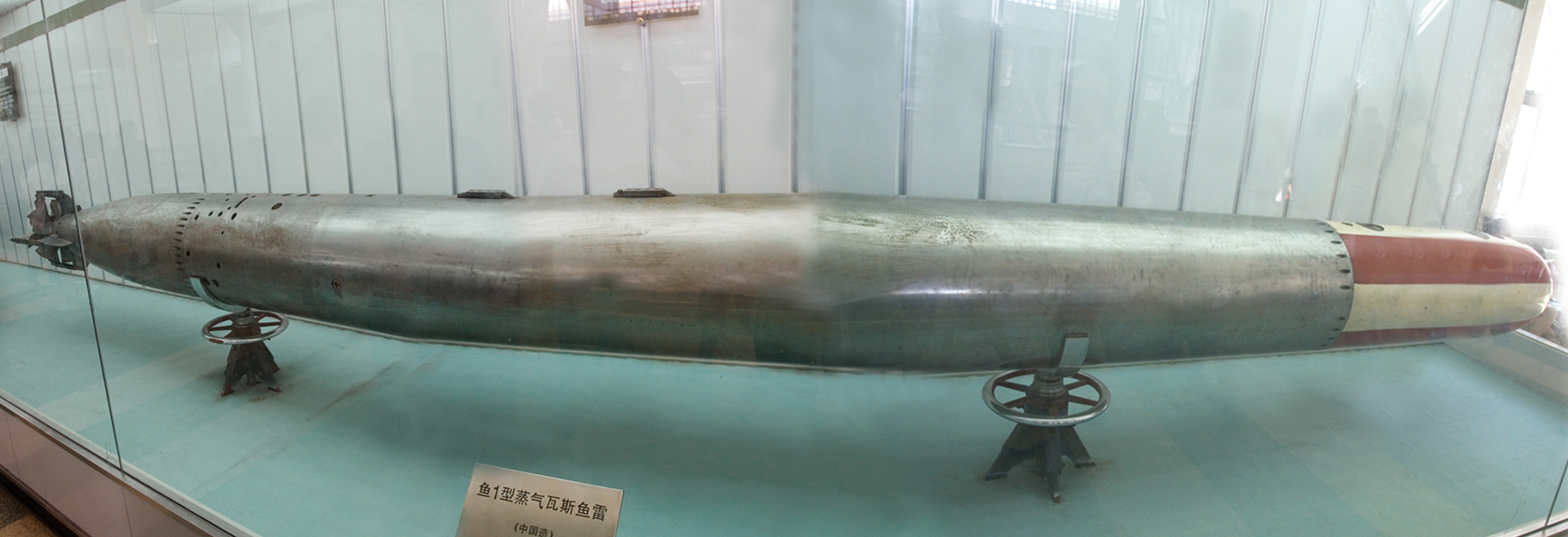
- A Yu-1 torpedo on display at the Beijing Military Museum
- Type: Steam-powered torpedo
- Place of origin: China

Service history
- In service: 1971-
- Used by: China, Albania, Romania, Pakistan, Tanzania

Production history
- Designer: Originally Soviet Union modified by Chinese
- Designed: late 1950s – early 1960s
- Manufacturer: China, Romania
- Produced: 1971 -

Specifications
- Mass: 2,000 kg
- Length: 7.8 m
- Diameter: 533 mm
- Warhead weight: 400 kg
- Engine: Steam
- Operational range: 3.5 km at 50 knots 9 km at 39 knots
- Maximum speed: 39 to 50 knots
- Guidance system: Straight running gyroscopic, later upgraded to passive acoustic homing

The Yu-1 (鱼-1) torpedo was the first Chinese-built steam-powered torpedo; it was a development of the unguided straight-running Soviet ASuW Type 53 torpedo. It was type classified in September 1971. The Yu-1 was actually the second domestically produced torpedo to enter Chinese service; the first was the Yu-2 torpedo. During the 1980s a version was developed with passive acoustic homing designated the Yu-1A.

== Development ==
In August 1958, the deputy chief-of-staff of People's Liberation Army (PLA) Zhang Aiping and the deputy commander-in-chief of People's Liberation Army Navy (PLAN) Luo Shunchu (罗舜初) led a military delegation to visit the Soviet Union and signed a deal with Soviets to produce three types of Soviet torpedoes in China. In comparison with other military programs each with dozens or even hundreds of Soviet advisors, however, Soviet Union did not put too much emphasis on the torpedo capability: the total number of Soviet advisors initially sent to China for all of its torpedo programs was only five. Soviet Union quickly delivered the samples and technical information of the three types of torpedoes to China with the five advisors to China as promised. Two Soviet advisors were assigned to assist China to produce the RAT-52 rocket-powered torpedo at No. 123 Factory, while others were assigned to teach China about compressed oxygen powered torpedo and SAET-50 acoustic homing torpedoes. In July 1960, the first two samples of Chinese-built rocket propelled torpedoes were completed. Type 920 electrical propulsion system and electronics of the electrically powered passive acoustic homing torpedo had also been completed, while the basic technologies of compressed oxygen torpedoes were also mastered by China.

The subsequent Sino-Soviet split ended the development relationship, and from July 28 to September 1, 1960, the Soviet Union withdrew its advisers. Compounding the problem, other domestic political turmoil such as Great Leap Forward further hindered the Chinese development of torpedoes. The 7th Academy consequently ordered the 705th Research Institute to lead a team consisted of No. 724 Factory, Pinyang Machinery Factory (平阳机械厂) in Houma, Shanxi, and East Wind Instrumentation Factory (东风仪表厂) in Xi'an to indigenously manufacture Soviet compressed oxygen powered torpedo. In 1962, Field Marshal Nie Rongzhen ordered all resources to be concentrated on achieving the goal of fielding “two boats and a torpedo” (Two boats: torpedo boat and submarine, torpedo: heavy torpedo of 533 mm diameter).

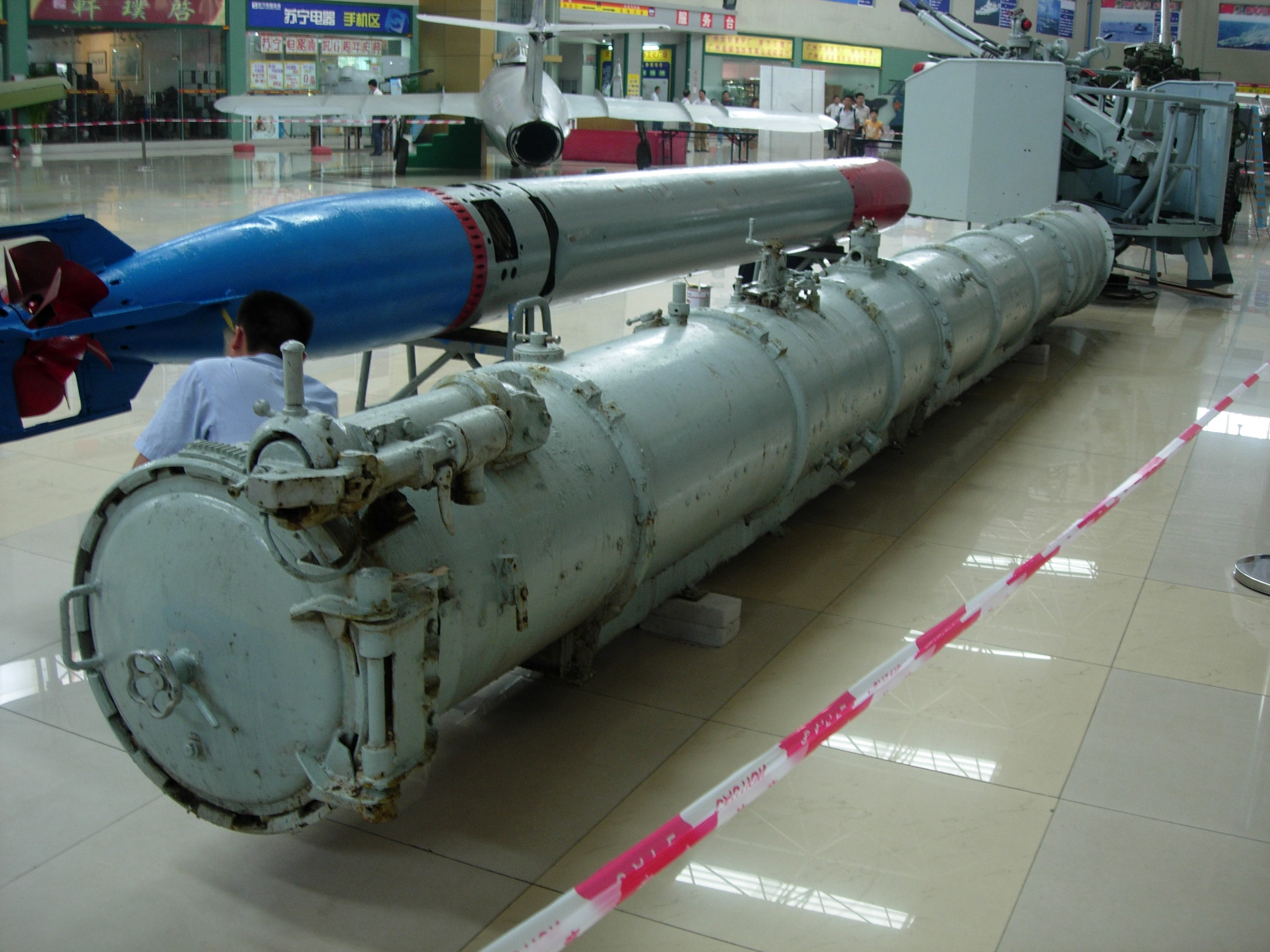
A museum exhibit of a Yu-1 together with a launch tube.

In July 1962, researchers at 705th Institute concluded that despite having samples and design drawings, compressed oxygen-powered torpedoes were unsafe and after numerous accidental explosions, they were rarely used by the Soviet Navy, and Chinese navy was not happy with oxygen powered torpedo either. Chinese researchers recommended a steam-powered torpedo instead, and in the following year, PLAN issued an order to first develop steam powered torpedo, and then the electrically powered acoustic homing torpedo. One of the two torpedo factories China had set up in the 1950s were assigned as the primary contractor. However, due to the political turmoil in China, the development of Yu-1 torpedo was changed several times, until it was finally decided to proceed in two portions in parallel, with the first portion to develop the unguided version torpedo, while the second portion was for microelectronics development for the acoustic homing guidance, and once both succeeded, they would be merged. The development of Yu-2 torpedo suffered a similar fate.

Chinese researchers decided that compressed oxygen powered torpedo was unsuitable for a number of reasons: Compressed Oxygen is highly volatile, and the logistical support required was costly and complex, additionally it required a highly trained crew.

Instead, Chinese researchers recommended the development of a steam-powered torpedo, which required less maintenance, cost less to produce, and the Chinese navy was already familiar with them. With the exception of slightly shorter range, the speed and other performance parameters of the steam powered torpedo were nearly identical to that of compressed oxygen powered torpedo.

General Liu Huaqing, the future commander-in-chief of the PLAN, was the head of the 7th Academy and agreed with the Chinese researchers and ordered two samples to be produced in 30 months, with the 705th Research Institute as the primary contractor. Since there were no design information available, Chinese had to reverse-engineer the Soviet steam-powered Type 53 torpedo by taking apart two Soviet samples sold to China. Compounding the problem, the No. 50 Factory of the 705th Institute was only a small factory of 200 employees, and lacked both the necessary equipment and experts needed for the job. The 7th Academy made a top priority in 1963 to order machine tools for the torpedo factory, while with the approvals of both the National Science and Technology Committee and the National Defense Science and Technology Committee, over two dozen experts including the best machine tool operators were assigned to the torpedo factory from other areas including Nanjing.

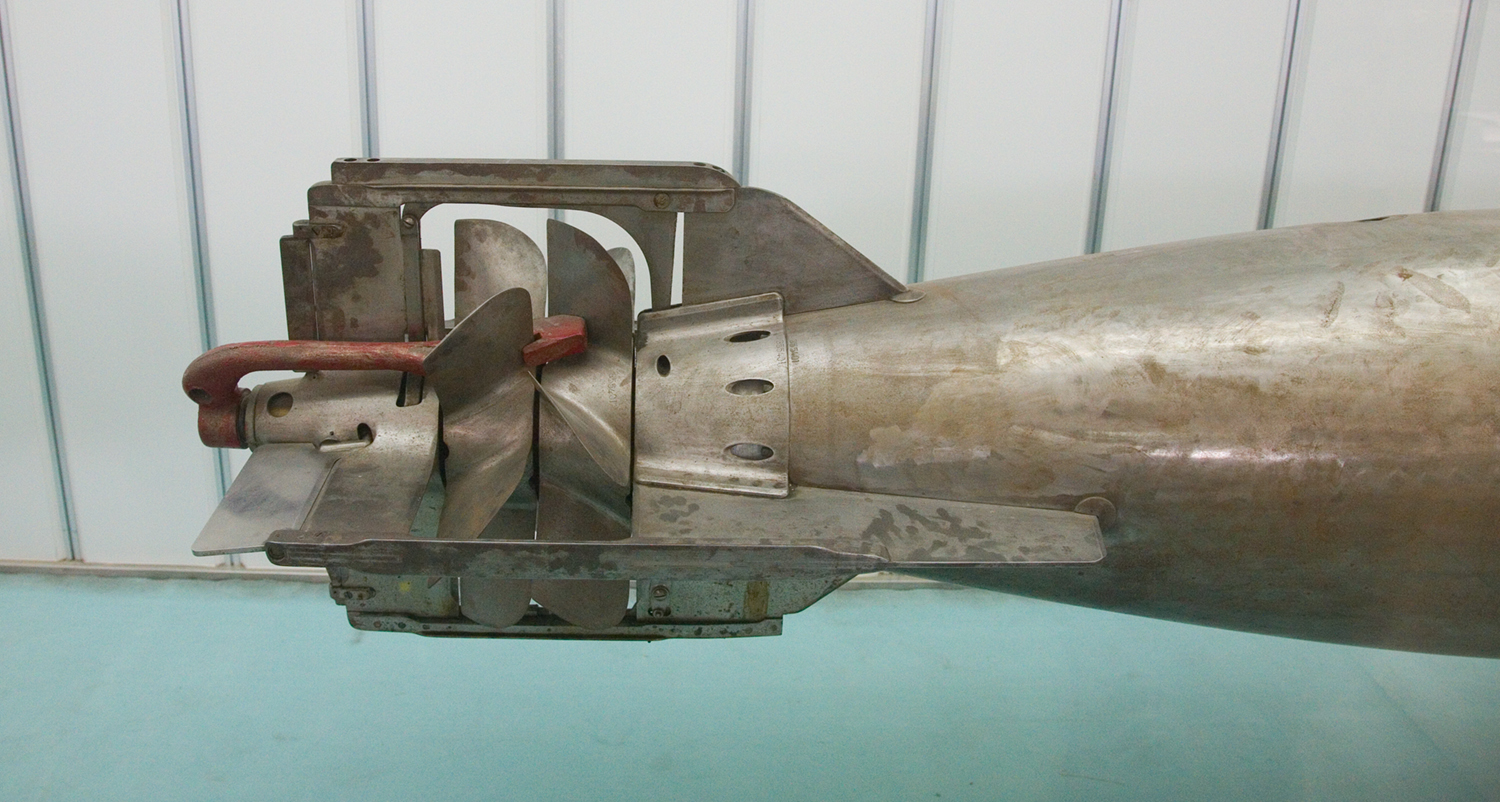
The contra-rotating propeller section of a Yu-1.

The propulsion system was the critical factor affecting the speed and the range of the torpedo. The Soviet Type 53 steam-powered torpedo was powered by a reciprocating engine and the cylinder of the engine had to sustain tremendous pressure. The only way to build cylinders that meet the requirement was to use a brand-new method to cast a newly developed copper alloy, which took the joint effort of a total of 40 enterprises with more than several dozen attempts until they were successful. The depth controls of the torpedo proved to be another problem and it took 30 days continuous work and 54 failures before the Chinese had finally master the heat treatment process of the depth controls.

During the development, senior workers on the production line with great experience had contributed as much as technicians and engineers. For example, Mr. Zhao Zhongfa (赵忠发) made critical inputs that were instrumental in successful production techniques.

By the third quarter of 1964, all eight major subsystems of the propulsion systems were completed, so were the directional and depth control systems. By the fourth quarter of 1964, all 18 individual components and subsystems had been successfully developed by No. 50 Factory of the 705th Institute, half a year ahead of schedule.

Capitalizing on the success, Luo Chuanli (骆传骊) of the 705th Institute led a team of researchers to Pinyang Machinery Factory (平阳机械厂) in Houma, Shanxi, to assist the general design engineer Li Fengku (李风库) and his team of the factory to speed up the next stage of the development. In the meantime, 705th Institute and East Wind Instrumentation Factory (东风仪表厂) in Xi'an jointly developed the gyroscope for the torpedo.

In 1965, the first sample was built and subsequently, over 100 samples were tested, but due to the rudimentary testing range at the time, it was difficult to evaluate the performance of the torpedoes based on the very limited test data, and further tests were required. What was revealed by the end of the test in March 1966, however, was that there were three confirmed problems: the torpedo engine would sometimes stop when traveling at 2 metres depth, efficiency of the propulsion system was not as stable as desired, and the torpedo traveled too deep.

In March 1970, additional tests begun at different places, including Lushun, Zhoushan, and Qinghai, and lasted 18 months, over 500 times and using 104 samples. The 18-month-long trial tested a total of 28 designs and finally solved all of the existing problems. However, the Chinese microelectronics industry was not capable to produce the passive acoustic homing guidance according to the original plan, but due to the urgent need, the original plan changed one last time with unguided version was pressed into service as Yu (鱼) -1 (in September 1971), while the passive acoustic homing guided version was named Yu-1 Jia (鱼-1甲), sometimes also known as Yu-1G, which would take years to complete.

In addition to being able to be launched from modern system, Yu-1 series torpedo can be directly launched from old torpedo tubes including World War II equipment without the need to make any modifications to the launching equipment and fire control systems. The importance of Yu-1 torpedo is that through the development program, China had established the indigenous torpedo manufacturing and developing capability.

== Modification ==
Although the production of the newly built Yu-1 torpedoes has stopped long time ago, production continues in the form of upgrading the existing Yu-1 torpedoes in Chinese inventory, which numbered near 10,000. Yu-1 torpedoes have been modified in various stages, including incorporating ASW capability, so that the torpedo could no longer only be used for ASuW, but instead, can be used for both ASuW and ASW warfare. Another important modification was to incorporate Yu-1 torpedo as part of the CAPTOR mine type mine system. Upgrades with newer electronics had also been done. Incorporating active acoustic homing guidance was another upgrade.

== See also ==
- Export torpedoes of China
