= Type 091 submarine =

Nuclear-powered attack submarine class

- Type 091 SSN profile

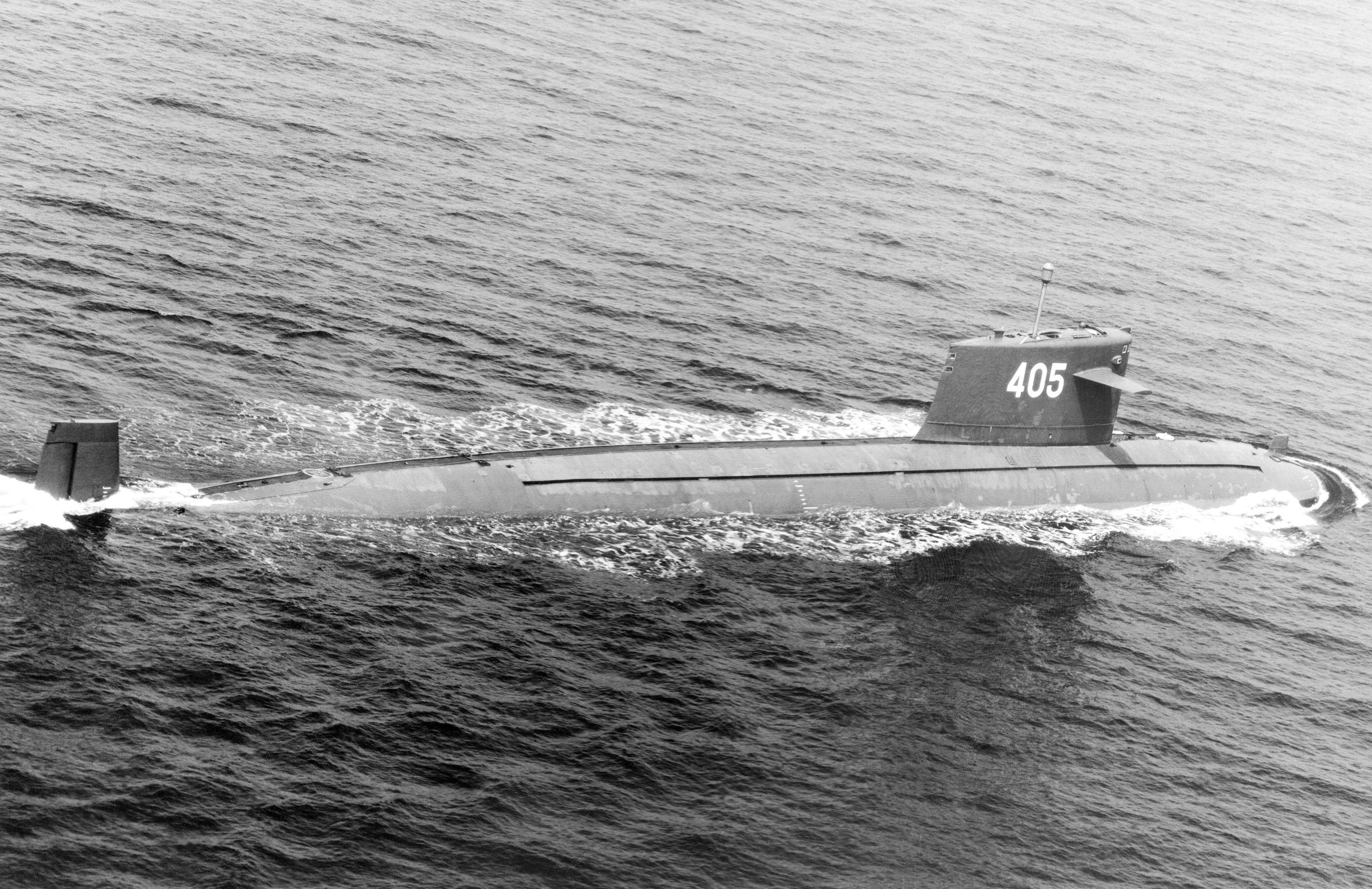
- A Type 091 submarine in 1993

Class overview
- Name: Type 091
- Builders: Bohai Shipyard, Huludao
- Operators: People's Liberation Army Navy
- Succeeded by: Type 093
- In commission: 1974–1990
- Completed: 5
- Active: 3
- Retired: 2

General characteristics
- Type: Nuclear submarine
- Displacement: Hulls 401, 402 5,100 tons (submerged) Hulls 403, 404, 405 5,600 tons (submerged)
- Length: Hulls 401, 402 98 m (321 ft 6 in) Hulls 403, 404, 405 106 m (347 ft 9 in)
- Beam: 10.6 m (34 ft 9 in)
- Propulsion: Hulls 401, 402 1 x 48 megawatt nuclear reactor Hulls 403, 404, 405 1 x 58 megawatt nuclear reactor
- Speed: Hulls 401, 402 24 knots (44 km/h) Hulls 403, 404, 405 25 knots (46 km/h)
- Range: Unlimited
- Endurance: Limited only by food stores
- Sensors & processing systems: Original: SQZ-3 / Type 603 active sonar; SQC-1 / Type 604 passive sonar; Replaced with: SQG-2B passive / French DUUX-5 / TSM2255 (export) sonar; SQZ-262 integrated sonar
- Armament: 6 × 533 mm (21.0 in) torpedo tubes; Yu-3, Yu-6 torpedo; YJ-82 anti-ship cruise missile

The Type 091 (NATO reporting name: Han class) is a first-generation nuclear-powered attack submarine produced by China. It was the People Liberation Army Navy's (PLAN) first nuclear submarine, and the first indigenously produced nuclear attack submarine in Asia.

== History ==
China's nuclear submarine program, "09 Project", was authorized by the Central Military Commission and Mao Zedong in July 1958. In October 1959, Mao ordered the program to proceed after the Soviets refused to assist. Work was slowed by the Great Leap Forward and the nuclear weapons program, which had priority and used similar resources. The submarine program was postponed in March 1963 and resumed in March 1965 after China's first nuclear weapons test. Research on foreign civilian nuclear marine propulsion continued during the pause. A loop-based nuclear reactor was selected over a more powerful but also more complex integrated design in July 1965; it most resembled the reactor used by the Japanese Mutsu. Reactor fuel rod research was disrupted in January 1967 by factional violence at Baotou. In general, the new submarine design represented a leap in size and complexity over the Type 033 diesel–electric submarines then available to the PLAN.

The program was expedited by designing and building the first Type 091 and the prototype reactor simultaneously. The first chief designer was Peng Shilu., and three deputy chief designers were Zhao Renkai, Huang Weilu and Huang Xuhua. The technical design was completed in 1967, and the detailed construction drawings were completed in 1969. Construction of the first boat, hull 401, began in November 1968 and it entered service in August 1974. The second boat, hull 402, was delayed by the Cultural Revolution and commissioned in December 1980. The main propulsion system of the first two boats had poor reliability, with mechanical problems and defective components. There were also reports of inadequate radiation shielding.

Hulls 403, 404 and 405 were completed to a modified design, with longer hulls and more powerful reactors. The last Type 091 launched in 1990.

Hull 404 was the first Type 091 to dive to the designed maximum operating depth of 300 meters in April 1988. The boats were only armed with torpedoes in 1989 due to the protracted development of the Yu-3; the first deep-water Yu-3 test firing occurred in May 1988.

The high cost and limitations of the Type 091 and Type 092 ballistic missile submarine made the development of new nuclear submarines a low priority from the late-1970s to the early-1990s.

The Type 091 has operated mainly in local waters, and has been involved in several incidents. One submarine shadowed the Kitty Hawk carrier battle group in October 1994, provoking a stand-off. Another entered Japanese territorial waters near Ishigaki Island (part of Okinawa Prefecture) near Taiwan in November 2004, causing the Japan Maritime Self-Defense Force to go on alert for the second time since the Second World War; China apologized for the trespass and blamed "technical reasons" on the submarine.

== Design ==
The Type 091 has a teardrop hull. It is as acoustically loud as Soviet nuclear submarines of the late-1950s and 1960s, and mainly suitable for the anti-surface role. By 1970s standards, the boats were slow, noisy, and had poor sensors.

The hydraulic positive ejection system to fire torpedoes at deep depths required fitting torpedo tubes that were too short to launch the Yu-1 and Yu-4 torpedoes. The boats were finally armed with the Yu-3 in 1989. According to Janes, the boats did use the Yu-4.

Hulls 403, 404 and 405 are eight meters longer than hulls 401 and 402. The additional space was used to improve crew habitability, maintainability, and nuclear safety. The reactors were upgraded to produce 20% more power based on work for the Type 092. They were later modernized with anechoic tiles, improved sensors and fire control, seven-bladed screw, YJ-82 anti-ship missiles, and possibly the Yu-6 torpedo.

== Failed lease to Pakistan ==
In 1989, Pakistan made an abortive attempt to procure a Type 091 for US$63 million in 1992, as a response to the Soviet K-43 leased to India in 1988.

== Units ==
Pennant number	Name	Builder	Launched	Commissioned	Decommissioned	Status
401	Changzheng 1	Bohai Shipyard, Huludao	December 1970	1 August 1974	2000	Preserved at the Chinese Navy Museum, Qingdao.
402		Bohai Shipyard, Huludao		30 December 1980	2004	
403		Bohai Shipyard, Huludao		21 September 1984		Active
404		Bohai Shipyard, Huludao		November 1988		Active
405		Bohai Shipyard, Huludao	8 April 1990			Active

== See also ==
- List of submarine classes in service
- Cruise missile submarine
- Attack submarine
