= BNS Nabajatra =

Attack submarine of Bangladesh navy

History

Bangladesh
- Name: BNS Nobojatra
- Builder: Wuchang Shipyard
- Launched: 1989
- Acquired: 14 November 2016
- Commissioned: 12 March 2017
- Home port: Chattogram
- Identification: Pennant number: S 161
- Status: In active service

General characteristics
- Class & type: Type 035G submarine (modernized)
- Displacement: 2,110 tones (submerged)
- Length: 76 m (249 ft)
- Beam: 7.6 m (25 ft)
- Draft: 5.1 m (17 ft)
- Depth: 7.6 m (25 ft)
- Propulsion: Type E390ZC-1 diesel engine, 5,200 hp (3,900 kW)
- Speed: Submerged: 18 knots (33 km/h); Surfaced: 15 knots (28 km/h); Snorting: 10 knots (19 km/h)
- Test depth: 300 m (980 ft)
- Complement: 57 (10 officers)
- Sensors & processing systems: Surface search radar: MRK-50 Topol (Snoop Tray); Active sonar: H/SQ2-262C; Passive sonar: Chinese copy of French DUUX-5; Communication: Magnavox SATNAV system
- Electronic warfare & decoys: Type 921A EW Suite
- Armament: 8 x 533 mm (21 in) torpedo tubes(6 in the bow and 2 in the stern) for: ET-31 anti ship torpedoes; ET-40 anti submarine torpedoes; Naval mines in the lieu of torpedoes; Carries total 14 torpedoes or 32 naval mines

BNS Nobojatra is a Type 035G (Ming class) diesel electric submarine of the Bangladesh Navy. She is one of the first two submarines of the Bangladesh Navy.

== Description ==
Nabajatra uses Chinese H/SQ2-262C active sonar (improved Pike Jaw MG-100 sonar), a Chinese copy of the French DUUX-5 passive sonar, integrated by an ES5F integrated sonar system. The boat uses MRK-50 Topol (Snoop Tray) surface search radar, a Magnavox satellite navigation system for communications, with a Type 921A electronics warfare suite.

Nabajatra has eight 533 mm (21 in) torpedo tubes which can launch a complement of 14 heavy weight ET-31 anti-ship torpedoes and ET-40 anti-submarine torpedoes. ET-31 has a range of 15 kilometers at a speed of 40 knots. ET-31 use active/passive acoustic homing guidance. ET-40 torpedo has two modes which can be launched from Model 7436 triple tube torpedo launching system. ET-40 has a 30-kilometer range at a speed of 25 knots or 18-kilometer range with a speed of 42 knots. ET-40 use wire guidance (fire-and-forget) and active acoustic homing for ASW role. ET-40 can also be used against surface ship while first stage is straight run (unguided) till passive acoustic homing mode (600m acquisition range) or wake homing guidance activated. Alternatively, the boat can carry up to 32 naval mines.

== Service history ==
The ship was launched in 1989, serving the People's Liberation Army Navy Submarine Force from 1990 with pennant number 356. Before joining the Bangladesh Navy, the boat went through upgrade and refitting, extending its life to 2030. The upgrade included the installation of new sensors, modern computers and communication systems. Interior decoration and crew comfort also improved.

The boat was handed over to the Bangladesh Navy on 14 November 2016. She reached Chattogram port, Bangladesh on 22 December 2016. She was commissioned to the Bangladesh Navy on 12 March 2017.

== Gallery ==
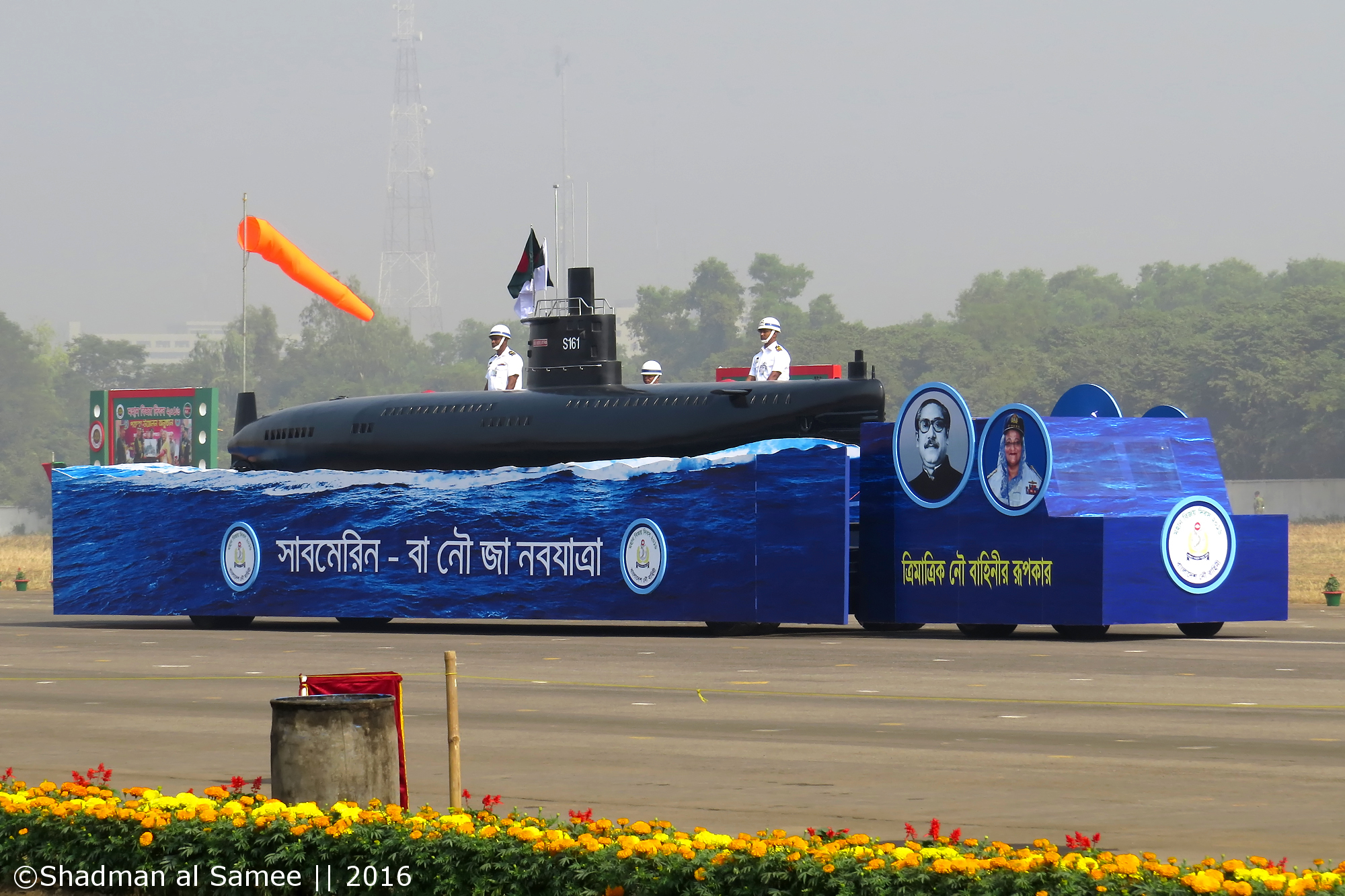
BNS Nabajatra (S161) mockup at Victory Day Parade 2016.

== See also ==
- BNS Joyjatra
