= Chinese submarine Changzheng 1 =

Type 091 nuclear submarine

Coordinates: 36.0557739°N 120.3212514°E

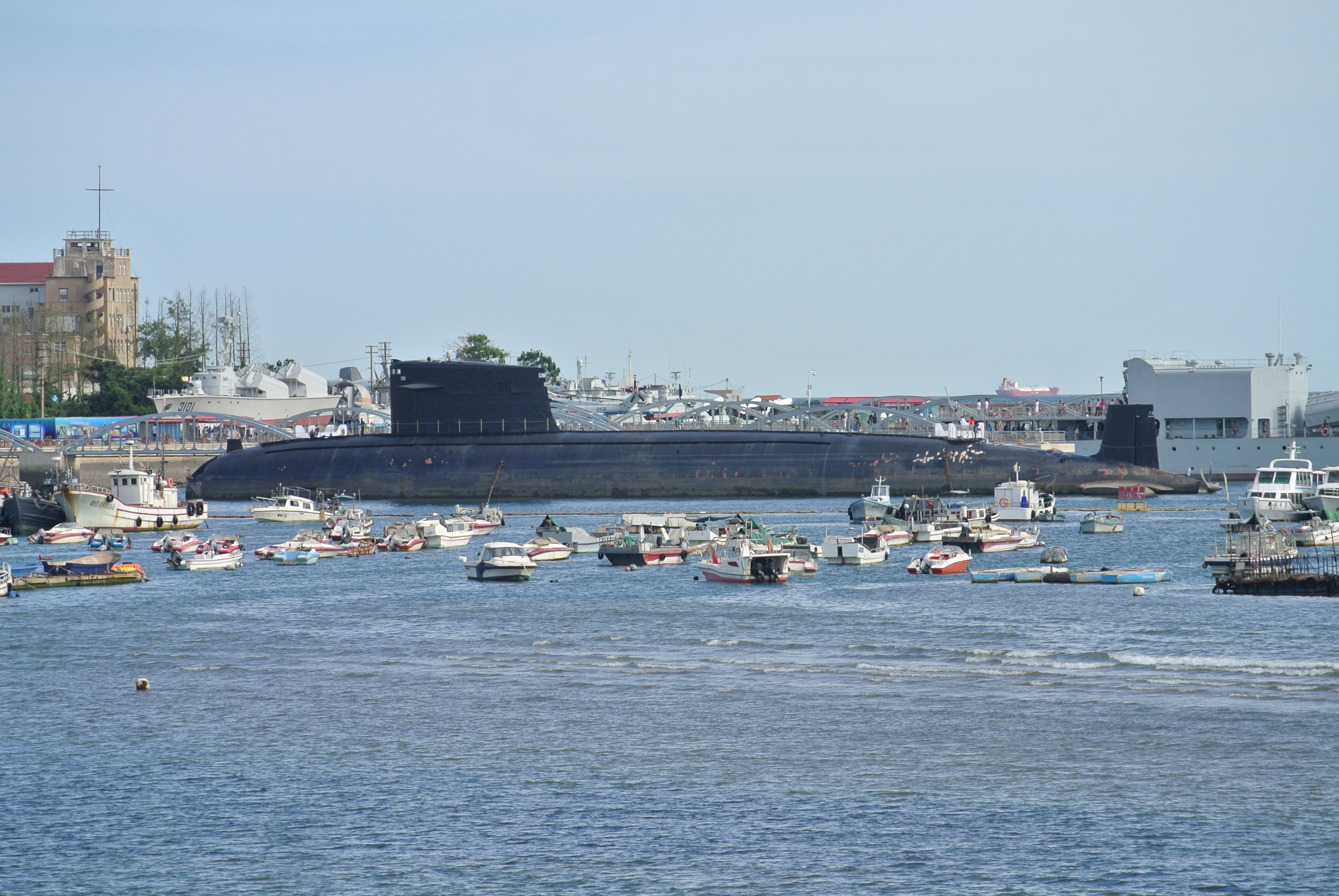
- Changzheng 1 in Qingdao on 27 August 2017

History

China
- Name: Changzheng 1; (长征1号)
- Builder: Bohai Shipyard, Huludao
- Launched: 26 December 1970
- Commissioned: 1 August 1974
- Decommissioned: 2000
- Identification: Pennant number: 401
- Status: Museum ship at Qingdao Naval Museum, Qingdao

General characteristics
- Class & type: Type 091 nuclear attack submarine
- Displacement: 5,500 tons (submerged)
- Length: 98 m (321 ft 6 in)
- Beam: 10 m (32 ft 10 in)
- Draft: 7.4 m (24 ft 3 in)
- Propulsion: 1 nuclear turbo-electric engine – pressurized water reactor
- Speed: 25 knots (46 km/h)
- Range: Unlimited
- Complement: 75
- Armament: 6 × 533 mm (21 in) torpedo tube; RPK-2 Vyuga torpedo

Changzheng 1 (401) ("Long March 1") is a decommissioned Type 091 nuclear attack submarine of the People's Liberation Army Navy.

== Development and design ==
The 091 nuclear submarine is the first nuclear submarine developed by the People's Republic of China. It has been completed and put into service since 1970. A total of 5 ships have been built and deployed in the North Sea Fleet of the Chinese People's Liberation Army. There are still three ships of this type currently in service.

China's nuclear submarine program started in June 1958. Because the Soviet Union did not provide support, it was struggling without external help, and was forced to temporarily shelve it from 1963. Thus, starting in 1965, China began to build onshore simulated reactors as a power test for future nuclear submarines. The PLA Navy has developed a plan to develop two nuclear-powered submarines, including a nuclear-powered attack nuclear submarine, and a ballistic missile nuclear submarine modified on this basis. Beginning in 1969, a team of top scientists began to invest in the nuclear submarine development plan. The chief designer was Peng Shilu, and the deputy chief designers were Huang Xuhua, Zhao Renkai, and Huang Weilu. During the same period, China built supporting facilities for nuclear submarines, including a land-based experimental nuclear reactor in Mianyang, Sichuan, a nuclear submarine dock at the Huludao Shipyard in Liaoning, as well as supporting torpedoes, sonars, and missiles.

The Type 091 nuclear submarine has been plagued by various problems since it entered service, including excessive underwater noise and incomplete weapon systems. The first two boats of this type (401 and 402 boats) received upgrades in the late 1980s and were decommissioned in 2000–2001. The 403 and 404 boats are quite different from the earlier 091 class. Acoustic tiles were installed at the beginning, and various equipment was upgraded. The length of the whole boat was also 8 meters longer. At the same time, it was further upgraded in 1998. Installed more efficient anechoic tiles, may be modified with wire-guided Yu-6 torpedoes and improved Yu-3 torpedoes, and have the ability to launch the Eagle-82 anti-ship missiles underwater.

== Construction and career ==
Lofting began in May 1968, overall construction began in November and the overall water test of the first boat was completed in April 1970. At the same time, the land-based model reactor was installed on April 28, 1970, and commissioning officially began on May 1. On July 30, the land-based model reactor reached full power operation, and the indicators fully met the design requirements. She was launched on 26 December 1970 at Bohai Shipyard in Huludao and commissioned on 1 August 1974 into the North Sea Fleet.

Changzheng 1 was decommissioned in 2000. After thorough denuclearization, she now serve as a museum ship in Qingdao Naval Museum, Qingdao.

== Gallery ==
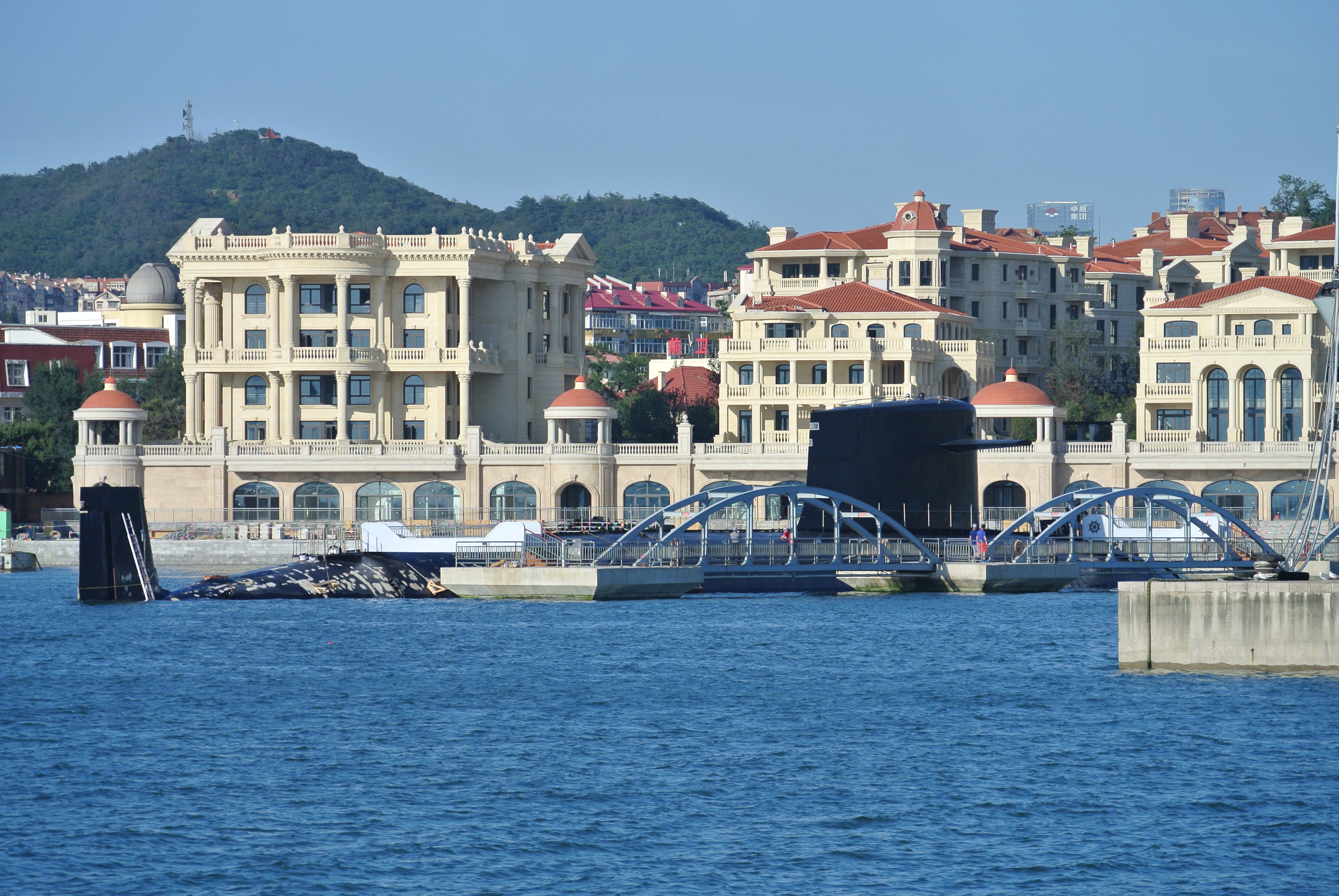
Changzheng 1 in Qingdao Naval Museum on 24 August 2017.

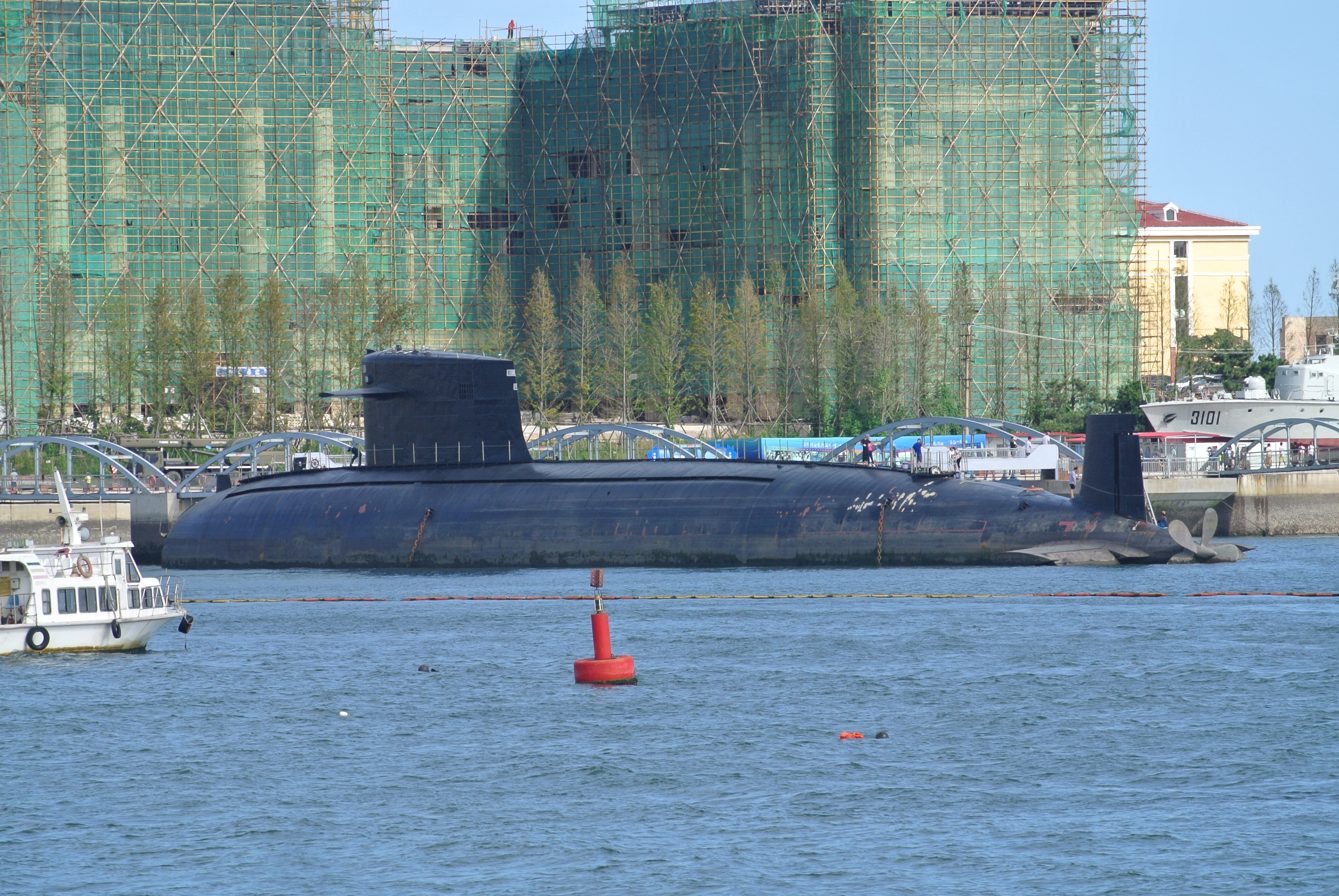
Changzheng 1 in Qingdao Naval Museum on 27 August 2017.
