= Yu-5 torpedo =

Yu-5 (鱼-5) torpedo is the first wire-guided torpedo developed by China. It is an ASW torpedo designed for conventional diesel-electric submarines. It is often erroneously referred as the Chinese copy of Soviet TEST-71 torpedo, which is incorrect as the Soviet torpedo was developed in 1971 and its successor TEST-71MKE was developed in 1977, at the worst time of Sino-Soviet split. With Yu-5 entering Chinese service in 1989, it was simply impossible to acquire any technologies of Soviet TEST-71 torpedo, which was not purchased by China until 1993, four years after the Yu-5 torpedo had already entered service. The Yu-5 is not a product of indigenous development and is based largely upon previous Soviet and American designs, with much of the propulsion system being derived from the American Mark 46 lightweight torpedo.

== Development ==
China had begun to explore the wire guidance technology for torpedoes in the early 1960s but due to the political turmoil in China, the research stopped like many other Chinese research programs. With the progress of Yu-3 torpedo developmental program, Chinese military realized that an ASW torpedo was needed for its conventional diesel-electric submarine fleet in addition to the ASuW torpedo under development (Yu-4 torpedo). As a result, Yu-5 torpedo was developed, and it was decided to utilize the wire guidance technology.

The development of Yu-5 torpedo begun around the same time of Yu-4 torpedo in the early 1970s, but due to the backward of the Chinese technological and industrial base, the initial tests of wire guidance was carried out by using steel wire instead of copper wire, just like when it was done more than a decade ago in the late 1950s. The propulsion development of Yu-5 torpedo benefited greatly from the US Mark 46 torpedo recovered by the Chinese fishermen for the Otto fuel II research and then some technological supports for license production of Mk 46 Mod. 2 torpedo in China of the 1985 deal signed between two countries. Other unconfirmed reports have claimed that during the development of Yu-5 torpedo, advanced American and Japanese commercial off-the-shelf technologies at the time were used, and incorporating these advanced commercial technologies was part of the reason of the prolonged development, which lasted almost two decades. In fact, Yu-5 torpedo program started around the same time with Yu-4 torpedo program but the latter was completed earlier. Another reason for the prolonged development was the Yu-5 was used as a test vehicle for newer technologies for later torpedoes such as the Yu-6 torpedo, for example, optical fiber wire guidance had been tested on Yu-5 torpedo since 1986 (However, although the tests were considered somewhat satisfactory, it was not adopted for Yu-5 torpedo, which used the traditional copper wire). The Yu-5 torpedo was finally accepted into the service in 1989 and the series production begun the next year in 1990. The torpedo is initially guided by wire guidance for most of the time, and at the final stage, the guidance is changed to active / passive acoustic homing guidance, and the active / passive acoustic homing guidance would also automatically activates when the wire is accidentally severed before the final stage. Yu-5 is the first domestic Chinese ASW torpedo for conventionally powered submarines.

== Specification ==
- Diameter: 533 mm
- Length: 7.8 m
- Warhead: 400 kg
- Guidance: active / passive acoustic homing + wire guidance
- Propulsion: Otto fuel II
- Range: Up to 30 km @ 50 knots (93 km/h)
- Speed: Up to 50-knot (93 km/h)
- Depth: > 400 m

== Modifications ==
At least two modifications of Yu-5 torpedo have been completed since it was accepted into the Chinese service, with one completed in the summer of 1995, and another in 1998. However, due to the very limited information released, it is not known what modification was completed in which year. The modifications included incorporation of ASuW capability, updated electronics, and capability of being able to be used as part of CAPTOR mine type mine system.

== ET34 ==
ET34 torpedo is one of the three derivatives of Yu-5 torpedo, with the other being ET36. Both ET34 and ET36 are electrically powered with silver zinc batteries, as opposed to the original Otto fuel, and both are shorter than Yu-torpedo, with shorter range. ET34 torpedo has a counter-rotating permanent magnet DC motor, and it is reported to be the first Chinese homing torpedo with selectable speed/range. Specification:

- Diameter: 533 mm
- Length: 6.6 m
- Guidance: active / passive acoustic homing + wire guidance
- Propulsion: electrical (silver zinc battery)
- Range: 18 km @ 42 knots (78 km/h), 20 km @ 40 knots (74 km/h) and 25 km @ mixed speed
- Speed: 40 or 42-knot (78 km/h)
- Depth: > 300 m

== ET36 ==
ET36 torpedo is one of the three derivatives of Yu-5 torpedo, with the other being ET34. Both ET34 and ET36 are electrically powered with silver zinc batteries, as opposed to the original Otto fuel, and both are shorter than Yu-torpedo, with shorter range. Most components are shared commonly by ET34 and ET36, with the latter has a bigger warhead at the cost of reduced range, and like ET34, ET36 has selectable speed/range. Specification:

- Diameter: 533 mm
- Length: 6.6 m
- Guidance: active / passive acoustic homing + wire guidance
- Propulsion: electrical (silver zinc battery)
- Range: 25 km @ 25 knots (46 km/h), 10 km @ 36 knots (67 km/h), 18 to 20 km @ mixed speed
- Speed: 18 to 36-knot (67 km/h)
- Depth: > 300 m

== C43 ==
C43 torpedo is the upgrade of Yu-5, and also the last publicly known derivative of Yu-5 series torpedo. In January 1990, China announced the first tests of a new heavy dual purpose heavy torpedo designated as C43, which can be used against both the surface and subsurface targets. Like its cousins ET 34/36C43 also appears be with export in mind when designed, but there is not any confirmed export sales. The dual-purpose design upgrade of C43 for Yu-5 was adopted in the design of Yu-6 torpedo, which is the first indigenously developed Chinese torpedo that is designed for both surface and subsurface target from the start.

== See also ==
- Export torpedoes of China
