= Jianggezhuang Naval Base =

Chinese naval base on the Yellow Sea

Coordinates: 36°6′38.78″N 120°34′32.88″E

The Jianggezhuang Naval Base (Chinese: 姜各庄), also known as Submarine Base No.1 (Chinese: 潜艇第一基地), is a Chinese naval base approximately 15 miles (24 km) east of Qingdao on the Yellow Sea. The base spans a bay 1.2 miles (1.9 km) across, with the main facilities located in the eastern portion of the bay. Open source satellite imagery shows the base to be an enclosed harbour with breakwaters and a single entrance; there are six piers, a dry dock, various service facilities and an underground submarine tunnel.

The base hosts China's Type 092-class ballistic missile submarine and Type 091-class nuclear attack submarines.

== See also ==
- Yulin Naval Base
