= Type 030 submarine =

Class overview
- Builders: Jiangnan Shipyard
- Operators: People's Liberation Army Navy

General characteristics
- Type: midget submarine
- Displacement: 350 tonnes (340 long tons; 390 short tons)
- Installed power: Batteries & diesel
- Propulsion: Electric motor & diesel engine
- Speed: 12 knots (22 km/h; 14 mph)
- Armament: 4 torpedoes

Type 030 submarine was a mini submarine developed by the People's Liberation Army Navy (PLAN) in the mid 1960s, and only a single unit was built. However, before the first unit could be completed, the program was cancelled in the early 1970s, and the unfinished hull was scrapped.

After Sino-Soviet split, China realized its navy, PLAN, was no match for the Soviet navy, and in the event of Soviet invasion, PLAN has to withdraw to coastal waters and even inland waterways to fight a guerrilla warfare against the much stronger opponent, as smaller submarines such as mini or midget subs are much more suited for fighting the underwater guerrilla war. In addition, smaller subs were also able to be mass-produced. In 1964, the deputy commander-in-chief of PLAN, Vice admiral Zhao Qi-Min (赵启民) formally issued the order to develop a mini/midget submarine, and the 701st Research Institute of China Shipbuilding Industry Corporation (CSIC) was tasked to issue the requirement, which was eventually named as Type 030 in 1965 when the winning design was selected from several proposals.

Because the mini/midget sub was intended to operate in riverine and coastal region, the speed requirement was only 12 kt max, and hence propulsion requirement of the boat only rated at 320 kW. The general designer of Type 030 was Mr. Li Jian-Qiu (李建球), the general designer of Type 033G/G1. However, due to the unrealistic requirement of packing large amount of equipment and weaponry into a very small hull, the internal space was very cramped and production had to be stopped several times for redesign. As a result, production was protracted, with the first boat still not completed in the early 1970s after construction begun in June 1968, and as PLAN changed its doctrine in the early 1970s, midget or mini submarine were no longer a priority, and in 1973, the program was finally cancelled by PLAN, and with the successful development of larger Type 033 and Type 035, the unfinished first unit was broken up and scrapped. The electric motor of Type 030 was kept at the PLAN Naval Engineering University for exhibition.
