= Roketsan Akya =

Akya
- Type: Heavyweight dual-purpose ASW and ASuW torpedo
- Place of origin: Turkey

Service history
- In service: May 2024-Present
- Used by: Turkish Navy

Production history
- Designer: Turkish Navy ArMerKom ("Research Center Command")
- Manufacturer: Roketsan
- Produced: 2021 - present

Specifications
- Mass: 1,200 kg (2,600 lb)
- Length: 7 m (23 ft)
- Diameter: 533 mm (21.0 in)
- Warhead weight: 350–380 kg (770–840 lb)
- Engine: electric motor
- Operational range: 50+ km
- Maximum speed: 45 kn (83 km/h; 52 mph)
- Guidance system: Wire-guided with fiber-optic cable, active/passive sonar homing, wake homing
- Launch platform: Submarine

Akya is a new-generation heavyweight torpedo developed by Roketsan for the Turkish Navy. As of 2021, its tests completed, and it went in serial production. "Akya" is the Turkish name of Leerfish.

== History ==
The heavyweight torpedo project was initiated by the ArMerKom ("Research Center Command") of the Turkish Navy in 2009. Roketsan was signed for the realization. The serial production of Akya started in 2021 after the test firings successfully completed in 2020, which began by July 2013. It is planned that the Reis-class, Preveze-class and Gür-class submarines will be equipped with Akya. It will replace the torpedoes of type Mk 14, Mk 23, Mk 24 (Tigerfish) Mod.2, Mk 37 Mod.2 & Mod.3 and SST-4 Mod.0.

AKYA successfully completed its first live firing trial on 27 December 2023, when it was fired from submarine TCG Preveze and destroyed target ship ex-TCG Gazal. The first delivery to the Turkish Navy was conducted in May 2024.

== Features ==
Powered by a brushless DC electric motor and counter-rotating propellers using high-energy electrochemical batteries, Akya is able to achieve a speed exceeding 45 kn (83 km/h; 52 mph) and a range of more than 50 km (27 nmi). It has a proximity fuze and an underwater shock-insensitive warhead 350–380 kg (770–840 lb) in weight. Externally wire-guided with a fiber-optic cable, the heavyweight torpedo has active/passive sonar head and is capable of acoustic countermeasure, wake homing. The 1,200 kg (2,600 lb) heavy torpedo is 7 m (23 ft) long and has a diameter of 533 mm (21.0 in).

== See also ==
- Black Shark
- DM2A4
- K731 White Shark
- K761 Tiger Shark
- Mk 48
- Spearfish
- Tigerfish
- Type 89
- Type 65
- Varunastra (torpedo)
- Yu-6
