= Yu-11 torpedo =

- Type: Lightweight ASW torpedo
- Place of origin: People's Republic of China

Service history
- In service: 2010s
- Used by: People's Liberation Army Navy

Production history
- Designer: China Shipbuilding Industry Corporation

Specifications
- Length: 3 m (9.8 ft)
- Diameter: 324 mm (12.8 in)
- Warhead: high explosive
- Warhead weight: 45 kg (99 lb) shaped charge
- Engine: pump-jet, Rankine cycle
- Maximum depth: > 600 metres (2,000 ft)?
- Guidance system: active / passive acoustic homing
- Launch platform: Surface ships (incl. rocket); Helicopters

The Yu-11 (Chinese: 鱼-11; pinyin: yú-11; lit. 'fish 11'; from Chinese: 鱼雷; lit. 'fish bomb', meaning ‘torpedo’) is a lightweight torpedo developed by the People's Republic of China.

== Description ==
It entered service in the 2010s as the principal anti-submarine weapon of major People's Liberation Army Navy (PLAN) warships. It was first publicly identified in July 2015. Compared to its predecessor Yu-7 torpedo, the major improvement appears to be the pump-jet propulsion system. The Yu-11 torpedo is quieter and may potentially operate at depths greater than 600 metres. The Yu-11 is longer, at three metres, and heavier than the Yu-7.

The Yu-11 is likely to become the standard PLAN lightweight torpedo and may have started equipping modern PLAN warships since 2012. The overall capability is said to be similar to the US Mark 50 torpedo.

The export version Yu-11E or ET-81 was unveiled in 2022. It can be launched from a C802 platform, or from export variants of 056A and 054A. The payload is based on the ET52C or ET60.
