= Type 095 submarine =

Nuclear-powered attack submarine class

Class overview
- Name: Type 095
- Builders: China Shipbuilding Industry Corporation Bohai Shipyard, Huludao
- Operators: People's Liberation Army Navy Submarine Force
- Preceded by: Type 093
- Building: At least 1

General characteristics
- Type: Attack submarine
- Displacement: ~10,000 tons submerged
- Length: 110 m (360 ft 11 in)
- Beam: 12 to 13 m (39 ft 4 in to 42 ft 8 in)
- Installed power: Nuclear reactor
- Propulsion: 1 × single shaft shrouded pump-jet propulsor
- Range: Unlimited
- Endurance: Only limited by food and maintenance requirements
- Armament: Torpedoes, cruise missiles, anti-ship missiles, anti-submarine missiles, mines

The Type 095 (Chinese designation: 09-V, NATO Reporting Name: Sui class) is a class of latest generation nuclear-powered attack submarines under construction for the People's Liberation Army Navy (PLAN) of China. It is anticipated that the Type 095 submarine will have a substantially reduced acoustic signature, within an improved hull design.

Compared to the Type 093, the Type 095 will have a more advanced nuclear reactor, VLS cells and greater number of advanced sensors such as new active/passive flank array sonar and low- and high-frequency towed sonar array. Additionally, it is also speculated that Type 095 submarines may act as a potential underwater escort for any future Chinese aircraft carrier task forces.

It is reported that Bohai Shipbuilding Heavy Industrial Corporation will be building the submarines in a new plant in the Huludao, Liaoning province. In February 2026 satellite images and synthetic-aperture radar suggested that an under construction Type 095 had been launched at Bohai Shipyard. The submarine is believed to have similar acoustic quieting technology used in Russia's Akula-class submarine.

== See also ==
- People's Liberation Army Navy Submarine Force
- Cruise missile submarine
