= Mark 50 torpedo =

Mark 50 Advanced Lightweight Torpedo
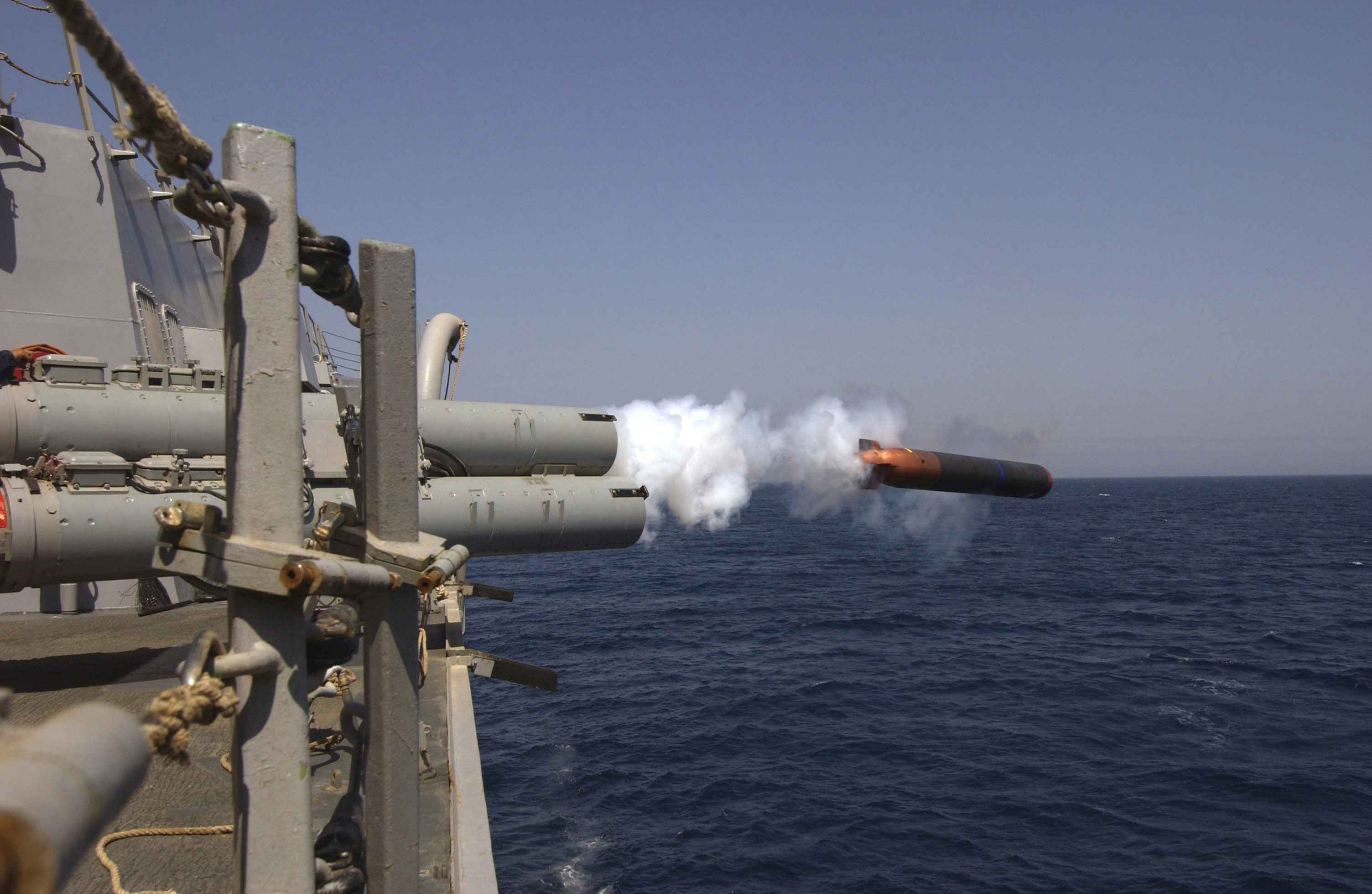
- Mark 50 torpedo being fired
- Type: Lightweight ASW torpedo
- Place of origin: United States

Service history
- Used by: United States Navy

Production history
- Designer: Honeywell
- Designed: 1974
- Manufacturer: Alliant Techsystems
- Produced: 1991–
- No. built: 1000

Specifications
- Mass: approx. 800 lb (360 kg)
- Length: 9.5 ft (2.9 m)
- Width: 12.75 in (0.324 m)
- Warhead: HE shaped charge
- Warhead weight: 100 lb (45 kg)
- Engine: Stored chemical energy propulsion system pump-jet
- Propellant: sulfur hexafluoride, lithium
- Operational range: 16,000 yd (15 km)
- Maximum depth: > 1,900 ft (580 m)
- Maximum speed: > 40 kn (74 km/h)
- Guidance system: Active or passive/active acoustic homing
- Launch platform: Mark 32 surface vessel torpedo tubes, ASW aircraft (P-3 Orion), RUM-139 VL-ASROC

The Mark 50 torpedo is a U.S. Navy advanced lightweight torpedo for use against fast, deep-diving submarines. The Mk 50 can be launched from all anti-submarine aircraft and from torpedo tubes aboard surface combatant ships. The Mk 50 was intended to replace the Mk 46 as the fleet's lightweight torpedo. Instead the Mark 46 will be replaced with the Mark 54 LHT.

== Propulsion system ==
The torpedo's stored chemical energy propulsion system uses a small tank of sulfur hexafluoride gas, which is sprayed over a block of solid lithium, which generates enormous quantities of heat, which generates steam. The steam propels the torpedo in a closed Rankine cycle, supplying power to a pump-jet. This propulsion system offers the very important deep-water performance advantage that the combustion products—sulfur and lithium fluoride—occupy less volume than the reactants, so the torpedo does not have to force these out against increasing water pressure as it approaches a deep-diving submarine.

== General characteristics, Mk 50 ==
- Primary function: air and ship-launched lightweight torpedo
- Contractor: Alliant Techsystems, Westinghouse
- Length: 9.5 ft (2.9 m)
- Weight: approx. 800 lb (360 kg)
- Diameter: 12.75 in (324 mm)
- Speed: > 40 kn (74 km/h)
- Power plant: Stored Chemical Energy Propulsion System
- Propulsion: Pump Jet
- Guidance system: Active/passive acoustic homing
- Warhead: 100 lb (45 kg) high explosive

== Comparable weapons ==
- Stingray torpedo
- MU90 Impact
- Yu-11 torpedo

== Notes ==
=== Bibliography ===
- MK-50 Advanced Lightweight Torpedo via FAS
- USA Torpedoes since World War II - navweaps.com
- Issues Related to the Navy's Mark-50 Torpedo Propulsion System, General Accounting Office, January 1989 - has diagrams showing internal general arrangement, retrieved December 18, 2012
- Friedman, Norman (1991). The Naval Institute Guide to World Naval Weapons Systems 1991/1992. Annapolis, Maryland: Naval Institute Press. ISBN 0-87021-288-5.
- Zimmerman, Stan (2000). Submarine Technology for the 21st Century (2nd ed.). Victoria, British Columbia: Trafford Publishing. ISBN 1-55212-330-8.
