= USS Sioux (AT-75) =

Tugboat of the United States Navy

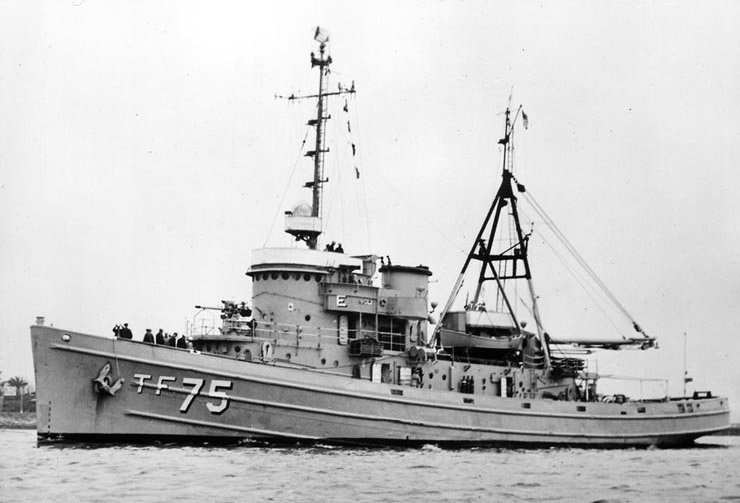

History

United States
- Name: USS Sioux
- Builder: United Engineering Co., San Francisco, California
- Laid down: 14 February 1942
- Launched: 27 May 1942
- Commissioned: 6 December 1942
- Decommissioned: 23 April 1947
- Recommissioned: 15 October 1952
- Decommissioned: 15 August 1973
- Stricken: 15 August 1973
- Honors and awards: 4 battle stars (World War II); 8 battle stars (Vietnam)
- Fate: Transferred to Turkey, 15 August 1973

Turkey
- Name: TCG Gazal (A-587)
- Acquired: 15 August 1973
- Decommissioned: December 2017
- Identification: Code letters TBEW (1973– )
- Fate: Sunk as a Target Ship on 27.12.2023

General characteristics
- Class & type: Navajo-class fleet tug
- Displacement: 1,500 long tons (1,524 t)
- Length: 205 ft (62 m)
- Beam: 38 ft 6 in (11.73 m)
- Draft: 15 ft 3 in (4.65 m)
- Speed: 16 knots (30 km/h; 18 mph)
- Complement: 80
- Armament: 1 × 3 in (76 mm) gun

USS Sioux (AT-75) was a Navajo-class fleet tug of the United States Navy that saw service during World War II, and in the Korean and Vietnam Wars.

== Construction and commissioning ==
The ship was laid down on 14 February 1942 by United Engineering Co. of San Francisco, California, at Mare Island Navy Yard. Sioux was launched on 27 May 1942 sponsored by Mrs. Evelyn H. Sims of Jefferson, Texas, the mother of five sons serving in the Navy. USS Sioux commissioned on 6 December 1942.

== World War II Pacific Theater operations ==
After a brief shakedown period off the Pacific coast of the United States, Sioux departed from the west coast on 3 February 1943; towed YO-8 to Pearl Harbor; and continued on to the South Pacific. Sioux was in the war zone by 30 June 1943 and participated in rear-echelon activities in support of the New Georgia operation.

During the periods 1 November to 15 December 1943 and 25 December 1943 to 4 February 1944, she accompanied six reinforcement echelons to Cape Torokina on Bougainville in the Solomons. In January and February 1944, Sioux was active in support of the Kavieng and Rabaul raids. She was an element of the support unit for the ships engaged in the Battle for Leyte Gulf in late October 1944 and for the 3rd Fleet during the major portion of the following month.

== Supporting Iwo Jima operations ==
She supported the Fast Carrier Task Force (Task Force 58) during its air strikes on Japan in mid-February 1945 and during the Iwo Jima assault later in the month. From March into June, Sioux was assigned to the Okinawa invasion support group; and, in July, she again supported carrier strikes on the Japanese homeland. On the afternoon of 14 May 1945, while on station in the waters between Okinawa and the Western Carolines, Sioux took her place beside her big sisters in the battle fleet when her gunners spotted a Kaiten, a Japanese two-man, suicide submarine, and sank it with 40 millimeter gunfire.

== End of War operations ==
Following the war's end, she did towing duty in the Surigao Strait and between Leyte and Okinawa. From January until September 1946, the tug was in the Marshall Islands supporting "Operation Crossroads", the atomic bomb tests conducted at Bikini Atoll. On 2 December 1946, Sioux began inactivation procedure at Terminal Island Naval Shipyard, Long Beach, California. She reported to the Commander, San Diego Group, Pacific Reserve Fleet on 22 April 1947 and was decommissioned the next day. She entered the Pacific Reserve Fleet and was berthed at San Diego.

== Recommissioning for Korean War ==
Sioux recommissioned at San Diego on 15 October 1952. She was assigned to Service Squadron 1 at San Diego Naval Station. From recommissioning until 1965, her deployments were fairly evenly divided between the northern Pacific and western Pacific, with non-deployment periods taken up by routine operations along the Pacific coast of the United States.

== Nuclear Testing operations ==
In 1954, Sioux participated in her second series of nuclear tests in the Pacific and returned again for the third series in 1956. Her deployment in 1958 was to the Aleutian Islands in the northern Pacific. In 1959, she deployed both to the Far East and to the northern Pacific, operating out of Adak, Alaska. In December 1962, she returned to the western Pacific, remaining until May 1963. Two months after her return to San Diego, she underwent a three-month overhaul; then resumed towing duties along the west coast. On the second day of 1964, she deployed to Adak again and remained until March, returning to San Diego, via Seattle, on the 25th. She resumed west coast operations and continued in that employment throughout the remainder of 1964 and for the first four months of 1965.

== Vietnam War activity ==
The tug's schedule of deployments changed after 1965 as a result of the escalation of the Vietnam War. Her overseas movements, from that time forward, were restricted to the western Pacific. On 10 May 1965, she departed San Diego for the Far East. While there, she visited Da Nang, South Vietnam, in July after towing YOG-196 there from Subic Bay; then, on 7 July, departed for a two-week tour of duty performing surveillance in the South China Sea. Sioux returned to operations out of Subic Bay until 10 September when she commenced another 18 days of surveillance in the South China Sea.

For the next seven years, Sioux alternated between deployments to WestPac and routine operations out of San Diego. Between 1965 and 1972, 1969 was the only year during which she saw no service in the western Pacific. During each of her Far East tours, she entered the war zone around Vietnam, visiting Da Nang several times, Cam Ranh Bay at least once and other, less well known places such as Qui Nhơn and Vũng Tàu.

== Decommissioning and sale to the Turkish Navy ==
On 4 March 1972, upon her return to San Diego from her last WestPac cruise, Sioux commenced west coast operations again. This employment lasted until October when preparations were made for the transfer of Sioux to the Turkish Navy on lease.

The transfer took place on 30 October 1972, and Sioux was renamed Gazal (A-587). In August 1973, Sioux was transferred back to the United States, then retransferred, by sale, to Turkey. All of this, including the striking of her name from the Navy List, occurred on 15 August 1973.

One of the oldest ships in service, TCG Gazal was decommissioned from Turkish Navy in December 2017 and destroyed as a target ship during trials of new Turkish Indigenous Torpedo AKYA on 27.12.2023

== Awards ==
USS Sioux (ATF-75) earned four battle stars on the Asiatic-Pacific Campaign Medal for World War II service, and eight battle stars for service in the Vietnam War.

== Bibliography ==
- "Sioux III (AT-75)". history.navy.mil.
- Combined Communication Electronics Board (CCEB) (September 2004). "Unclassified ACP 113 (AF) Call Sign Book For Ships - September 2004" (PDF). NATO Radio Scanner.
- Hürriyet. "Türk donanmasının 72 yaşındaki çınarı". Hürriyet.
- Naval History And Heritage Command. "Sioux". Dictionary of American Naval Fighting Ships. Naval History And Heritage Command. Archived from the original on March 14, 2004.
- "Nave Launchings on San Francisco Bay". Pacific Marine Review. 'Official Organ: Pacific American Steamship Association/Shipowners' Association of the Pacific Coast. June 10, 1942.
