= Huang Xuhua =

Chinese engineer (1926–2025)

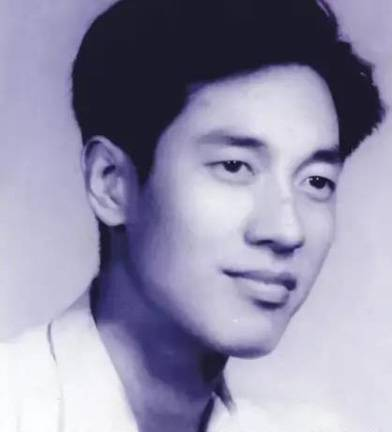
- Huang pictured in 1952
- Born: 12 March 1926; Swabue, Guangdong, China
- Died: 6 February 2025 (aged 98); Wuhan, Hubei, China
- Education: Shanghai Jiao Tong University
- Known for: Designing China's first generation of nuclear submarines
- Scientific career
- Fields: Submarine design Mechanical engineering
- Workplaces: 719 Research Institute (Nuclear Submarine Institute)

Chinese name
- Simplified Chinese: 黄旭华
- Traditional Chinese: 黃旭華
Transcriptions
Standard Mandarin
- Hanyu Pinyin: Huáng Xùhuá
- IPA: [xwǎŋ ɕû.xwǎ]
Hakka
- Pha̍k-fa-sṳ: Vòng Hiuk-fà
Yue: Cantonese
- Yale Romanization: Wong^{4} Juk^{1} Waa^{4}
Southern Min
- Hokkien POJ: N̂g Hiok-hôa
- Teochew Peng'im: Ng^{5} Hiog^{4}-hua^{5}

Huang Xuhua (Chinese: 黄旭华; 12 March 1926 – 6 February 2025) was a Chinese mechanical engineer, and the second chief designer for the country's first generation of nuclear submarines (Type 091 and Type 092). He was director emeritus of the Wuhan-based 719 Research Institute (Nuclear Submarine Institute) of the China Shipbuilding Industry Corporation, and was an academician of the Chinese Academy of Engineering. His name was classified until 1987.

Huang was bestowed the Medal of the Republic, the highest honorary medal of the People's Republic of China, in September 2019.

== Early life and career ==
Huang was born on 12 March 1926 in Swabue, Guangdong Province, of Jieyang Hakka ancestry. He graduated from Shanghai Jiao Tong University in 1949.

After the Sino-Soviet split, Marshal Nie Rongzhen proposed that China develop its own nuclear submarines to break the duopoly of the United States and the Soviet Union, and Mao Zedong accepted the suggestion. In 1958, Huang was among the 29 people selected to develop the program, meant to bolster China's nuclear deterrence against the US and the USSR. They were based in Huludao, a port on the Bohai Sea in Liaoning Province.

At the time China was in the midst of the great famine caused by the Great Leap Forward, and technical knowledge was severely limited. Huang and his colleagues had very primitive resources, using abacuses to do calculations and gathering information from foreign newspapers. When a Chinese diplomat brought from the US toy models of the George Washington-class submarine, Huang was elated to find out that the design his team had made on paper was almost identical to the models.

When the turmoil of the Cultural Revolution swept through China, Huang and other engineers came under persecution. In the late 1960s, Huang, together with scientist Qian Lingxi, was attacked for his "reactionary" background and sent to perform hard labour in the countryside, where he spent two years raising pigs. In retrospect, Huang remembered these years as "the only easy time" of his life, as he had no responsibilities other than feeding the pigs.

In 1970, the Long March I, China's first nuclear submarine, began maritime tests. She entered service in 1974, making China the fifth country to own a nuclear submarine, after the United States, the USSR, the United Kingdom, and France. The boat was decommissioned more than four decades later, and is now displayed in the Chinese Navy Museum in Qingdao. In 1979, Huang was appointed one of the three deputies to the first chief designer Peng Shilu, for China's nuclear submarine project, and the other two were Zhao Renkai and Huang Weilu. The first nuclear-powered ballistic missile submarine (SSBN) of class 092 was completed and commissioned in 1981. In 1983, Huang Xuhua succeeded Peng as the 2nd chief designer and continued working on the nuclear submarine project.

== Personal life and death ==
Huang was married and has three daughters. His immediate family moved with him to Huludao for his secret mission, but he had to reduce contact with the rest of his family. He only rarely visited his parents in Guangdong, who had no idea what he was doing until his role was made public in a 1987 magazine article.

Huang died in Wuhan, Hubei Province on 6 February 2025, at the age of 98.

== Honours and publicity ==
In November 2017, Huang was awarded the honour of "National Model for Virtue". In a nationally televised ceremony in Beijing, to show his respect for two senior citizens who dedicated their lives to contribute to the nation, Paramount leader Xi Jinping personally invited Huang to sit next to him for a group photo. The event was widely reported in Chinese media.

In September 2019, Huang was awarded the Medal of the Republic, China's highest order of honour. In January 2020, he was conferred the Highest Science and Technology Award, together with meteorologist Zeng Qingcun.

Huang was ever called in Chinese media "the father of China's nuclear submarines", but this has been disputed by the naval writer Li Zhongxiao and some scientific-technical staff of the first generation of China's nuclear submarines. According to them, the nuclear submarine was developed by many scientists and did not have a single "father"; and if a single person were to be considered the "father", it should be Peng Shilu, the first chief designer, not Huang, who succeeded Peng as the second chief designer.

In December 2020, China's top official media China Central Television (CCTV) published an article to memorialize China's first nuclear submarine on the 50th anniversary of its launch and reviewed the contributions of Peng Shilu and Huang Xuhua, while only Peng Shilu was hailed as "the father of China's nuclear submarines". In 2021, Huang became a laureate of the Asian Scientist 100 by the Asian Scientist.
