= Peng Shilu =

Chinese engineer (1925–2021)

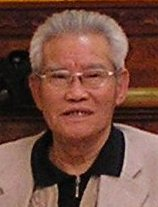
- Born: 18 November 1925; Haifeng County, Guangdong, China
- Died: 22 March 2021 (aged 95)
- Education: Moscow Power Engineering Institute, Beijing Institute of Technology
- Known for: Designing China's first generation of nuclear submarines; Developing China's first nuclear power plants
- Scientific career
- Fields: Nuclear submarine design; Nuclear power plant design
- Workplaces: China National Nuclear Corporation

Chinese name
- Simplified Chinese: 彭士禄
- Traditional Chinese: 彭士祿
Transcriptions
Standard Mandarin
- Hanyu Pinyin: Péng Shìlù
- Wade–Giles: P'eng Shih-lu
- IPA: [pʰə̌ŋ ʂîlû]
Yue: Cantonese
- Yale Romanization: Pàahng Sih-luhk
- Jyutping: Paang^{4} si^{6} Luk^{6}
Southern Min
- Hokkien POJ: Phêng Sū-lo̍k

Peng Shilu (Chinese: 彭士禄; 18 November 1925 – 22 March 2021) was a Chinese nuclear engineer. Hailed as "the father of China's nuclear submarines" and the "father of China's naval nuclear propulsion", he was the first chief designer of the country's nuclear submarine project, directing his team to build China's first generation of nuclear submarines (Type 091 and Type 092). He was also the main designer for China's first nuclear power plants, and was an academician of the Chinese Academy of Engineering. He served as deputy minister for China's Ministry of Shipbuilding Industry, and Ministry of Water Resources and Electric Power.

== Biography ==
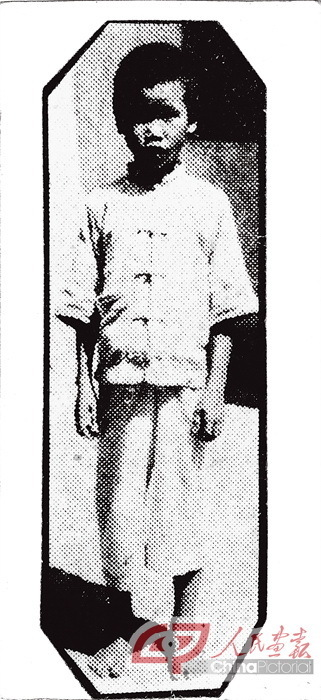
In 1933, Peng Shilu was jailed at the age of 8 for being the son of Peng Pai. The photo was taken by the Kuomintang authorities when he was arrested.

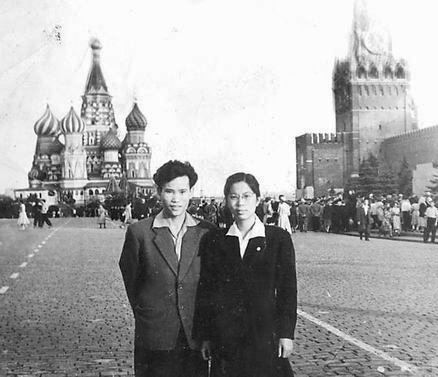
Peng Shilu, the father of China's nuclear submarines, and his wife Ma Shuying were in Moscow, the Soviet Union, in 1950s.

Peng Shilu was born on 18 November 1925 in Haifeng County, Guangdong province, the son of Peng Pai, a top Chinese Communist revolutionary in the 1920s. His parents were killed by the Kuomintang government when he was less than 4 years old, and he was jailed at the age of 8 for being the son of Peng Pai. He was later rescued by his grandmother and sent to Yan'an by Zhou Enlai. In the 1940s he received his early training in Yan'an Institute of Natural Sciences (now Beijing Institute of Technology).

After 1949, he went to the Soviet Union to complete advanced studies in nuclear science at Moscow Power Engineering Institute. When he returned to China, he was appointed to a senior post conducting research on the submarine nuclear reactor. In 1959, the Soviet Union refused to provide assistance for China's planned project of building nuclear-powered submarines, and Mao Zedong proclaimed that China would build its own nuclear submarines "even if it takes 10,000 years". Peng oversaw the entire nuclear submarine project and set about developing a workable nuclear power plant.

In 1968, Peng proposed and led the building of a land-based prototype nuclear power reactor in Sichuan province for China's first nuclear submarine. This reactor was completed in April 1970 and successfully passed a test in July after Peng reported to the Central Special Commission led by Premier Zhou Enlai. In 1973, Peng was appointed vice president of China Ship Research and Design Institute (Wuhan-based 719 Research Institute, the Nuclear Submarine Institute), and afterwards became deputy minister of the Ministry of Shipbuilding Industry.

China's first nuclear submarine (SSN, class 091) was launched for testing on 26 December 1970, and was commissioned in 1974 with name Long March I, making China the fifth country to own a nuclear submarine after the United States, the Soviet Union, the United Kingdom, and France. The first nuclear-powered ballistic missile submarine (SSBN) of class 092 was completed and commissioned in 1981. Both type 091 and 092 submarines were equipped with the nuclear reactors and propulsion systems created by Peng and his team. In 1979, Peng was appointed the first chief designer of China's nuclear submarine project, while Huang Weilu (黄纬禄), Zhao Renkai (赵仁恺), and Huang Xuhua were appointed deputies.

In 1983, Peng shifted from military to civilian application of nuclear power plants when he was appointed deputy minister for the Ministry of Water Resources and Electric Power, and was also appointed general engineer in the Ministry of Nuclear Industry. He led his team to build the Daya Bay and Qinshan Nuclear Power Plants.

In a talk in his later years, Peng Shilu said as a summary that he only did two things in his life: one was to have built China's nuclear submarines, and the other was to have built China's nuclear power plants.

He died on 22 March 2021, at the age of 95.

== Awards and honors ==
Peng received the National Science Conference Award in 1978, the top prize of the National Science and Technology Progress Awards in 1985, the Science and Technology Progress Award from Ho Leung Ho Lee Foundation in 1996, and the Top Scientific Achievement Award from Ho Leung Ho Lee Foundation in 2017. Once he received the prize money of the Top Scientific Achievement Award from Ho Leung Ho Lee Foundation, he donated all of it as a fund to award young people making significant innovative achievements in the field of nuclear power.

In 1988 he received the honorary title of "Outstanding Contribution to National Defense Science and Technology" from the Commission for Science, Technology and Industry for National Defense.

In 2020, he won the 13th Guanghua Engineering Scientific and Technological Achievement Award for "his outstanding contributions to China's nuclear submarine to achieve a historic breakthrough from nothing, and the determination of technical route of the first nuclear power plant." Guanghua Engineering Science and Technology Award is the highest award in China's engineering field, and initiated and managed by the Chinese Academy of Engineering.

In March 2021, soon after his death, he was hailed as "the father of China's nuclear submarines" by media including the top China's official media.

On 26 May 2021, he was posthumously honored the title "Role Model of the Era" by the top Publicity Department of China, for his contributions to the design of the country's first-generation nuclear submarine in the 1950s, his leading the charge in the establishment of two major nuclear power plants in China, and his great attributes of hard work, sacrifice, and the pursuit of innovation.

On 3 March 2022, he was honored as a "Touching China's Figure of the Year 2021" and hailed as "the father of China's nuclear submarines" by the top China's official media China Central Television.

== Personal life ==
Peng's wife, Ma Shuying (马淑英), was his schoolmate in the Soviet Union, and they married in 1958 when they returned to China. They had a son and a daughter.
