= Yu-6 torpedo =

Yu-6
- Type: Heavyweight dual-purpose ASW and ASuW torpedo
- Place of origin: China

Service history
- In service: 2005
- Used by: China

Specifications
- Diameter: 533 millimetres (21.0 in)
- Warhead: High explosive
- Detonation mechanism: Proximity or contact detonation
- Propellant: Otto fuel II
- Operational range: 45 kilometres (28 mi)
- Maximum speed: 65 kt (maximum for attack)
- Guidance system: Passive / active acoustic homing + wake homing + wire guidance
- Launch platform: Submarine

Yu-6 (鱼-6) torpedo is the Chinese counterpart of the US Mark 48 torpedo, and it is the first domestic Chinese torpedo designed to counter both surface ships and submarines from the very start. Guidance can be by wire, active and passive homing, or wake homing. Domestic Chinese sources have claimed that the Yu-6 torpedo is in the same class as the Mk 48 Mod. 4 torpedo, and it is believed to have been cloned from a captured sample, but official information on the Yu-6 torpedo is limited.

== Developmental history ==
=== Mk 48 capture and early development ===
At least one Mark 48 torpedo was reportedly recovered by Chinese fishermen in the late 1970s or early 1980s, and the government of China might have begun reverse engineering in the 1980s. However, due to the inexperience of the Chinese technological base at the time and the concentration on economic development, most of the reverse engineering project was put on hold after research had been completed on Otto fuel II, wire guidance and some other subsystems; some research continued on a much smaller scale. Achievements from this period to the official restart of development include:

- Outer casing material. A new alloy was needed because the torpedo is to have greater operating depth than all previous Chinese torpedoes. Ding Wenjiang (丁文江), professor of material science at SJTU, developed a new ZLJD-1S alloy. He was given an award for it in 1988.
- Acoustic seeker casing, which required a new material. When most of the reverse engineering was put on hold, research in this field continued. Tianjin Rubber Research Institute (also known as Tianjin Municipal Rubber Industry Research Institute, 天津市橡胶工业研究所) was tasked to develop the rubber needed for the acoustic seeker casing. A team of seven scientists, Shen Yingjun (申英俊), Hou Yehua (侯月华), Zhang Jianguo (张建国), Ma Gangying (马刚英), Zhang Lixia (张立侠), An Jiazhu (安家柱) and Zhang Suqin (章素琴), was formed, and eventually developed new rubber and production techniques needed by October 1994, shortly before the Yu-6 program was fully resumed in 1995. The resulting rubber exceeded the required specification, with density 1.098 ton per cubic meter, speed of sound 1,551 metres per second, and surface roughness 0.16 micrometres.

=== Restart of main development ===
The Yu-6 torpedo development program was revived when the Chinese military realized that despite developing several torpedoes including the Yu-1, Yu-2, Yu-3, Yu-4, and Yu-5, the obsolete doctrine of having separate ASuW and ASW torpedoes was unsuited for modern naval warfare, and the Chinese navy needed a torpedo for both ASuW and ASW. As a result, the Yu-6 program was fully resumed in 1995 and CSIC's 705th Institute (also known as Xi'an Precision Machinery Research Institute (西安精密机械研究所)) was named as the primary contractor, with Dong Chunpeng (董春鹏) as the chief designer.

=== Participants and awards ===
Dong Chunpeng (董春鹏), a University of Science & Technology of China graduate in 1966 who worked for 705th Institute since then, was the chief designer in the 1995 project. He filed 18 patents including four in fields that China had had no experience in. After ten years of development, the Yu-6 torpedo was accepted into service in 2005. In the latter half of February 2007, for his efforts in the development of Yu-6, Dong Chunpeng (董春鹏) was awarded the 2006 State Science and Technology Prizes in Beijing.

He Yuyao (贺昱曜) was in charge of developing the power module for the newly developed computer of the Yu-6 torpedo, which took three years, from 1999 to 2001.

The propulsion system was the biggest obstacle in the development of the Yu-6 torpedo. A team of three scientists, Ms. Su Li (苏丽), Mao Yuanfu (毛元福), and Wang Lisong (王立松) of Harbin Electro Carbon Research Institute (哈尔滨电碳研究所), was tasked to develop the graphite material used to make engine valves and other components. By September 1998 the new graphite material, designated M130, had been successfully developed and then utilized for Yu-6 torpedo. The piston ring of the engine was developed successfully in December 2003 by Yizheng Shuanghuan Piston Ring (仪征双环活塞环有限公司). Wang Guozhi (王国治) was in charge of noise reduction, and his successful research in this field won him second place in the Chinese national scientific and technology advancement award in 1998.

Over two-thirds of the technologies used for the Yu-6 torpedo were new to Chinese arms manufacturers, and there were some serious doubts that they could complete the project on its own.

== Description ==
One characteristic of the Yu-6 torpedo is its high-performance processor; most western torpedoes are believed to use old, but known reliable, processors. The microprocessor used for the Yu-6 is of approximately Intel 80486 class. Some Chinese sources have claimed that Loongson-1 is used for Yu-6 torpedo.

The transducer array of the torpedo's acoustic seeker is believed to have about the same number of transducers as the Mark 48 torpedo. The Yu-6 torpedo uses modular design and open architecture software programming, so that when new technologies and programs become available they can be readily incorporated. The first generation Chinese-made wire-guided torpedo Yu-5 torpedo, used acoustic guidance only in the final stage of an attack or if the wire was severed; in the new torpedo guidance can be switched between wire and acoustic at any time. If the wire is severed, the targeting information stored in the memory enables the computer on board to calculate the approximate new location of the target, augmenting the acoustic homing to achieve a higher kill probability.

== Specifications ==
- Diameter: 533 mm
- Guidance: passive / active acoustic homing + wake homing + wire guidance
- Propulsion: Otto fuel II
- Speed: maximum > 65 kt (for attack)
- Range: maximum > 45 km (at cruise speed)

== Yu-9 ==
Yu-9 (鱼-9) torpedo was developed as the electrically powered counterpart of the Otto-fuel-II-powered Yu-6, with which it shares many components and technologies, with the exception of the propulsion system.

Domestic Chinese sources have said that the torpedo had become the test vehicle and subsequently armed with a new warhead developed by the Chinese naval research institute. The new warhead utilizes sodium hydride compounds / chemical reaction; on detonation a large amount of sodium powder is released, which reacts with seawater to produce large amounts of very-high-temperature hydrogen within a very short period of time, so that the temperature instantly increases to over 2,000 °C within a radius of a few dozen metres as the hydrogen reacts with oxygen, destroying the target even if not hit. Development of the warhead was completed by 2006, and Yu-9 finally became fully operational in 2012.

== See also ==
- Export torpedoes of China
- Roketsan Akya Turkish torpedo
- Spearfish torpedo
- DM2A4
- Varunastra (torpedo)
- Futlyar
- Mark 48 torpedo
