= Chinese submarine Changcheng 353 =

Type 035 diesel submarine

Coordinates: 39.1581965°N 117.8134799°E

History

China
- Name: Changcheng 353; (长城353号)
- Builder: Wuchang Shipyard, Wuhan
- Launched: October 1969
- Commissioned: April 1974
- Decommissioned: 1997
- Identification: Pennant number: 353
- Status: Museum ship at Tianjin Binhai Theme Park, Tianjin

General characteristics
- Class & type: Type 035 submarine
- Displacement: 2,110 tonnes (submerged)
- Length: 76 m (249 ft)
- Beam: 7.6 m (25 ft)
- Draft: 5.1 m (17 ft)
- Depth: 7.6 m (25 ft)
- Propulsion: Type E390ZC-1 diesel engine, 5,200 hp (3,900 kW)
- Speed: 18 knots (33 km/h) (submerged)
- Test depth: 300 m (980 ft)
- Complement: 57
- Armament: 8 x 533 mm (21 in) torpedo tubes(6 in the bow and 2 in the stern): 14 anti-ship or anti-submarine torpedoes; Up to 28/32 naval mines in the lieu of torpedo tubes; Cruise missiles in the lieu of torpedo tubes (Type 035B variant only)

Changcheng 353 is a Type 035 submarine of the People's Liberation Army Navy.

== Development and design ==
In 1963, under the 1950 Sino-Soviet Treaty of Friendship, Alliance and Mutual Assistance, the Soviet Union passed to China the necessary design details in order to produce Romeo-class submarines. The Chinese variant became known as the Type 033, of which China built a total of 84 between 1962 and 1984. During the 1970s, China's ambition to create an indigenous submarine industry lead to the commissioning of Wuhan Ship Development and Design Institute (701 Institute) to design and build an improved submarine based on the Type 033 hull, named the Type 035 (Ming class). Two Type 035 boats were completed by 1974. Further improvements were deemed necessary and by the early 1980s a new and improved design, named the Type 035A were produced. The first of these improved "A" models entered service in 1982, with three more under construction. The latter three boats were completed and commissioned by 1990.

== Construction and career ==
She launched in October 1969 and commissioned in April 1974.

Changzheng 353 was decommissioned in 1997 and serves as a museum ship in the Tianjin Binhai Theme Park, Tianjin.
