= Type 092 submarine =

Nuclear-powered ballistic missile submarine class

- Profile of the Type 092

Class overview
- Name: Type 092
- Builders: Bohai Shipyard, Huludao
- Operators: People's Liberation Army Navy
- Preceded by: Type 031
- Succeeded by: Type 094
- Built: 1981
- In commission: 1983
- Completed: 1
- Retired: 1

History

China
- Name: No. 406
- Builder: Bohai Shipyard, Huludao
- Laid down: September 1971
- Launched: April 1981
- Commissioned: August 1983
- Decommissioned: By 2015
- Home port: Jianggezhuang Naval Base
- Identification: Pennant number: 406
- Status: Retired

General characteristics
- Type: Nuclear-powered ballistic missile submarine
- Length: 120 m (393 ft 8 in)
- Beam: 10 m (32 ft 10 in)
- Draught: 8 m (26 ft 3 in)
- Propulsion: 1 × pressurized-water nuclear reactor, 58MW; 2 × steam turbines; 1 shaft.
- Speed: 22 knots (41 km/h; 25 mph)
- Range: Unlimited
- Test depth: 300 m (984 ft 3 in)
- Complement: 100
- Armament: 6 × 533 mm torpedo tubes; 12 × JL-1A SLBMs

The Type 092 (Chinese designation: 09-II; NATO reporting name: Xia class) submarine is the first nuclear-powered ballistic missile submarine (SSBN) deployed by the People's Liberation Army Navy Submarine Force (PLANSF). Boat 406 was the only member of the class.

== Description ==
The Type 092 was designed by Peng Shilu and Huang Xuhua, essentially a Type 091 submarine with an added section for twelve JL-1 submarine-launched ballistic missiles. The missile launchers used a gas-steam generator; the generator was tested on land and on a Chinese Golf-class submarine. The output of the powerplant was increased during development; the changes were incorporated into the later Type 091 boats.

The Type 091 and 092 had similar problems. It was slow, noisy, and had powerplant reliability issues. The limitations of the submarine and the missile made their operational status and deterrence value questionable.

== History ==
The only example of the class, boat 406, was laid down at the Bohai Shipyard in September 1971. Construction was disrupted by the Cultural Revolution. It launched in April 1981 and commissioned in August 1983; Janes Fighting Ships (JFS) 2015-2016 reported an in-service year of 1987.

The boat was based at the Jianggezhuang Naval Base and rarely went to sea. Reportedly, the boat never conducted a strategic patrol outside of China's regional waters.

The boat made its first submerged test launches of the JL-1 in September 1985; the three launches were successful although the missiles failed in flight. Successful launches and flights occurred two years later.

The boat was first officially acknowledged in public during on 23 April 2009, the 60th anniversary of the PLAN.

The boat was no longer listed in JFS 2015–2016.

== Sources ==
- Carlson, Christopher P.; Wang, Howard (August 2023). "A Brief Technical History of PLAN Nuclear Submarines". China Maritime Report (30). China Maritime Studies Institute.
- Erickson, Andrew S.; Goldstein, Lyle J. (2007). "China's Future Nuclear Submarine Force: Insights from Chinese Writings". Naval War College Review. 60 (1).
