= Type 65 torpedo =

Torpedo Type 65
- Type: Heavyweight torpedo
- Place of origin: Soviet Union, Russia

Service history
- In service: 1973

Production history
- Manufacturer: Soviet Union, Russia

Specifications
- Length: 9.14m (30 ft)
- Diameter: 65 cm (25.6 in)
- Warhead: high explosive plus unused fuel
- Warhead weight: 450/557 kg
- Detonation mechanism: Proximity or contact detonation fuze
- Engine: probably gas-turbine powered by high-test peroxide, kerosene, and compressed air fuel
- Operational range: 27 nmi (50 km) at 50 kn (93 km/h), 54 nmi (100 km) at 30 kn (56 km/h)
- Maximum speed: 50 knots (93 km/h)
- Guidance system: active/passive sonar and wire guidance
- Launch platform: Submarines

The Type 65 is a torpedo manufactured in the Soviet Union and then Russia. It was developed for use against US Navy aircraft carrier battle groups, as well as large merchant targets such as supertankers and advanced enemy submarines. It is now typically fitted to newer Russian vessels, though often the 650 mm torpedo tube is fitted with a 533 mm converter to enable firing of SS-N-15 missiles or Type 53 torpedoes.

Russian officials have stated that a 65-76A modification of this torpedo is responsible for the 12 August 2000 explosion of the Russian submarine Kursk.

== Specifications (65-76) ==
- Diameter: 65 cm (25.6 in)
- Length: 9.14 m (30 ft)
- Range: 50 km at 93 km/h, 100 km at 56 km/h
- Max Speed: 50 knots (93 km/h)
- Homing: active/passive sonar and wire guidance
- Warhead: 450/557 kg high explosive
- Propulsion: Probably gas-turbine powered by high-test peroxide, kerosene, and compressed air fuel. Driving contra-rotating propellers.

== Variants ==
- 65-73 Entered service 1973, unguided torpedo. 20 kt nuclear.
- 65-76 Kit (Russian: Кит, Whale) Entered service 1976.
  - DT Length 11 m. Weight 4,500 kg. Warhead 450 kg.
  - DST92 Length 11 m. Weight 4,750 kg. Warhead 557 kg. Wake homing anti-ship weapon. Operates at 20 m depth. Sensor points upwards to detect the ship's wake, the torpedo sweeps from side to side to find the edges of the wake.
- 65-76A Kit 100 km. Entered service 1991.
