= Wake homing =

Torpedo guidance technique

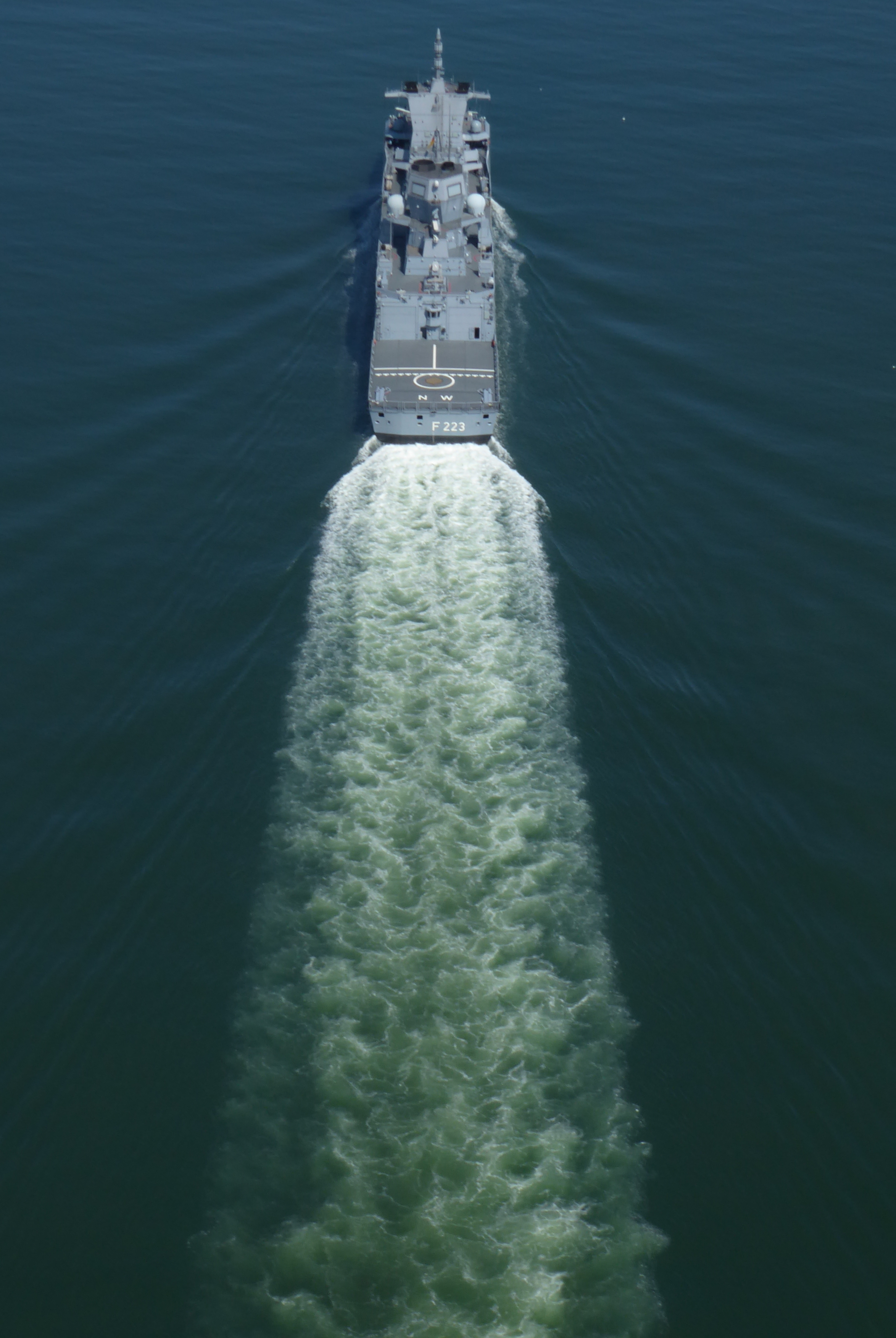
Wake behind the German frigate Nordrhein-Westfalen

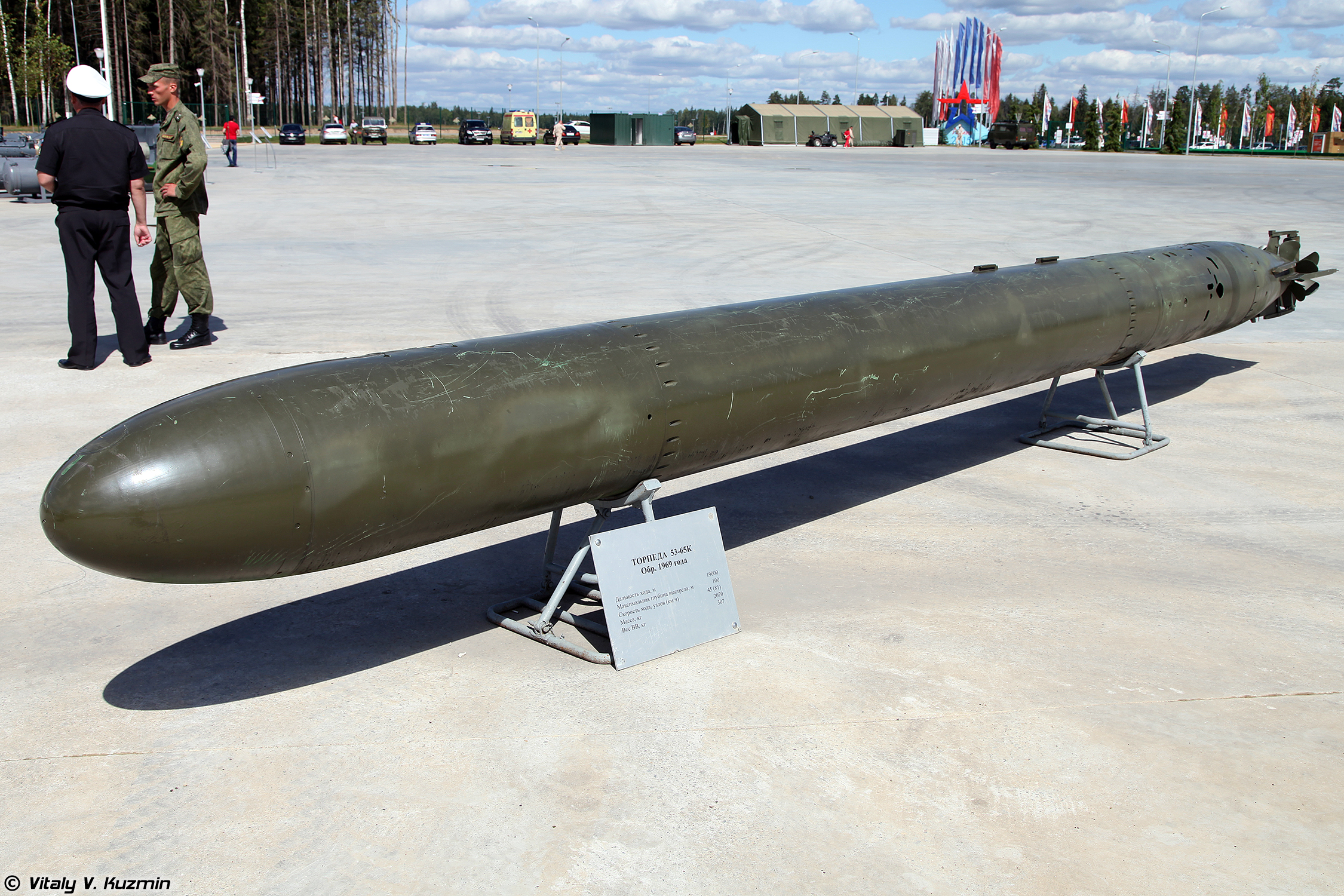
Soviet 53-65K torpedo developed during the Cold War

Wake homing is a torpedo guidance technique based on the wake trajectory left behind a moving target.

The torpedo is fired to cross behind the stern of the target ship, through the wake. As it does so, it uses sonar to look for changes in the water caused by the passage of the ship, such as small air bubbles. When these are detected, the torpedo turns toward the ship. It then follows a zig-zag course, turning when it detects the outer edge of the wake, to keep itself in the wake while moving forward. This will eventually bring it to the stern of the ship, where its warhead can do the most damage to propulsion and steering.

== Advantages and disadvantages ==
The system is difficult to jam, but it can be distracted by other ships crossing the wake. In 2013, the US Navy tested prototypes of a system known as the Countermeasure Anti-Torpedo (CAT), which had been designed to intercept and destroy the incoming torpedo. Deployment of the system did not proceed as planned due to performance issues.

The main disadvantage of wake homing is that the course taken to the target is not direct and may be far from optimal, as it mimics the target's own trajectory from the point of wake's interception onward. As the torpedo's remaining distance always increases hand-in-hand with the distance made by the vessel itself, this necessitates the torpedoes to have a significantly higher speed and longer range than normal.

Also, being an active method, sonar wake homing gives up the torpedo position. This is why it is usually supplemented by passive methods, such as thermal and refractometric wake detection. Thermal wake detection centers on locating changes in water temperature in the ship's wake. Refractometric detection senses minute changes in the water's refraction index due to air bubbles and such.

== Examples ==
- Type 53-65 (and later 53-65K and 53-65KE/TT-3) — the first mass-produced wake homing Soviet torpedo; in use with some operators of the Soviet Kilo-class submarines such as China, India, and Vietnam.
- Type 65 — Soviet torpedo of the '70s.
- Yu-6 — Chinese heavyweight torpedo.
- CHT-02D — North Korean torpedo claimed to have a wake homing capability.
- DM2A4 Seehecht (export designation "SeaHake mod 4") — modern German heavyweight torpedo.
- Roketsan Akya — modern Turkish heavyweight torpedo.
