= Export torpedoes of China =

Export torpedoes of China are Chinese-built torpedoes intended for international export. The series of torpedoes has the prefix "ET" and has been developed by the Chinese marine industrial company CSOC for export only. These torpedoes may have their domestic use correspondence but this is generally not officially admitted. Some of them have seen wide use by the navies of other countries.

The capabilities of export versions are not necessarily the same as the domestic version.

Export Torpedoes of China
| Type | Domestic | Platform | Targets | Guidance | Propulsion | Diameter | Weight | Length | Speed | Range | Warhead | Immersion |
|---|---|---|---|---|---|---|---|---|---|---|---|---|
| ET-31 | Yu-4B | submarine | ships | active/passive acoustic homing | electric motor | 533 mm | 1,755 kg | 7.748m | 30 knots | | 309 kg | |
| ET-32 | Yu-3 | submarine | | active/passive acoustic homing | electric motor | 533 mm | 1,340 kg | 6.6m | 35 knots | 13 km | 190 kg | 350 m |
| ET-34 | Yu-5 | | | active/passive acoustic homing+ wire guidance | electric motor | 533 mm | | 6.6m | 42 knots | 25 km | | 300 m |
| ET-36 | Yu-5 | | | active/passive acoustic homing+ wire guidance | electric motor | 533 mm | | 6.6m | 36 knots | 20 km | | 300 m |
| ET-38 | | submarine | submarines/ships | active acoustic/wake homing+ wire guidance | Otto fuel II | 533 mm | 1,700 kg | 6.255m | 36 /50 knots | 30/50 km | 350 kg | 7~400 m |
| ET-39 | | submarine | submarines/ships | active/passive acoustic/wake homing+ wire guidance | Otto fuel II | 533 mm | 1,700 kg | 6.255m | 28/36 /50 knots | 50 km | 350 kg | 7~400 m |
| ET-40 | | submarine | submarines/ships | active/passive acoustic/wake homing+ wire guidance | electric motor | 533 mm | 1,700 kg | 6.255m | 25/42 knots | 30/18 km | 350 kg | 5~300 m |
| ET-52C | Yu-7 | ship/rocket/helicopter | submarines | active/passive acoustic homing | Otto fuel II | 324 mm | 238 kg | 2.600m | 42 knots | 9.4 km | 45 kg | 6~450 m |
| ET-60 | | ship/plane/helicopter | submarines | active/passive acoustic homing | electric motor | 324 mm | 240 kg | 2.600m | 42 knots | 10 km | 45 kg | 6~450 m |
| ET-80 | Yu-8E | ship (rocket) | submarines | active/passive acoustic homing | | 324 mm | | | | 30 km | 45 kg | |
| ET-81 | Yu-11E | ship/rocket/helicopter | submarines | active/passive acoustic homing | | 324 mm | | | | | 45 kg | |

^ Italics are not officially published parameters
