= Yu-4 torpedo =

Yu-4 Torpedo
- Type: Heavyweight ASuW torpedo
- Place of origin: China

Service history
- In service: 1982(Yu-4A); 1987(Yu-4B)
- Used by: People's Liberation Army Navy; Bangladesh Navy; Korean People's Navy

Production history
- Designer: CSSC
- Designed: early 1960s – December 1982
- Manufacturer: Pinyang Machinery Factory, Houma, Shanxi
- Produced: 1982 -
- Variants: Yu-4A, Yu-4B

Specifications
- Mass: 1,775 kg (1,628 kg for the training version)
- Length: 7.75 m
- Diameter: 533 mm
- Warhead weight: 309 kg
- Engine: electrical, silver-zinc battery
- Operational range: 6 km (original) at 30 knots (56 km/h); 15 km (upgraded) @ 40 knots (74 km/h)
- Maximum speed: 30 knots (56 km/h) or 40 knots (75 km) upgraded
- Guidance system: acoustic homing: Yu-4A: passive, Yu-4B: active/passive
- Launch platform: Submarine

Yu-4 (鱼-4) torpedo is the Chinese development of the Russian SAET-50 ASuW passive acoustic homing torpedo, and it is the Russian SAET-50 torpedo incorporating active acoustic homing guidance. Yu-4 torpedo is often erroneously claimed by many sources as the Chinese version of the SAET-60 acoustic homing torpedo, but Soviets had not completed the development of SAET-60 and only fielded the weapon in 1961, by then the relationship between former-Soviet Union and China had already worsened and China had not received any technical assistance on SAET-60 torpedo. The background of the development of Yu-4 torpedo is identical to that of Yu-1 torpedo and Yu-2 torpedo.

== Background ==
In August, 1958, the deputy chief-of-staff of PLA Zhang Aiping and the deputy commander-in-chief of PLAN Luo Shunchu (罗舜初) led a military delegation to visit former-Soviet Union signed a deal with Soviets to produce three types of Soviet torpedoes in China. In comparison with other military programs each with dozens or even hundreds of Soviet advisors, however, the former-Soviet Union did not put too much emphasis on torpedo capability: the total number of Soviet advisors initially sent to China for all of its torpedo programs was only five. The Soviet Union quickly delivered the samples and technical information of the three types of torpedoes to China with the five advisors to China as promised. Two Soviet advisors were assigned to assist China to produce the RAT-52 rocket-powered torpedo at No. 123 Factory, while others were assigned to teach China about compressed oxygen powered torpedo and SAET-50 acoustic homing torpedoes. In July 1960, the first two samples of Chinese-built rocket propelled torpedoes were completed. Type 920 electrical propulsion system and electronics of the electrically powered passive acoustic homing torpedo had also been completed, while the basic technologies of compressed oxygen torpedoes were also mastered by China.

Everything appeared to be great but the subsequent Sino-Soviet split ended the promising future: from July 28 to September 1, 1960, former-Soviet Union had quickly withdrawn all of its advisors from China. Compounding the problem, other domestic political turmoil such as Great Leap Forward further hindered the Chinese development of torpedoes. The 7th Academy consequently ordered the 705th Research Institute to lead a team consisted of No. 724 Factory, Pinyang Machinery Factory (平阳机械厂, also known as Factory 874) in Houma, Shanxi, and East Wind Instrumentation Factory (东风仪表厂, also known as Factory 872) in Xi'an to indigenously manufacture Soviet compressed oxygen powered torpedo. In 1962, Field Marshal Nie Rongzhen ordered all resources to be concentrated on achieving the goal of fielding “two boats and a torpedo” (Two boats: torpedo boat and submarine, torpedo: heavy torpedo of 533 mm diameter). In July, 1962, researchers at 705th Institute concluded that despite having samples and design drawings, compressed oxygen powered torpedoes was unsafe and after numerous accidental explosions, they were rarely used by the Soviet Navy, and Chinese navy was not happy with oxygen powered torpedo either. Chinese researchers recommended steam powered torpedo instead, and in the following year, PLAN issued an order to first develop steam powered torpedo, and then the electrically powered acoustic homing torpedo. The electrically powered Yu-4 torpedo program was put on hold despite the earlier successful development of components.

== Development ==
The progress made in the development of the Yu-3 torpedo had encouraged the Chinese to resume the development of the Yu-4 torpedo after several years of dormancy which begun in the early 1960s. At the end of 1971, 5 samples were produced based on the experience gained in the development of the Yu-3 torpedo. However, the speed was low and other results were not satisfactory either. The Chinese researchers decided to take a prudent approach by developing two different versions, one with passive acoustic homing guidance and the other with combined passive / active acoustic homing guidance. The one with passive acoustic homing begun its development in the mid-1960s and was named as Yu-4 Jia (鱼-4甲), or sometimes as Yu-4A, while the combined active / passive acoustic homing version begun its development in the late-1960s and named as Yu-4 Yi (鱼-4乙) or sometimes as Yu-4B. Yu-4A was designed by the East Wind Instrumentation Factory (东风仪表厂) in Xi'an, while Y-4B was designed jointly by Northwestern Polytechnical University (primary contractor) and Pinyang Machinery Factory (平阳机械厂) in Houma, Shanxi. Pinyang Machinery Factory (平阳机械厂) was tasked with manufacturing both Yu-4A and Y-4B.

In March 1977, Yu-4A went through first oceanic tests and was considered meeting most of the requirements. Further tests in September, 1979 indicated that the last two problems still existed: the high level of noise generated by the motor and the accidental arming of the fuse. After efforts were spent to attack the problems, the sample Yu-4A torpedoes were once again tested in June, 1980, proving that the problems appeared to be solved. However, after 78 sample torpedoes had been test fired in July, 1981, it was revealed that the problem of the fuse still existed despite drastic reduction of the occurrence, and more worked was needed. Finally, in December 1982, all problems were solved and Yu-4A went into series production. Yu-4B, on the other hand, experienced more difficulties and new measures had to be developed, including replacing the original mechanically scanned equipment with electronically scanned equipment to improve the accuracy of depth setting and a new electro-magnetic fuse. In March 1987, after the final test of 63 torpedoes, Yu-4B was accepted into service and went into series production. The export version of Yu-4B designated as ET31.

== Specification ==
- Diameter: 533 mm
- Length: 7.75 m
- Weight: 1,775 kg (1,628 kg for the training version)
- Warhead: 309 kg
- Guidance: acoustic homing: Yu-4A: passive, Yu-4B: active/passive
- Propulsion: electrical, silver-zinc battery
- Range: 6 km (original) @ 30 knots (56 km/h), 15 km (upgraded) @ 40 knots (74 km/h)
- Speed: 30 kt (56 km/h) or 40 kt (75 km) upgraded
- Depth: N/A, ASuW torpedo

== Modification ==
Due to the adoption of newer technologies such as the silver-zinc battery, the performance of Yu-4 torpedo has exceeded the Russian SAET-50 torpedo it is based on, and reached that of SAET-50M: the speed of the Yu-4 torpedo is increased more than 25% to 30 knots (56 km/h), even 1 knot (1.9 km/h) faster than the SAET-50M, and the range is increased 50% to 6 km, equal to that of SAET-50M. For these reasons, the Yu-4 torpedo is considered at least equal or better than Russian SAET-50M torpedo, the successor of SAET-50 torpedo, and even comparable to Russian SAET-60 torpedo in some aspects. However, the 6 km range was considered rather short for modern naval warfare by the Chinese navy, which led to one of the major upgrade resulted in increased range (up to 15 km), and in comparison to Yu-1 torpedo, there were not as many Yu-4 torpedoes entering service like Yu-1 torpedo. Like Yu-1 torpedo, Yu-4 torpedoes in Chinese inventory have been continuously modified, such as incorporating ASW capability, updated electronics and propulsion system, and being converted as part of CAPTOR mine type mine systems.

== See also ==
- Export torpedoes of China
