= Bohai Shipyard =

Shipyard in China

Coordinates: 40°42′55″N 121°00′37″E

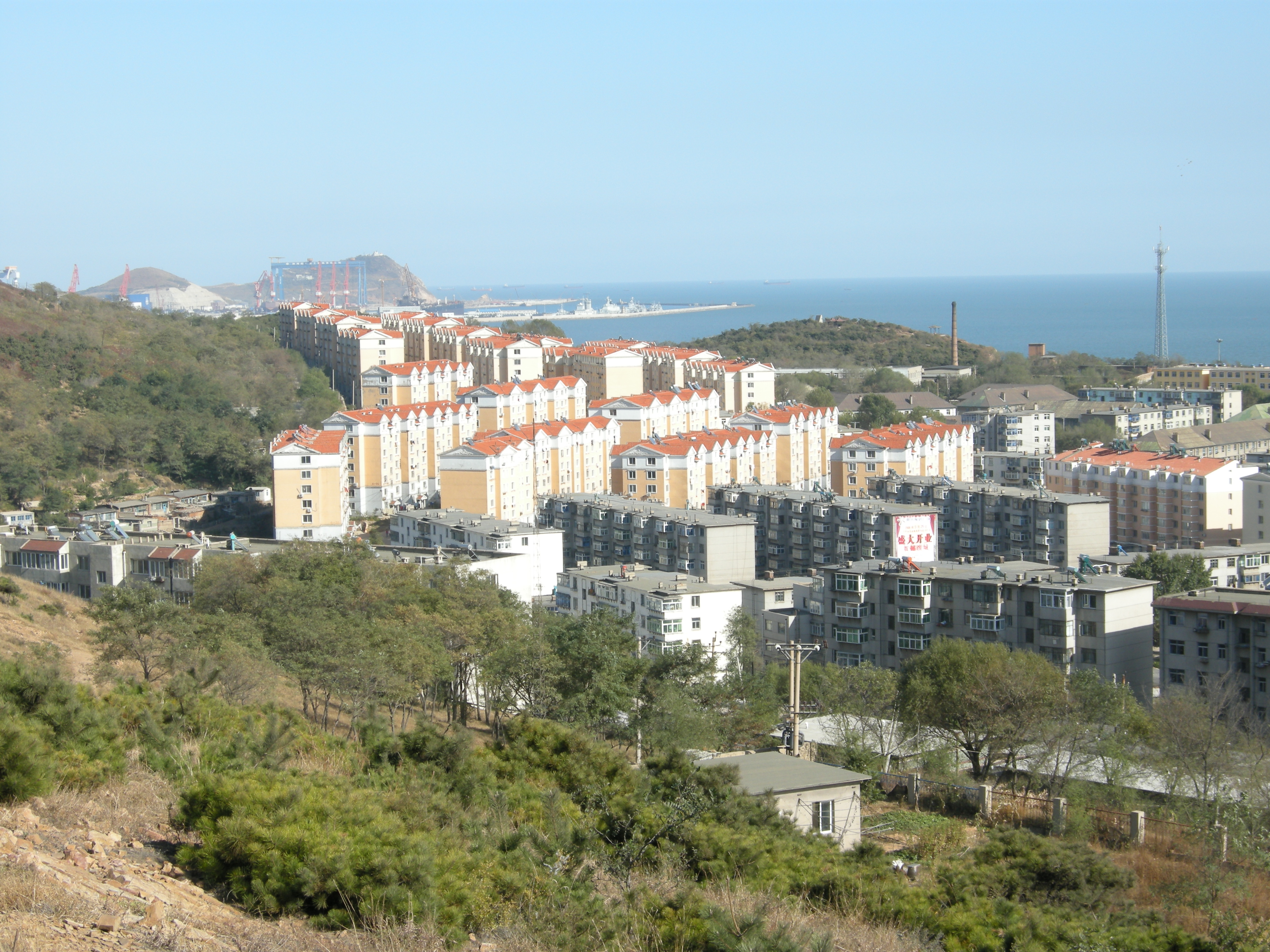
Shipyard and naval base in the background

The Bohai Shipbuilding Heavy Industry Company (BSHIC) is a shipyard in Huludao, China. It builds civilian and military vessels; it is China's first and only shipyard for nuclear submarines It is a part of the China State Shipbuilding Corporation. It was formerly called the Bohai Shipyard.

== History ==
The Bohai shipyard was founded in 1954 with a small slipway. Expansion in the 1960s included a large building hall with four submarine building bays and a graving dock. Construction of nuclear submarine started in November 1968.

From 2003 to 2007, the yard expanded around the basin to the east. A fitting out wharf was added to the north shore, and two graving docks were built on the east shore.

At one point it was part of the China Shipbuilding Industry Corporation and directly owned by the Dalian Shipbuilding Industry Company.

From 2008 to 2015, the yard gained 185 acres (750,000 m^{2}) through land reclamation to the east. In 2015, additional submarine construction facilities began construction on the new land on with the first stage completed in 2019. By 2024, this added 20 more submarine building bays.

In 2017, the yard claimed to have China's largest covered berths, two 300,000 DWT dry docks, a 150,000 DWT semi-dock building berth, and a 50,000 DWT flooding dock. It could build ships up to 400,000 DWT with an annual output of 4,000,000 DWT.

== Sources ==
- Carlson, Christopher P.; Wang, Howard (August 2023). "A Brief Technical History of PLAN Nuclear Submarines". China Maritime Report (30). China Maritime Studies Institute.
- Kirchberger, Sarah (September 2023). "China's Submarine Industrial Base: State-Led Innovation with Chinese Characteristics". China Maritime Report (31). China Maritime Studies Institute.
- OECD Shipbuilding Unit (April 2021). "Report on China's shipbuilding industry and policies affecting it". OECD Science, Technology and Industry Policy Papers (105). Paris: OECD Publishing.
