= Yu-3 torpedo =

The Yu-3 (鱼-3) is a Chinese acoustic homing torpedo designed to be fired from submarines against surface targets. It entered service with the Chinese Navy in 1984. Several sources state that it may be a copy of the Soviet SET-65E, although this seems unlikely as development began in 1965 after the Sino-Soviet split. It is therefore probably the first indigenously developed torpedo in China.

== See also ==
- Export torpedoes of China
