= ORP Wilk =

Two ships of the Polish Navy have been named ORP Wilk:

- ORP Wilk (1929), a Wilk-class submarine launched in 1929 and scrapped in 1954
- ORP Wilk (292), a Foxtrot-class submarine acquired in 1987
