= S-350 =

S-350 may refer to:

- Soviet submarine S-350
- Vityaz missile system (S-350E)
- S-350 (drug)
