= Scorpion (submarine) =

The name Scorpion may refer to one of the following submarines:

- Soviet submarine B-427, a Whiskey type submarine operated by the Soviet and Russian navies from 1971 until 1994. The submarine was sold into civilian use, and has been promoted under the name "Podvodnaya Lodka B-427 Scorpion" after being put on display at Long Beach, California in 1998
- USS Scorpion (SS-278), a Gato-class submarine that entered service in 1942, and sank from unknown damage in 1944
- USS Scorpion (SSN-589), a Skipjack-class submarine that entered service in 1960, and sank for unknown reasons in 1968

== See also ==
- Scorpène-class submarine, a class of three active and nineteen total planned submarines. Scorpène is French for scorpion fish
