= Diving plane =

Control surface on a submarine

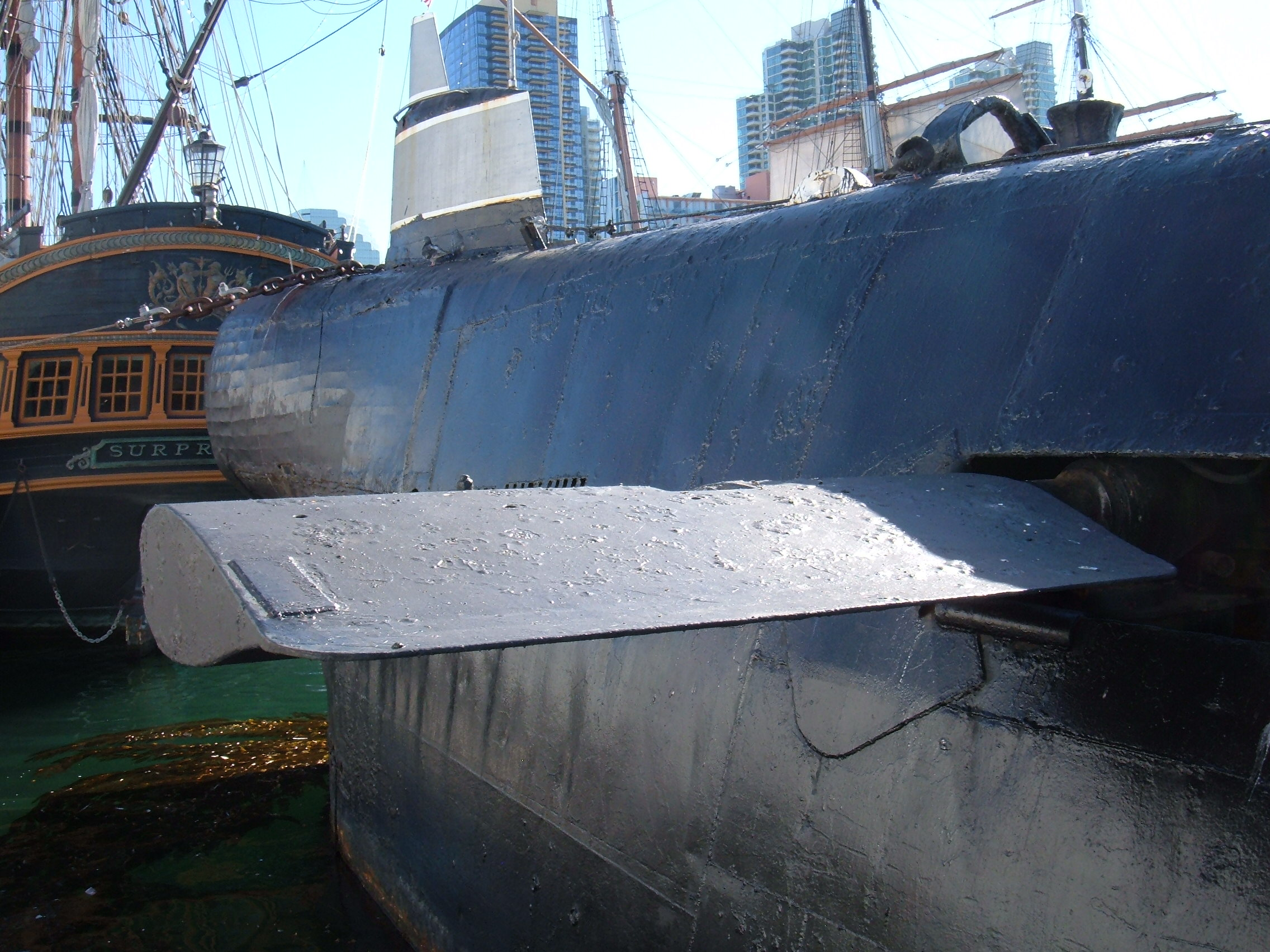
The port bow plane of the Soviet-era submarine B-39

Diving planes, also known as hydroplanes, are control surfaces found on a submarine which allow the vessel to pitch its bow and stern up or down to assist in the process of submerging or surfacing the boat, as well as controlling depth when submerged.

== Bow and stern planes ==
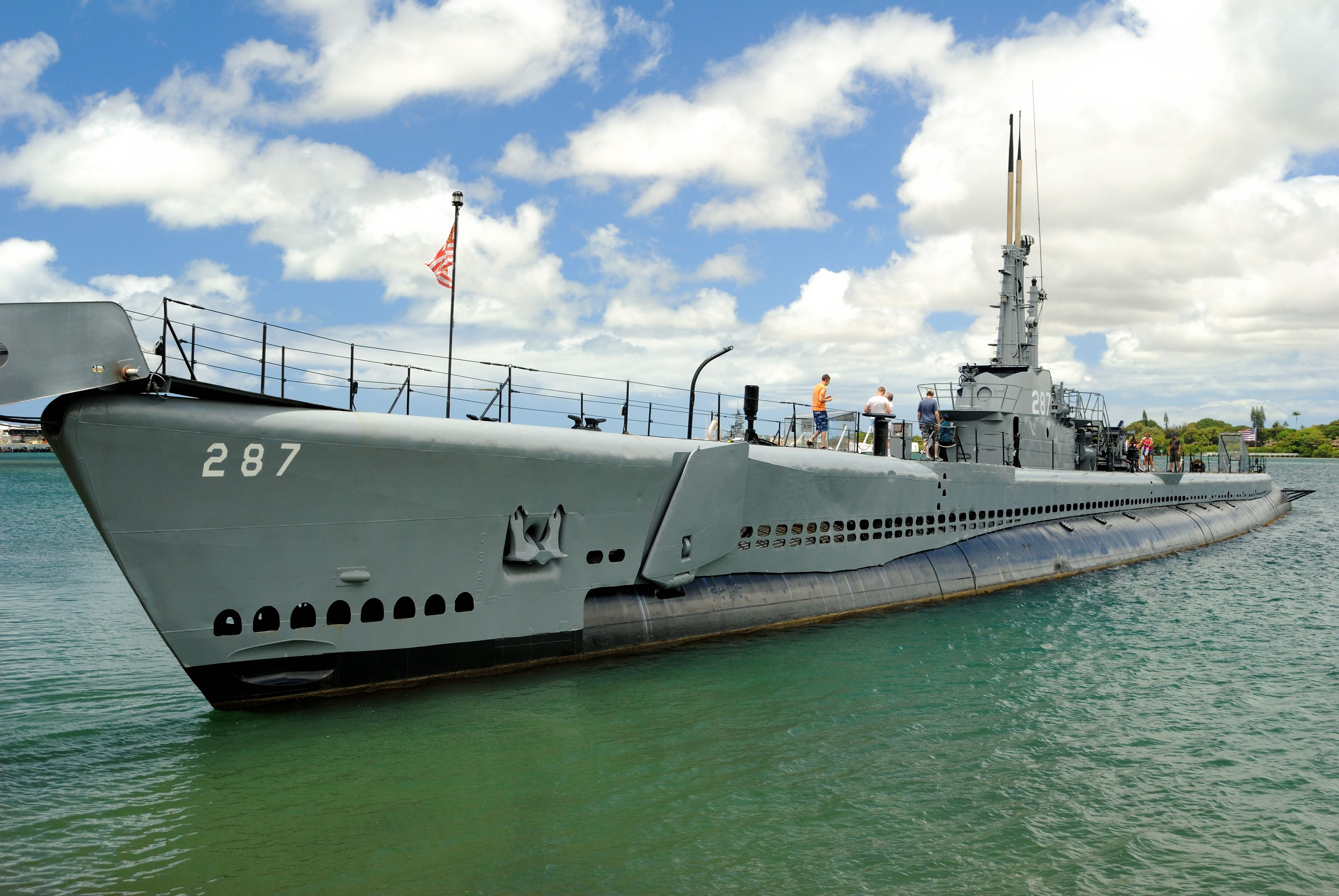
US Balao-class USS Bowfin of World War II, showing bow planes rigged upwards for stowage

Diving planes are usually fitted in two pairs, the bow planes at the front of the submarine and the stern planes at the rear. The stern planes function in much the same way as an aircraft's elevator. As the planes are a long distance fore-and-aft from the hull's centre of buoyancy, they introduce a pitching moment. Ballast tanks within the submarine adjust buoyancy to be neutral, making the boat controllable. The position of the planes controls the pitch of the boat and, with the forward motion of the boat, this controls depth. If not carefully controlled, this could lead to a 'porpoising' motion whereby the planesman continually hunts for a stable combination of depth and pitch.

For easier berthing close alongside a jetty, submarines have used folding bow planes that retracted alongside the hull. Earlier submarines (to World War II) used vertical-folding planes perpendicular to their surface. US submarines referred to this stowage as 'rigging' the planes, and 'tilting' for their control movement. Later Soviet submarines have tended to fold backwards, into recesses in the casing.

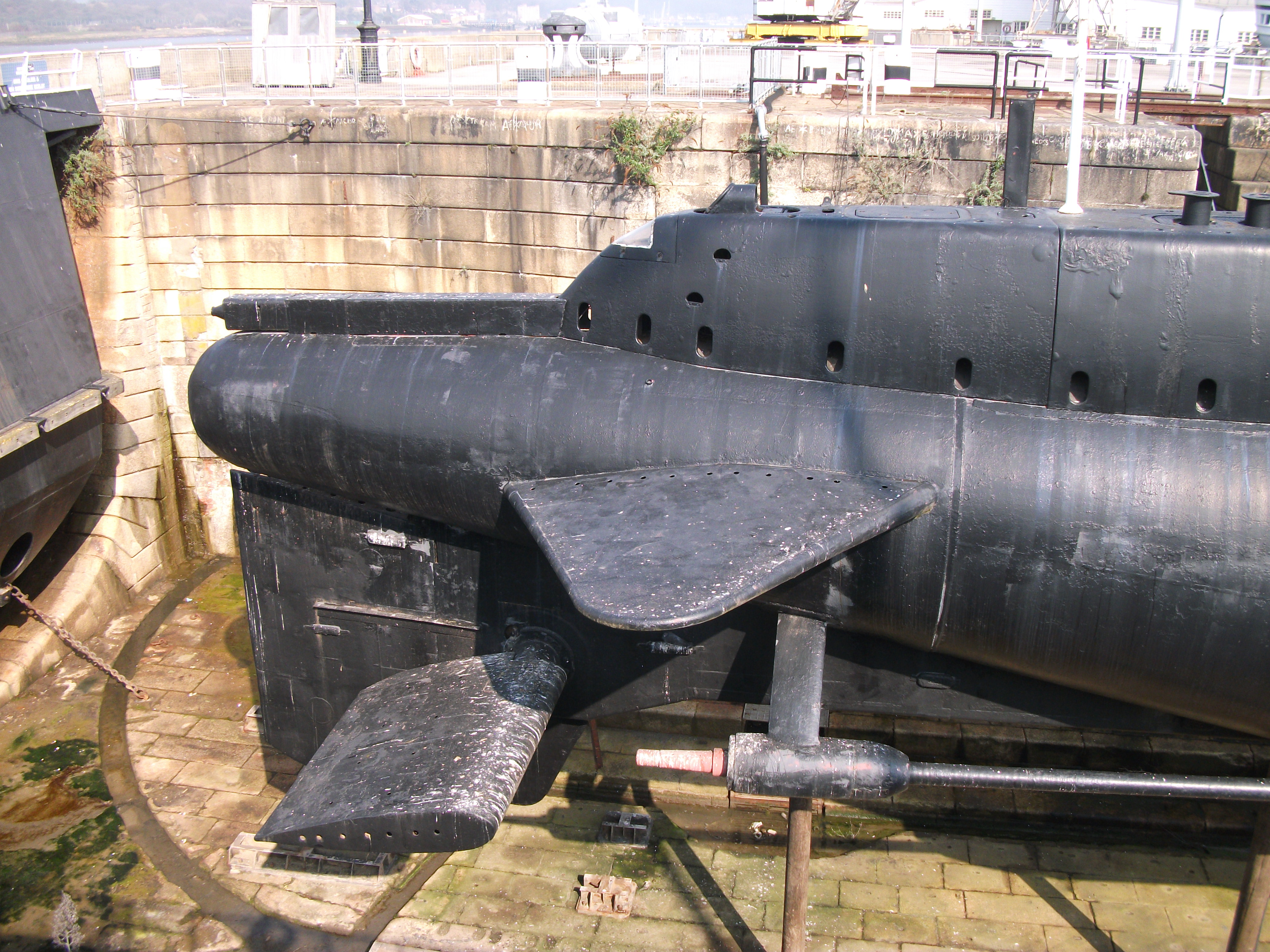
Stern planes of HMS Ocelot mounted directly in the prop wake, with fixed planes above.

== Fairwater planes ==
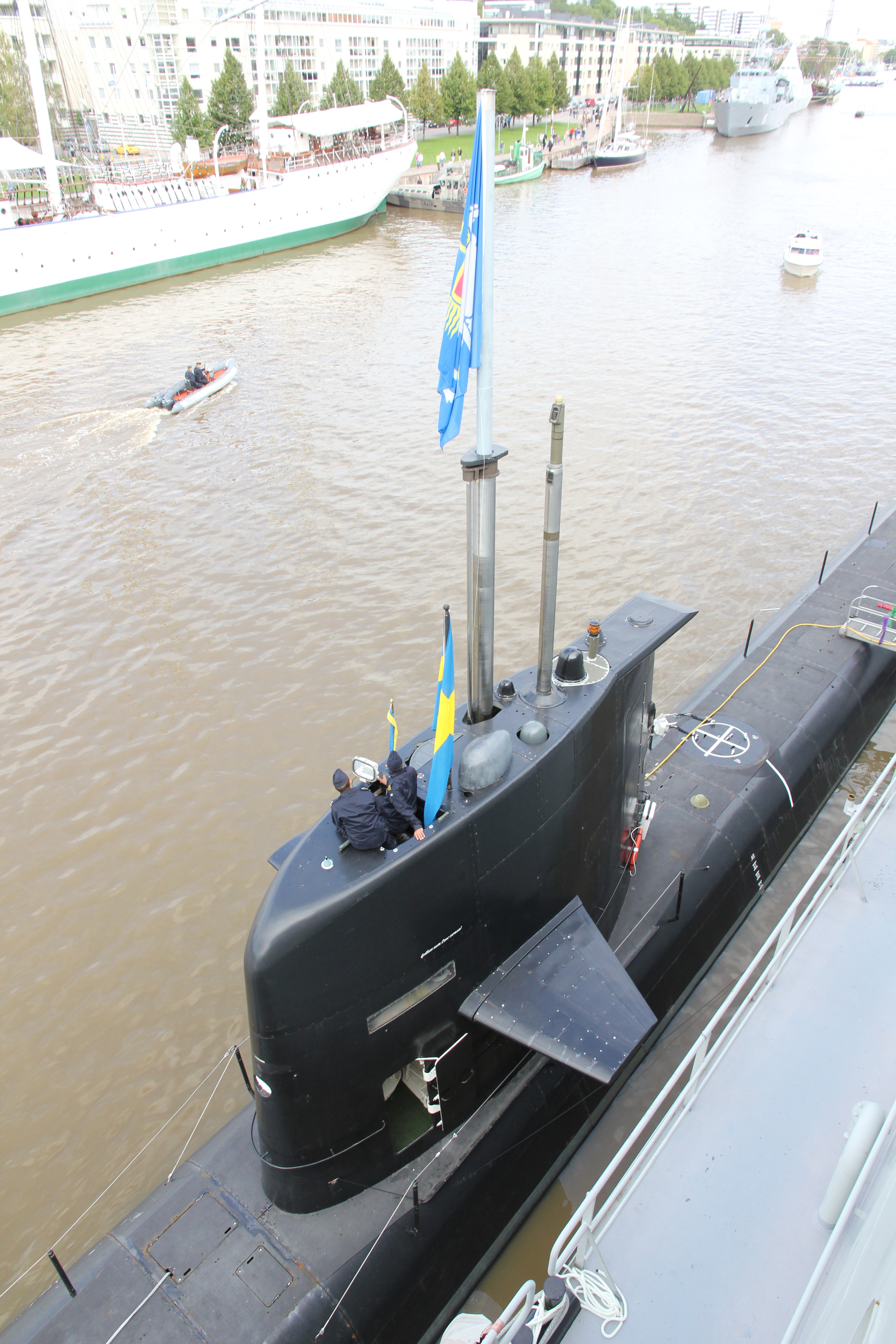
HSwMS Gotland from above, showing fairwater planes mounted on the sail

Simon Lake of the Lake Torpedo Boat Company was the first to develop planes that could control depth without introducing a pitching moment. Stern planes and rudder were mounted below the stern akin to a conventional ship. The depth control planes were mounted on the beam, so that they acted vertically, without the lever arm to introduce the usual pitch.

Diving planes located on the sail (conning tower) are called fairwater planes on US Navy submarines. Fairwater planes do not pitch the ship up or down; they cause the boat to rise or sink on a level plane as they are operated.

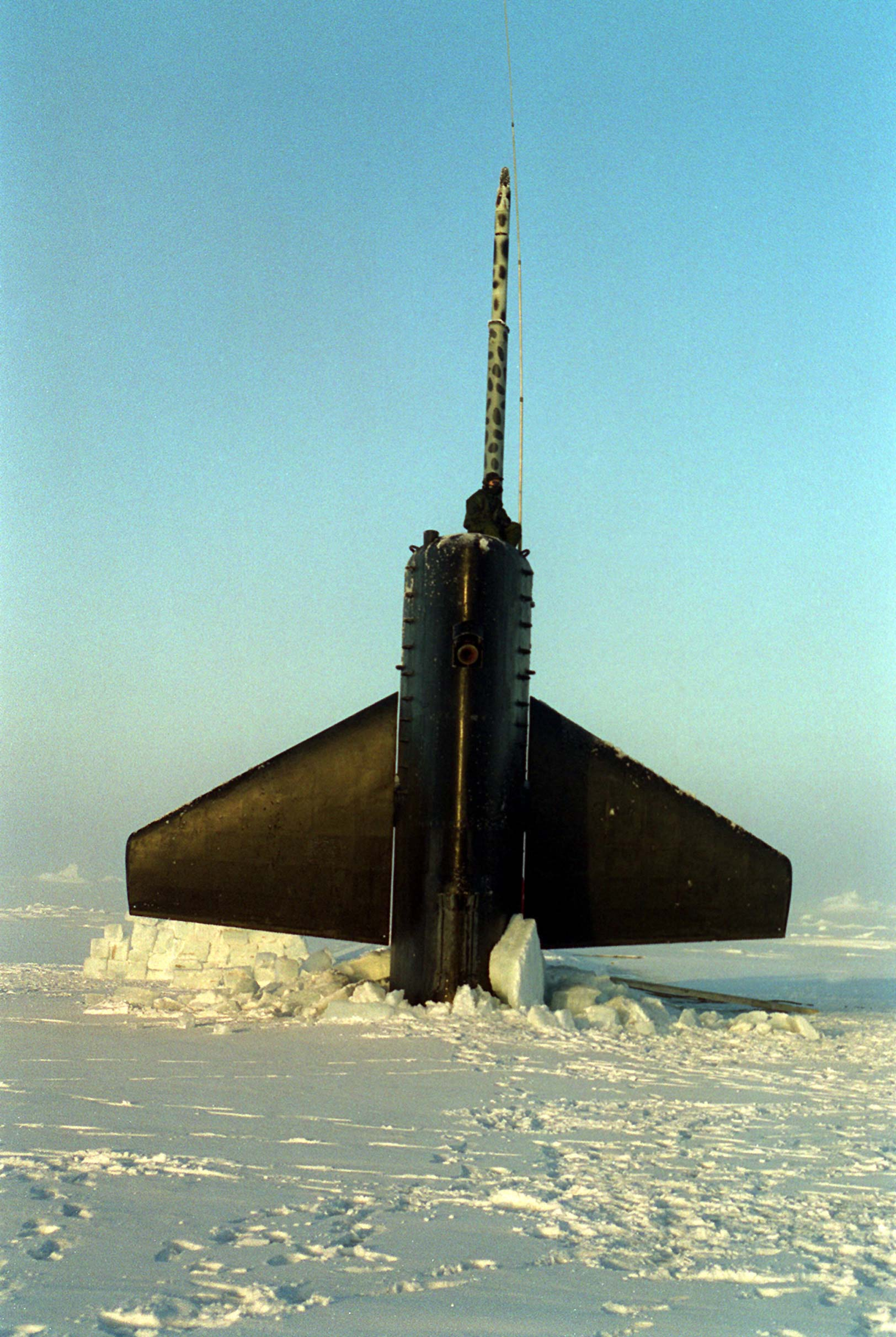
USS Pogy surfaced through Arctic ice, with sail-mounted planes turned vertically

When operating beneath polar ice, a submarine with planes on the sail must break them through the ice when surfacing. From the Sturgeon class they were arranged to be able to be pointed vertically upwards, rather than being rigged or folded in.

Newer boats, starting with the third-flight Los Angeles class subs (or 688is) have eliminated the sail planes, and operate instead with bow planes.

== Controls ==
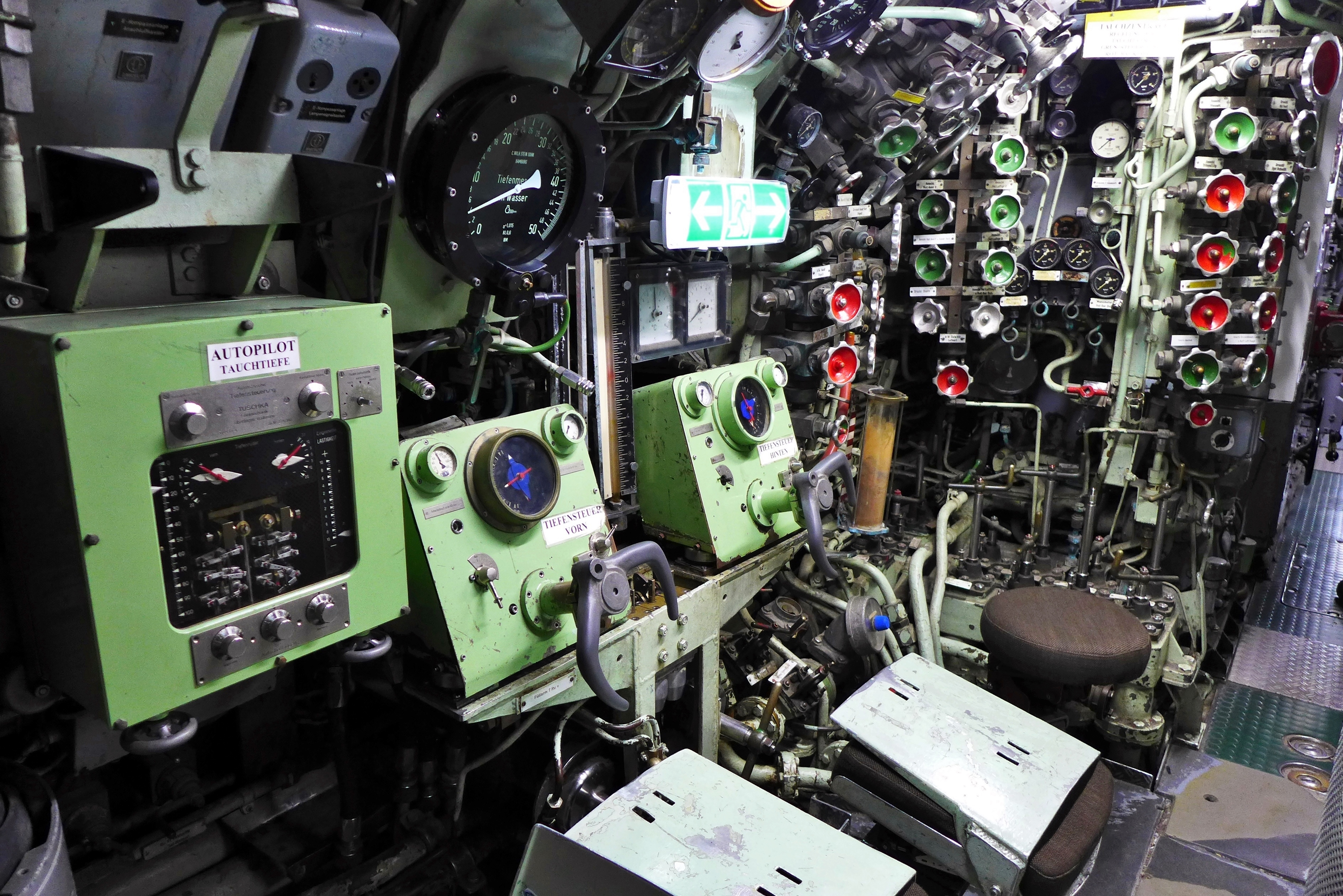
Control room of U-9 with separate operator positions for fore and stern planes

From the outset, diving planes were controlled remotely by telemotors, early servomechanisms operated electrically or by hydraulics.

Maintaining depth in a submarine is a sophisticated task. The planesman was provided with a prominent depth gauge to monitor this, usually a circular Bourdon gauge. For precise maintenance at periscope depth an additional shallow-depth manometer, a transparent vertical pipe, would be provided too. With the development of active sonar, depth control became even more complex. Rather than maintaining a simple depth, the planesman must now keep the boat beneath a thermocline in order to hide from sonar. To this end, the helm position may also show external water thermometers and salinometers.

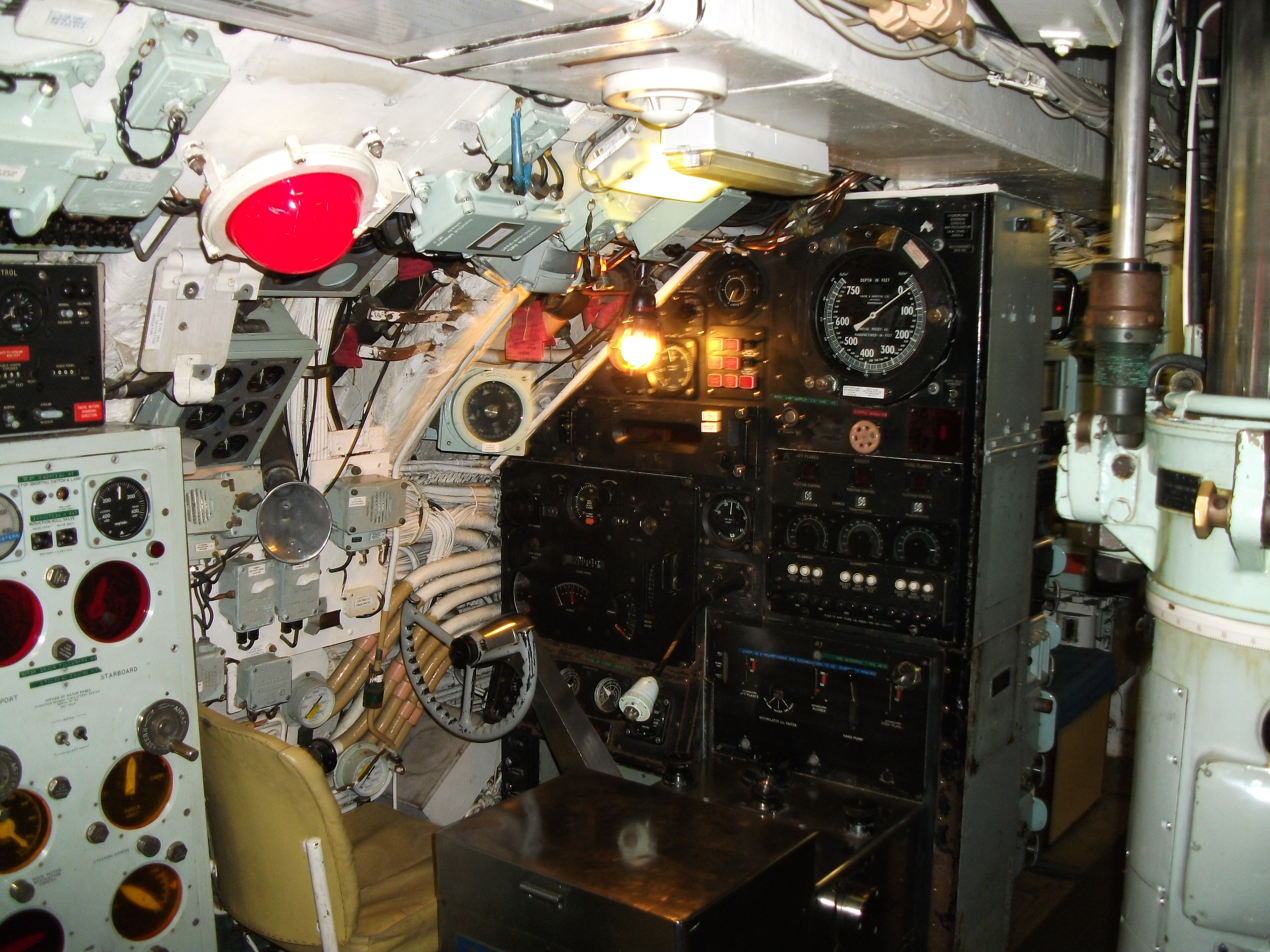
Combined helm of HMS Ocelot

Early submarines had separate controls for each pair of planes, bow and stern. Together with the helmsman, this required three ratings in the already-crowded control room. By the 1960s, combined controls were introduced. These incorporated all planes onto a single aircraft-style control wheel.

== Cars ==
In automotive terms, dive planes, also known as canards, (which physically resemble submarine diving planes) are aerodynamic devices fitted on cars just ahead of the front wheels. They are most commonly found on racing cars such as the Le Mans Prototype Series and are used to create additional downforce and channel airflow to help balance the car. The 2012 Mercedes-Benz C63 AMG Black Series is one of the first road cars to feature these devices.
