= ORP Dzik (293) =

Submarine of the Polish Navy

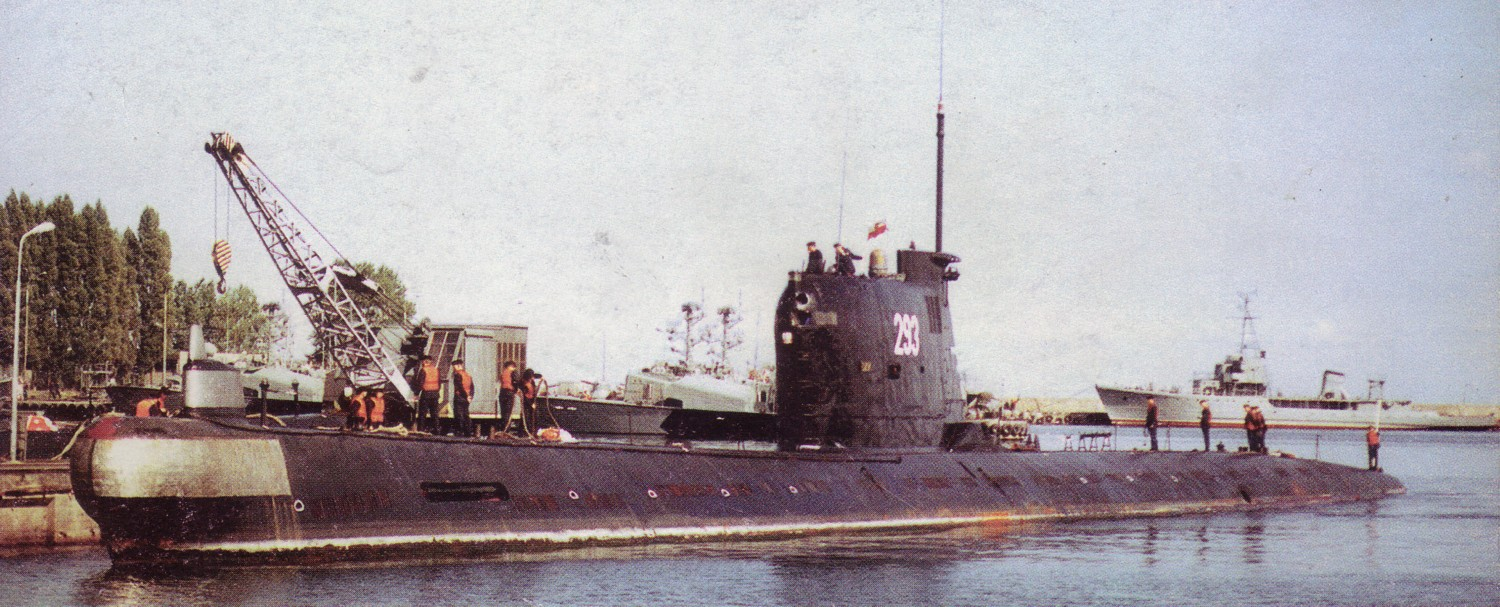
ORP Dzik

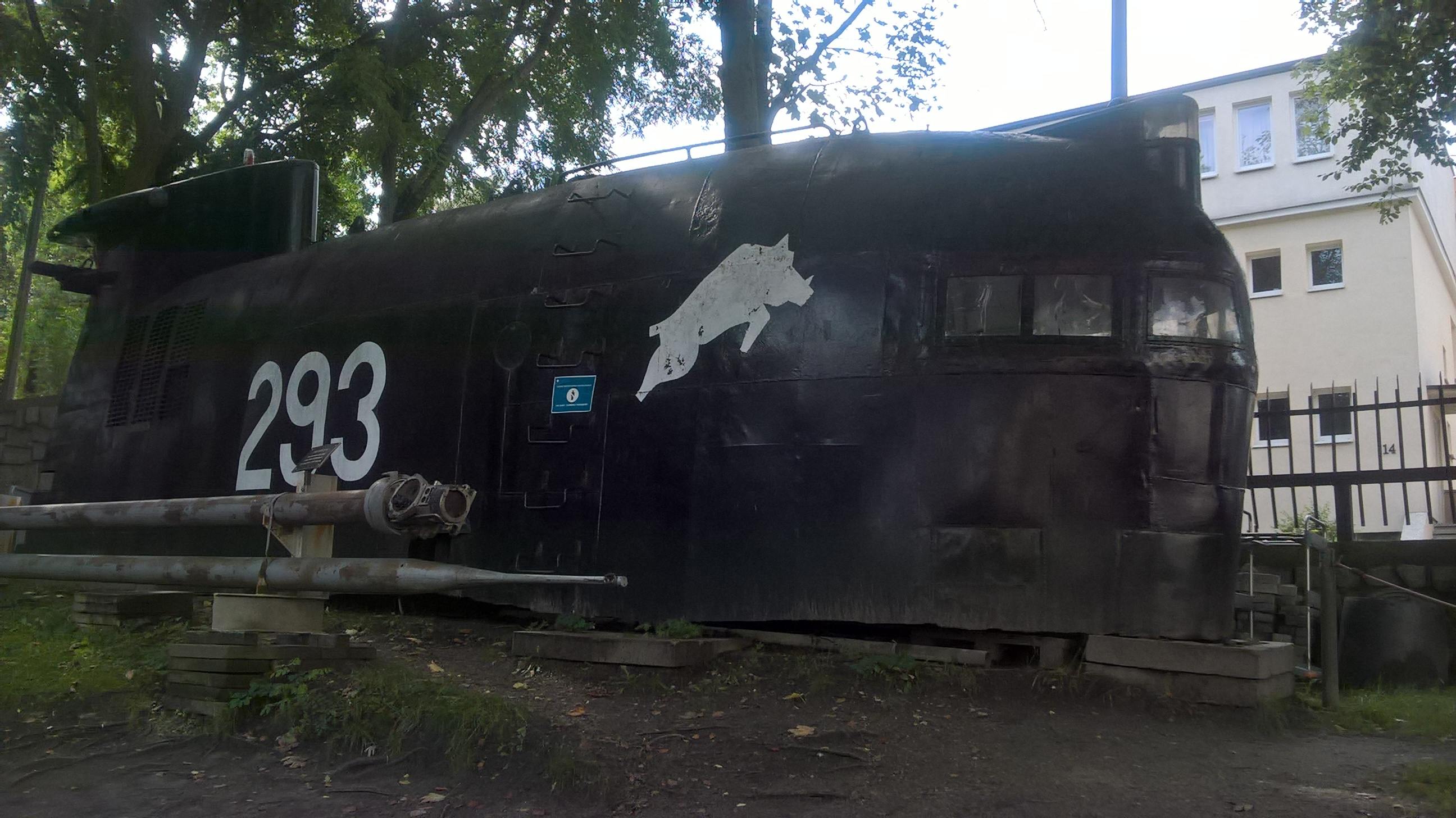
Dzik's fairwater on display in Gdynia

ORP Dzik was a Foxtrot-class submarine, in service with the Polish Navy from 1988 to 2003. It was built in 1966 in the Soviet Union. It was scrapped in May 2005, though the fairwater was preserved.
