= Soviet submarine S-350 =

History

Soviet Union
- Name: S-350
- Fate: Sank, January 11, 1962; returned to service, 1966

General characteristics
- Class & type: Romeo-class attack submarine
- Displacement: 1,475 tons surfaced; 1,830 tons submerged
- Length: 76.6 m (251 ft 3 in)
- Beam: 6.7 m (22 ft)
- Draught: 5.2 m (17 ft 1 in)
- Propulsion: Two diesels delivering 2.94 MW (4000 shp) with two electric motors driving two shafts.
- Speed: 15.2 knots surfaced; 13 knots submerged
- Range: 14,484km (9,000 miles) at 9 knots
- Complement: 54 men (10 officers)
- Sensors & processing systems: sonar and radar
- Electronic warfare & decoys: MRP 11-14
- Armament: 8 × 533mm (21in) torpedo tubes. Six located in the bow and two in the stern.; 14 × 533mm (21in) anti ship or anti submarine torpedoes (including Yu-4 and Yu-1 torpedoes) or 28 mines

The S-350 was a Romeo-class attack submarine built for the Soviet Navy during the Cold War.

== Fate ==
On January 11, 1962, the Soviet Foxtrot class submarine B-37 exploded as the result of a fire which detonated all torpedo warheads in the submarine. The S-350, which was moored next to B-37, was heavily damaged. Eleven crew members of the S-350 were killed. The submarine was salvaged, repaired and returned to service in 1966.

== Bibliography ==
- Polmar, Norman & Moore, Kenneth J. (2004). Cold War Submarines: The Design and Construction of U.S. and Soviet Submarines. Washington, D. C.: Potomac Books. ISBN 978-1-57488-594-1.
