= Soviet submarine B-37 =

Soviet diesel submarine, in service from 1959 to 1962

History

Soviet Union
- Name: B-37
- Laid down: 18 July 1958
- Launched: 5 November 1958
- Commissioned: 5 November 1959
- Fate: Exploded and sank on 11 January 1962

General characteristics
- Class & type: Foxtrot-class submarine
- Displacement: 1,952 long tons (1,983 t) surfaced; 2,475 long tons (2,515 t) submerged
- Length: 89.9 m (294 ft 11 in)
- Beam: 7.4 m (24 ft 3 in)
- Draft: 5.9 m (19 ft 4 in)
- Propulsion: 3 × Kolomna 2D42M 2,000 hp (1,500 kW) diesel engines; 3 × Electric motors, two 1,350 hp (1,010 kW) and one 2,700 hp (2,000 kW); 1 × 180 hp (130 kW) auxiliary motor; 3 shafts, each with 6-bladed propellers
- Speed: 16 knots (30 km/h) surfaced; 15 knots (28 km/h) submerged; 9 knots (17 km/h) snorkeling
- Range: 20,000 nmi (37,000 km) at 8 kn (15 km/h) surfaced; 11,000 nmi (20,000 km) snorkeling; 380 nmi (700 km) at 2 kn (3.7 km/h) submerged
- Endurance: 3–5 days submerged
- Test depth: 246–296 m (807–971 ft)
- Complement: 12 officers, 10 warrants, 56 seamen
- Armament: 10 × torpedo tubes (6 bow, 4 stern); 22 torpedoes

Soviet submarine B-37 (Russian: Б-37) was a Project 641 or Foxtrot-class diesel submarine of the Soviet Navy's Northern Fleet.

== Service history ==
On 11 January 1962, the submarine was tied up at the pier in Ekaterininsky Bay of Polyarny naval base, with all watertight doors open, while conducting maintenance and testing of her torpedoes. A fire broke out in the torpedo compartment, probably due to hydrogen gas igniting when electrical equipment was energized. All eleven torpedoes cooked off. The submarine was instantly destroyed with all hands except the commanding officer Captain Second Rank Begeba who was on the pier at the time of explosion, and Captain Third Rank Jakubenko, who was on another part of the sub base.

S-350, a Project 633 or Romeo-class submarine tied up next to B-37, was badly damaged by the explosion as well, and several men from other ships and the shipyard were killed.

In total, 122 people were killed: 59 B-37 crewmen, 19 S-350 crewmen, and 44 others. The explosion hurled B-37's anchor nearly 2 kilometers (1.2 mi) from the dock.
