= Ukrainian submarine Zaporizhzhia =

1970 Foxtrot-class submarine

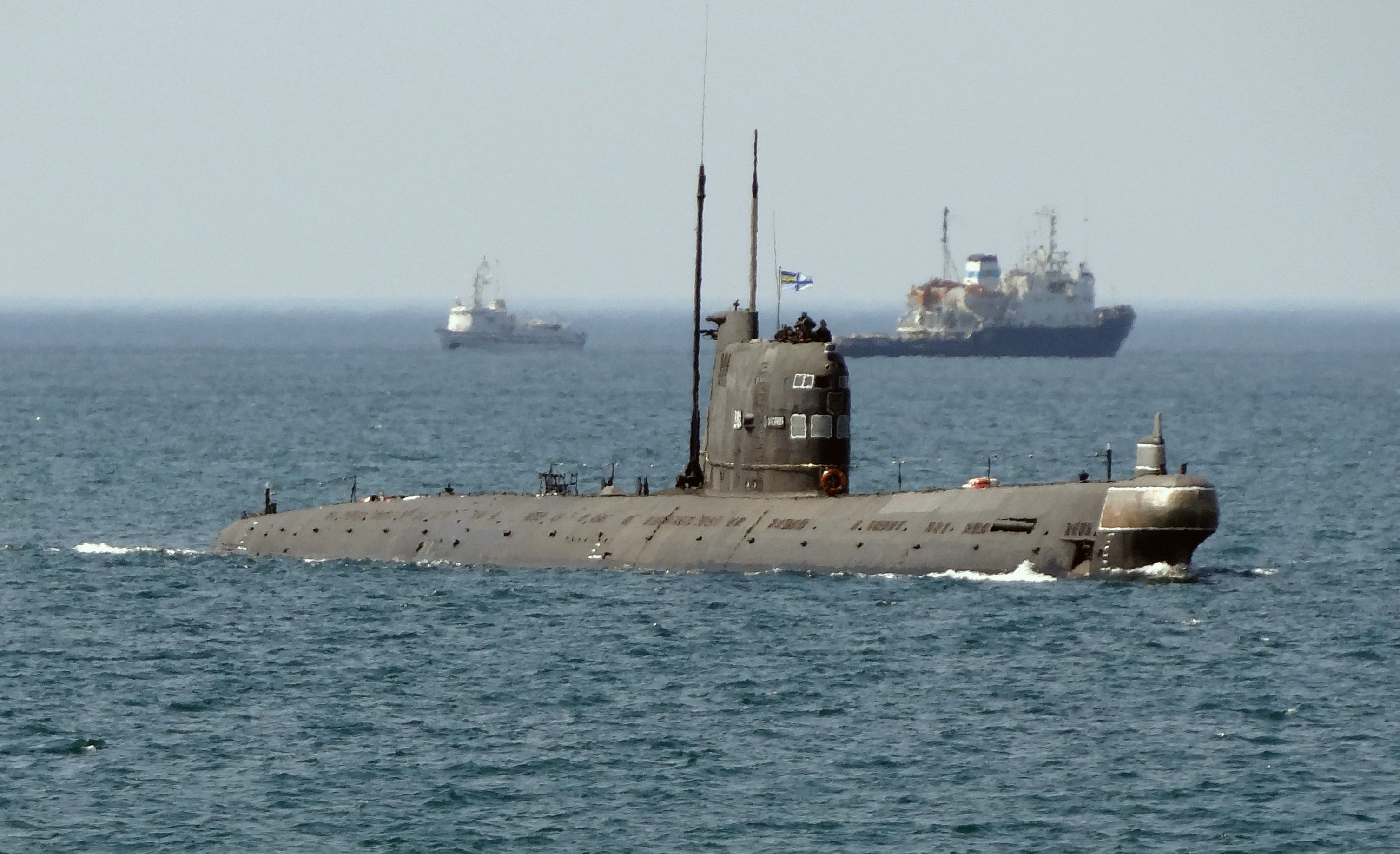
- Zaporizhzhia (U-01)

History

/ Soviet Union / Russian Federation
- Name: B-435
- Builder: New Admiralty Shipyard
- Laid down: 23 March 1970
- Launched: 29 June 1970
- Commissioned: 1970
- In service: 1970
- Out of service: 1997

Ukraine
- Name: U-001 Zaporizhzhia
- Namesake: city of Zaporizhzhia
- In service: 1997
- Out of service: 2014 (See 'Captured' entry)
- Renamed: 1997
- Home port: Sevastopol
- Captured: Surrendered to / Captured by Russian Forces in March, 2014
- Fate: Still in Russian hands, as of June 2015
- Badge

Russian Federation
- In service: 2014
- Out of service: 2014
- Home port: Sevastopol

General characteristics
- Class & type: Foxtrot-class submarine
- Displacement: 1,945 tons surfaced; 2,471.5 tons submerged
- Length: 70.1 m (230 ft)
- Propulsion: Diesel-Electric
- Speed: 8.13 kn (15.06 km/h; 9.36 mph) surfaced; 16.05 kn (29.72 km/h; 18.47 mph) submerged
- Range: 30,000 nmi (56,000 km) surfaced (at 8.13 kn (15.06 km/h; 9.36 mph)); 15.3 nautical miles (28.3 km) submerged (at 16.05 kn (29.72 km/h; 18.47 mph))
- Endurance: 575 hours submerged
- Test depth: 250 m (820 ft); 280 m (920 ft) max
- Crew: 78
- Armament: 10 × 533-millimetre (21 in) torpedo tubes, six forward and four stern

Zaporizhzhia (U-01) (Ukrainian: Запоріжжя) is a Project 641 (Foxtrot-class) diesel-electric powered submarine, and was the only submarine of the Ukrainian Navy up until her seizure in March 2014 by Russian forces during 2014 Russian annexation of Crimea. She formerly carried the Soviet Navy pennant number B-435. Zaporizhzhia was designed at the Rubin Design Bureau (Saint Petersburg).

Captured by Russian forces on 22 March 2014 (during the annexation of Crimea), half of the Ukrainian personnel, among them the captain of the submarine, had left while the others chose to begin their service in the Russian Black Sea Fleet with the submarine.

Zaporizhzhia had a crew of 78, commanded by 1st Rank Capt. Oleh Orlov. The submarine was operated by a reserve unit, having not yet returned to front line duty after her 'refurbishment'.

== History ==
Zaporizhzhia's keel was laid down in 1970 at the New Admiralty Shipyard in Leningrad. In 1970 she was commissioned into the Soviet Red Banner Northern Fleet, where she conducted 14 patrols, including a port call in Cuba. In 1990 the submarine was transferred to the Soviet Black Sea Fleet, serving there until 1994. In 1995, the submarine's batteries permanently failed and she was abandoned.

In 1997 unable to fix the unused submarine, the administration of Russian Navy handed it over to the Ukrainian Navy during the partition of the Black Sea Fleet. Like most of the country's naval ships, she was renamed after one of Ukraine's cities – Zaporizhzhia. The city's community began to co-sponsor the ship, especially the accommodation needs of the crew. But it was only in 2003 when Ukrainian government was able to buy a new set of batteries and make Zaporizhzhia's survival real. However, she was immediately placed under repair in Sevastopol.

In 2005, Zaporizhzhia was considered for inclusion in the 2006 joint exercise conducted by the Ukrainian Navy and the Italian Navy, but the end of her repair was postponed. Being on a years-long repair, Zaporizhzhia was an inactive military unit stated Defense Minister Anatoly Hrytsenko in April 2006. In January 2007, (Defense Minister) Hrytsenko stated that Ukraine intended to sell Zaporizhzhia.

As of July 2010 Zaporizhzhia was preparing for trials after repairs. All repairs were finished on 17 April 2011. The first trial sail was finished successfully on 18 July 2012. Late June 2013 all long-term maintenance work and tests were completed.

On 22 March 2014, it was reported that the submarine had been taken over by Russian forces after being surrounded and harassed by Russian Navy ships, who demanded its surrender. Commander Robert Shagieiev (also spelled Shageev) ignored orders to relocate his unit to Odesa by 12 May 2014, instead he declared his intention to serve in the Russian military. Shagieiev was relieved of his duties on 17 May 2014. Shagieiev then signing a contract with the Russian armed forces and assumed the position of deputy commander of the 4th Separate Submarine Brigade of Russia's Black Sea Fleet. Ukraine charged Shagieiev with desertion and treason. The Zaporizhzhia was placed under Black Sea Fleet control, after Ukrainian symbols were removed from the submarine. Half of the submarine's crew continued to serve in the Russian Navy. On 29 March 2014, the Black Sea Fleet was reported to have refused to add the submarine to its ranks on the grounds that it was obsolete and suffered from a number of technical issues. The Russian Navy then offered to return Zaporizhzhia to Ukraine to either continue its service or to be recycled as scrap-metal. It was reported the submarine would be transferred from the Streletskaya buhta to Yuzhnaya buhta, where the Russian submarine division is. Later sources in the Russian Navy announced that submarine should be returned to Ukrainian Navy. Later (it was reported) Russia decided not to return the submarine to Ukraine. But in mid-May the submarine was scheduled to be returned to Ukraine, where it was likely to become a museum piece. A part of the Ukrainian Navy was then returned to Ukraine but Russia suspended this agreement before returning submarine Zaporizhzhia because/after Ukraine did not renew its unilaterally declared ceasefire on 1 July 2014 in the War in Donbas. Hence Zaporizhzhia was not returned to Ukraine. The Russian submarine B-871 "Alrosa" provided crew for the Zaporizhzhia and training for the newly Russian sailors.

As of 29 December 2020, Google Maps imagery showed U-01 afloat and pier-side in Yuzhnaya Bay in Sevastopol surrounded by containment booms, next to Romeo-class submarine S-49.

However, as of 2024, the submarine is no longer present at Sevastopol, and is presumably scrapped.

On 13 August 2026 Robert Shagieiev was believed to have been killed by bomb place in a trash can, which exploded as he walked by.

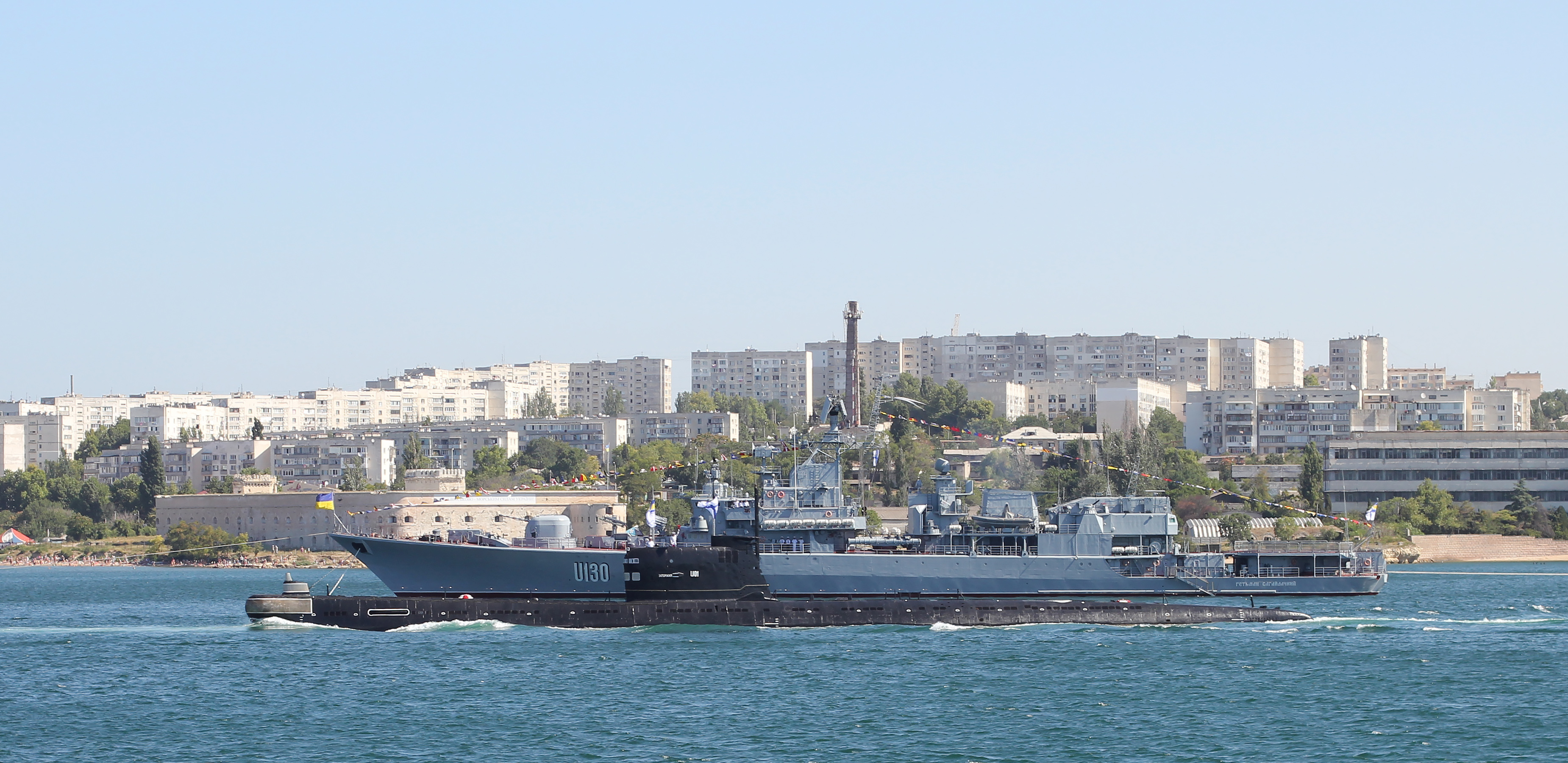
Zaporizhzhia in Sevastopol bay in 2012

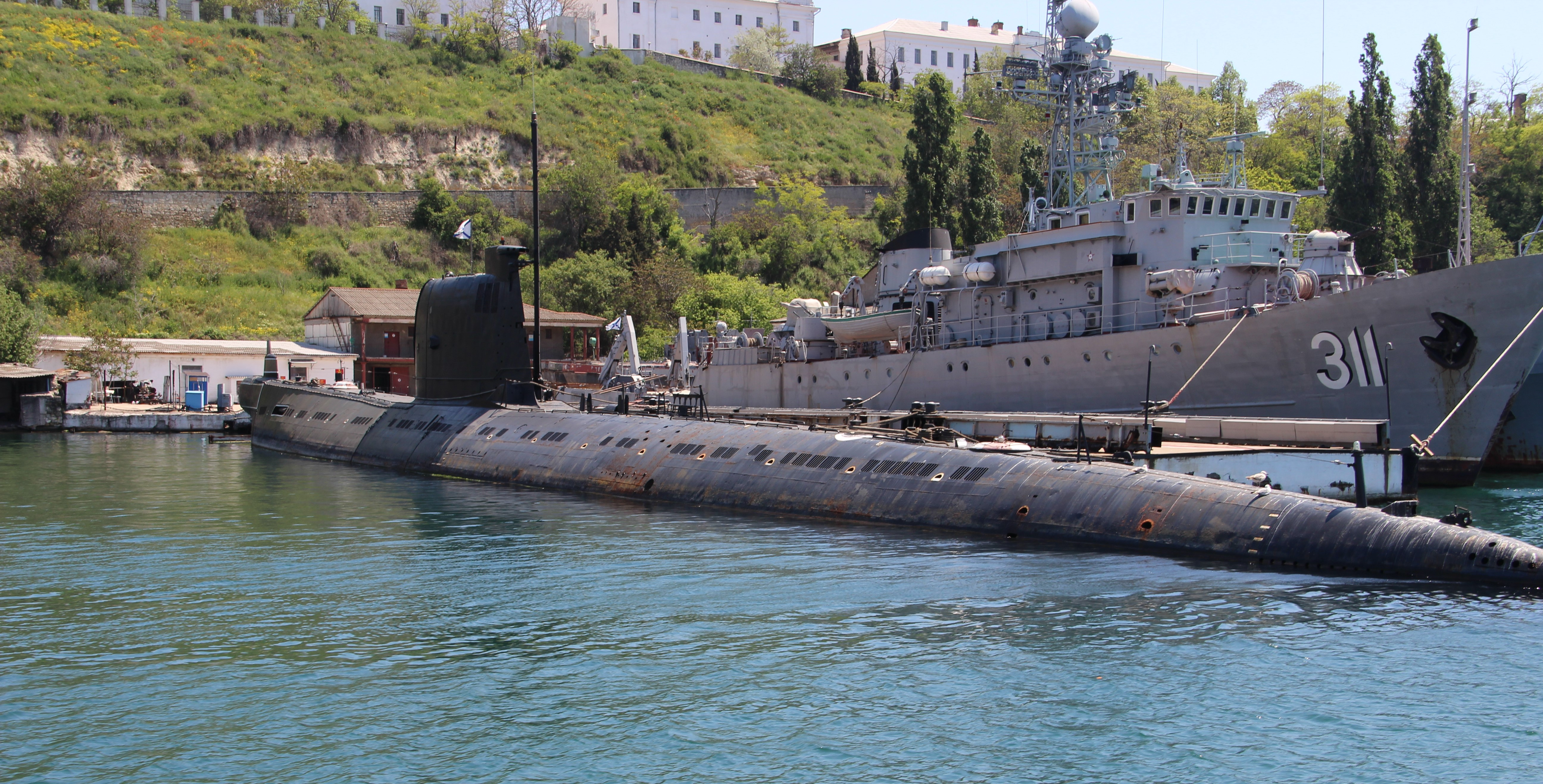
Diesel-electric submarine Zaporizhzhia docked in Sevastopol (2015).

== Ship log ==
From September to November 1970, submarine was at sea for 20 days, 422 hours (236 submerged, 186 surfaced). The vessel traveled 2,672 km (1,660 mi) while surfaced and 695 km (432 mi) while submerged. The submarine completed 15 submerges, and used 125 tons of fuel.

During the service in the Atlantic Ocean in June through December 1971, the submarine was at sea for 210 days. It traveled 29,519 km (18,342 mi) while surfaced and 8,594 km (5,340 mi) while submerged. The submarine completed 71 submerges, and used 825 tons of fuel. During 27 June to 10 August 1972 Zaporizhzhia underwent medium repairs.

From July to October 1994, the submarine was at sea for 16 days. The submarine travelled 391.9 km (243.5 mi) while surfaced and 6.8 km (4.2 mi) while submerged. In January 1995 Zaporizhzhia traveled only 85 km (53 mi) in 4 hours while being towed.

== Armament ==
Main torpedoes used are: 53-51, 53-39, 53-61, 53-65, САЕТ-60.

Torpedo tubes are 533 mm (1.75 ft) diameter, and 8.145 m (26.7 ft) long. Tubes are placed 700 mm (2.3 ft) away from each other.

Also carries 12 extra torpedoes – 22 total.

Can also carry 32 MTD type mines or 26 PM-2 or RM-2 type mines.

Can be equipped with 4 MANPADS.

== See also ==
- Military of Ukraine
