= Soviet submarine B-39 =

Foxtrot-class attack submarine

Coordinates: 32.720738°N 117.174320°W

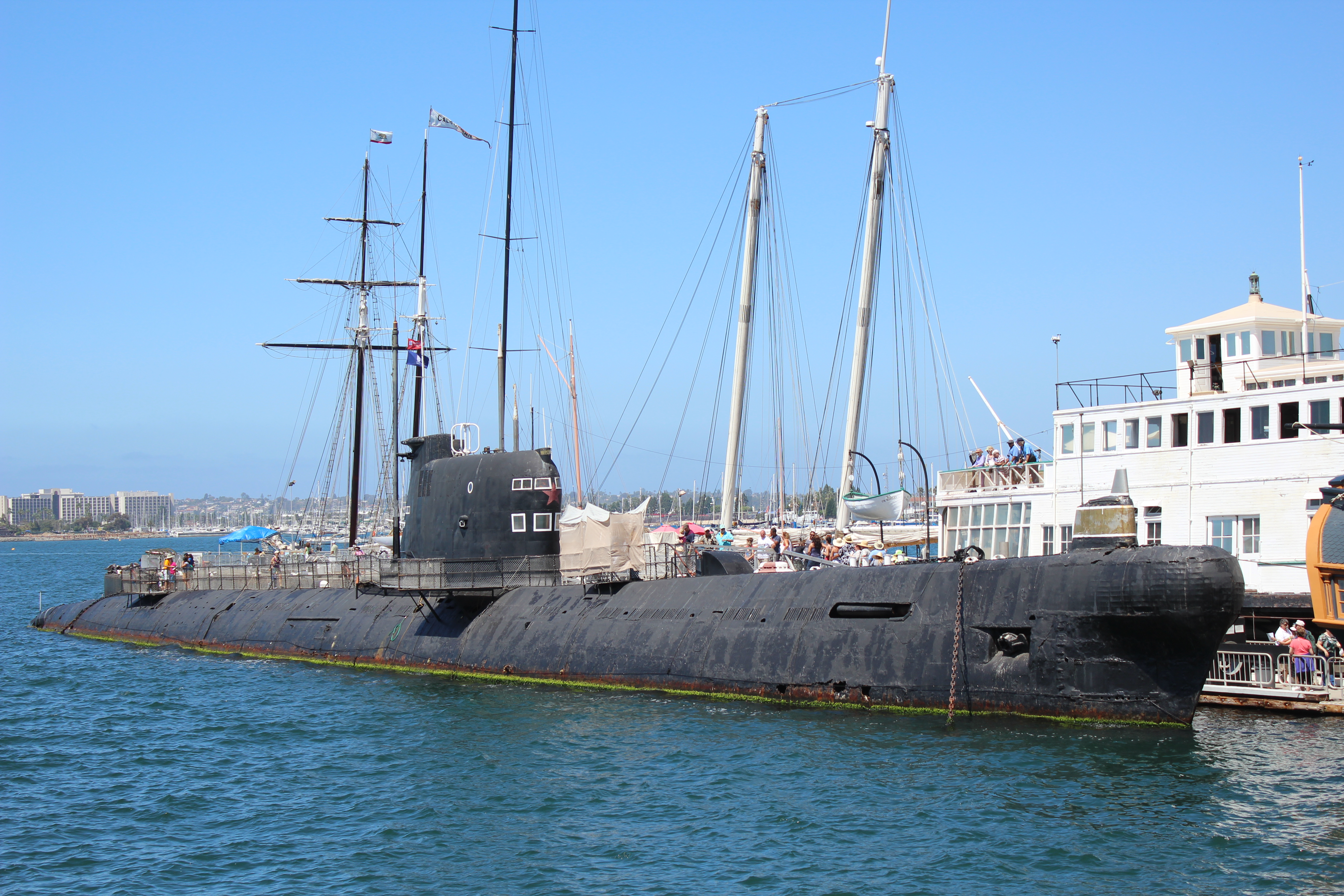
- B-39 in San Diego, California

History

Soviet Union
- Name: Б-39
- Builder: Admiralty Shipyard
- Laid down: 9 February 1962
- Launched: 15 April 1967
- Commissioned: 28 December 1967
- Decommissioned: 1 April 1994
- Home port: Vladivostok
- Fate: Scrapped in 2022

General characteristics
- Class & type: Foxtrot-class submarine
- Displacement: 1,953 long tons (1,984 t) surfaced; 2,475 long tons (2,515 t) submerged
- Length: 89.9 m (294 ft 11 in)
- Beam: 7.4 m (24 ft 3 in)
- Draft: 5.9 m (19 ft 4 in)
- Propulsion: 3 × Kolomna 2D42M 2,000 hp (1,500 kW) diesel engines; 3 electric motors; 2 × 1,350 hp (1,007 kW) and 1 × 2,700 hp (2,000 kW); 1 × 180 hp (130 kW) auxiliary motor; 3 shafts, each with 6-bladed propellers
- Speed: 16 knots (18 mph; 30 km/h) surfaced; 15 knots (17 mph; 28 km/h) submerged; 9 knots (10 mph; 17 km/h) snorkeling
- Range: 20,000 nmi (37,000 km) at 8 kn (9.2 mph; 15 km/h) surfaced; 11,000 nmi (20,000 km) snorkeling; 380 nmi (700 km) at 2 kn (2.3 mph; 3.7 km/h) submerged
- Endurance: 3–5 days submerged
- Test depth: 246–296 m (807–971 ft)
- Complement: 12 officers, 10 warrants, 56 seamen
- Armament: 10 torpedo tubes (6 bow, 4 stern); Up to 22 torpedoes

B-39 was a Project 641 (Foxtrot-class) diesel-electric attack submarine of the Soviet Navy. The "B" (actually "Б") in her designation stands for большая (bolshaya, "large")—Foxtrots were the Soviet Navy's largest non-nuclear submarines.

B-39 was culled from a group of ex-Soviet diesel electric submarines in Vladivostok, and eventually sold to a group of western businessmen. In 2002, the B-39 was put on display in Seattle, Washington in Elliot Bay along Pier 48. On April 21, 2005, B-39 became a museum ship on display at the Maritime Museum of San Diego, California, United States, encountering harsh winds and storms on its journey. In October 2021 the decision was made to withdraw the deteriorating submarine from the collection and scrap her. She departed the Maritime Museum of San Diego on February 7, 2022, for Ensenada, Mexico to be scrapped.

== History ==
=== Service history ===
Her keel was laid down on 9 February 1962 at the Admiralty Shipyard in Leningrad (now known as Saint Petersburg). She was launched on 15 April 1967 and commissioned on 28 December 1967.

Transferred to the 9th Submarine Squadron of the Pacific Fleet, B-39 was homeported in Vladivostok. She conducted patrols and stalked U.S. warships throughout the North Pacific, along the coast of the United States and Canada, and ranging as far as the Indian Ocean and the Arctic Ocean. After the end of the Vietnam War, she often made port visits to Danang. During the early 1970s, B-39 trailed a Canadian frigate through Strait of Juan de Fuca to Vancouver Island.

In 1989, in the Sea of Japan while charging batteries on the surface, B-39 came within 500 yards (460 m; 0.25 nmi) of an Oliver Hazard Perry-class frigate of the US Navy. Both crews took pictures of each other.

=== Post-USSR history ===
B-39 was decommissioned on 1 April 1994 and sold to Finland. She made her way from there through a series of sales to Vancouver Island in 1996 and to Seattle, Washington, in 2002 before arriving in San Diego, California, on 22 April 2005 and becoming an exhibit of the Maritime Museum of San Diego. During her sequence of owners she acquired the names "Black Widow" and "Cobra", neither of which she had during her commissioned career.

When B-39 was made a museum, the shroud around her attack periscope was cut away where it passes through her control room. As built, a Foxtrot's periscopes are only accessible from her conning tower, which is off-limits in the museum. With the shroud cut away, tourists could look through the partially raised periscope (which is directed toward the USS Midway museum, some 500 yards (460 m; 1,500 ft) away). However, the unidentified and unexplained change gave the false impression that one periscope could be used from the control room.

In 2000, while stored in Vancouver, B-39 was used as a stage for scenes in the Stargate SG-1 episode "Small Victories" (S04E01).

In 2010, B-39 was proposed to be sunk to create an offshore diving reef, but an outcry from teachers and enthusiasts ensured the sub would stay on display a while longer.

In 2012, B-39 was a stage for the film Phantom (2013).

During the 2010s, B-39 had become badly rusted with large holes visible in the outer hull and upper deck. In October 2021, the Museum decided to withdraw the submarine from its collection. On February 7, 2022, she headed out to Ensenada, Mexico, to be scrapped.

== See also ==
- B-427, a Foxtrot on display in Long Beach, California
- Submarine U-475 "Black Widow", a Foxtrot class awaiting restoration on the River Medway, England
