= Soviet submarine B-427 =

Soviet submarine renamed Scorpion after being decommissioned

Coordinates: 33.753283°N 118.191399°W

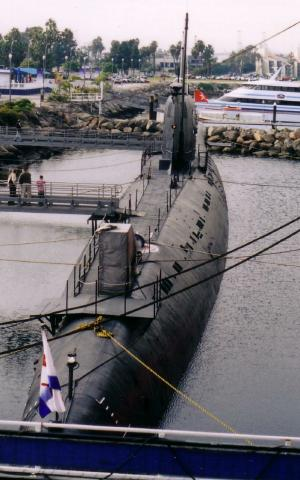
- B-427, on display in Long Beach, California

History

Soviet Union
- Name: Б-427
- Laid down: 10 April 1971
- Launched: 22 June 1971
- Commissioned: 4 December 1971
- Decommissioned: 1994
- Stricken: 1994
- Status: Museum ship; shut down as of 2015

General characteristics
- Class & type: Foxtrot-class submarine
- Displacement: 1,952 long tons (1,983 t) surfaced; 2,475 long tons (2,515 t) submerged
- Length: 299 ft 6 in (91.29 m)
- Beam: 24 ft 7 in (7.49 m)
- Draft: 20 ft (6.1 m)
- Propulsion: 3 × Kolomna 2D42M 2,000 hp (1,491 kW) diesel engines; 3 electric motors; 2 × 1,350 hp (1,007 kW) and 1 × 2,700 hp (2,013 kW); 1 × 140 hp (104 kW) auxiliary motor; 3 shafts, each with 6-bladed propellers
- Speed: 16 knots (30 km/h; 18 mph) surfaced; 15 knots (28 km/h; 17 mph) submerged; 8 knots (15 km/h; 9.2 mph) snorkeling
- Range: 20,000 nmi (37,000 km; 23,000 mi) at 8 kn (15 km/h; 9.2 mph) surfaced; 11,000 nmi (20,000 km; 13,000 mi) snorkeling; 380 nmi (700 km; 440 mi) at 2 kn (3.7 km/h; 2.3 mph) submerged
- Endurance: 3–5 days submerged
- Test depth: 270–280 m (890–920 ft)
- Complement: 12 officers, 10 warrants, 56 seamen
- Armament: 10 × 21 in (533 mm) torpedo tubes (6 bow, 4 stern); Up to 22 torpedoes

B-427 is a Project 641 (Foxtrot-class) diesel-electric attack submarine of the Soviet Navy. The "B" (actually "Б") in her designation stands for большая (bolshaya, "large"). Commissioned in 1971, the submarine operated with the Russian Pacific Fleet until decommissioning in 1994.

The boat was sold to a group of Australian businessmen, who converted her into a museum vessel, which was placed on display at the Australian National Maritime Museum (under the name Foxtrot-540) from 1995 until 1998, then at Long Beach, California, (under the name Podvodnaya Lodka B-427 Scorpion) in 1998.

The submarine fell into disrepair and has been closed to the public since 2015.

== Decommissioning and preservation ==
The submarine was decommissioned by the Russian Navy in December 1994. She was one of the last three Foxtrot-class submarines to serve in the Russian Pacific Fleet. The boat was acquired by a group of Australian businessmen on a three-year lease purchase contract, and was towed from Vladivostok on 25 July 1995. En route to Sydney, the tow company claimed that the deal for the Russian Navy to cover the cost of the tow was invalid, and claimed that A$150,000 in towing expenses was required. The submarine arrived in Sydney on 31 August, and after some modifications, was loaned to the Australian National Maritime Museum for display as a museum vessel under the designation "Foxtrot-540" (the submarine's last pennant number while in service). As the submarine was still the property of the Russian Navy for the duration of the lease, an Australian ex-submariner was commissioned into the Russian Navy to command and look after Foxtrot-540, with the boat's former engineering officer assisting. The submarine was in near-operational condition; the diesel generators and electrical storage system, ballast tanks, and hotel load equipment were functional, and Russian personnel travelled to Australia to teach museum staff about maintenance and operation of the boat. Foxtrot-540 spent three years berthed at the museum, attracting over 700,000 visitors during this period (including intelligence analysts from multiple nations during the first weeks on display).

In May 1998, the submarine was loaded onto a heavy lift ship and relocated to Long Beach, California. On arrival, she was berthed next to RMS Queen Mary and opened to the public on 14 July under the designation "Podvodnaya Lodka B-427 Scorpion". On 19 April 2011, the company operating Queen Mary (Delaware North) announced that they had acquired Scorpion and were planning to increase attendance at both attractions through combined ticketing and joint marketing campaigns. Urban Commons took over the lease of the Queen Mary and the Scorpion in April 2016. The Scorpion Submarine is owned by NEWCO Pty Ltd and is on a long-term lease to Urban Commons.

== Museum closure ==
In November 2012, the vessel was discovered to have flooding and as a result was listing 24 degrees to starboard. It was closed to the public in 2015, by which time the pressure hull had ruptured and raccoons had taken up residence on board. By 2021, when control of the Queen Mary returned to Long Beach, the city was attempting to have the submarine removed.

== See also ==
- Soviet submarine B-39, a Foxtrot formerly on display in San Diego, California
