= ORP Wilk (292) =

Polish Submarine in service 1987-2003

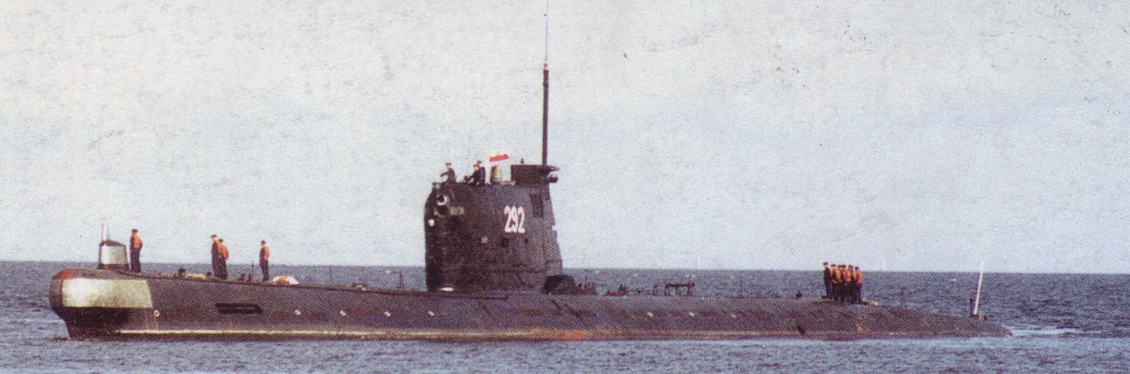
ORP Wilk

ORP Wilk was a Foxtrot-class submarine, in service with the Polish Navy from 1987 to 2003. It was originally commissioned into the Soviet Navy in 1963. The boat travelled 47000 nautical miles and dived 626 times.
