= Submarine U-475 Black Widow =

1966 Foxtrot-class submarine

Coordinates: 51°23′43.7″N 0°30′12.9″E

U-475 Black Widow
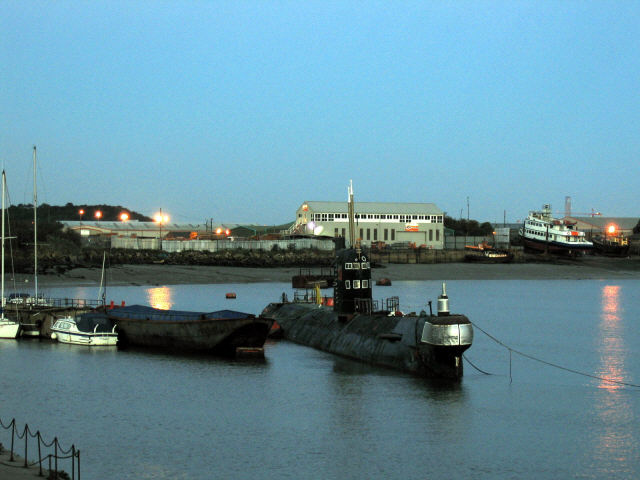
- Soviet Foxtrot-class submarine in 2005

History

Soviet Union
- Laid down: 12 October 1966
- Launched: 24 December 1966
- Commissioned: 30 June 1967
- Decommissioned: 30 June 1993
- Status: Dilapidated state; moored on the River Medway near the city of Rochester

General characteristics
- Class & type: Foxtrot-class submarine
- Displacement: 1950 t
- Length: 92 m (302 ft)
- Beam: 7.5 m (25 ft)
- Draft: 5.1 m (17 ft)
- Propulsion: 3 × 2,000 hp (1,500 kW) diesel engines; 3 electric motors; 2 × 1,350 hp (1,010 kW) and 1 × 2,700 hp (2,000 kW); 1 × 140 hp (100 kW) auxiliary motor
- Speed: 16.8 kn (31.1 km/h; 19.3 mph) surfaced
- Range: 20,000 nmi (37,000 km) at 8 kn (15 km/h) surfaced; 11,000 nmi (20,000 km) snorkeling; 380 nmi (700 km) at 2 kn (3.7 km/h) submerged
- Endurance: 3–5 days submerged
- Test depth: 250–280 m (820–920 ft)
- Complement: 77
- Armament: 10 torpedo tubes (6 bow, 4 stern); Up to 22 torpedoes

Submarine U-475 Black Widow is a Soviet Navy Foxtrot-class submarine. It is currently moored at Strood, on the River Medway, in South-East England, awaiting restoration.

== Background ==
The Soviet Project 641 class submarines (known to the West by their NATO reporting name of Foxtrot) was a class of conventionally powered patrol/attack submarines. Some 74 were built by the Soviet Navy between 1957 and 1983 as well as 17 others for the Libyan, Cuban and Indian navies.

== Service history ==
Black Widow was built at Sudomekh shipyard in Leningrad and commissioned in 1967. It was based at Riga and served with the Soviet Baltic Fleet before being used as a training vessel for crews from overseas who would be operating Foxtrot-class subs in their own navies. It was decommissioned in 1993 and sold.

== Museum ship ==
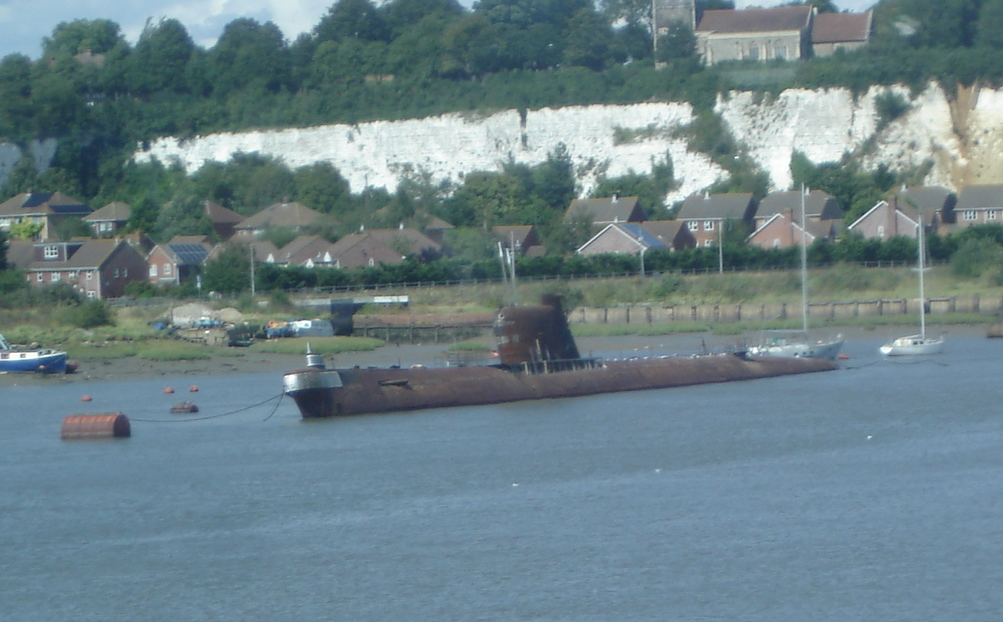
The submarine in 2014

After passing into private hands, and under the name U-475 Black Widow it was moored at Long's Wharf near the Thames Barrier in England where it was open to the public as a museum ship. In 1998 it was moved to Folkestone, where it was again opened to the public. In 2004 it was moved to her present location, in a state of disrepair, and is currently awaiting restoration.

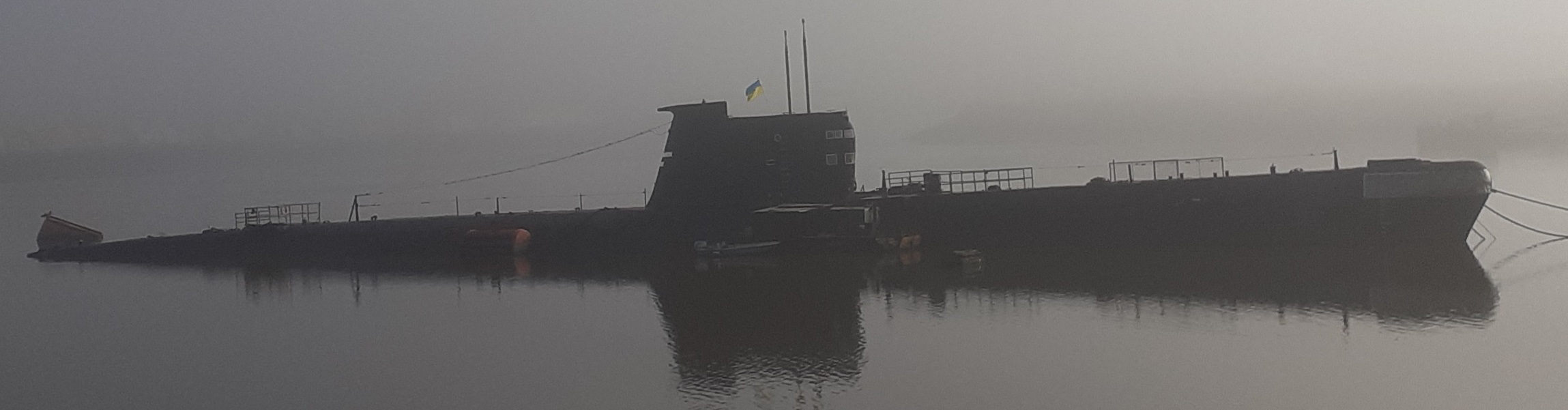
U-475 Black Widow with the Ukrainian national flag

After the invasion of Ukraine by the Russian Federation, U-475 began to fly the Ukrainian national flag as a sign of clear support for Ukraine in the conflict.

== Naming ==
The submarine is currently referred to as Foxtrot B-39 U-475 Black Widow. The B- designation stands for Bolshaya (Large), and was used by the Soviet Navy during the Cold War era. The B-39 designation also suggests a vessel in the Soviet Pacific Fleet; Baltic Fleet vessels carried numbers in the 200s. The name Black Widow and the designation U-475 were invented for the boat by the new owners. Soviet submarines were not generally named, the U- designation was not used by the Soviets, and none of the Foxtrots known carried the number -475.

In Soviet service it was actually known as B-49 and served in the Northern Fleet until November 1974 when it was reassigned to the Baltic.
