= Foxtrot-class submarine =

Class of Soviet diesel-electric patrol submarines

Foxtrot class

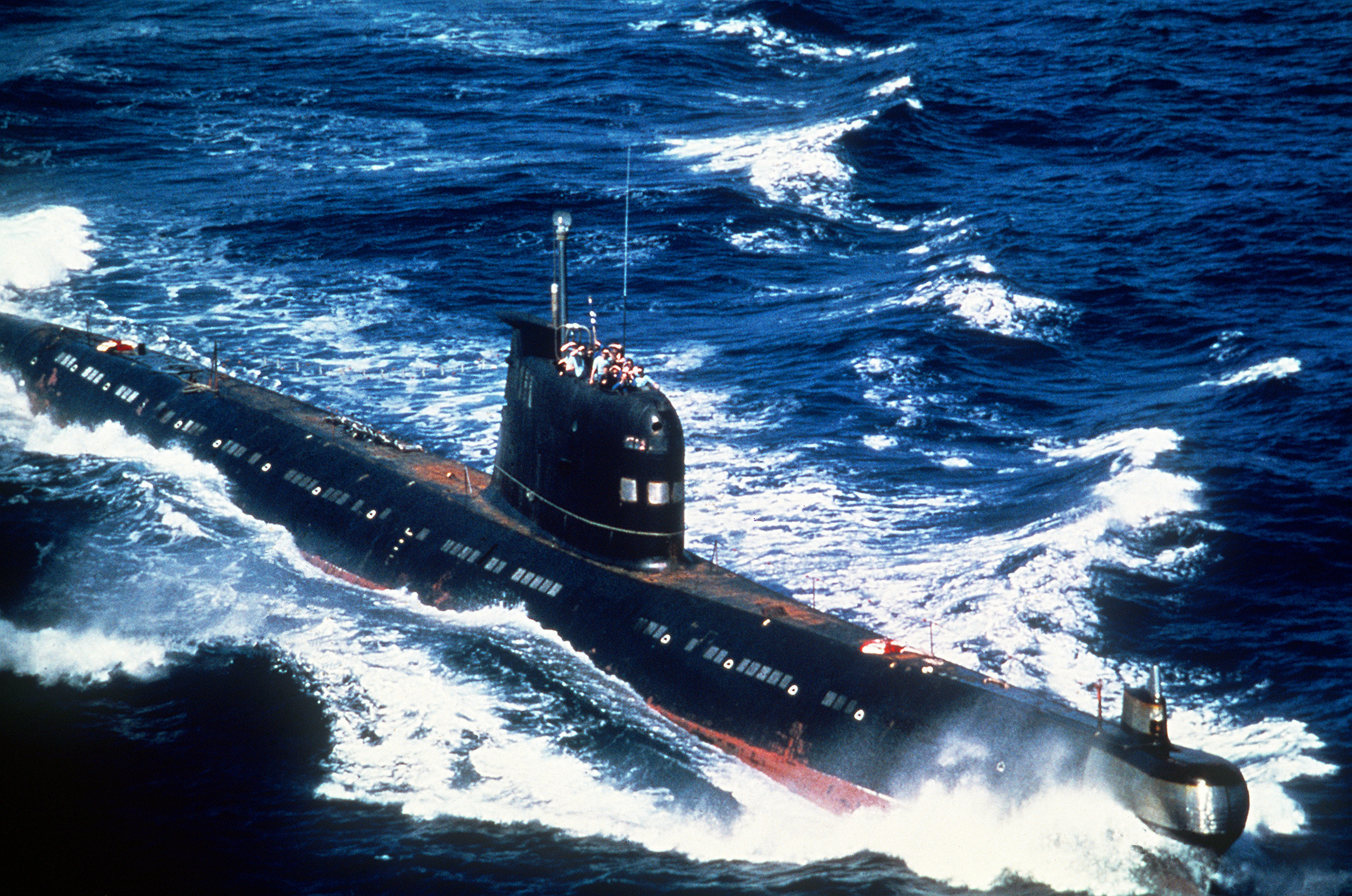
- A Cuban Foxtrot underway

Class overview
- Builders: Sudomekh, Leningrad
- Operators: Soviet Navy / Russian Navy; Libyan Navy; Cuban Revolutionary Navy; Indian Navy; Polish Navy; Ukrainian Navy
- Preceded by: Zulu-class submarine; Romeo-class submarine
- Succeeded by: Tango-class submarine
- Subclasses: Kalvari class; Vela class
- Built: 1957–1983
- In service: 1958–2014
- In commission: 1958–2014
- Completed: 75
- Lost: 1
- Preserved: 7

General characteristics
- Type: Submarine
- Displacement: 1,952 long tons (1,983 t) surfaced; 2,475 long tons (2,515 t) submerged
- Length: 89.9 m (294 ft 11 in)
- Beam: 7.4 m (24 ft 3 in)
- Draft: 5.9 m (19 ft 4 in)
- Propulsion: 3 × Kolomna 2D42M 2,000 hp (1,500 kW) diesel engines; 3 × Electric motors, two 1,350 hp (1,010 kW) and one 2,700 hp (2,000 kW); 1 × 180 hp (130 kW) auxiliary motor; 3 shafts, each with 6-bladed propellers
- Speed: 16 knots (30 km/h) surfaced; 15 knots (28 km/h) submerged; 9 knots (17 km/h) snorkeling
- Range: 20,000 nmi (37,000 km) at 8 kn (15 km/h) surfaced; 11,000 nmi (20,000 km) snorkeling; 380 nmi (700 km) at 2 kn (3.7 km/h) submerged
- Endurance: 3-5 days submerged
- Test depth: 246–296 m (807–971 ft)
- Complement: 12 officers, 10 warrants, 56 seamen
- Armament: 10 × torpedo tubes (6 bow, 4 stern); 22 torpedoes

The Foxtrot class was the NATO reporting name of a class of diesel-electric patrol submarines that were built in the Soviet Union. The Soviet designation of this class was Project 641. The Foxtrot class was designed to replace the earlier Zulu class, which suffered from structural weaknesses and harmonic vibration problems that limited its operational depth and submerged speed. The first Foxtrot keel was laid down in 1957 and commissioned in 1958 and the last was completed in 1983. A total of 58 were built for the Soviet Navy at the Sudomekh division of the Admiralty Shipyard (now Admiralty Wharves), Saint Petersburg. Additional hulls were built for other countries.

The Foxtrot class was comparable in performance and armament to most contemporary designs. However, its three screws made it noisier than most Western designs. Moreover, the Foxtrot class was one of the last designs introduced before the adoption of the teardrop hull, which offered much better underwater performance. Also, although the Foxtrot was larger than a Zulu class submarine, the Foxtrot class had 2 of its 3 decks dedicated to batteries. This gave it an underwater endurance of 10 days, but the weight of the batteries made the Foxtrot's average speed a slow 2 knots (3.7 km/h) at its maximum submerged time capability. Onboard conditions were crowded, with space being relatively small even when compared to older submarines such as the much older American Balao-class submarine.

The Foxtrot class was obsolete by the time the last submarine was launched. The Russian Navy retired its last Foxtrots between 1995 and 2000; units were scrapped and disposed of for museum purposes.

== Operational History ==
=== Cuban Missile Crisis ===
Project 641s played a central role in some of the most dramatic incidents of the Cuban Missile Crisis. The Soviet Navy deployed four Project 641 submarines to Cuba: B-4, B-36, B-59, and B-130 of the Soviet Sixty-Ninth Submarine Brigade. US Navy destroyers dropped practice depth charges near Project 641 subs near Cuba in efforts to force them to surface and be identified. Three of the four Project 641 submarines were forced to surface, however one eluded US forces. All four boats were later ordered to return to port in Russia.

=== Annexation of Crimea ===
During the division of the Soviet Black Sea Fleet, in 1997 one Foxtrot class submarine (later renamed as Zaporizhzhia) was passed to Ukraine as it was not operational since 1991. The ship never effectively served in the Ukrainian Navy and was under repair. In 2005 Ukrainian Ministry of Defence wanted to sell it, but was unsuccessful. Following successful post-repair trials in June 2013, it was recognised as operational. However, on 22 March 2014 it was surrendered to or captured by Russia as part of the Russian annexation of Crimea. Russia decided not to accept it due to its age and operational unsuitability. Its subsequent status is unknown.

== Units ==
Following is a list of 58 of the 75 Foxtrot-class submarines built during the Soviet Project 641, at Yard 196, Leningrad.

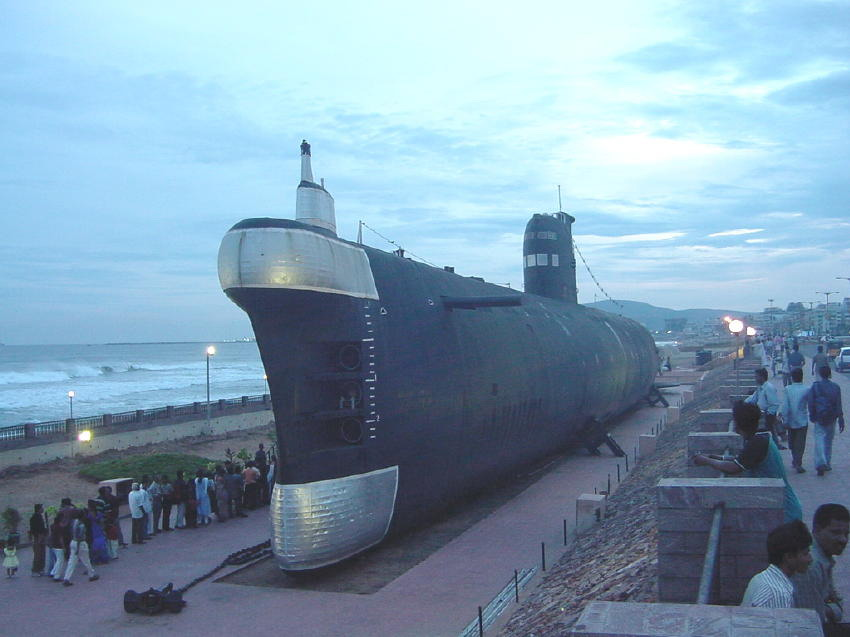
A museum ship, INS Kursura (S20).

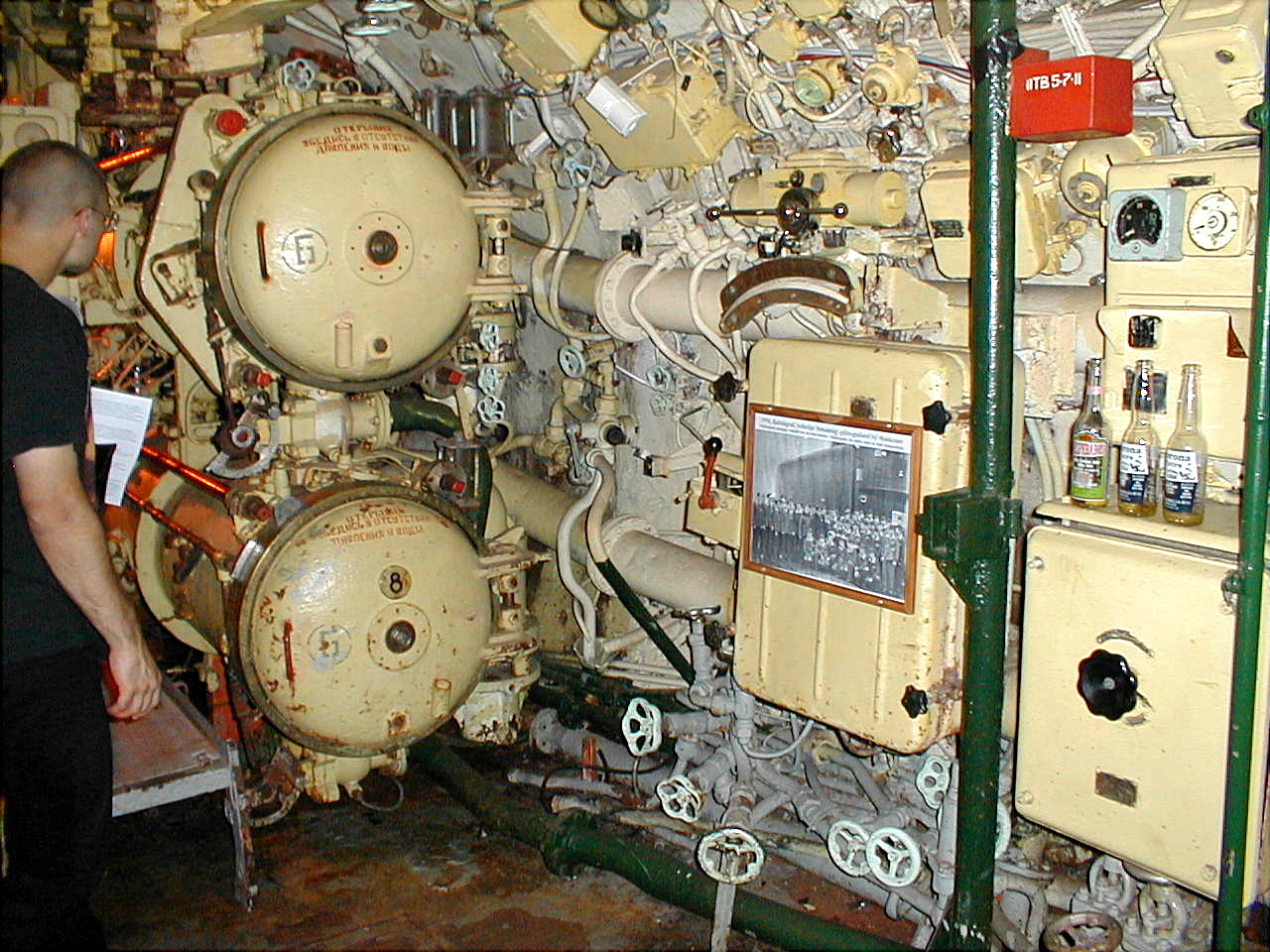
Inside the aft torpedo room.

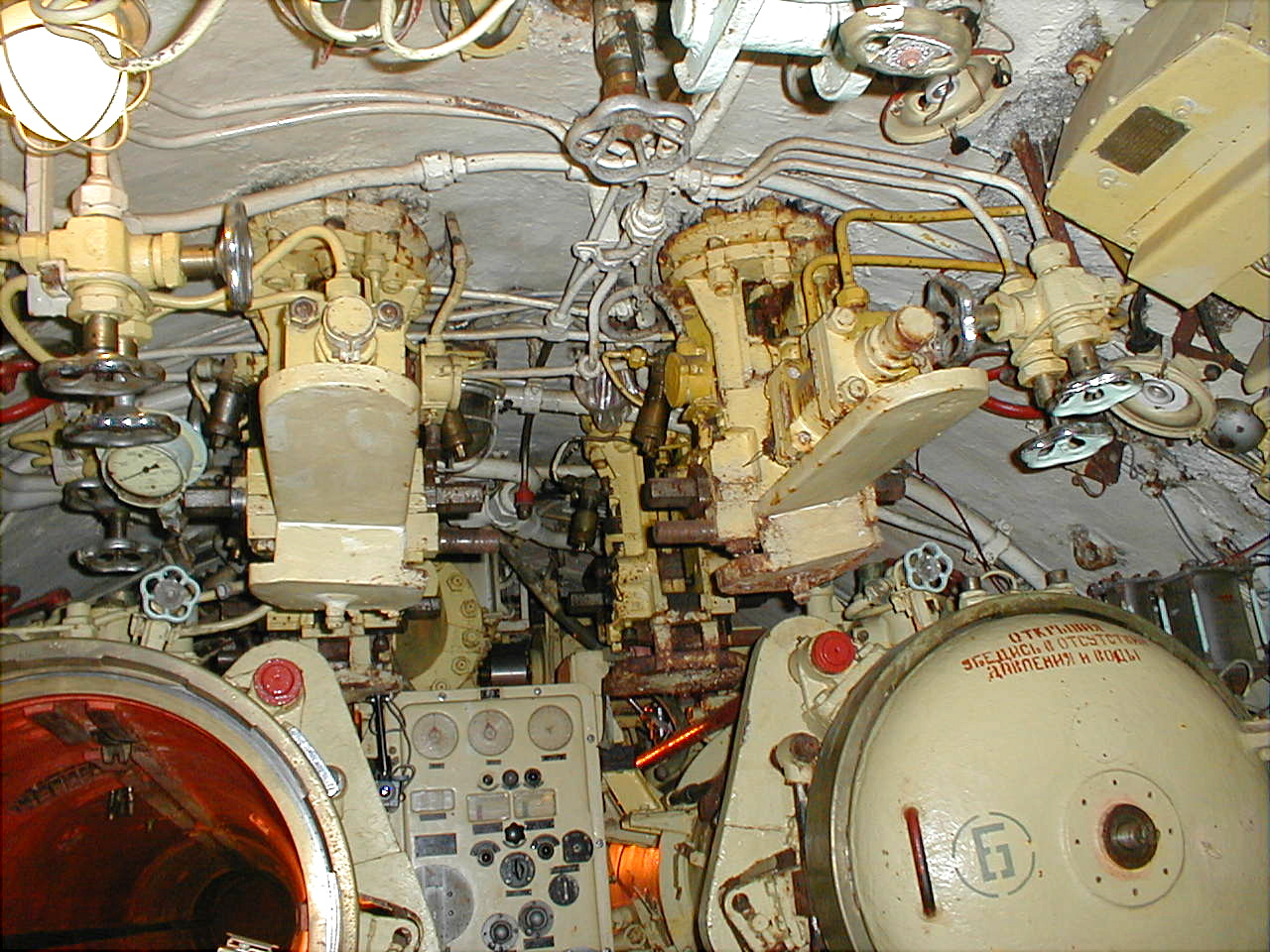
Aft torpedo room of a Foxtrot museum ship.

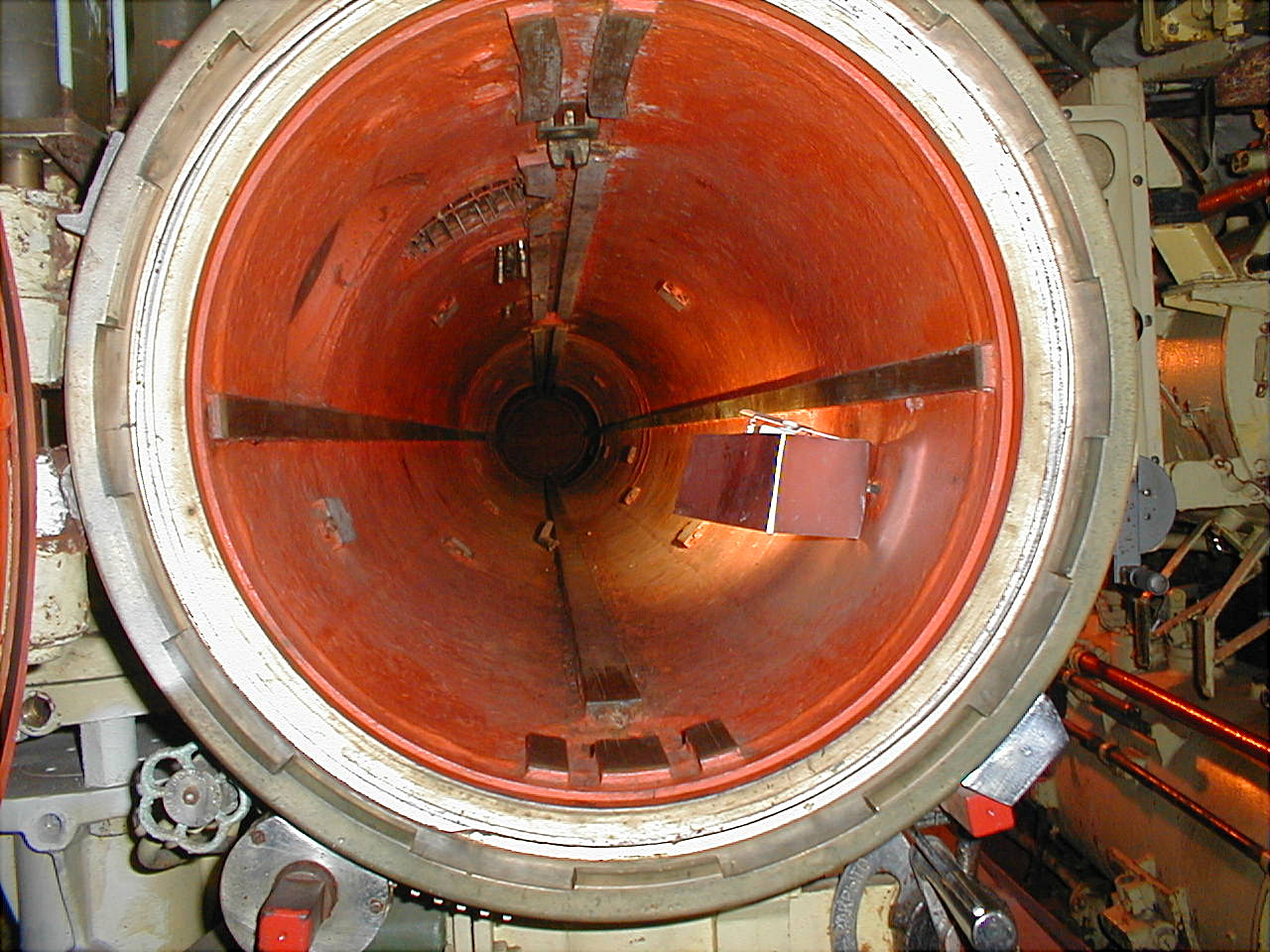
Opened torpedo tube in a Foxtrot

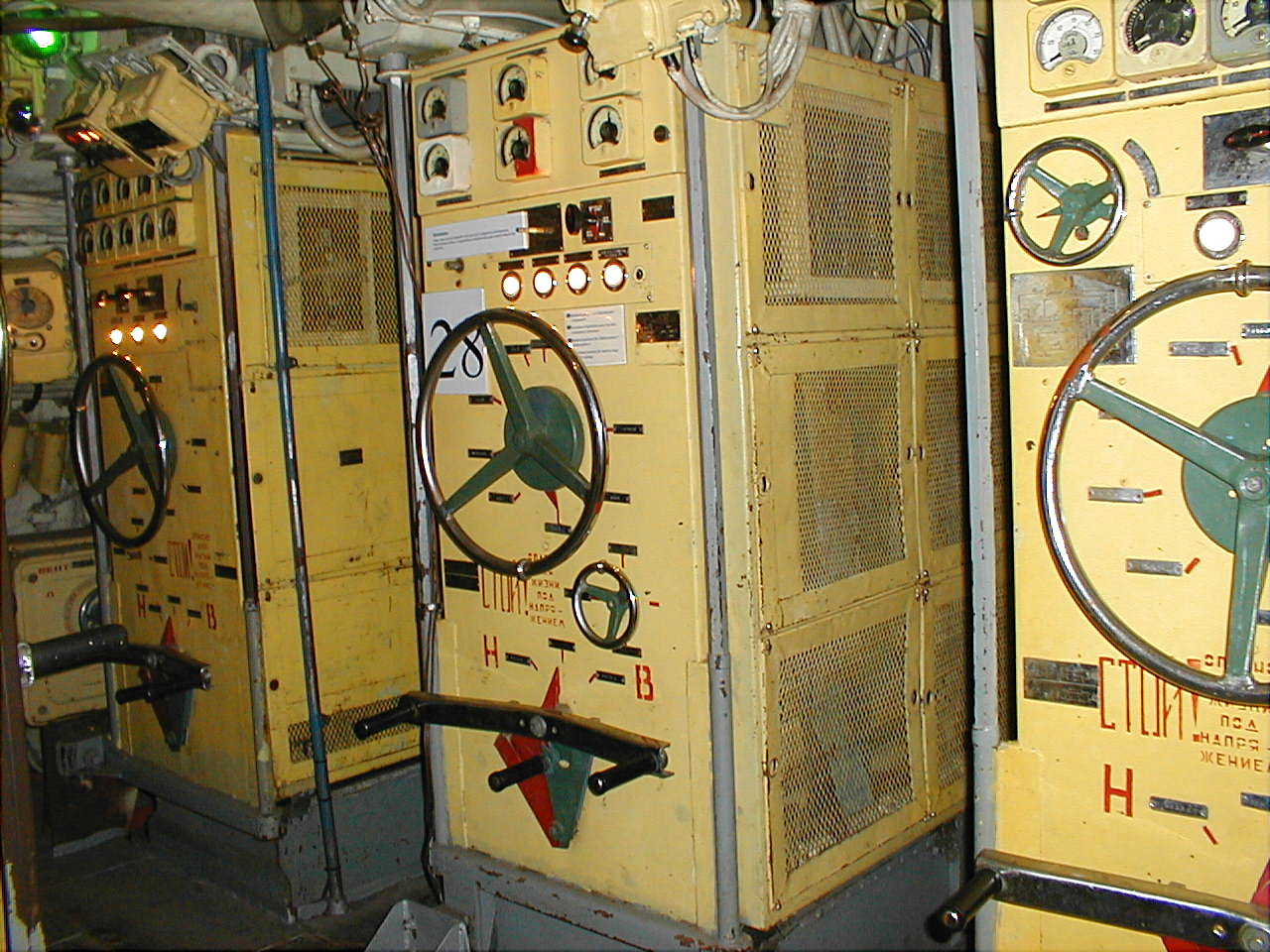
Electric generator/motor controls

Project 641 (NATO: Foxtrot Class)
Number	Laid down	Launched	Decommissioned	Status
B-94	3 October 1957	28 December 1957	1 October 1984	Decommissioned for scrapping
B-95	2 February 1958	25 April 1958	22 February 1980	Decommissioned for scrapping
B-36	29 April 1958	31 August 1958	24 August 1993	Decommissioned for scrapping
B-37	18 July 1958	5 November 1958	11 January 1962	Sank after fire and multiple explosions
B-133	27 September 1958	26 January 1959	1 October 1983	Renamed B-833
B-135	20 December 1958	30 March 1959	1 July 1977	-
B-139	25 February 1959	30 May 1959	1 October 1976	Renamed B-839
B-116	9 June 1959	10 October 1959	28 September 1994	-
B-130	22 August 1959	17 December 1959	1 October 1988	-
B-85	23 December 1959	19 March 1960	19 April 1990	-
B-59	21 February 1960	6 June 1960	19 April 1990	-
B-156	20 April 1960	2 August 1960	19 April 1991	-
B-153	6 August 1960	31 January 1961	24 June 1991	Renamed B-854
B-164	26 October 1960	2 August 1960	3 July 1992	-
B-33	3 February 1961	27 April 1961	24 June 1991	-
B-105	1 July 1961	1 October 1961	24 August 1993	-
B-169	17 August 1961	29 November 1961	19 April 1990	-
B-38	30 October 1961	31 January 1962	25 April 1989	-
B-53	8 January 1962	12 April 1962	19 April 1990	renamed B-853
B-50	7 March 1962	15 June 1962	3 July 1992	-
B-8	9 May 1962	21 July 1962	19 April 1990	-
B-31	18 August 1962	3 November 1962	24 June 1991	-
B-2	27 October 1962	25 January 1963	24 June 1991	-
B-55	22 January 1963	5 April 1963	3 July 1992	renamed B-855
B-98	4 April 1963	15 June 1963	2001	Renamed 292 Wilk
B-101	19 June 1963	30 August 1963	30 June 1993	-
B-6	9 August 1963	30 November 1963	24 August 1994	-
B-103	14 December 1963	16 April 1964	24 June 1991	-
B-109	22 February 1964	17 June 1964	28 September 1997	-
B-107	18 April 1964	25 July 1964	4 August 1995	renamed B-807
B-112	19 June 1964	27 October 1964	19 April 1990	-
B-25	26 August 1964	22 December 1964	3 July 1992	-
B-205	17 June 1969	29 August 1969	31 January 1996	-
B-143	21 October 1959	17 February 1960	24 June 1991	ex-Seafront Zeebrugge Museum, Belgium. 2019 towed away for scrapping in Ghent.
B-15	10 October 1963	21 February 1964	29 October 1992	-
B-427	10 April 1971	22 June 1971	28 April 1994	Formerly a Museum, Long Beach, California, USA
B-39	9 February 1967	15 April 1967	5 July 1994	Formerly a Museum, San Diego, California, USA Sold for scrap 2022
B-440	1 June 1970	16 September 1970	1999	Museum, Vytegra, Russia
B-435	24 March 1970	29 May 1970	Unknown	As U-01 "Zaporizhiya" in Ukraine
B-9	26 December 1964	31 March 1965	17 July 1997	-
B-4	14 June 1960	3 October 1960	24 June 1991	-
B-57	23 April 1959	15 August 1959	24 June 1991	-
B-7	14 April 1961	29 June 1961	19 April 1990	-
B-21	29 October 1964	16 February 1965	3 July 1995	
B-26	6 May 1965	10 August 1965	24 June 1991	-
B-28	24 May 1965	10 August 1965	30 June 1993	-
B-34	13 August 1965	16 November 1965	24 June 1991	-
B-40	24 September 1965	16 November 1965	30 June 1993	-
B-29	25 March 1966	20 May 1966	2003	1988 Renamed 293 Dzik
B-41	7 April 1966	20 May 1966	24 August 1993	-
B-46	13 August 1966	24 December 1966	30 June 1993	-
B-49	12 October 1966	24 December 1966	31 December 1993	As "Foxtrot B-39 U-475 Black Widow", former museum awaiting restoration on the River Medway near Rochester, Kent, England
B-397	7 May 1967	22 August 1967	30 June 1993	-
B-400	29 May 1967	22 August 1967	24 September 1991	-
B-413	28 June 1968	7 October 1968	1999	Museum, Kaliningrad, Russia
B-416	18 July 1968	25 February 1969	3 July 1992	-
B-213	1 October 1969	20 January 1970	30 June 1993	-
B-409	18 December 1970	2 March 1971	30 June 1993	-

== Operators ==
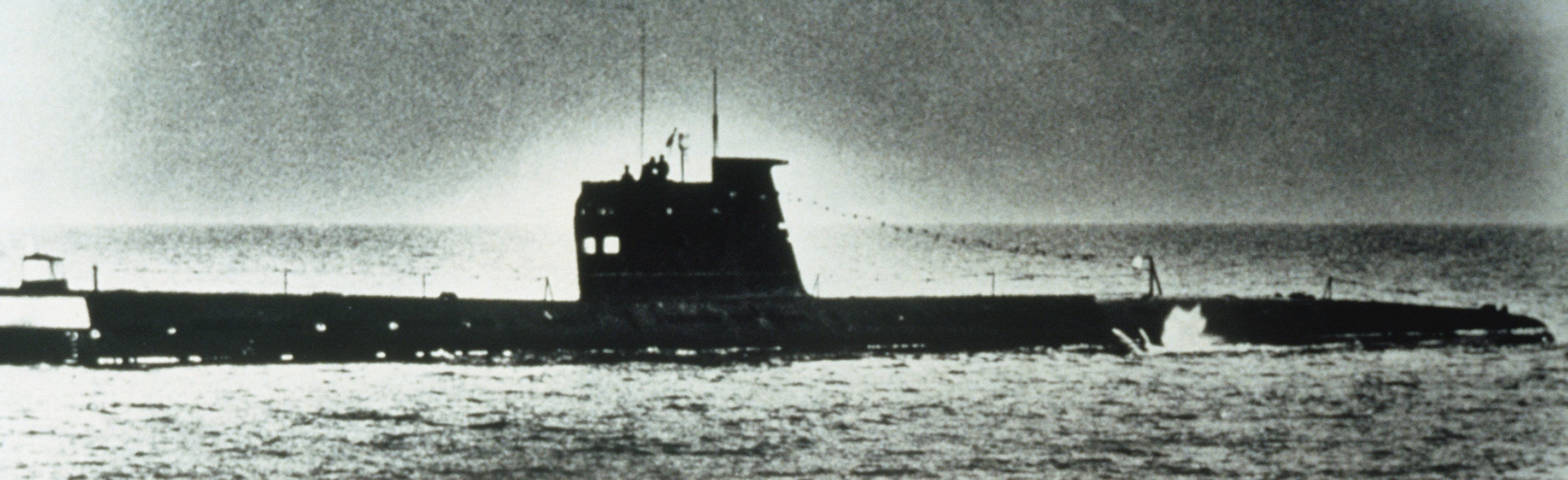
A Libyan foxtrot

Most saw service in the Soviet Navy. Foxtrots were also built for the Indian Navy (eight units, from 1967 to 1974), Libyan (six units, from 1978 to 1980), and Cuban (six units, from 1978 to 1983) navies. Some Soviet Foxtrots later saw service in the Polish and Ukrainian navies.

- Soviet Union
  - Soviet Navy (passed on to successor states)
- Russia
  - Russian Navy
- India
  - Indian Navy – Variants known as the Kalvari class, and Vela class, now decommissioned (INS Kursura converted into a museum)
- Libya
  - Libyan Navy – 6 units (2 left but probably abandoned)
- Cuba
  - Cuban Revolutionary Navy – three units (hull numbers 309, 510 and 586, incidentally this one was the last "Foxtrot" built)
- Poland
  - Polish Navy – 2 units (ex–Soviet Navy), ORP Wilk (1987–2003) and ORP Dzik (1988–2003)
- Ukraine
  - Ukrainian Navy – 1 unit (Zaporizhzhia), has been taken over by Russian forces during the 2014 annexation of Crimea.

== On display ==
Several Foxtrots are on display as museums around the world, including:

- B-413 at Kaliningrad, Russia.
- B-427 at the RMS Queen Mary in Long Beach, California, United States.
- B-440 at Vytegra, a port on the Volga–Baltic Waterway in Russia.
- U-475 Black Widow at Strood, Kent, United Kingdom
- Indian Foxtrot submarine INS Kursura (S20) at the Rama Krishna Beach, Visakhapatnam, India.
- A Libyan Foxtrot submarine is docked in Benghazi, Libya.

== See also ==
Equivalent submarines of the same era

- Barbel class
- Dolfijn class
- Oberon class
- Romeo class
- Narval class

== Notes ==
=== Bibliography ===
- Miller, David (2002). The Illustrated Directory of Submarines of the World. London: Salamander Books. ISBN 1-84065-375-2.
- А.Б. Широкорад: Советские подводные лодки послевоенной постройки (A.B. Shirokorad: Sowjet Submarines built after WWII) Moscow, 1997, ISBN 5-85139-019-0 (Russian)
- Y. Apalkow: Корабли ВМФ СССР. Многоцелевые ПЛ и ПЛ спецназначания ("Ships of the USSR - Multi-purpose submarines and Special submarines"), St Petersburg, 2003, ISBN 5-8172-0069-4 (Russian)
