= U-434 =

U-434 may refer to:

- German submarine U-434, Type VII submarine launched in 1941; sunk in 1941 on her first patrol
- Soviet submarine B-515, (now known as U-434), a Tango-class submarine built in 1976; currently a museum ship in Hamburg
