= AvtoVAZ Technical Museum =

Museum in Tolyatti, Russia

Coordinates: 53°33′8″N 49°15′1″E

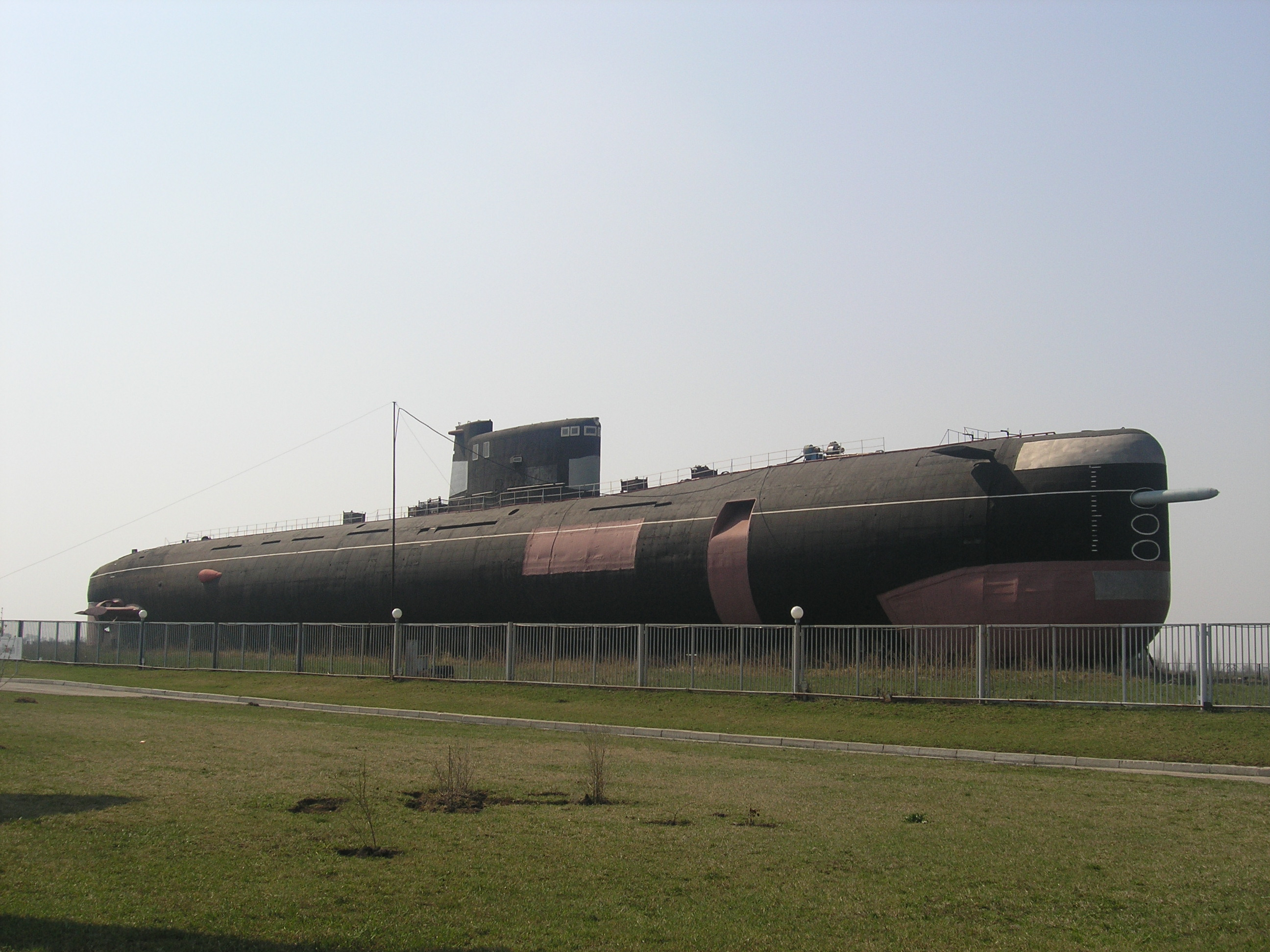
Tango class submarine B-307 at the museum

The AvtoVAZ Technical Museum is a museum in the Russian city of Tolyatti. The formal name is now K.G. Sakharov History of Technology Park Complex (Парковый комплекс истории техники имени К. Г. Сахарова).

The AvtoVAZ plant, one of the largest automobile factories in the world, is a tourist attraction. AvtoVAZ decided to add a museum to the plant, and in 1998 plans were made to develop a museum, which opened in 2001 as the AvtoVAZ Technical Museum.

The 380,000-square-metre (4,100,000 sq ft) museum (mostly outdoors) hosts about 500 vehicles of many types – cars, locomotives, boats, aircraft, and military vehicles – demonstrating the development of Soviet and Russian motorized transport. The timeline of AvtoVAZ Ladas and Zhigulis from their 1970s introduction to recent times is well covered. Among the exhibits is a 90-metre (300 ft) long Tango-class submarine, of which the transport from St Petersburg to Tolyatti was a considerable project. The submarine was installed in 2005 and parts of the interior were opened to the public in 2018.

Military vehicles from World War I are displayed, as well as World War II tanks and other vehicles, and postwar vehicles such as an Mil Mi-24 Hind helicopter and 2S7 Pion self-propelled gun. In 2003, a rover and other space vehicles were added.

In 2010, the name of the museums' primary founder, K.G.Sakharov (former vice-president of AvtoVAZ's technical development section), was attached to the museum. In 2014, control of the museum was transferred to the City of Tolyatti. At that time plans for modernization and upgrading were declared, and the museum was renamed to K.G. Sakharova History of Technology Park Complex, although it is still often referred to as the AvtoVAZ Technical Museum or, sometimes, the Tolyatti Technical Museum.

Vehicles at the museum
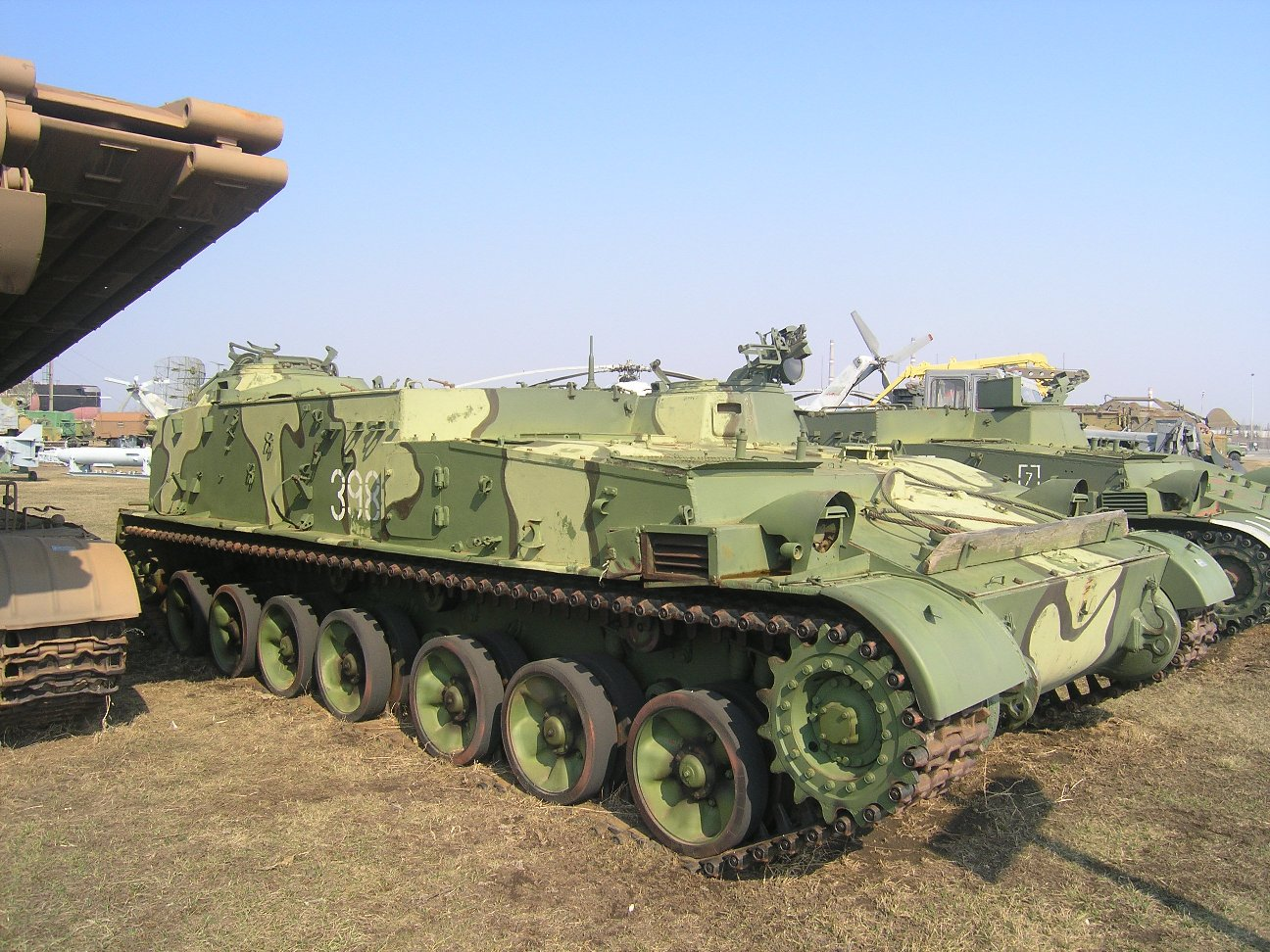
GMZ-2 tracked minelayer

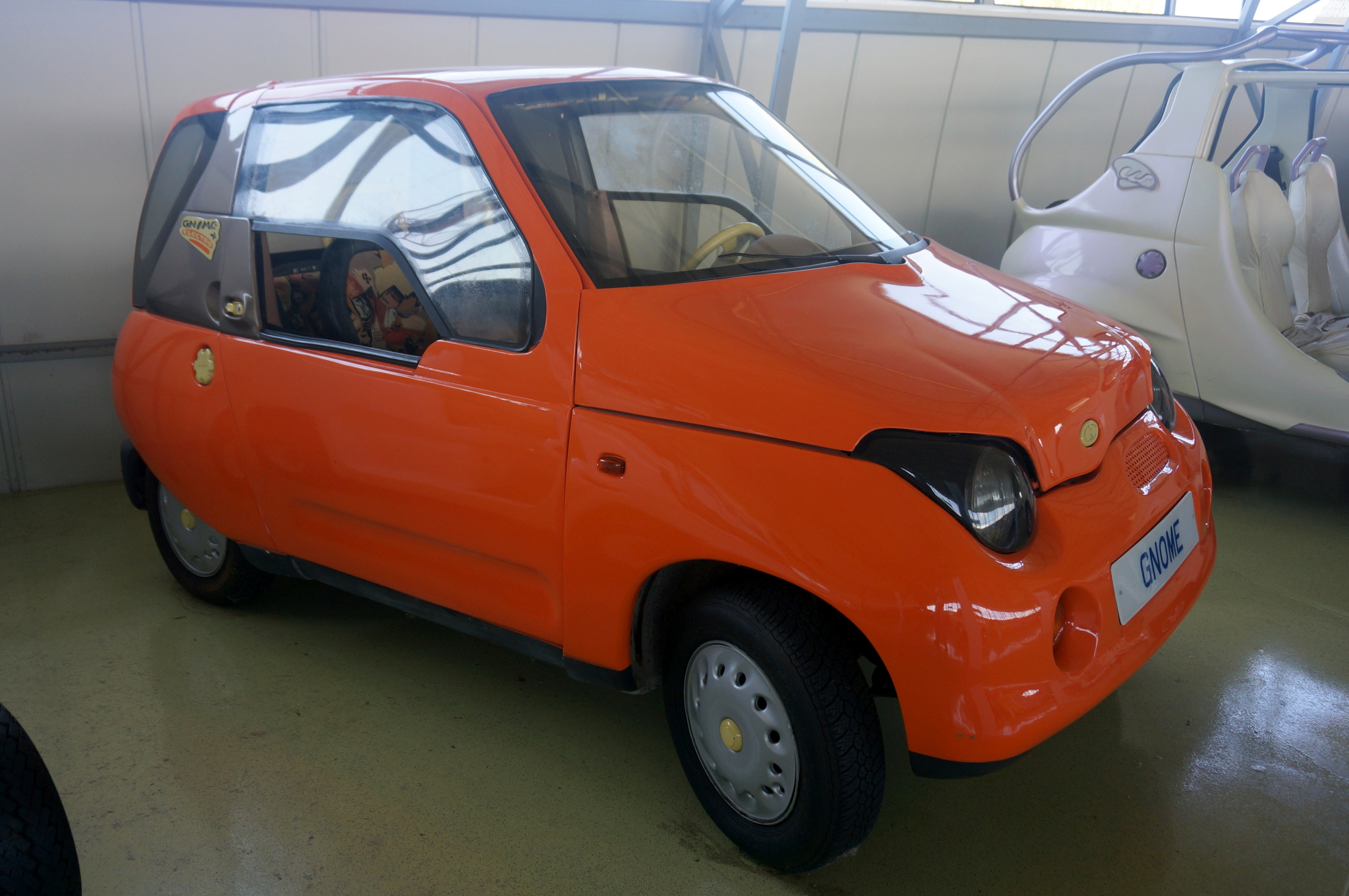
1990 concept car VAZ-1151

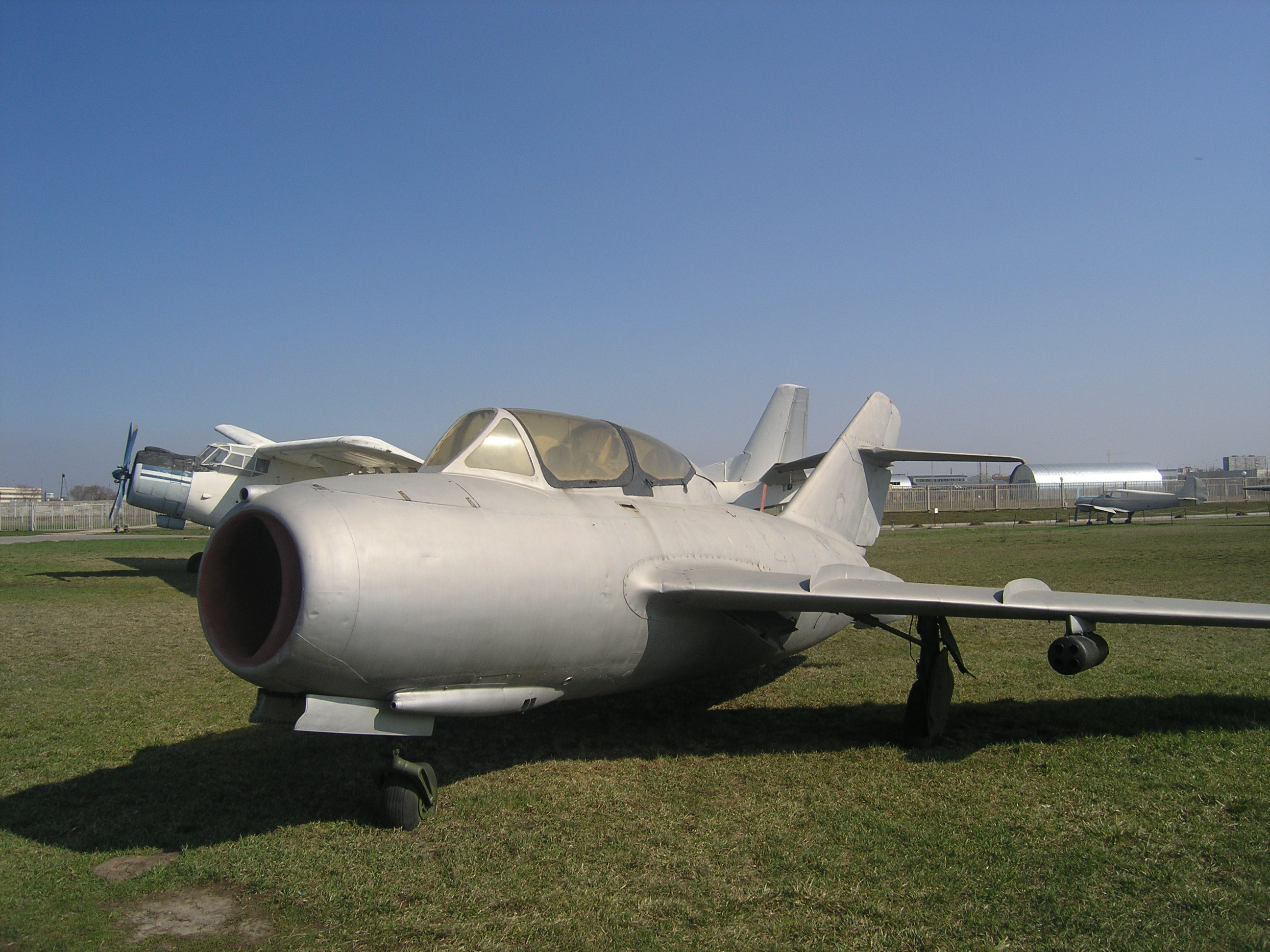
MIG-15 fighter

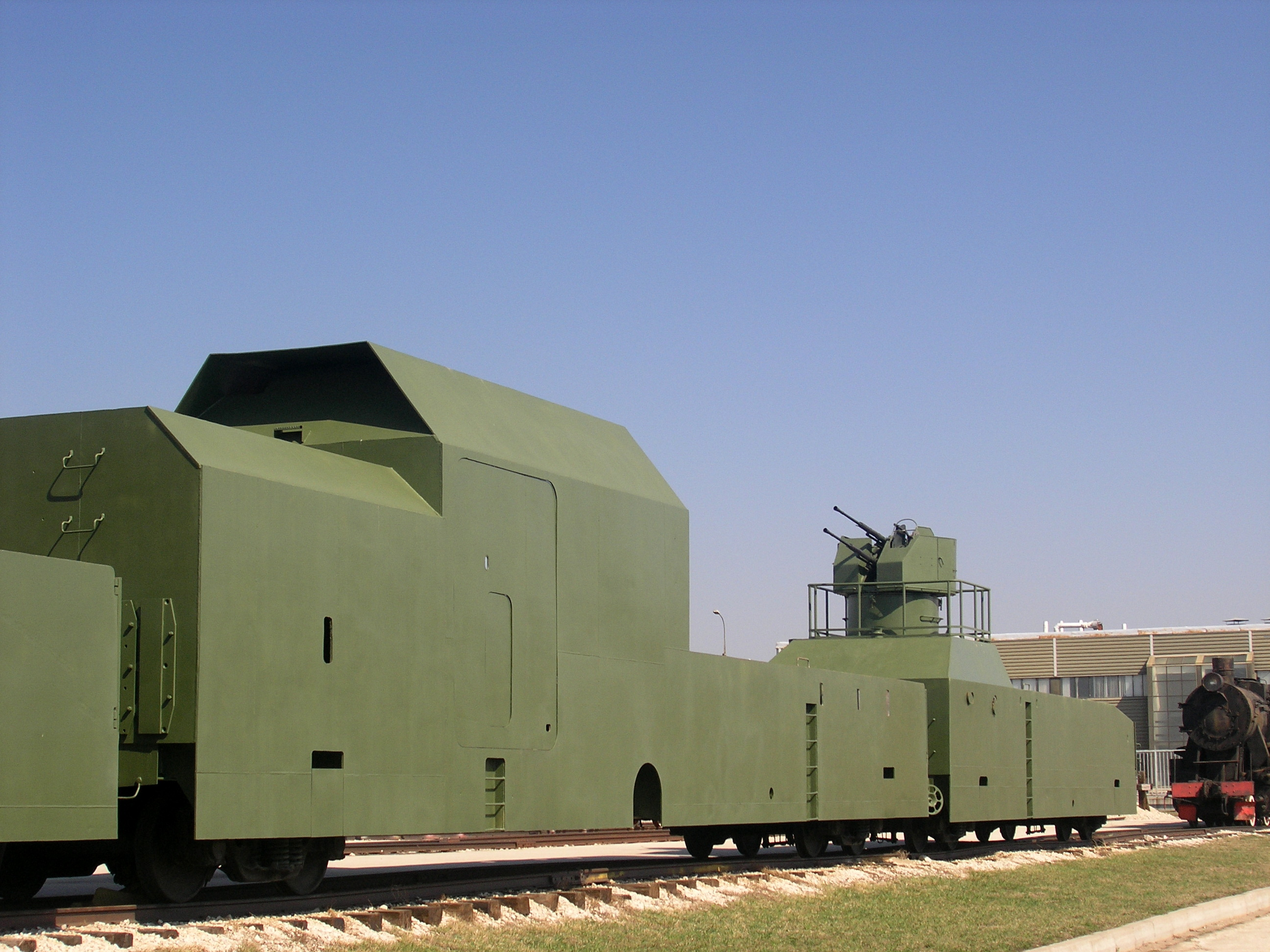
Armored train

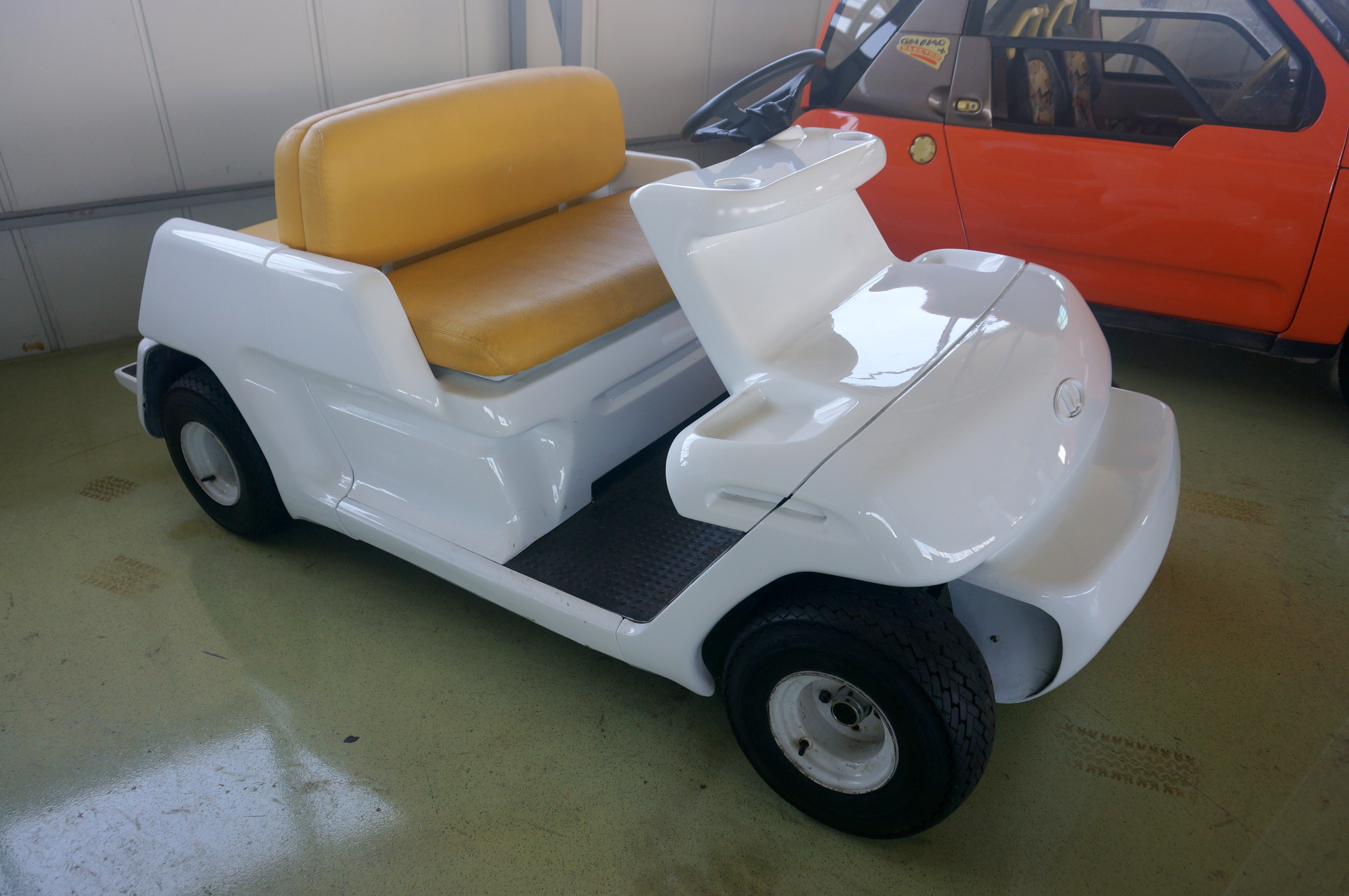
Lada golf cart

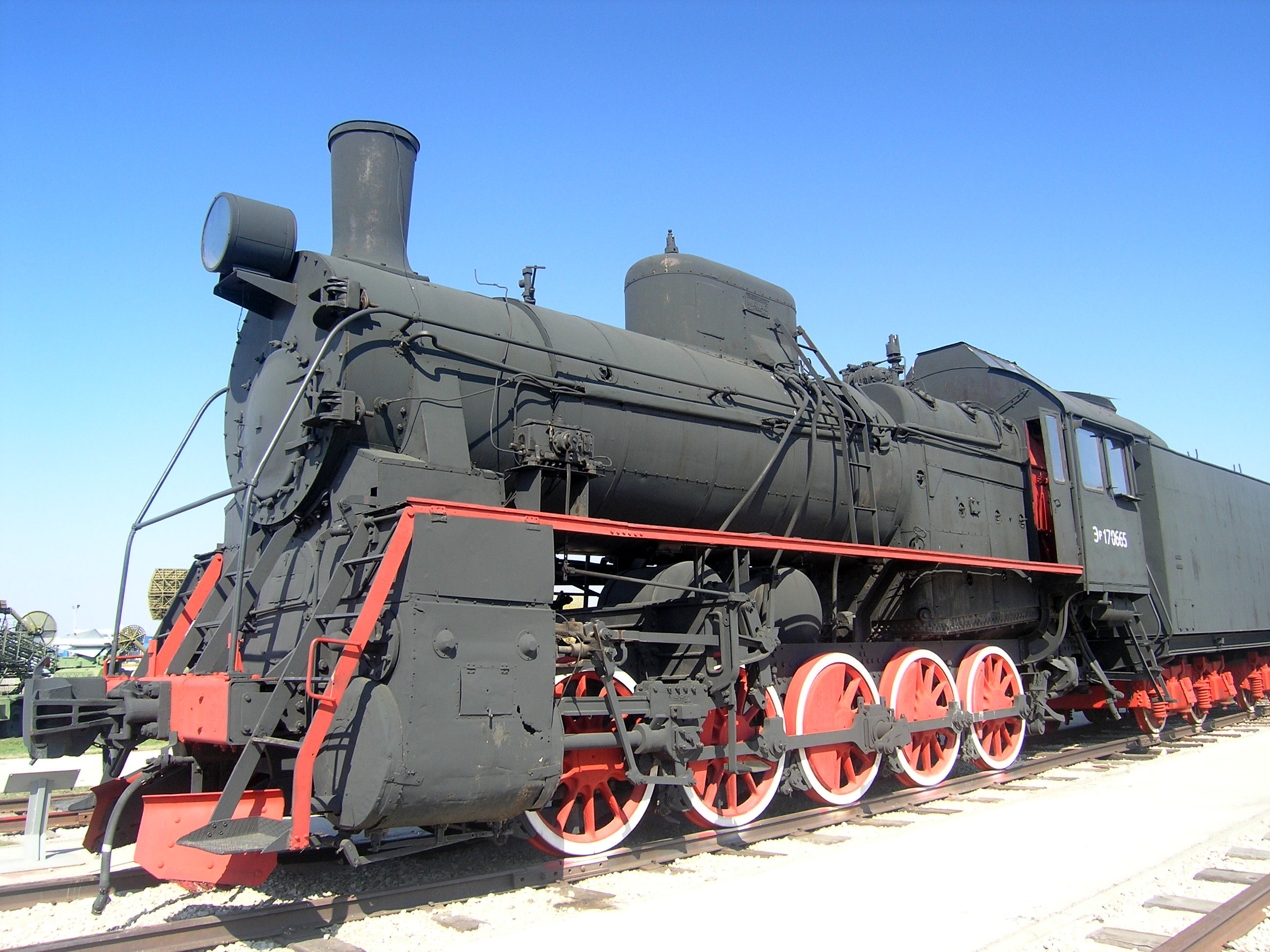
Soviet ER series locomotive

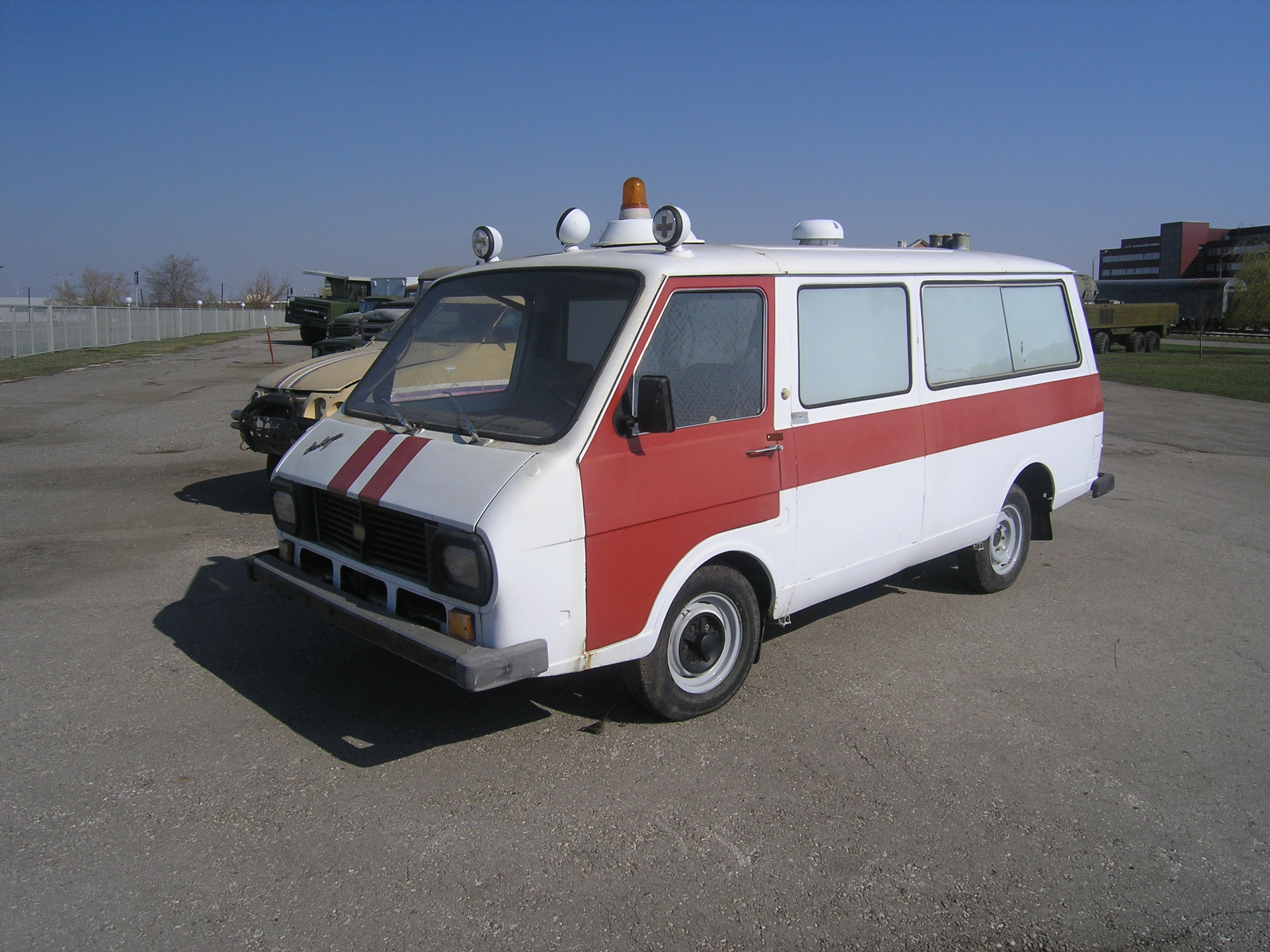
RAF-2203 van

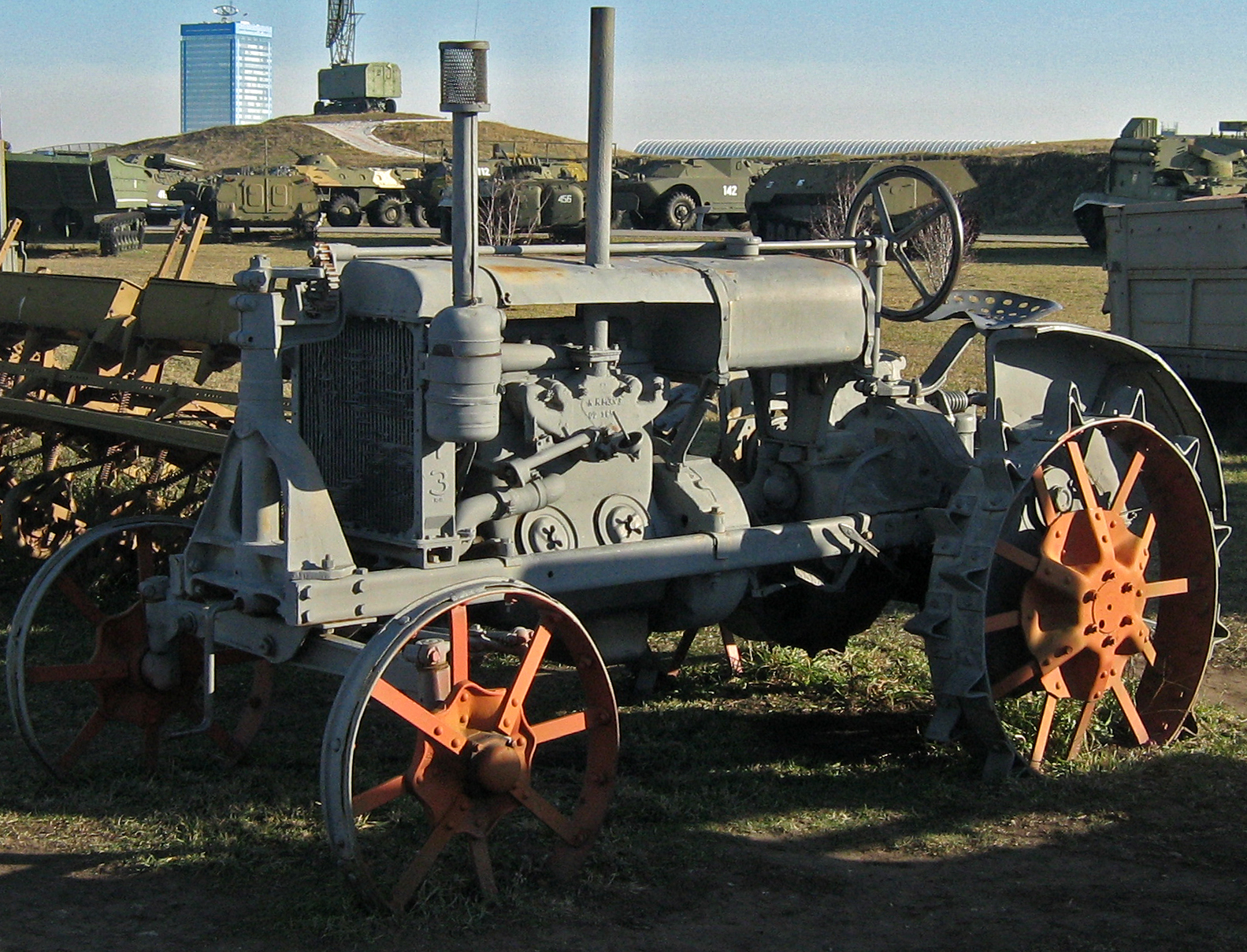
Soviet tractor, "Universal" marque
