= Soviet submarine B-515 =

1976 Tango-class submarine

Coordinates: 53°32′42″N 9°57′18″E

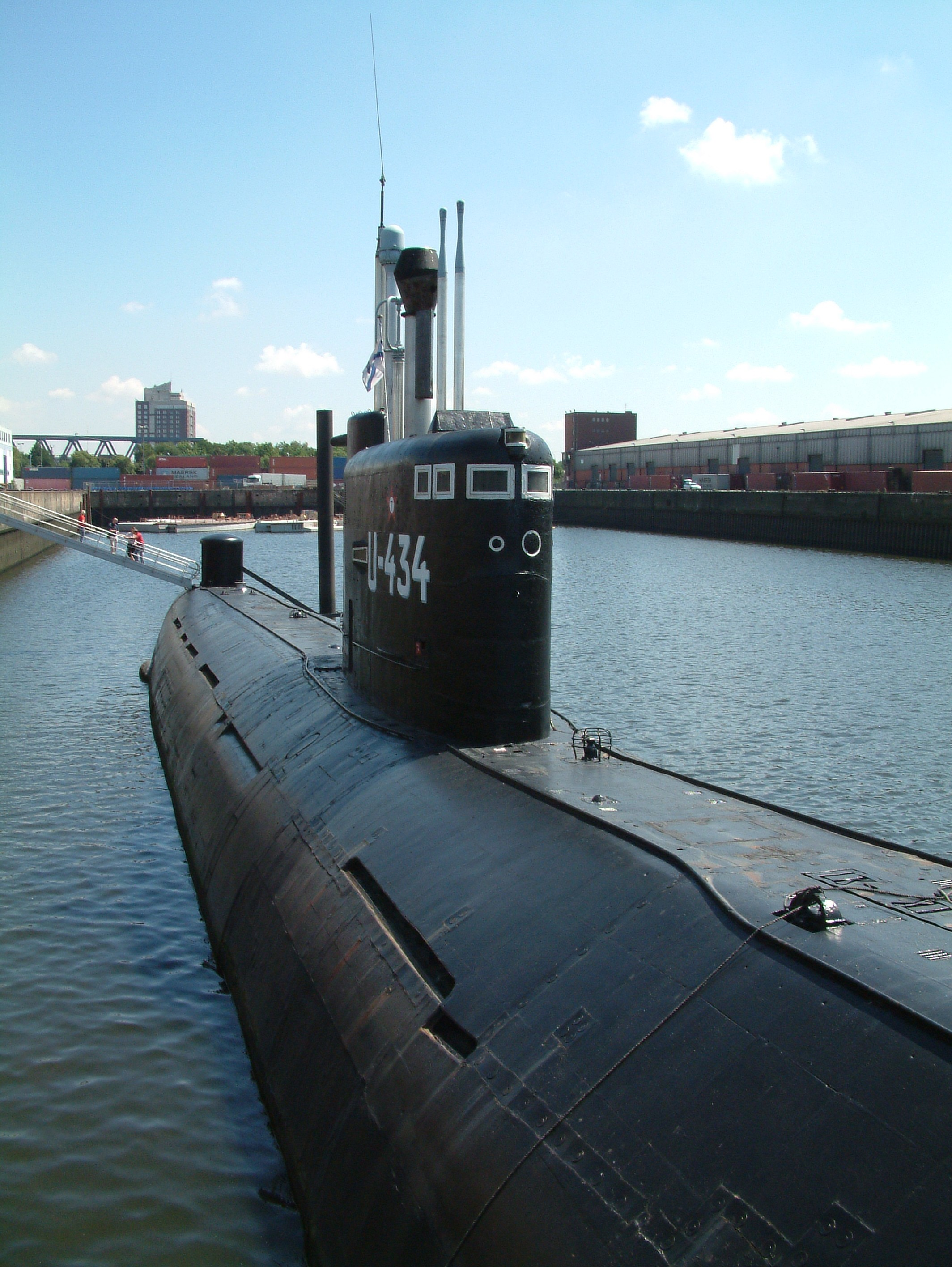
- U-434 docked in Hamburg

History

Soviet Union, Russia
- Name: B-515
- Builder: Krasnoe Sormovo, Gorky (now Nizhny Novgorod)
- Launched: 1976
- Out of service: 2002
- Fate: Museum ship in Hamburg

General characteristics
- Class & type: Tango-class submarine
- Displacement: Surfaced: 3,100 tons; Submerged: 3,800 tons
- Length: 90.16 m (295 ft 10 in)
- Beam: 8.72 m (28 ft 7 in)
- Height: 14.72 m (48 ft 4 in)
- Draught: 7.2 m (23 ft 7 in)
- Propulsion: 3 diesels delivering 6,256 shp (4,665 kW) with 3 electric motors driving 3 shafts.
- Speed: Surfaced 13 kn (24 km/h; 15 mph); submerged 16 kn (30 km/h; 18 mph)
- Complement: up to 84 (16 Officers, 16 NCO's, up to 52 crew ranks)
- Armament: 6 × 533 mm (21 in) bow torpedo tubes.; 24 × 533 mm (21 in) anti-submarine and anti-ship torpedoes or equivalent load of mines

B-515 is a Tango-class submarine of the Soviet and Russian Navies. It remained in active service until 2001. It is currently docked in Hamburg and is open to the public as a museum exhibit. The submarine is sometimes referred to as U-434, which derives from the pennant number painted on the vessel.

This submarine was used for hunting, espionage, and patrol purposes. A 78-man crew operated the boat.

The submarine U-434 came from the Krasnoye Sormovo submarine shipyard in Nizhny Novgorod and was built in 1976 in just eight months. It was placed in the service of the Soviet Northern Fleet and remained in service until April 2002. Because of the long period in which the vessel was inactive and the extensive modifications made when B-515 became a museum ship, all major systems such as engine and hydraulics were deactivated. It has a six-centimeter thick rubber coating, so it was harder to locate using sonar.

After being decommissioned, investors bought it for one million euros and brought it to Hamburg. The transport of the vessel cost a further million euros. A prerequisite for the transfer was that the submarine was not allowed to carry out the journey itself, but had to be towed. The Russian Navy detained the submarine before the transfer and removed many technical facilities, mainly weapon systems and control systems, as well as other technical equipment subject to secrecy rules. After arrival in Hamburg, further modifications were made to the submarine. Larger holes were cut in the fuselage at the bow and stern to provide visitors with entry and exit points. Due to these modifications, the submarine is no longer capable of diving or independent operation. Until April 15, 2010, the submarine was in Hamburg's HafenCity. B-515 is now set aground at St. Pauli fish market in the immediate vicinity of the jetties and serves as the "Submarine Museum Hamburg". During low tide the original propellers can be seen, along with the dive planes and rudder.

== Gallery ==
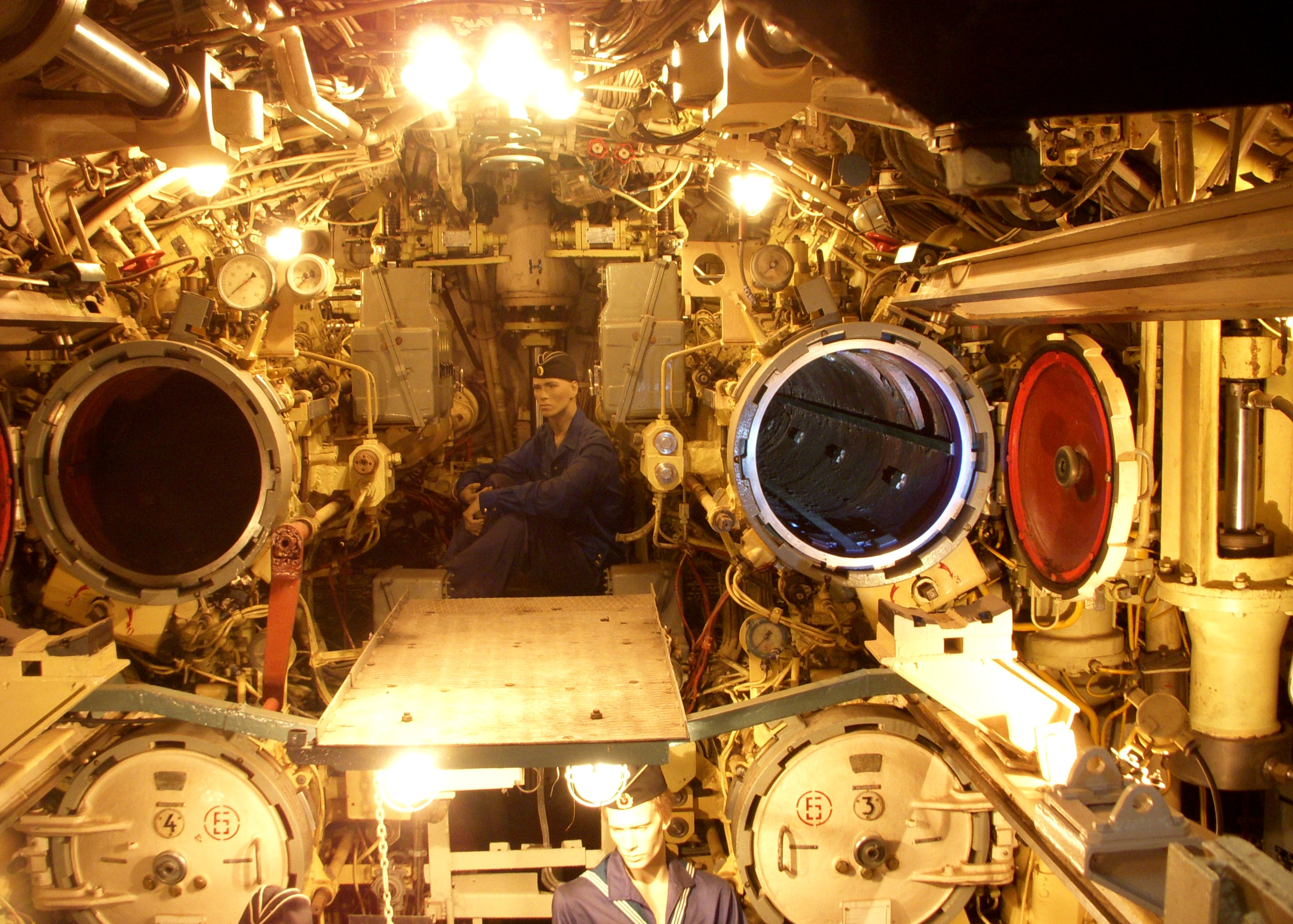
Interior

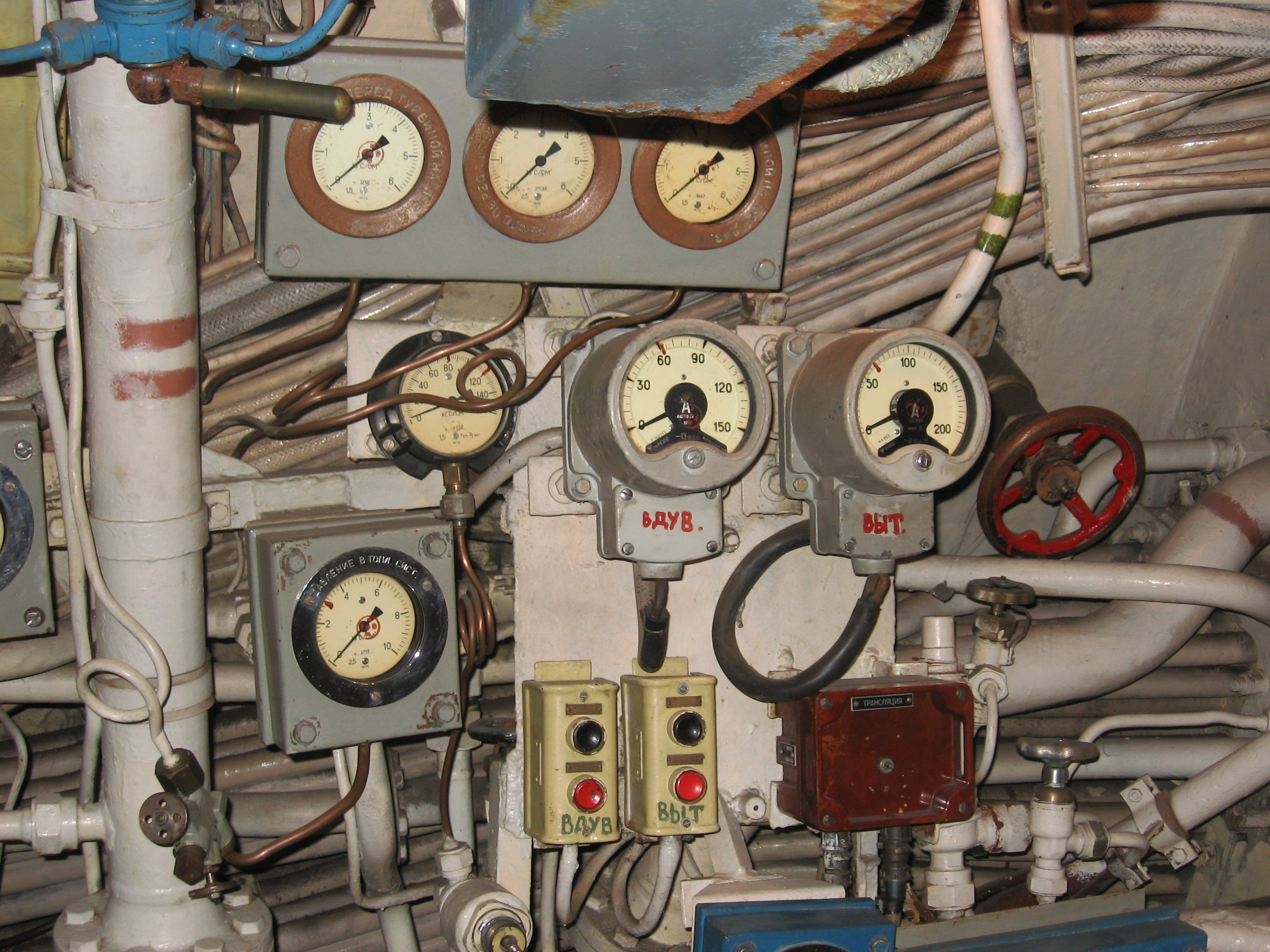
Diesel compartment (V) ventilation controls

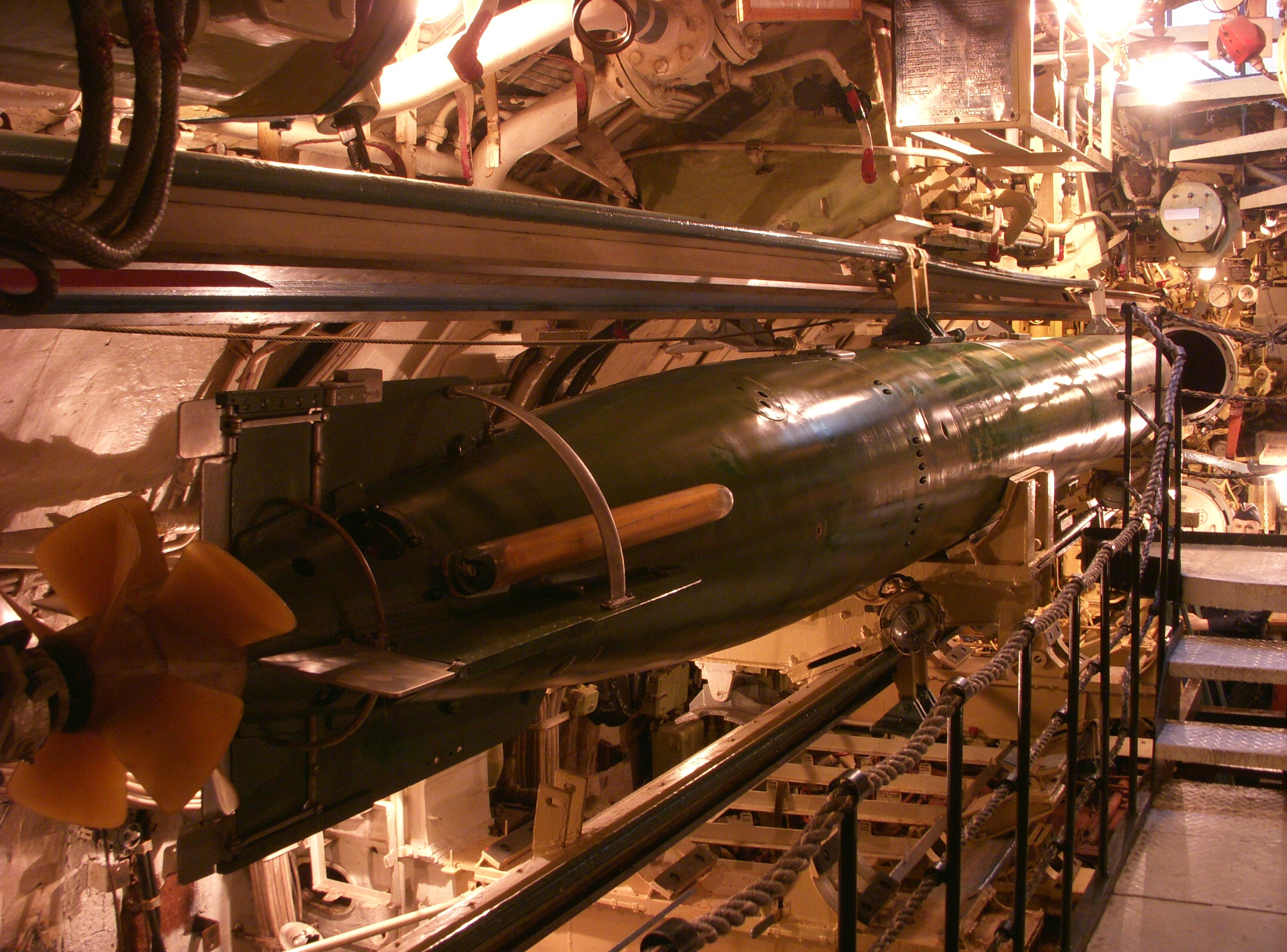
Torpedo in the submarine

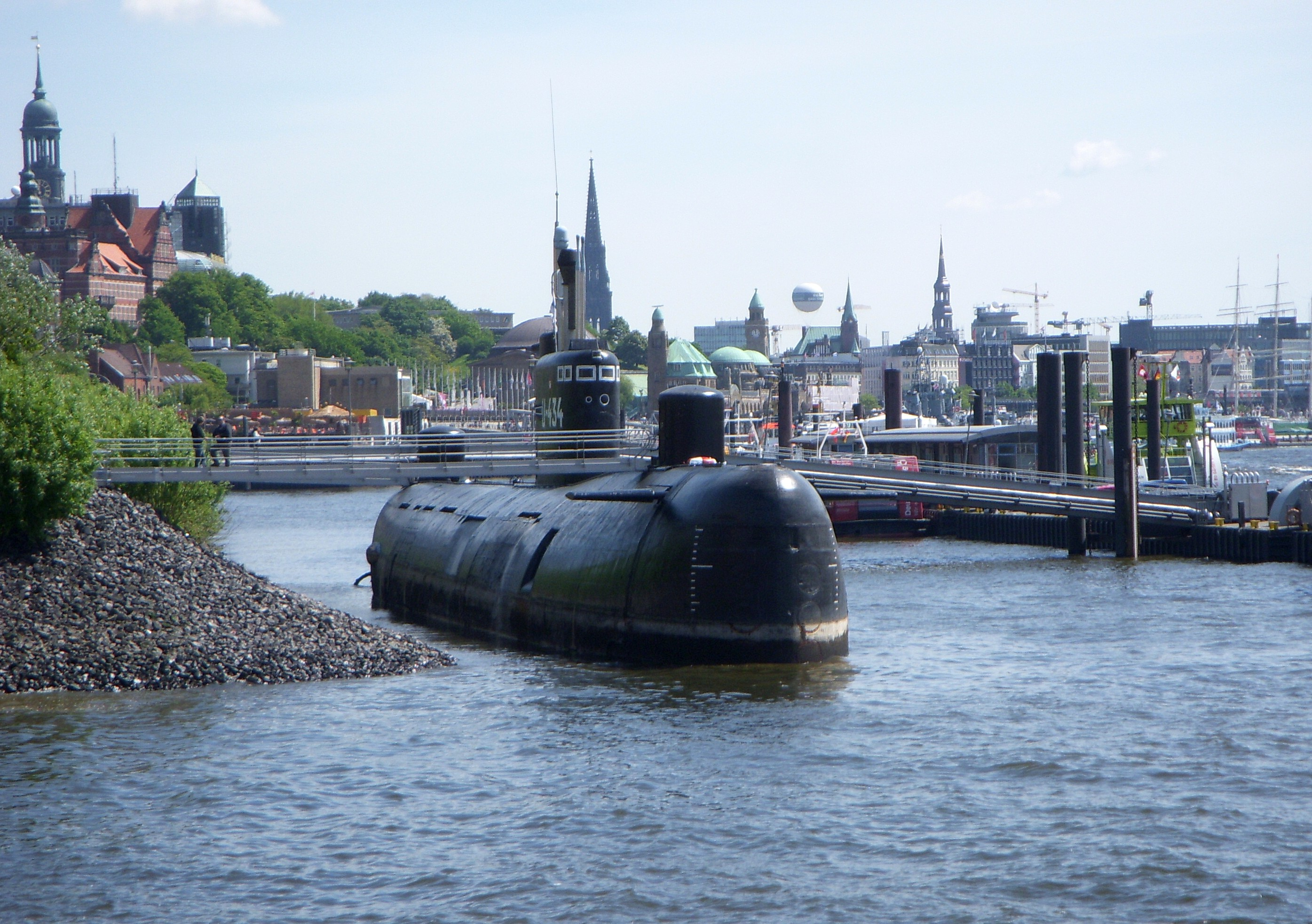
B-515 museum, river view

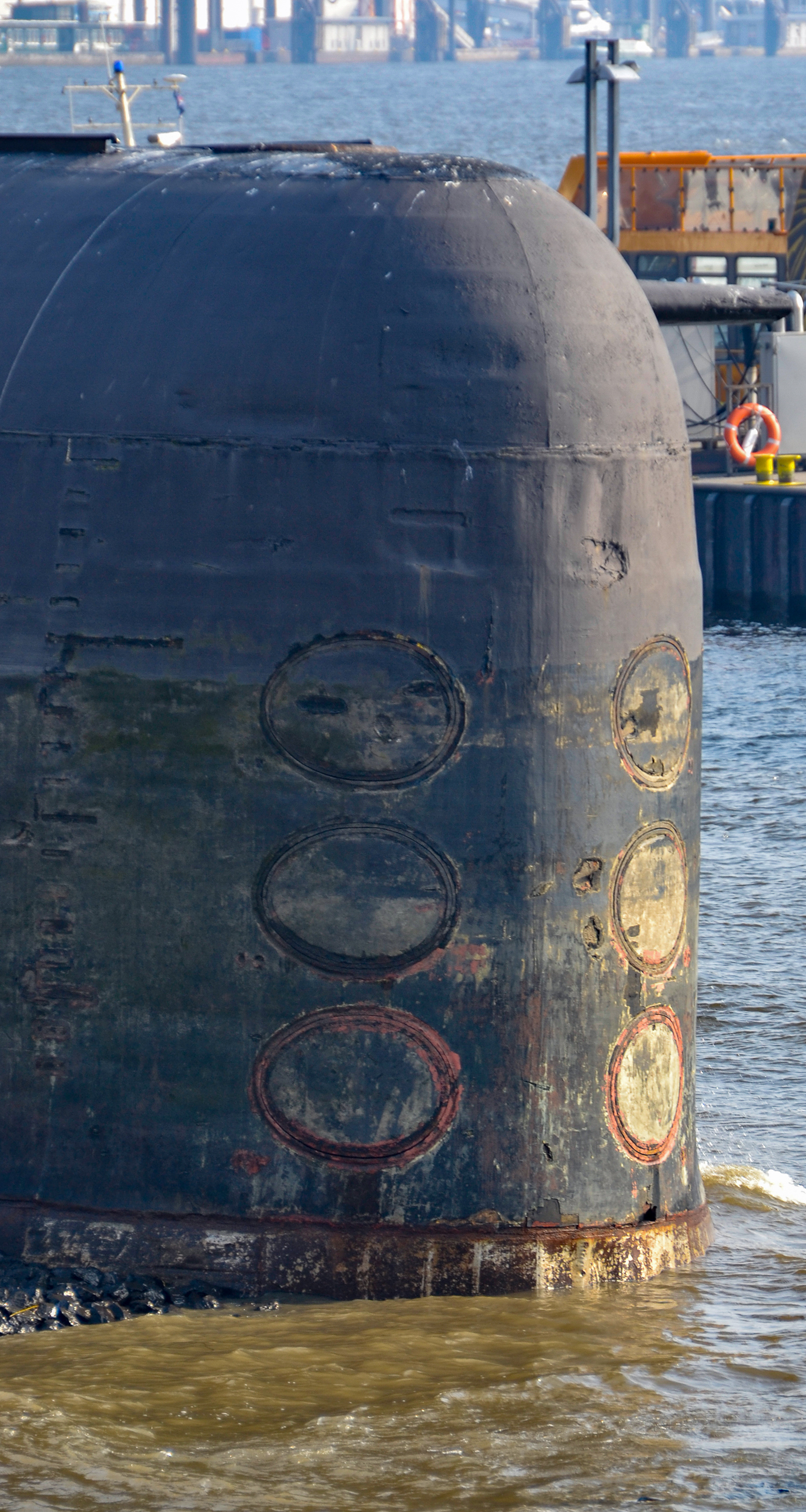
The six 533 mm bow torpedo tubes
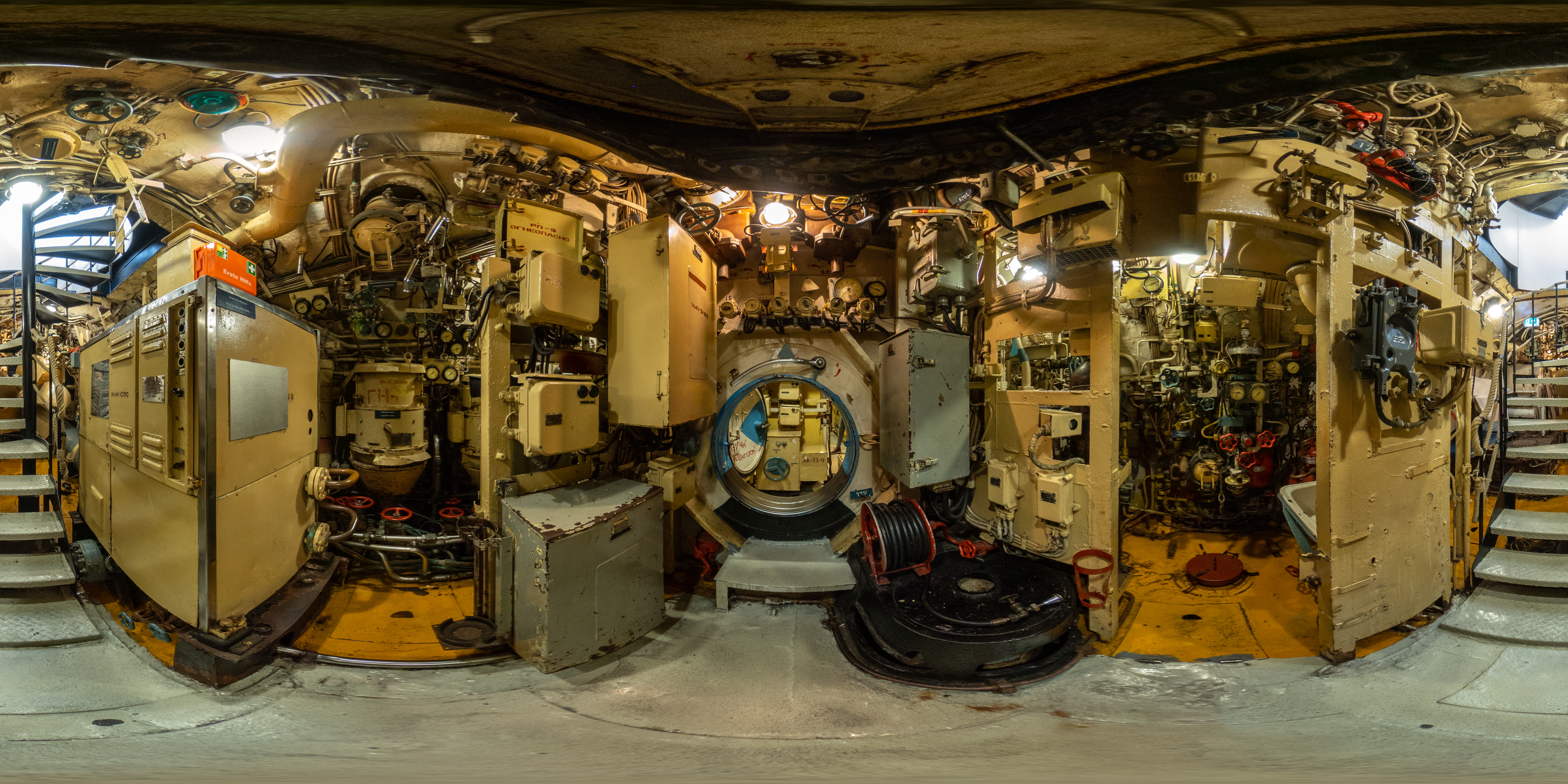
Panorama of the submarine's interior. View as a 360° interactive panorama
