= VAZ-1151 =

Russian city car concept

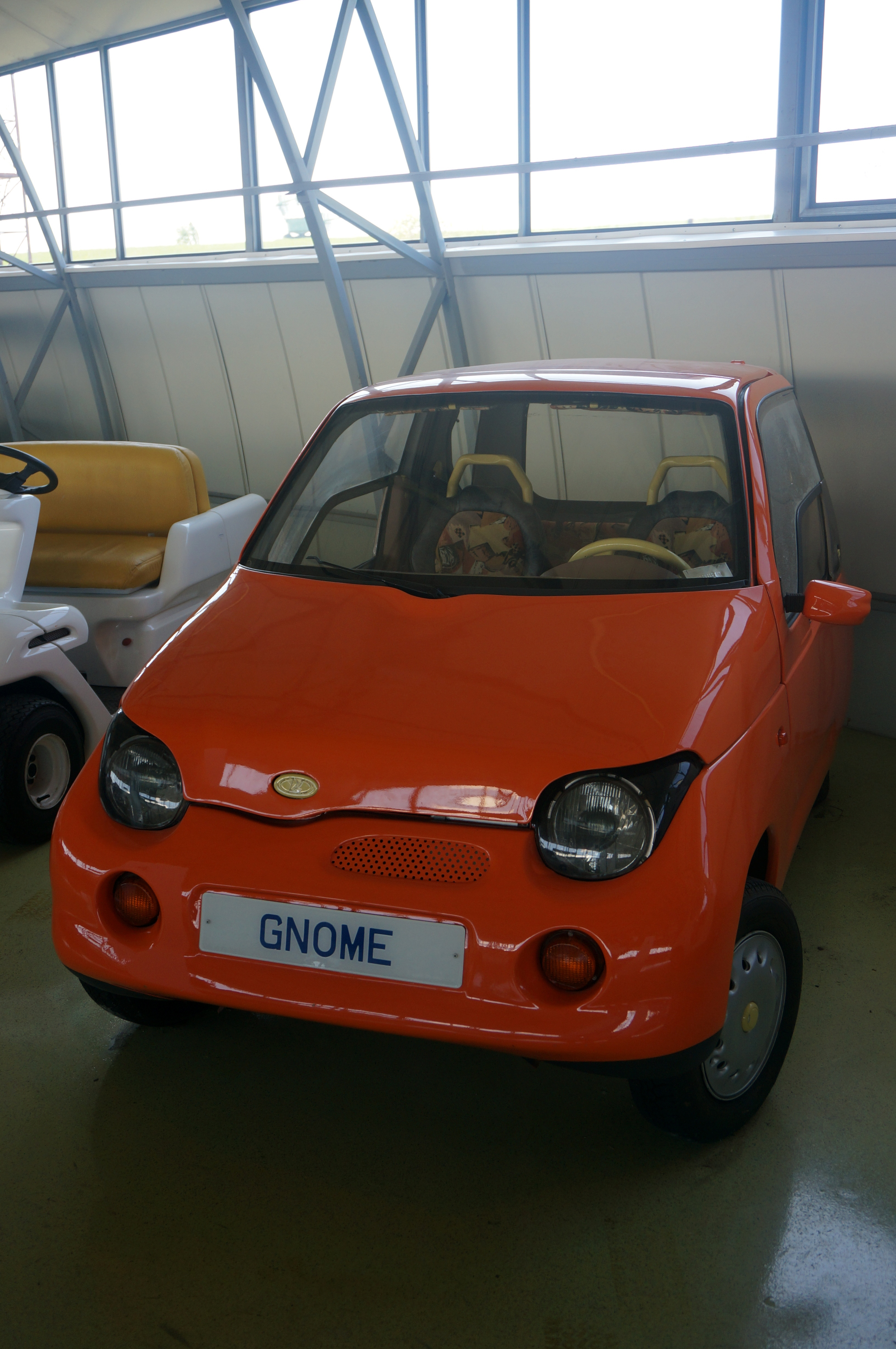
VAZ-1151

VAZ-1151 or Гном (Gnome) is a city car concept from the Russian car company AvtoVAZ from 1990. Head designer was Petr Prusov.

The car was very compact. Despite a length of 2.65 meters (slightly shorter than a Smart Fortwo at 2.69 meters) it was a four-seater (designed to fit 2 adults and 2 children). The total weight was 500 kg (compared to 730 kg for the Smart) and used small 12" wheels. The turning radius was exceptionally small, only 3.5 meters (compared with 6.95 for the Smart). The 1151 was powered by the small front-mounted 650cc 2-cylinder engine from the VAZ-1111/Lada Oka.

It was also presented as an electric beach buggy version called Elf (VAZ-1152).

The VAZ-1151 was also shown in an electric version at the 1996 Turin Motor Show.
