= Tango-class submarine =

Soviet diesel-electric submarine class

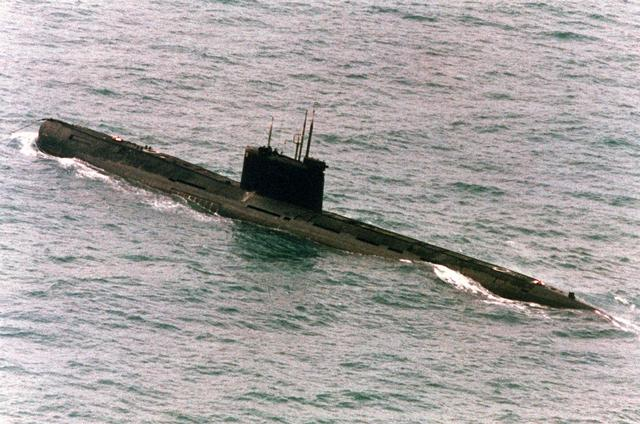
- A Tango-class submarine in the North Atlantic.

Class overview
- Name: Tango class (Project 641B)
- Builders: Gorky
- Operators: Soviet Navy
- Preceded by: Foxtrot class
- Succeeded by: Kilo class
- In service: 1972–2016
- In commission: 1972
- Completed: 18
- Active: 0
- Retired: 18
- Preserved: 3

General characteristics
- Type: Submarine
- Displacement: 3,100 tons surfaced; 3,800 tons submerged
- Length: 91 m (298 ft 7 in)
- Beam: 9.1 m (29 ft 10 in)
- Draught: 7.2 m (23 ft 7 in)
- Propulsion: 3 diesel engines; 4.6 MW (6,200 shp); 3 electric motors; 3 shafts.
- Speed: 13 knots (24 km/h; 15 mph) surfaced; 16 knots (30 km/h; 18 mph) submerged
- Complement: 62 men (12 officers)
- Armament: 6 × 533 mm (21.0 in) bow torpedo tubes; 24 × 533 mm (21 in) anti-submarine and anti-ship torpedoes or equivalent load of mines

The Tango class was the NATO reporting name of a class of diesel-electric submarines that were built in the Soviet Union to replace the Foxtrot-class submarines assigned to the Black Sea and Northern Fleets. The Soviet designation of this class was Project 641B and it was also known as the Som (Catfish) class. The first of the class was completed in 1972 at Gorky. A total of 18 were built in two slightly different versions. The later type was several metres longer than the first, possibly because of the installation of ASW missile equipment.

== Design and construction ==
The bow sonar installations appear to be similar to those fitted to Soviet nuclear attack submarines. The propulsion plant was the same as the last subgroup of the Foxtrot class. The Tango class had far more battery capacity, far higher than any previous conventional submarine class in the Soviet Navy; as a result, pressure hull volume increased. This allowed an underwater endurance in excess of a week before snorkeling was required.

Coupled with new armament and sensor fit, the Tango class was ideal for ambush operations against Western nuclear submarines at natural chokepoints.

Because of its all-hull rubber coating, the sub class was nicknamed "rezinka" [rubber].

Construction of this class has now stopped. The B-380 of the Black Sea Fleet was the last to be decommissioned in 2016 and the scrapping began in Inkerman in 2020.

== Service history ==
B-380 had been in layup in Sevastopol Harbor awaiting either refit or scrapping as of 2008, but during the night of December 14–15, 2019 the floating dock PD-16, which contained B-380, sank. B-380 capsized to port and partially sank, and by 19 December it was still unclear whether the submarine was afloat or resting on the bottom. By 11 May 2020 B-380 was 70% scrapped.

By October 2021, the sail of submarine B-380 had been installed, with the assistance of the Russian Maritime Tradition Club Association, at the Mistral Hotel & Spa, Intra district of Moscow.

== Museum ships ==
Schematic of the Tango class

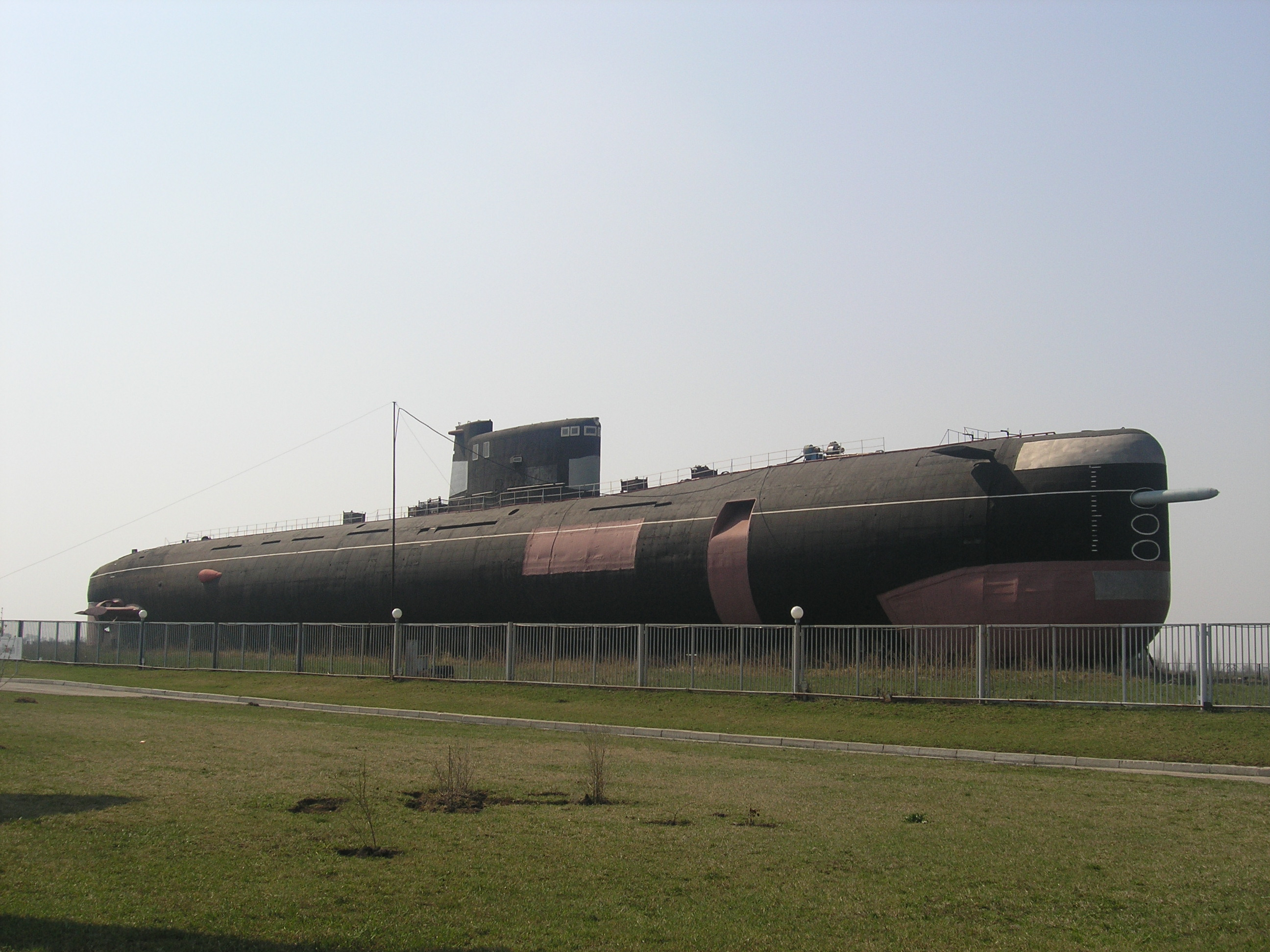
B-307, Tolyatti

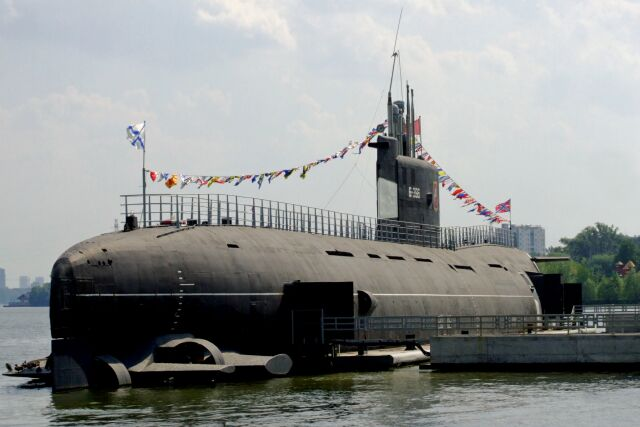
B-396, Moscow

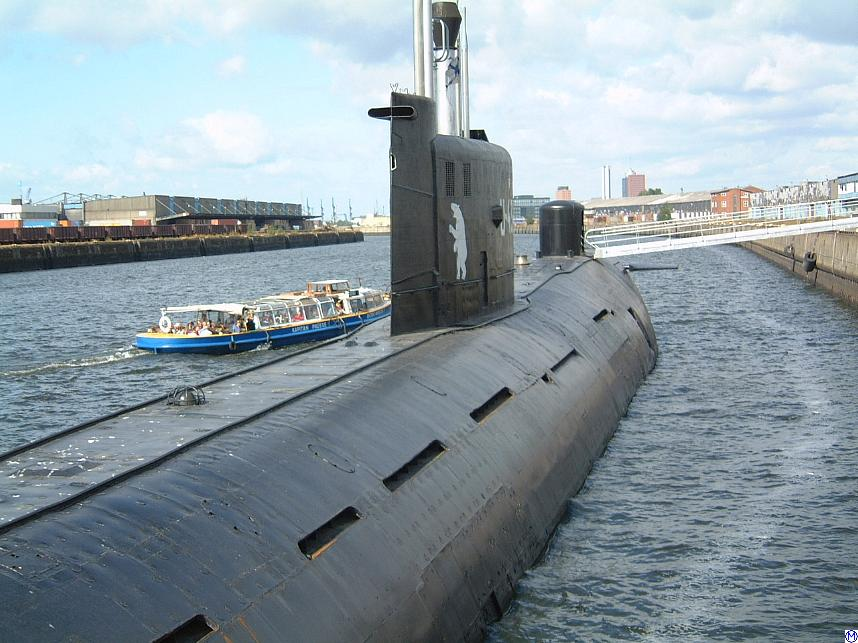
B-515, Hamburg

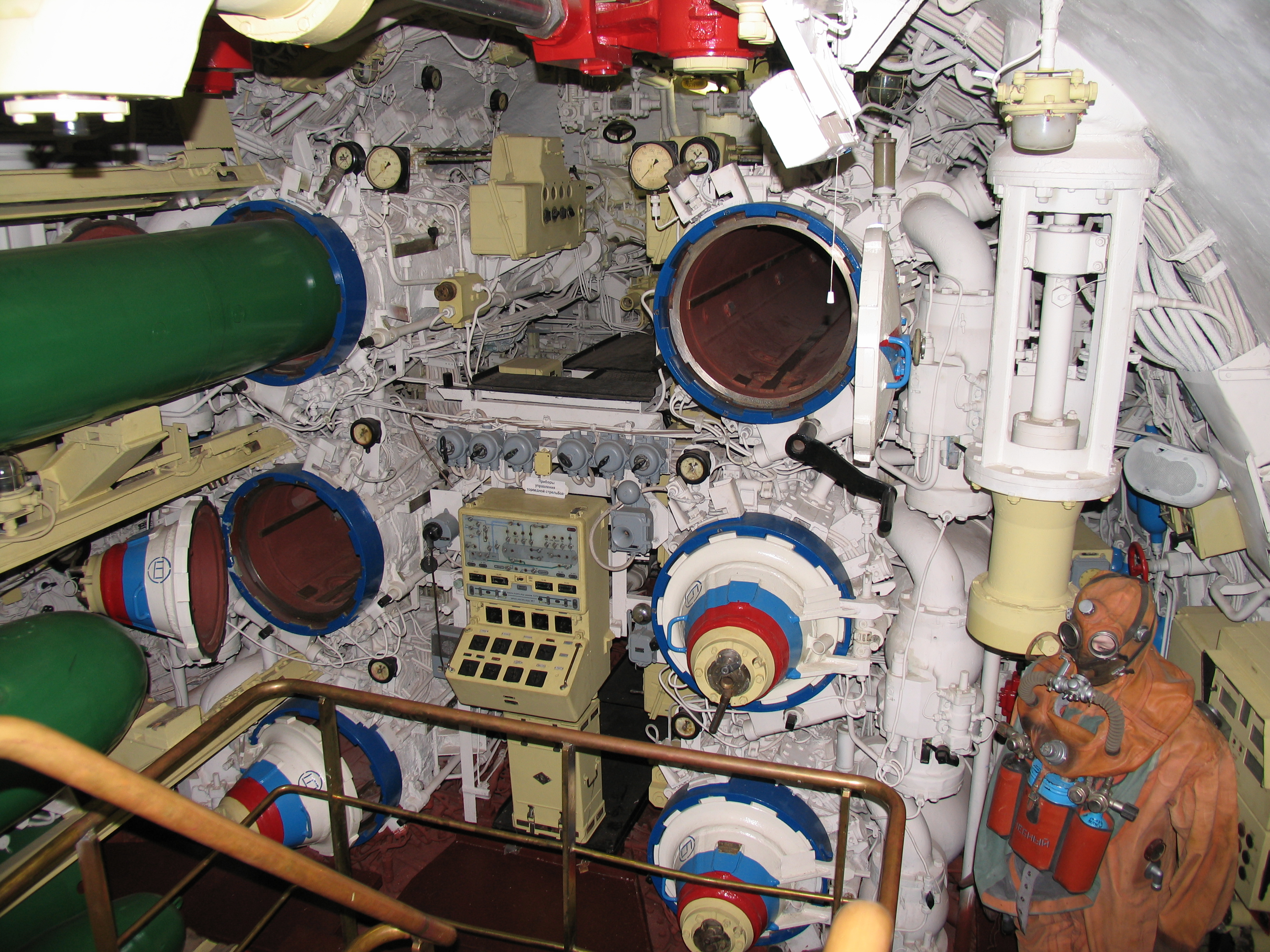
Tango B-396 torpedo room

Three 641B-class submarines operate as museum ships:

- B-307, fully raised on ground – AvtoVAZ Technical Museum, Tolyatti, Russia
- B-396, afloat in Tushino reservoir – Moscow Navy Museum
- B-515, afloat near Fischmarkt in Hamburg – museum in Hamburg

The conning towers of stricken B-319' and B-474 are on display in Polyarny and Ryazan.

== See also ==
Equivalent submarines of the same era

- Yūshio class
- Zwaardvis class
- Vela class
- Type 035A
