= List of Soviet and Russian submarine classes =

Submarines of the Soviet Navy were developed by numbered "projects", which were sometimes but not always given names. During the Cold War, NATO nations referred to these classes by NATO reporting names, based on intelligence data, which did not always correspond with the projects. See:

- List of NATO reporting names for ballistic missile submarines
- List of NATO reporting names for guided missile submarines
- List of NATO reporting names for hunter-killer and experimental submarines

The NATO reporting names were based on the British (and later American) habit of naming submarines with a letter of the alphabet indicating the class, followed by a serial number of that class. The names are the radiotelephonic alphabet call sign of a letter of the alphabet. For security purposes, the "pennant numbers" of Soviet submarines were not sequential, any more than those of Soviet surface vessels were.

Most Russian (and Soviet) submarines had no "personal" name, but were only known by a number, prefixed by letters identifying the boat's type at a higher level than her class. Those letters included:

- К (K): крейсерская (kreyserskaya, "cruiser")
- ТК (TK): тяжёлая крейсерская (tyazholaya kreyserskaya, "heavy cruiser")
- Б (B): большая (bolshaya, "large")
- С (S): средняя (srednyaya, "medium")
- М (M): малая (malaya, "small")

Any of those prefixes could have С (S) added to the end, standing for специальная (spetsialnaya) and meaning "designed for special missions":

- New weapon, engines and armament testing
- Submarines for long-range radio communications
- Target submarines for anti-submarine training
- Rescue service submarines
- Covert operations

== Diesel-electric ==
=== Russo-Japanese War ===
- Delfin
- Kasatka-class submarine
- Som-class submarine
- Forel single unit/one off unit (class of its own)
- Osetr-class submarine

=== World War I era ===
- Pochtovy
- Minoga
- Akula
- Karp-class submarine
- Kaiman-class submarine
- Morzh-class submarine
- Narval-class submarine
- Krab
- Amerikansky Golland (Holland 602GF/602L type)
- Bars-class submarine

=== World War II era ===
Project	Series	Image	Built	Assignment
Dekabrist-class submarine	Series I		6	large positional submarine
Leninets-class submarine	Series II, XI, XIII, XIII-1938		25	Minelayers
Shchuka-class submarine	Series III, V, V-bis, V-bis-2, X, X-1938		86	Medium-sized patrol submarines.
Pravda-class submarine	Serie IV		3	Squadron submarines.
Malyutka-class submarine	Series VI, VI-bis, XII, XV		110	Small submarines for coastal patrols.
S-class submarine	Series IX, IX-bis		41	Medium submarines, built using German project (early version of Type IX).
K-class submarine	Serie XIV		11	Cruiser submarines with combined arms.
TS-class submarine			3	Former submarines of the Royal Romanian Navy: Rechinul (TS-1), Marsuinul (TS-2) and Delfinul (TS-3)

=== Post-World War II era ===
==== Attack submarines ====
Project	NATO reporting name	Silhouette/Image	Built	Assignment
611	Zulu class		26	Large oceanic submarines
613	Whiskey class		215	Medium multi-purpose submarines
615	Quebec class		30	Small submarines with full-diesel propulsion
617	Whale class		1	Experimental submarines which had a Walter engine fuelled by high test peroxide (HTP)
633	Romeo class		20	Medium submarines
641	Foxtrot class		75	Large oceanic submarines
641B Cом (Som, catfish)	Tango class		18	Large oceanic submarines
690 Кефаль (Kefal, mullet)	Bravo class		4	Target submarine for torpedo exercises
877, 877E, 877EKM, 877V, 877LPMB, 877EK Палтус (Paltus, halibut)	Kilo class		43	Large submarines
636, 636М Варшавянка (Varshavyanka, after Warsaw Pact)	Improved Kilo class		30	Large submarines
677 Лада (Lada, goddess of love)	St. Petersburg		3	Large submarines
1650 Амур (the Amur River)			0	Modification of Lada class for export
865 Пиранья (Piran'ya, piranha)	Losos class (Salmon)		2	Midget submarines

==== Guided missile submarines ====
Project	NATO reporting name	Silhouette/Image	Built	Assignment
P613	Whiskey Single Cylinder			1 × SS-N-3 cruise missile
644	Whiskey Twin Cylinder			2 × SS-N-3 cruise missile
665	Whiskey Long Bin			4 × SS-N-3 cruise missile
651	Juliett		16	Four SS-N-3 Shaddock (P-5 or P-6), or SS-N-12 Sandbox (P-500 4K-80 Basalt)

==== Ballistic missile submarines ====
Project	NATO reporting name	Silhouette/Image	Built	Assignment
V611, 611AV	Zulu		6	
629, 609, 601, 605, 619	Golf	Golf II-class submarine	24	3 × Project 629 boats D-1 launch system with R-11FM missiles

==== Auxiliary submarines ====
Project	NATO reporting name	Silhouette/Image	Built	Assignment
940 Ленок (Lenok)	India		2	2 × Poseidon class DSRV's
1710 Макрель (Makrel, mackerel)	Beluga		1	It was an experimental vessel used for testing propulsion systems, hull forms, and boundary-layer control techniques.
1840	Lima		1	Large special. It was used for trying out new technologies, research, or special mission support

== Nuclear-powered ==
=== Attack submarines ===
==== First generation ====
Project	NATO reporting name	Silhouette/Image	Built	Assignment
627 Кит, 645 Кит-ЖМТ (Kit, whale)	November		14	First soviet submarines powered by nuclear reactor

==== Second generation ====
Project	NATO reporting name	Silhouette/Image	Built	Assignment
671, 671B, 671K, 671R Ёрш (Yorsh, ruffe)	Victor I		16	
671RT	Victor II		7	
671RTM Щука (Shchuka, pike)	Victor III		25	

==== Third generation ====
Project	NATO reporting name	Silhouette/Image	Built	Assignment
705, 705K Лира (Lira, lyre)	Alfa		7	
945 Барракуда (Barrakuda, barracuda)	Sierra I		2	
945A Кондор (Kondor, condor)	Sierra II		2	
685 Плавник (Plavnik, fin)	Mike	K-278 Komsomolets	1	Record submergence depth of 1,020 metres (3,350 feet)

==== Fourth generation ====
Project	NATO reporting name	Silhouette/Image	Built	Assignment
Project 971 Щука-Б (Shchuka-B, Pike-B)	Akula		15	
Project 885 Ясень (Yasen, ash)	Severodvinsk		4	Planned 12

=== Guided missile submarines ===
==== First generation ====
Project	NATO reporting name	Silhouette/Image	Built	Assignment
659	Echo I		5	
675	Echo II		29	

==== Second generation ====
Project	NATO reporting name	Silhouette/Image	Built	Assignment
661 Анчар (Anchar, upas)	Papa		1	Fastest speed ever recorded for a submerged vehicle at 44.7 knots
667AT Груша (Grusha, pear)	Yankee Notch		4	
667M Андромеда (Andromeda, the constellation)	Yankee Sidecar		1	
670 Скат (Skat, ray)	Charlie I		11	
670M Скат-М (Skat-M, ray)	Charlie II		6	

==== Third generation ====
Project	NATO reporting name	Silhouette/Image	Built	Assignment
949 Гранит (Granit, granite)	Oscar I		2	
949A Антей (Antey, Antaeus)	Oscar II		11	

==== Fourth generation ====
Project	NATO reporting name	Silhouette/Image	Built	Assignment
885 Ясень (Yasen, ash)	Severodvinsk		4	Planned 12

=== Ballistic missile submarines ===
==== First generation ====
Project	NATO reporting name	Silhouette/Image	Built	Assignment
658, 701	Hotel		8	

==== Second generation ====
Project	NATO reporting name	Silhouette/Image	Built	Assignment
667A Навага, 667AU Налим (Navaga; Nalim, burbot)	Yankee I		34	
667AM Навага-М (Navaga-M)	Yankee II		1	
667B Мурена (Murena, eel)	Delta I		18	
667BD Мурена-М (Murena-M, eel)	Delta II		4	
667BDR Кальмар (Kal'mar, squid)	Delta III		14	
667BDRM Дельфин (Del'fin, dolphin)	Delta IV		7	

==== Third generation ====
Project	NATO reporting name	Silhouette/Image	Built	Assignment
941 Акула; (Akula, shark)	Typhoon		6	

==== Fourth generation ====
Project	NATO reporting name	Silhouette/Image	Built	Assignment
955 Борей; (Borei, Boreas)	Dolgorukiy		3	
955А Борей; (Borei, Boreas)	Dolgorukiy		5	

=== Auxiliary submarines ===
Project	NATO reporting name	Silhouette/Image	Built	Assignment
1910 Кашалот (Kashalot, cachalot)	Uniform		2	
09774 Аксон (Akson)	Yankee Pod		1	
09774	Yankee Stretch		1	
09780 Аксон-2 (Akson-2)	Yankee Big Nose		1	
20120 Сарган (Sargan or Sarov)	Sarov		1	

== See also ==
- List of Russian naval engineers

== Footnotes ==
- Showell, Jak M. U-Boat Century, German Submarine Warfare 1906-2006. Chatham Publishing, Great Britain (2006). ISBN 1861-7624-10.
