= List of ships of Russia by project number =

The list of ships of Russia by project number includes all Soviet and Russian ships by known assigned project numbers. Ship descriptions are Russian assigned classifications when known. The Russian term проект (tr. proyekt) can be translated either as the cognate "project" or as "design". Warsaw Pact states and Post-Soviet states also used an equivalent term to classify their ships, such as the Polish Project 664 torpedo boat or the Ukrainian Project 58155 Hyurza-M armoured gunboat.

Project Number		Ship Type	Name		Year of Design	Displacement (t)	Number Built		Notes
	Subtypes		Common or NATO	Russian			Total		
1		Destroyer Leader	Leningrad-class		1930	2675	3		Originally assigned Project 2.
2		Guard Ship	Uragan-class		1926	633	8		Uragan-class Series I. Originally assigned Project 1 but poor test results led to its number being swapped with the Leningrad-class.
3		Minesweeper	Fugas-class		1930				Fugas-class Series I.
4		Guard Ship	Uragan-class		1931	619	4		Uragan-class Series II.
5		Cargo Lighter	Toplivo-1-class		1957	445			Imported from Poland.
6		Submarine	Dekabrist-class		1926	1388	6		Series I submarine.
7	7	Destroyer	Gnevnyy-class		1934	2400	47	29	Based on Italian Maestrale-class Destroyer.
7	7U	Destroyer	Storozhevoy-class		1938	2400	47	18	Gnevny-class destroyer with machinery en echelon. U stands for Uluchshennyy (Russian: Улучшенный, improved).
9		Submarine	S-class		1934	1075	3		Series IX submarine.
15		Destroyer	Orfey-class		1933-1944	1515-2020			Modernization of Orfey and Leytenant Il'in-class destroyers.
19		Guard Ship	Kirov-class		1933	1161	2		Built in Italy.
20	20	Destroyer Leader	Tashkent-class		1936	4175	1	0	2 planned, cancelled 1940 due to inability to locally construct design.
20	20I	Destroyer Leader	Tashkent-class		1936	4175	1	1	Built in Italy. I stands for either Importnye (Russian: импортные, imported) or Italyanskiy (Russian: итальянский, Italian).
21		Battleship	"Battleship B"		1936	37 800	0		Design study for Nelson-class style battleship, replaced by Project 25.
22		Heavy Cruiser			1938	23 000	0		Design study for "cruiser-killer" design, cancelled 1938.
23	23	Battleship	Sovetsky Soyuz-class		1939	65 150	0	0	4 laid down, 1 cancelled 1940, others 1947. Largest Russian battleships ever laid down.
23	23bis	Battleship	Sovetsky Soyuz-class		1939	66 800	0	0	Design study for improved Project 23, uses simplified armour scheme.
23	23NU	Battleship	Sovetsky Soyuz-class		1940	68 000-70 600	0	0	Design studies based on Project 23bis, all found too heavy and cancelled 1940.
24		Battleship			1950	81 150	0		2 planned for 1955, still in design phase and cancelled after Stalin's death.
25		Battleship	"Battleship B"		1937	30 900	0		Design study for small battleship, cancelled 1937.
26	26	Cruiser	Kirov-class		1934	9436	6	2	Based on Italian Condottieri-class.
26	26bis	Cruiser	Maxim Gorky-class		1937	9728	6	2	Improved Kirov-class.
26	26bis2	Cruiser	Maxim Gorky-class		1937	10 040	6	2	Project 26bis built for the Pacific Fleet. Less emphasis on saving weight.
27		Battlecruiser	Petropavlovsk				0		Proposal to rebuild the destroyed battleship Petropavlovsk (ex-Marat). Really a coastal bombardment ship.
28		Cruiser				10 390	0		Design study, precursor to Chapayev-class.
29	29	Guard Ship	Yastreb-class		1938	995	7	2	15 ships laid down, 9 cancelled/destroyed during construction, 2 completed, rest completed as Project 29K.
29	29K	Guard Ship	Yastreb-class				7	4	K stands for Korektirovannyy (Russian: Коректированный, Corrected).
30	30	Destroyer	Ognevoy-class		1939	2763	81	1	26 ships laid down, 15 cancelled, 1 completed, rest completed as Project 30K.
30	30A	Destroyer	Ognevoy-class		1940		81	0	Ognevoy-class using American Westinghouse high-pressure boilers, imported boilers were lost during the early weeks of the German invasion.
30	30K	Destroyer	Ognevoy-class		1947	2860	81	10	K stands for Korektirovannyy (Russian: Коректированный, Corrected).
30	30bis	Destroyer	Skoryy-class		1949	3066	81	70	Improved Project 30K.
30	30BA	Destroyer	Skoryy-class				81	2	Modernization for export to Egypt.
30	30BK	Destroyer	Skoryy-class				81	7	Modernization for export to Indonesia.
30	30BV	Destroyer	Skoryy-class				81	2	Modernization of ships returned from Egypt.
30	30T	Destroyer	Skoryy-class				81	1	Modernization of Pylkiy for export to Indonesia.
31		Radar Picket Destroyer	Skoryy-class		1955	3250	8		Conversion of Skoryy-class destroyers.
32	32	Salvage Ship	Soobrazitelnyy			2279	2	1	Conversion of destroyer Soobrazitelnyy.
32	32A	Salvage Ship	Strogyy				2	1	Conversion of destroyer Strogyy.
33		Guided Missile Cruiser	Voroshilov				1		Conversion of Maxim Gorky-class cruiser Voroshilov.
34		Radar Picket Destroyer					0		Based on Skoryy-class.
35		Destroyer	Udaloy-class		1940	3130	0		2 ships planned for 1941 but cancelled.
35	35	ASW Guard ship	Mirka-class			1136	18	18	
35	35M	ASW Guard ship	Mirka-class				18	10	Modernization of Mirka-class.
38	38	Destroyer Leader	Minsk-class		1934	2675	3	1	Improved Leningrad-class.
38	38bis	Destroyer Leader	Minsk-class			2675	3	2	
39		Guard Ship	Uragan-class		1934	635	6		Uragan-class Series III and IV.
40		Coastal Submarine	M-class		1934	256			Series XII submarine.
40		Destroyer			1944	4050	0		Design study for new destroyer with dual-purpose main guns, cancelled 1945.
41		Cruiser Submarine	K-class		1936	2104	11		Series XIV submarine. 12 ships laid down, 1 cancelled.
41		Destroyer	Tallinn-class	Neustrashimy		3830	1		
42		Guard ship	Kola-class	Sokol		1679	8		
43		Guard Ship	Brilliant-class		1934	580	4		Based on Fugas-class.
45		Destroyer	Opytnyy				1		Experimental destroyer with high-pressure boilers.
47		Destroyer				4500	0		
48	48	Destroyer Leader	Kiev-class		1939	3045	0	0	3 laid down, 1 cancelled 1940, remaining 2 converted to Project 48K.
48	48K	Destroyer Leader	Kiev-class		1948	2722 (std)	0	0	Cancelled 1950.
50		Guard ship	Riga-class	Gornostay		1337	68		
52	52	Guard Ship	Purga-class						
52	52K	Guard Ship	Purga-class			3819		1	K stands for Korektirovannyy (Russian: Коректированный, Corrected).
53		Cargo Ship	Severmorput-1-class		~1937	7330	2		
53	53	Minesweeper	Fugas-class						Fugas-class Series II
53	53U	Minesweeper	Fugas-class						Fugas-class Series III. U stands for Uluchshennyy (Russian: Улучшенный, improved).
56	56	Destroyer	Kotlin-class	Spokoinyy		3230	31	27	
56	56A	Guided Missile Destroyer	Kotlin-class	Spokoinyy		3230	31	7	Missile destroyer conversion of Kotlin-class.
56	56AE	Guided Missile Destroyer	Kotlin-class	Spokoinyy		3230	31	1	Conversion of Spravedlivy.
56	56K	Guided Missile Destroyer	Kotlin-class	Spokoinyy		3230	31	1	Conversion of Bravyy.
56	56PLO	Destroyer	Kotlin-class	Spokoinyy		3230	31	14	Modernization of Kotlin-class.
56	56M	Guided Missile Destroyer	Kildin-class	Bedovyy		3315	31	3	Dedicated missile destroyer (Kotlin-class conversions retained bow main gun) based on Kotlin-class.
56	56EM	Guided Missile Destroyer	Kildin-class	Bedovyy		3315	31	1	
56	56U	Guided Missile Destroyer	Kildin-class	Bedovyy		3315	31	3	Extensive modernization of Kildin-class.
57	57	Guided Missile Destroyer	Krupny-class	Gnevnyy	1956		9	0	Similar to Kildin-class, rejected and heavily redesigned to Project 57bis.
57	57bis	Guided Missile Destroyer	Krupny-class	Gnevnyy		4192	9	9	
57	57A	ASW Missile Destroyer	Kanin-class	Gnevnyy		4500	9	8	Modernization of Krupny-class, replaced SSM with SAM and converted to ASW role.
58		Minesweeper	Fugas-class						Fugas-class Series IV.
58		Guided Missile Cruiser	Kynda-class	Groznyy	1956		4		
59		Minesweeper	Vladimir Polukhin-class		1938	879	2		22 ships laid down, 3 cancelled, 2 completed, rest completed as Project 73K.
60		Minesweeper					0		
61		Gunboat			1939		0		
61	61	ASW Destroyer	Kashin-class	Komsomolets Ukrainy		4390	25	19	
61	61M	ASW Destroyer	Kashin-class				25	1	
61	61ME	ASW Destroyer	Kashin-class			4510	25	5	
61		Radar Picket					0		3 laid down, cancelled.
63		Nuclear Guided Missile Cruiser			1956		0		Based on Sverdlov-class.
64		Battleship			1937	53 000	0		Design study, cancelled 1938. Precursor to the Kronshtadt-class battlecruisers.
65		Light Cruiser			1951	11 600	0		Light cruiser design based on the Chapayev-Class. Precursor to the Sverdlov-class.
66		Heavy Cruiser			1953	30 850	0		Cruiser-killer design similar to the Stalingrad-class battlecruisers, construction of lead ship planned for 1953-1956, cancelled 1954.
67	67	Guided Missile Cruiser					1	0	Conversion proposal for Sverdlov-class cruisers.
67	67EP	Guided Missile Cruiser					1	1	Modernization of Admiral Nakhimov after its conversion to Project 68E.
68	68	Cruiser	Chapayev-class		1939	13 420	19	0	7 ships laid down, 1 converted to Project 68S, 2 cancelled and remaining completed as Project 68K.
68	68I	Cruiser	Chapayev-class		1940	14 460	19	0	Project 68 redesigned to fit imported German fire control systems and 15 cm guns, cancelled 1940. I stands for either Importnye (Russian: импортные, imported) or Inostrannyy (Russian: иностранный, foreign).
68	68S	Cruiser	Chapayev-class		1941		19	0	Chkalov redesigned to fit imported German heavy AA guns, cancelled 1941 after German invasion, completed as Project 68K.
68	68K	Cruiser	Chapayev-class				19	5	K stands for Korektirovannyy (Russian: Коректированный, Corrected).
68	68bis	Cruiser	Sverdlov-class		1952		19	14	Improved Project 68K.
68	68bis-ZIF	Cruiser	Sverdlov-class				19	0	Project 68bis with improved AA. 9 laid down, cancelled ~1955.
68	68A	Cruiser	Sverdlov-class		~1973		19	4	Modernization of Sverdlov-class with improved AA.
68	68E	Cruiser	Sverdlov-class		1954		19	1	Guided missile cruiser conversion of Admiral Nakhimov.
68	68U1	Cruiser	Sverdlov-class		1965		19	1	Command ship conversion of Zhdanov.
68	68U2	Cruiser	Sverdlov-class				19	1	Command ship conversion of Admiral Senyavin.
69	69	Battlecruiser	Kronshtadt-class		1940	41 539	0		Officially "Heavy Cruisers". 2 ships laid down, converted to Project 69I.
69	69I	Battlecruiser	Kronshtadt-class		1941	36 250 (std)	0		Project 69 with imported German 38 cm guns, work halted 1941 and cancelled 1947. I stands for Importnye (Russian: импортные, imported, as in imported guns).
69	69AV	Aircraft Carrier	Kronshtadt-class				0		Proposal to convert the unfinished Kronshtadt-class battlecruisers to aircraft carriers.
70	70	Anti-aircraft Cruiser	Sverdlov-class		1957		1	0	Conversion proposal for Sverdlov-class cruisers.
70	70E	Anti-aircraft Cruiser	Sverdlov-class		1958		1	1	Conversion of Dzerzhinsky with Volkhov SAM system.
71		Guided Missile Cruiser					0		Proposal to refit Sverdlov-class cruisers with SAMs.
71	71A	Aircraft Carrier			1939	11 300	0	0	Design study for an aircraft carrier based on the Chapayev-class. Cancelled 1940.
71	71B	Aircraft Carrier			1939	30 600	0	0	Design study for an aircraft carrier based on the Kronshtadt-class, Cancelled 1939.
72		Aircraft Carrier			1945	28 880	0		Design study, cancelled 1945.
73	73	Minesweeper	Vladimir Polukhin-class		1942		15	0	Project 59 with diesel engines instead of steam turbines.
73	73K	Minesweeper	Vladimir Polukhin-class		1945	880	15	15	Project 73 with more powerful armament and sonars. K stands for Korektirovannyy (Russian: Коректированный, Corrected).
78		Training Cruiser	Svetlana-class		1939		0		Proposal to complete Admiral Butakov as a training cruiser, cancelled 1941.
78		Patrol Boat	A-class		1941	8			Civilian service boat, many converted to combat roles during construction.
80		Landing Craft					26		
82		Battlecruiser	Stalingrad-class			42 300	0		3 laid down, cancelled after Stalin's death.
83	83	Heavy Cruiser	Admiral Hipper-class		1936	18 200	0	0	Ex-German heavy cruiser Lützow, never completed and used as a floating barracks.
83	83K	Heavy Cruiser	Admiral Hipper-class				0	0	Proposed completion of Tallinn (ex-Lützow) using the captured Seydlitz with Soviet weaponry.
92		Oil Tanker	Pevek-class			6360	1		Imported from Finland.
94		Cruiser			1940	8715	0		Design study development of Maxim Gorky-class cruiser.
95		Coastal Submarine	M-401		1939	140	1		Experimental submarine with closed-cycle diesel engines.
96	96	Coastal Submarine	M-class		1939	358	57	57	Series XV submarine.
96	96M	Coastal Submarine	M-class				57	0	Series XV submarine.
97		Submarine	S-class		1940	1106	0		Series XVI submarine. 11 planned, 5 laid down, all cancelled 1941.
97	97	Icebreaker	Ivan Susanin-class			2964	16	3	
97	97K	Icebreaker	Ivan Susanin-class			2599	16	2	
97	97AP	Icebreaker	Ivan Susanin-class			3414	16	2	
97	97P	Icebreaker Patrol Ship	Ivan Susanin-class			3525	16	8	
97	97B	Hydrographic Survey Ship	Ivan Susanin-class			3450	16	1	
99		Submarine Minelayer			1941	1580	0		Work stopped 1941.
101		Passenger Ship				5640	1		Imported from East Germany.
102		Degaussing Ship							
103		Motor Torpedo Boat	SM-4		1939	42	1		
106		Landing Craft	Vydra-class						
116		Motor Torpedo Boat	G-5-class			17	47		G-5 Series XII and XIII.
122	122	Submarine Chaser	Artillerist-class		1939	238	149	6	10 laid down, 4 cancelled 1941.
122	122a	Submarine Chaser	Artillerist-class		1941	257	149	16	
122	122bis	Submarine Chaser	Kronshtadt-class		1944	325	149	227	
123	123	Motor Torpedo Boat		Komsomolets	1939	17	337	1	
123	123bis	Motor Torpedo Boat	P-4-class	Komsomolets	1943	21	337	89	Improved Project 123, uses American Packard engines.
123	M123bis	Motor Torpedo Boat	P-4-class	Komsomolets		22	337	42	Project 123bis using Soviet engines.
123	123K	Motor Torpedo Boat	P-4-class	Komsomolets	1950	23	337	205	Project M123bis with radar.
123	K123K	Motor Torpedo Boat	P-4-class	Komsomolets			337	6	Project 123K MTBs modified to have a forward hydrofoil.
123	123U	Target Boat	P-4-class	Komsomolets			337	8	Conversion to target boat.
125	125	Torpedo Boat				61	18	2	CODAG-powered hydrofoil.
125	125A	Patrol Boat			1962	65	18	16	Border patrol boat variant.
129		Steam Tug	Severoles-class		1933	145	92		
130		Degaussing Ship	Bereza-class			2096	17		Imported from Poland.
133		Patrol Boat	Muravey-class	Antares					
133.1	1331M	ASW Corvette	Parchim II-class			935	12		Imported from East Germany.
137		Floating Workshop				1298	1		
138		Armoured Motor Gunboat			1941	153			Cancelled 1941 due to lack of suitable engines, resumed development as Project 161 in 1942.
141		Buoy Tender	Kashtan-class				8		
145		Buoy Tender	Sura-class						
149		Netlayer	Onega-class		1938	527	8		12 laid down, 4 cancelled.
157		Motor Torpedo Boat	G-5-class				1		G-5 converted to use BS-2 torpedo drop collars, reconverted to a G-5 Series XI.
158		Motor Torpedo Boat			1942		0		Steel-hulled D-3-class MTB design.
159	159	ASW Guard ship	Petya-class			1050	56	19	
159	159A	ASW Guard ship	Petya-class			1110	56	23	Project 159 with second set of torpedo tubes.
159	159AE	ASW Guard ship	Petya-class			1140	56	14	Project 159 with larger torpedoes.
159	159M	ASW Guard ship	Petya-class				56	9	Modernization of Project 159.
160		Oil Tanker	Altay-class			7225	6		
161		Armoured Motor Gunboat			1942	158	20		Built in 2 series.
163		Motor Torpedo Boat	STK DD		1942	51	1		
164		Submarine Chaser	MO-class	MO-6	1940	66	4		Steel-hulled MO-4.
165		Landing Craft	DB-class		1942	19			
171		Motor Torpedo Hovercraft			1950	38	0		
174		Submarine Chaser	MO-class	MO-4		56			Wartime production MO-4 with American Packard engines.
183	183	Motor Torpedo Boat	P-6-class	Bolshevik				333	
183	183T	Motor Torpedo Boat	P-8-class	Bolshevik				1	CODAG-powered.
183	183TK	Motor Torpedo Boat	P-10-class	Bolshevik				25	Production Project 183T.
183	183R	Missile Boat	Komar-class		1957			114	Some converted from Project 183.
184		Motor Torpedo Boat				34	2		Design licensed to China and modified to become the Type 025/Huchuan-class.
186		Armoured Motor Gunboat			1944	164	37		Early boats fitted with T-34-85 turrets, later refitted with purpose-built MK-85 turrets.
190		Armoured Motor Gunboat			1949		0		Cancelled 1949.
191	191	Armoured Motor Gunboat			1946		189	1	
191	191M	Armoured Motor Gunboat			1947		189	188	Project 191 with stronger engines.
192		Armoured Motor Gunboat			~1950	65	2		Similar to Project 191.
194		Armoured Submarine Chaser	MO-class	BMO	1942	55	67		
199		Submarine Chaser				83	52		Sub chaser version of Project 183.
200	OD-200/P-26	Submarine Chaser			1942	~47	344	88	Wooden sub chaser.
200	OD-200bis	Submarine Chaser			1946	~47	344	63	OD-200 with improved armament and Soviet engines.
200	OM-200	Submarine Chaser			1942	~47	344	0	Metal sub chaser, cancelled due to thin steel shortage.
200	TD-200	Motor Torpedo Boat	P-2-class		1942	~47	344	1	Wooden torpedo boat.
200	TD-200bis	Motor Torpedo Boat	P-2-class		1947	~47	344	168	TD-200 using Soviet engines.
200	TM-200	Motor Torpedo Boat			1942	~47	344	24	Metal torpedo boat.
201	201	Submarine Chaser	SO-1-class				170	12	
201	201M	Submarine Chaser	SO-1-class			200	170	158	
201	201T	Submarine Chaser	SO-1-class			219	170	0	Project 201M with torpedoes.
204		ASW Corvette	Poti-class				66		
205	205	Missile Boat	Osa-class	Moskit					
205	205P	Patrol Boat	Stenka-class	Tarantul				114	
205	205T	Torpedo Boat				220		8	
206	206	Torpedo Boat	Shershen-class				132	80	
206	206M	Torpedo Boat	Turya-class	Shtorm			132	24	
206	206ME	Torpedo Boat	Turya-class	Shtorm			132	16	
206	206MR	Missile Boat	Matka-class	Vikhr			132	12	
213		Motor Torpedo Boat	G-5-class			18	14		G-5 Series XI bis. Fire support boat variant with M-8 rocket launchers.
234		Multipurpose Boat	UTK			200	0		1 laid down, engine issues prevented completion, cancelled 1951.
253	253L	Minesweeper	MT-class						
254		Minesweeper	T43-class						
257		Minesweeper	Vanya-class						
258	258	Radar Picket	T43-class						Conversion.
258	258M	Radar Picket	T43-class						Radar upgrade.
264		Radar Picket	T58-class						Conversion.
265		Minesweeper	Sasha-class						
266	266	Minesweeper	Yurka-class	Rubin					
266	266M	Minesweeper	Natya-class	Akvamarin					
266	266DB	Minesweeper	Natya-class	Akvamarin 2					
291		Armoured Motor Gunboat					0		
300		Floating Workshop	Oskol-class			2546	6		Imported from Poland.
301	301T	Floating Workshop	Oskol-class			2700	2		Imported from Poland.
303		Floating Workshop	Oskol-class			2700	4		Imported from Poland.
304	304	Floating Workshop	Amur-class				28		Imported from Poland.
304	304M	Floating Workshop	Amur-class				28		Amur-class with passenger facilities.
305		Powership	Tomba-class			5411	4		Imported from Poland.
307		Floating Battery					0		
310		Submarine Tender	Don-class	Batur					
311		Monitor				1100	0		
323		Floating Missile Base	Lama-class				7		
357		Dispatch Vessel	Libau-class						
376	376U	Training Ship	Yaroslavets-class						
394	394B	Surveillance Ship	Primor'ye-class						
411	411B	Dry Cargo Lighter							
431		Cargo Lighter							
437	437N	Oil Tanker	Khobi-class			1526	20		
438		Dry Cargo Barge				447	5		
503	503M	Surveillance Ship	Alpinist-class						
513	513M	Hydroacoustic Monitoring Ship	T43-class			570	17		
527	527N	Rescue Ship	Prut-class						
530		Salvage Ship	Nepa-class	Karpaty					
536		Research Ship	Pioner Moskvy-class						
537		Rescue Ship	Elbrus-class						
550		Polar Supply Ship	Amguema-class						
561		Water Tanker	Voda-class						
563	563	Tug	Goryn-class						
563	563S	Rescue Tug	Goryn-class						S stands for Spastel'niy (Russian: Спастельный, rescue).
577		Replenishment Ship	Uda-class						
593		Trials Ship	OS-248			1828	1		Converted from a passenger ship.
604		Submarine Minelayer	M-171		1942	258	1		Conversion of M-class Submarine M-171.
611	611	Submarine	Zulu-class			2348	26	22	
611	611AV	Submarine	Zulu-class			2400	26	4	
613		Submarine	Whiskey-class				215		
615		Coastal Submarine	Quebec-class				30		
617		Submarine	S-99				1		
627	627	Nuclear Submarine	November-class	Kit			13	1	
627	627A	Nuclear Submarine	November-class				13	12	
629	629	Ballistic Missile Submarine	Golf-class				23		
629	629M	Ballistic Missile Submarine	Golf-class				23		
633		Submarine	Romeo-class				133		
636		Submarine	Kilo-class	Varshavyanka					
640	640	Radar Picket Submarine	Whiskey Canvas Bag-class						
640	640T	Radar Picket Submarine	Whiskey Canvas Bag-class						
640	640U	Missile Submarine	Whiskey Twin Cylinder-class						
641	641	Submarine	Foxtrot-class				92	74	
641	641B	Submarine	Tango-class	Som			92	18	
644		Missile Submarine	Whiskey Twin Cylinder-class						
645		Nuclear Submarine	November-class				1		Project 627 with liquid metal reactor.
651		Cruise Missile Submarine	Juliett-class						
655		Cruise Missile Submarine	Whiskey Long Bin-class						
658	658	Nuclear Ballistic Missile Submarine	Hotel-class						
658	658M	Nuclear Ballistic Missile Submarine	Hotel-class						
659	659	Nuclear Cruise Missile Submarine	Echo-class						
659	659T	Nuclear Submarine	Echo-class						
661		Nuclear Cruise Missile Submarine	Papa-class	Anchar					
664		Nuclear Submarine Minelayer					0		
665		Submarine	Whiskey-class						
667	667A	Nuclear Ballistic Missile Submarine	Yankee-class	Navaga					
667	667AM	Nuclear Ballistic Missile Submarine	Yankee-class	Navaga-M					
667	667AU	Nuclear Ballistic Missile Submarine	Yankee-class	Nalim					
667	667AT	Nuclear Submarine	Yankee-class	Grusha					
667	667M	Nuclear Cruise Missile Submarine	Yankee-class	Andromeda					
667	667B	Nuclear Ballistic Missile Submarine	Delta-class	Murena					
667	667BD	Nuclear Ballistic Missile Submarine	Delta-class	Murena-M					
667	667BDR	Nuclear Ballistic Missile Submarine	Delta-class	Kalmar					
667	667BDRM	Nuclear Ballistic Missile Submarine	Delta-class	Delfin					
670	670A	Nuclear Cruise Missile Submarine	Charlie-class	Skat					
670	670M	Nuclear Cruise Missile Submarine	Charlie-class	Chayka					
671	671	Nuclear Submarine	Victor-class	Yersh					
671	671RT	Nuclear Submarine	Victor-class	Semga					
671	671RTM	Nuclear Submarine	Victor-class	Shchuka					
675		Nuclear Cruise Missile Submarine	Echo-class						
677		Submarine	St Petersburg-class	Lada			2		
685		Nuclear Submarine	Mike-class	Plavnik			1		
690		Submarine	Bravo-class	Kefal					
699		Minesweeper	Vanya-class						
701		Nuclear Ballistic Missile Submarine	Hotel-class						
705		Nuclear Submarine	Alfa-class	Lira					
712		Rescue Tug	Sliva-class						
717		Nuclear Amphibious Assault Submarine			1970		0		
730		Tug	Roslavl-class						
733	733	Tug	Okhtenskiy-class						
733	733S	Rescue Tug	Goliat-class						S stands for Spastel'niy (Russian: Спастельный, rescue).
740		Cargo Ship	Yunnyy Partizan-class						
745		Tug	Sorum-class						
748		Nuclear Amphibious Assault Submarine					0		
770	770D	Landing Ship	Polnocny-A-class			751	35	6	Imported from Poland.
770	770M	Landing Ship	Polnocny-A-class				35	4	Imported from Poland.
770	770MA	Landing Ship	Polnocny-A-class			820	35	21	Imported from Poland.
770	770T	Landing Ship	Polnocny-A-class				35	4	Imported from Poland.
771	771	Landing Ship	Polnocny-B-class			847	25	13	Imported from Poland.
771	771A	Landing Ship	Polnocny-B-class			857	25	12	Imported from Poland.
772	772U	Training Boat	Bryza-class						
773	773	Landing Ship	Polnocny-C-class			1192		8	Imported from Poland.
773	773U	Landing Ship	Polnocny-C-class						
775	775	Landing Ship	Ropucha-class			4012	28	12	Imported from Poland.
775	775/II	Landing Ship	Ropucha-class				28	13	Imported from Poland.
775	775/III	Landing Ship	Ropucha-class				28	3	Imported from Poland.
776		Landing Command Ship							
782		Floating Dry Dock							
823		Floating Dry Dock							
850		Research Ship	Nikolay Zubov-class			3090	11		Imported from Poland.
860		Hydrographic Survey Ship	Samara-class	Azimut					
861	861	Hydrographic Survey Ship	Moma-class						
861	861M	Surveillance Ship	Moma-class						
862	862	Research Ship	Yug-class						
862	8621	Surveillance Ship	Yug-class						
862	8622	Surveillance Ship	Yug-class						
864		Surveillance Ship	Vishnaya-class						
865		Midget Submarine	Losos-class	Pyranja					
870		Hydrographic Survey Ship	Kamenka-class						
871		Hydrographic Survey Ship	Biya-class						
872		Hydrographic Survey Ship	Finik-class						
873		Hydrographic Survey Ship	Sibiryakov-class						
877		Submarine	Kilo-class	Paltus					
885		Nuclear Submarine	Severodvinsk-class	Yasen					
887		Training Ship	Smolnyy-class			7256	3		Imported from Poland.
888	888R	Training Ship	Wodnik II-class	Labadzh		1848	2		Imported from Poland.
903		Missile Ground Effect Vehicle	Utka-class	Lun			1		
935		Nuclear Ballistic Missile Submarine	Borei-class				1		
940		Rescue Submarine	India-class	Lenok					
941		Nuclear Ballistic Missile Submarine	Typhoon-class	Akula			6		
945	945A	Nuclear Submarine	Sierra-class	Barrakuda					
945	945B	Nuclear Submarine	Sierra-class	Kondor					
949	949	Nuclear Cruise Missile Submarine	Oscar-class	Granit					
949	949A	Nuclear Cruise Missile Submarine	Oscar-class	Antei					
955	955	Nuclear Ballistic Missile Submarine	Borei-class				7		
955	955A	Nuclear Ballistic Missile Submarine	Borei-class				7		
956	956	Guided Missile Destroyer	Sovremenny-class	Sarych		7910	21	17	
956	956E	Guided Missile Destroyer	Sovremenny-class			8440	21	2	For export to China.
956	956EM	Guided Missile Destroyer	Sovremenny-class				21	2	For export to China.
959		Radar Picket	T58-class	Oko			0		
962		Radar Picket					0		
971	971	Nuclear Submarine	Akula-class	Bars					
971	971U	Nuclear Submarine	Akula-class	Shchuka-B					
977	9770	Nuclear Submarine	Yankee Pod-class	Akson					
978	9780	Nuclear Submarine	Yankee Stretch-class						
996		Radar Picket Destroyer					0		Proposed conversion of Sovremenny-class.
1041	10410	Patrol Boat	Svetlyak-class						
1041	10411	Missile Boat	Svetlyak-class						
1041	10412	Patrol Boat	Svetlyak-class						Export variant.
1058	10581	Hybrid Battleship	"Ship X"		1938	74 000	0		Designed by Gibbs & Cox. Also offered to US Navy.
1075		Minesweeper	Lida-class						
1080		Guided Missile Cruiser							
1083	10831	Submarine	Paltus-class						
1090	10901	Battleship	"Design D"		1939	53 680	0		Designed by Gibbs & Cox.
1112		Cable Ship	Klazma-class						
1123	1123	Aviation cruiser	Moskva-class	Kondor		15280	2	2	Officially an "Anti-submarine Cruiser".
1123	11233	Aviation cruiser	Moskva-class	Kondor			2	0	Design with increased armament.
1124		Armoured Motor Gunboat			1935-1943	41-48			2 production series. Technically Project 11-24 as "11" replaced the TsKB-50 design bureau designation of "SB".
1124	1124	ASW Corvette	Grisha-class	Al'batros				38	
1124	1124K	ASW Corvette	Grisha-class	Al'batros				1	Modernization of MPK-104.
1124	1124P	Patrol Boat	Grisha-class					17	
1124	1124M	ASW Corvette	Grisha-class					31	
1124	11244	ASW Corvette	Grisha-class						
1125		Armoured Motor Gunboat				27-37	211		2 production series. Technically Project 11-25 as "11" replaced the TsKB-50 design bureau designation of "SB".
1134	1134	Guided Missile Cruiser	Kresta I-class	Berkut		7170		4	
1134	1134A	ASW Destroyer	Kresta II-class	Berkut-A		7535		10	
1134	1134B	ASW Destroyer	Kara-class	Berkut-B		9700		7	
1135	1135	Guard ship	Krivak-class	Burevestnik		3190	50		
1135	1135M	Guard ship	Krivak-class	Burevestnik-M			50	11	
1135	11351	Guard ship	Krivak-class	Nerey			50	8	
1135	11352	Guard ship	Krivak-class	Burevestnik			50		
1135	11353	Guard ship	Krivak-class	Burevestnik			50		
1135	11356R	Frigate	Admiral Grigorovich-class			4035	50	10	
1141		Submarine Chaser	Babochka-class	Sokol		465	1		
1143	1143	Aircraft Carrier	Kiev-class	Krechet		41370	4	2	Officially a "Heavy Aircraft-carrying Cruiser".
1143	1143M	Aircraft Carrier	Kiev-class	Krechet		43220	4	1	
1143	11430E	Nuclear Aircraft Carrier	Lamantin-class				4	0	
1143	11435	Aircraft Carrier	Kuznetsov-class			58600	4	1	Officially a "Heavy Aircraft-carrying Cruiser".
1143	11436	Aircraft Carrier	Kuznetsov-class				4	0	Incomplete hulk sold to China and completed as Liaoning.
1143	11437	Nuclear Aircraft Carrier	Ulyanovsk-class			73400	4	0	Officially a "Heavy Nuclear-powered Aircraft-carrying Cruiser". 1 laid down, cancelled 1992.
1144	1144	Guided Missile Battlecruiser	Kirov-class	Orlan		25860	4	1	Officially a "Heavy Nuclear-powered Missile Cruiser".
1144	11442	Guided Missile Battlecruiser	Kirov-class	Orlan		26396	4	3	
1145	11451	Submarine Chaser	Mukha-class	Sokol 2		470	2		
1151	11510	Transport Ship	Belyanka-class						
1153		Nuclear Aircraft Carrier		Oryol	1978	72 000	0		
1154	11540	Guard ship	Neustrashimy-class	Yastreb		4400	2		
1155	1155	ASW Destroyer	Udaloy-class	Fregat					
1155	11551	ASW Destroyer	Udaloy-class	Fregat					
1157	11570	Munitions Transport Ship	Sadko-class						
1159		ASW Guard ship	Koni-class	Del'fin		1900	14		
1160		Nuclear Aircraft Carrier		Oryol	1969		0		
1164		Guided Missile Cruiser	Slava-class	Atlant		11280	3		
1166	11661	ASW Guard ship	Gepard-class			2200	6		
1171	1171	Landing Ship	Alligator-class	Tapir					
1171	11711	Landing Ship	Ivan Gren-class						
1171	1171E	Amphibious Assault Ship	Cayman-class						
1172		Cable Ship	Emba-class						
1174		Landing Ship	Ivan Rogov-class	Nosorog					
1175		Cable Ship	Biryusa-class						
1176		Landing Craft	Ondatra-class	Akula					
1177	11770	Landing Craft	Serna-class						
1178		Amphibious Assault Ship							
1190		Monitor	Khasan-class		1933		3		
1204		River Gunboat	Shmel-class						
1205		Air Cushion Landing Craft	Gus-class	Skat					
1206	1206	Air Cushion Landing Craft	Lebed-class	Kalmar					
1206	12061	Air Cushion Landing Craft	Tsaplya-class	Murena					
1206	1206E	Air Cushion Landing Craft	Tsaplya-class	Murena					
1206	1206T	Air Cushion Minelayer	Pelikan-class						
1208		River Gunboat	Yaz-class	Slepen					
1209		Air Cushion Landing Craft	Utenok-class	Omar					
1221	12210	Fuel Lighter							
1232	12321	Air Cushion Landing Craft	Aist-class	Dzheyran					
1232	12322	Air Cushion Landing Craft	Zubr-class						
1234	1234	Guided missile corvette	Nanuchka-class	Ovod		670			
1234	12341	Guided missile corvette	Nanuchka-class	Burun					
1234	12347	Guided missile corvette	Nanuchka-class	Nakat		730			
1236		Torpedo Testing Ship	Potok-class	Seman					
1238		Air Cushion Gunboat	Kasatka-class						
1239		Air Cushion Missile Boat	Dergach-class	Sivuch/Bora		~1050			
1240		Missile Boat	Sarancha-class	Uragan		320			
1241	1241	Missile Boat	Tarantul-class	Molniya		488			
1241	1241PE	Missile Boat	Tarantul-class	Molniya					
1241	12411RZ	Missile Boat	Tarantul-class	Molniya-M					
1241	12412	Submarine chaser	Pauk-class	Molniya 2		475			
1241	12412P	Submarine chaser	Pauk-class	Molniya 2					
1242	12421	Corvette	Tarantul-class	Molniya					
1248	1248	River Gunboat	Vosh-class	Moskit		213.7			
1248	12481	River Gunboat	Vosh-class	Moskit					Vosh-class without minelaying rails
1249		Patrol Boat	Pyavka-class						
1258		Minesweeper	Yevgenya-class						
1259		Minesweeper	Olya-class	Malakhit					
1265		Minesweeper	Alexandrit-class	Yakhont					
1266	12660	Minesweeper	Gorya-class						
1270	12700	Minesweeper	Alexandrit-class						
1274		Cable Ship/Minelayer	Klaszma-class						
1330									
1350		Fish Reefer Ship	Raduzhnyy-class						
1356	13560	Floating Dry Dock							
1360		Yacht	Chika-class						
1388	1388M	Officers' Yacht	Razvedchik-class						
1415	14151		Tanya-class						
1431	14310		Mirazh-class						
1452		Rescue Tug	Ingul-class						
1453		Rescue Tug	Ingul-class						
1454		Experimental Ship	Sorum-class						
1467	14670	Officers' Yacht							
1481		Fuel Lighter	Bis-class						
1501	15010	Fuel Lighter							
1541		Missile Fuel Tanker	Luza-class						
1545		Water Tanker	Baskunchak-class						
1549		Water Tanker	Manych-class						
1559	1559B	Replenishment Ship	Boris Chilikin-class						
1593		Replenishment Ship	Boris Chilikin-class						
1595		Cargo Ship	Neon Antonov-class						
1657	16570	Salvage Tug	Khoper-class						
1690	16900A	Cargo Lighter	Kanin-class						
1710		Submarine	Beluga-class	Makrel					
1760		Floating Dry Dock							
1780		Floating Dry Dock	Shilka-class						
1783	1783A	Waste Tanker	Vala-class						
1791		Transport Ship	Amga-class						
1799	1799	Degaussing Ship	Pelym-class						
1799	1799A	Degaussing Ship	Pelym-class						
1806		Hydroacoustic Monitoring Ship	Onega-class						
1823		Ammunition Ship	Muna-class						
1824		Testing Ship	Muna-class						
1826		Surveillance Ship	Balzam-class						
1828		Surveillance Ship	Yuriy Ivanov-class						
1840		Submarine	Lima-class						
1851		Submarine	Paltus-class						
1855		Deep-submergence rescue vehicle	Priz-class				4		
1859		Ammunition Ship	Berezina-class				1		
1886		Submarine Tender	Ugra-class						
1893		Fireboat	Katun-class						
1908		Satellite Tracking Ship	Akademik Sergey Korolyov-class				1		
1909		Satellite Tracking Ship	Kosmonavt Yuriy Gagarin-class				1		
1910		Submarine	Uniform-class	Kashalot					
1914	19141	Missile Tracking Ship	Marshal Nedelin-class						
1917		Satellite Tracking Ship	Kosmonaut Vladimir Komarov-class				1		
1918		Transport Ship	Vytegrales-class						
1941		Command Ship	Kapusta-class	Titan			1		
1993		Fireboat	Katun-class	Ikar					
2012	20120	Submarine	Sarov-class	Sargan					
2020		Nuclear Fuel Transport Ship	Malina-class						
2038	20380	Corvette	Steregushchy-class	(Korvet-1)		2200	10	8	4 under construction.
2038	20382	Corvette	Steregushchy-class	Tigr			10	0	Export variant.
2038	20385	Corvette	Gremyashchiy-class			2500	10	1	5 under construction.
2038	20386	Corvette	Derzky-class			~3400	10	1	1 under construction.
2091	20910	Air Cushion Ship	Chilim-class						
2127	21270	Officers' Yacht							
2163	21630	Monitor	Buyan-class			520	13	3	
2163	21631	Corvette	Buyan-class	Buyan-M		949	13	10	2 under construction.
2163	21632	Corvette	Buyan-class	Tornado			13	0	Export variant.
2163	21635	Corvette	Buyan-class	Sarsar			13	0	
2182	21820	Landing Craft	Dyugon-class			280	5		
2190	21900	Icebreaker	LK-16-class			14 300	5		1 under construction.
2195	21956	Guided Missile Destroyer			2007		0		
2198	21980	"Anti-saboteur Ship"	Grachonok-class			138	27		1 under construction
2212	22120	Icebreaker Patrol Boat	Purga-class			1066	8		1 under construction.
2216	22160	Patrol corvette	Project 22160	Vasiliy Bykov		~1700	4		1 under construction, 1 lost
2235	22350	Frigate	Admiral Gorshkov-class			5400	3		2 fitting out, 4 under construction.
2246	22460	Patrol Boat	Rubin-class	Okhotnik		630	14		
2280	22800	Guided missile corvette	Karakurt-class			860	9		7 under construction.
2300	23000E	Nuclear Aircraft Carrier	Shtorm-class		2013		0		
2313	23130	Replenishment Ship	Akademik Pashin-class				1		3 under construction.
2510	02510	Assault Boat	BK-16-class				30		
2356	23560	Nuclear Guided Missile Destroyer	Lider-class			19 000	0		
2390	23900	Amphibious Assault Ship	Ivan Rogov-class			40 000	0		2 under construction.
3160	03160	Patrol Boat/Assault Boat	Raptor-class				17		
A-202		Tug	Roslavl-class						
B-92		Tug	Neftegaz-class						
B-93		Research Ship	Akademik Fersman-class						
B-99		Rescue Tug	Iva-class	Vikhr					
B-320		Hospital Ship	Ob'-class						
P-19	P-19	Motor Torpedo Boat	D-3-class			36			
P-19	P-19-O	Submarine Chaser	D-3-class		1942				
P-19	P-19-OK	Submarine Chaser	D-3-class			40			
P-23		Motor Torpedo Boat	D-4-class		1940	~40	0		1 laid down, cancelled 1941.
SB-12		River Monitor	Udarnyy-class				1		Originally classified as a floating battery.
SB-15		Paddle Tug	Usyskin-class			400 (std)			
SB-16		Paddle Tug				355			
SB-30		River Monitor	Aktivny-class			314	1		
SB-37		River Monitor	Zheleznyakov-class			270	6		
SB-47		Paddle Tug				325			All-welded version of Project SB-16.
SB-48	48	Paddle Tug				410			
SB-48	48a	Paddle Tug				376			
SB-51		Paddle Tug				450			
SB-57		River Monitor	Shilka-class		1939	800	0		3 laid down, scuttled under construction in 1941.

== See also ==
- U.S. Navy SCB projects list
