= List of NATO reporting names for submarines =

NATO code names for Russian and Chinese submarines

NATO has a system of reporting names for non-Western submarines. During the Cold War, NATO introduced a system of internal code names for classes of Soviet and Chinese submarines. This served to provide standard names for vessels whose official Soviet or Chinese designations were not known. The system was influenced by a pre-existing, separate system for reporting non-Western aircraft.

Until the 1980s, reporting names for submarines were taken from the NATO spelling alphabet. Modifications of existing designs were given additional descriptive terms, such as "Whiskey Long Bin" (Whiskey class with an extended sail). From the 1980s onwards, new designs were given names which derived from Russian words, but were not the Soviet class names, such as attack submarine "Akula" ("Shark"). (Coincidentally "Akula" happened to be the Soviet name for a different ballistic missile submarine class, which NATO designated "Typhoon".)

The names for Chinese submarines are taken from Chinese dynasties.

== List of reporting names for Soviet/Russian vessels ==
The code names listed are followed by official Soviet Navy/Russian Navy designations.

=== Hunter/killer submarines ===
- Hunter/Killer Submarines - Diesel/Electric Propelled (Podvodnaya Lodka - PL)
  - "Zulu" (Project 611) 26 boats
  - "Whiskey" (Project 613)
  - "Quebec" (Project A615)
  - "Romeo" (Project 633)
  - "Foxtrot" (Project 641)
  - "Tango" (Project 641B - Som class)
  - "Kilo" (Project 877)
  - "Export Kilo"
  - "Improved Kilo" (Project 636)
  - "Petersburg" (Project 677, Lada)
- Hunter/Killer Submarines - Nuclear Propelled (Podvodnaya Lodka Atomnaya - PLA)
  - "November" (Project 627 - Kit (Кит) Class)
  - "Echo I" (Project 659T) (refitted from Project 659 boats)
  - "Victor"
    - "Victor-I" (Project 671 - Yorsh (Ёрш) Class)
    - "Victor-II" (Project 671RT - Syomga (Сёмга) Class)
    - "Victor-III" (Project 671RTM - Shchuka (Щука) Class)
  - "Alfa" (Project 705 - Lira (Лира) Class)
  - "Mike" (Project 685 - Plavnik (Плавник) Class)
  - "Sierra"
    - "Sierra-I" (Project 945 - Barrakuda (Барракуда) Class)
    - "Sierra-II" (Project 945A - Kondor (Кондор) Class)
  - "Akula"
    - "Akula-I" (Project 971 - Shchuka-B Class)
    - "Akula-II"
  - "Severodvinsk" (Project 885 - Yasen (Ясень) Class)

=== Ballistic missile submarines ===
- Ballistic Missile Submarines - Diesel/Electric Propelled (Podvodnaya Lodka Raketnaya Ballisticheskaya - PLRB)
  - "Zulu V" (Project AV-611) 5 boats
  - "Golf I" (Project 629) 22 boats
  - "Golf II" (Project 629A) 14 boats (refitted from Project 629 boats)
- Ballistic Missile Submarines - Nuclear Propelled (Podvodnaya Lodka Atomnaya Raketnaya Ballisticheskaya - PLARB)
  - "Hotel I" (Project 658) 8 boats
  - "Hotel II" (Project 658M) 7 boats (refitted from Project 658 boats)
  - "Yankee I" (Project 667A, Navaga) 34 boats
  - "Yankee II" (Project 667AM, Navaga-M) 1 boat (refitted from Project 667A)
  - "Delta I" (Project 667B, Murena) 18 boats
  - "Delta II" (Project 667BD, Murena-M) 4 boats
  - "Delta III" (Project 667BDR, Kalmar) 14 boats
  - "Delta IV" (Project 667BDRM, Delfin) 7 boats
  - "Typhoon" (Project 941, Akula) 6 boats
  - "Dolgorukiy I" (Project 955 Borei) 3 boats
  - "Dolgorukiy II" (Project 955A Borei-A) 1 boat, 4 under construction, 7 planned

=== Guided-missile submarines ===
- Guided-Missile Submarines - Diesel/Electric Propelled (Podvodnaya Lodka Raketnaya Krylataya - PLRK)
  - "Whiskey Twin Cylinder" (Project 644) (refitted from Project 613)
  - "Whiskey Long Bin" (Project 665) (refitted from Project 613)
  - "Juliett" (Project 651)
- Guided-Missile Submarines - Nuclear Propelled (Podvodnaya Lodka Atomnaya Raketnaya Krylataya - PLARK)
  - "Echo I" (Project 659) 5 boats
  - "Echo II" (Project 675) 29 boats
  - "Charlie-I" (Project 670)
  - "Charlie-II" (Project 670M)
  - "Papa" (Project 661, Anchar (Анчар)) 1 boat
  - "Yankee-Sidecar"(Project 667M/Andromeda-class) (refitted from Project 667A)
  - "Yankee-Notch"(Project 667AT/Grusha-class) (refitted from Project 667A)
  - "Oscar-I" (Project 949, Granit (Гранит)
  - "Oscar-II" (Project 949A, Antey (Антей))

=== Experimental, trial, and special-purpose submarines ===
- "Golf" (Project 629E) (refitted from 629A)
- "Bravo" (Project 690 - Kefal class)
- "India" (Project 940 - Lenok class)
- "Lima" (Project 1840)
- "Beluga" (Project 1710)

== List of People's Republic of China submarines ==
The NATO names for Chinese submarines are taken from Chinese dynasties.

- Nuclear-powered ballistic missile
  - "Xia" (Type 092)
  - "Jin" (Type 094)
- Nuclear-powered fleet
  - "Han" (Type 091)
  - "Shang" (Type 093)
- Conventionally-powered attack
  - "Ming" (Type 035)
  - "Song" (Type 039)
  - "Yuan" (Type 039A)
- Hybrid conventional/nuclear powered attack
  - "Zhou" (Type 041)
- Conventionally-powered ballistic missile
  - "Qing" (Type 032)

== See also ==
- NATO reporting name (for aircraft)

== Bibliography ==
- Friedman, Norman (1995). "Soviet Union 1947–1991: Russian Federation and Successor States 1991–". In Chumbley, Stephen (ed.). Conway's All the World's Fighting Ships, 1947–1995. Annapolis, Maryland: Naval Institute Press. pp. 337–426. ISBN 1-55750-132-7.
- Saunders, Stephen, ed. (2004). Jane's Fighting Ships 2004–2005. Coulsdon, UK: Jane's Information Group. ISBN 0-7106-2623-1.
