= M256 =

M256 may refer to:

- M256 (tank gun) smoothbore gun, the main armament of the M1 Abrams tank
- Mercedes-Benz M256 engine
- Soviet submarine M-256
