= Soviet World War II destroyers =

There were fourteen different classes of destroyers that were used by the Soviet Navy in World War II:

- Yakov Sverdlov class Destroyer
- Frunze class Destroyer
- Orfey class Destroyer
- Izijaslav class Destroyer
- Fidonisy class Destroyer
- Leningrad class Destroyer - 6 operational in July 1941
- Tashkent class Destroyer
- Type 7 class Destroyer - 28 operational in July 1941
- Type 7U class Destroyer - 18 operational in July 1941
- Opytny class Destroyer
- Ognevoy class Destroyer
- Town class Destroyer
- Regele Ferdinand class Destroyer

== Gallery ==
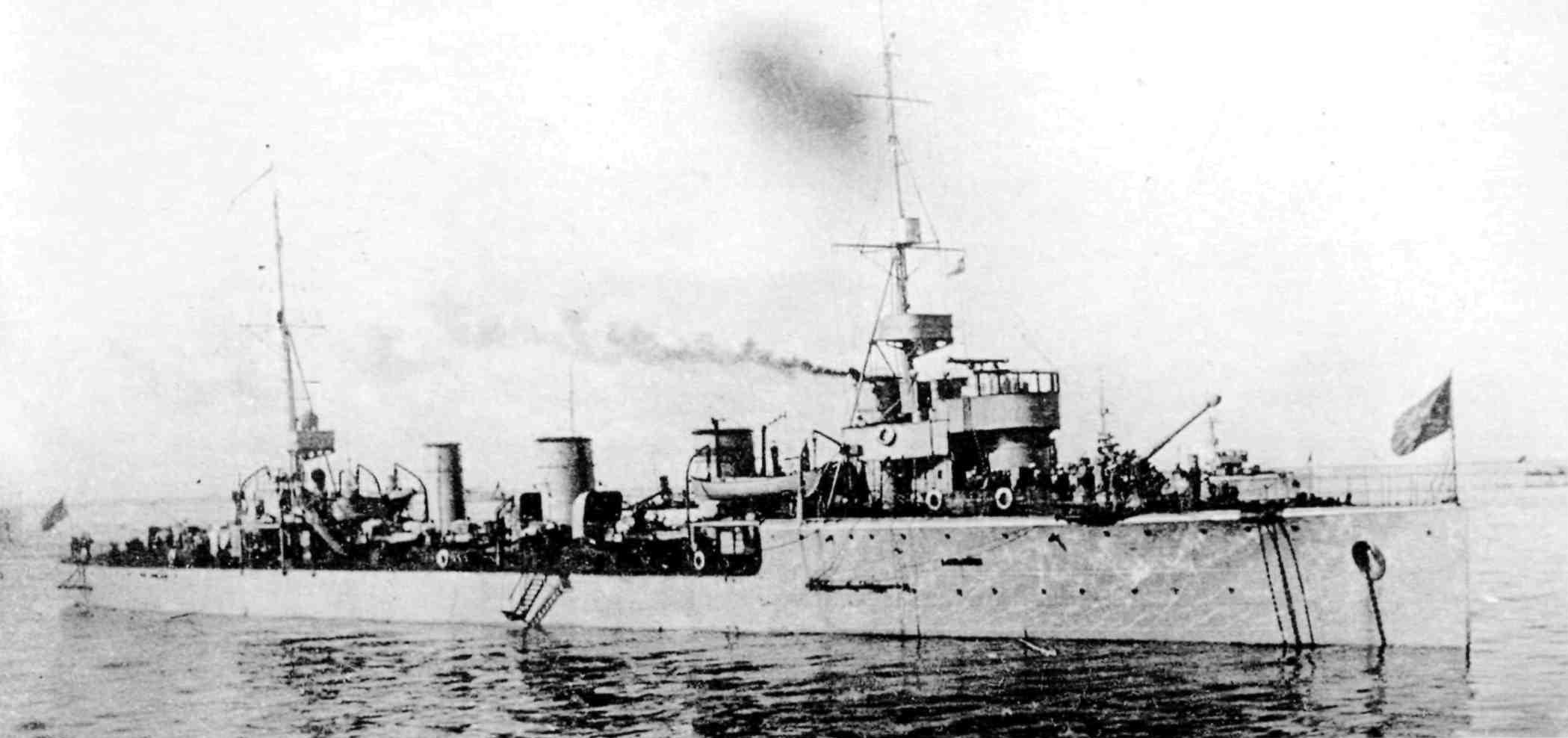
Yakov Sverdlov

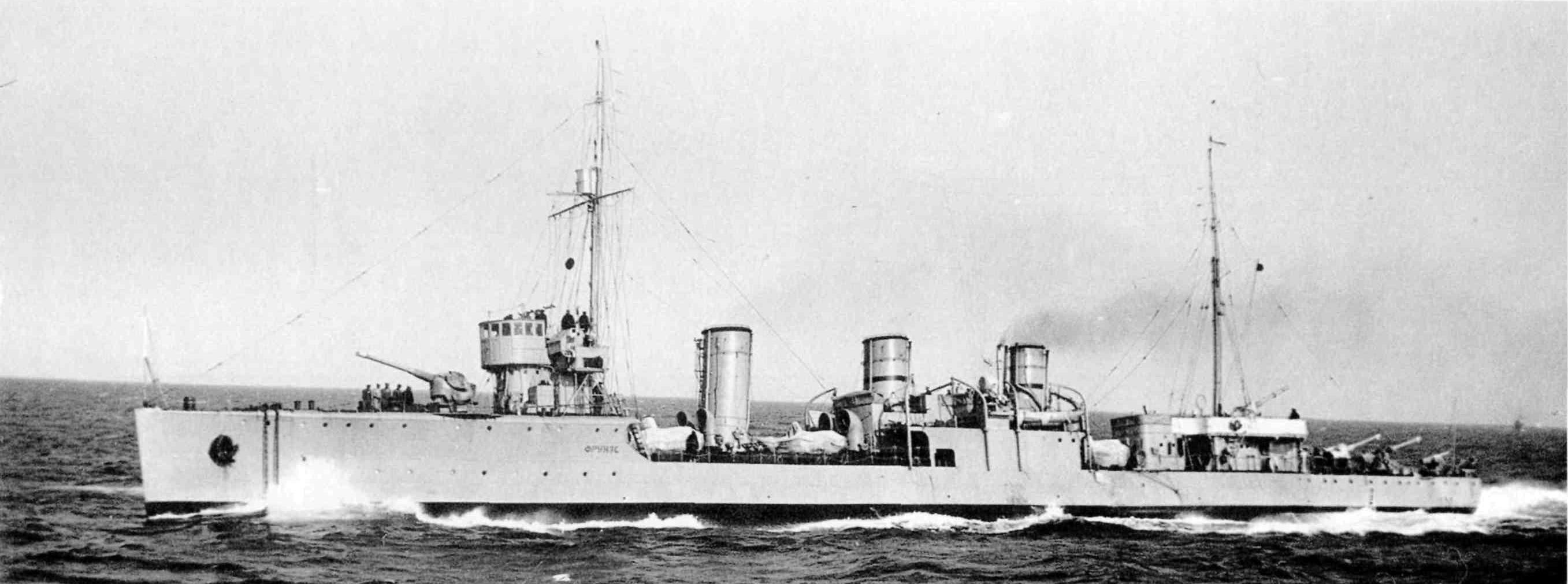
Derzky class or Bespokoiny class

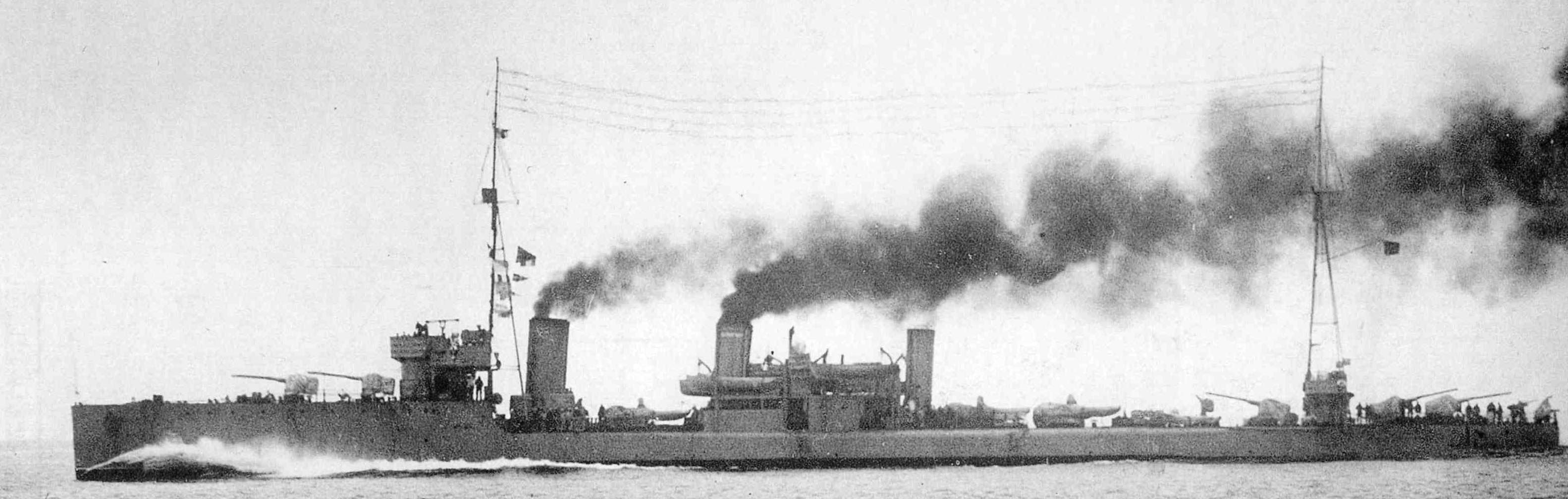
Izyaslav class

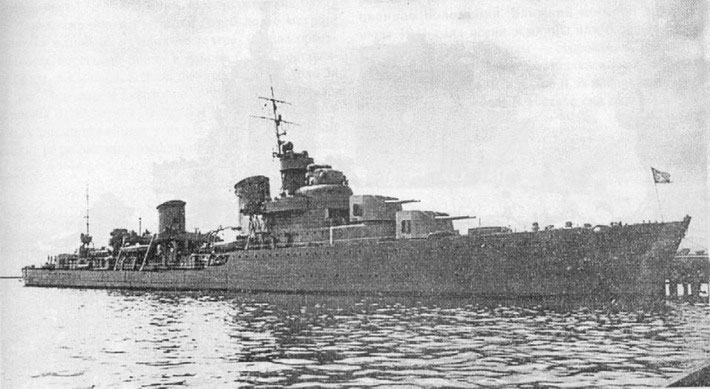
Project 20 Tashkent class

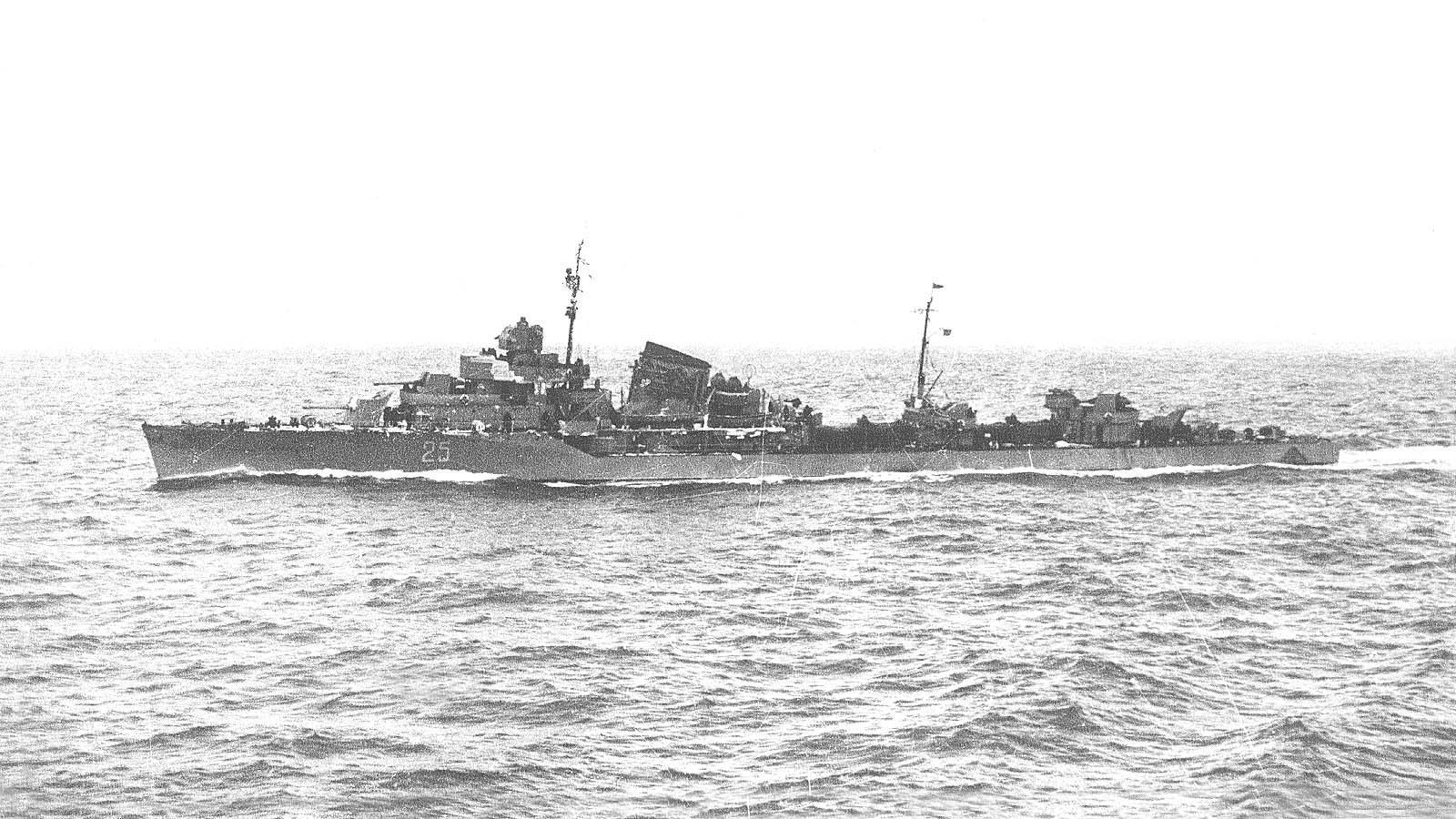
Project 7 Gnevny class

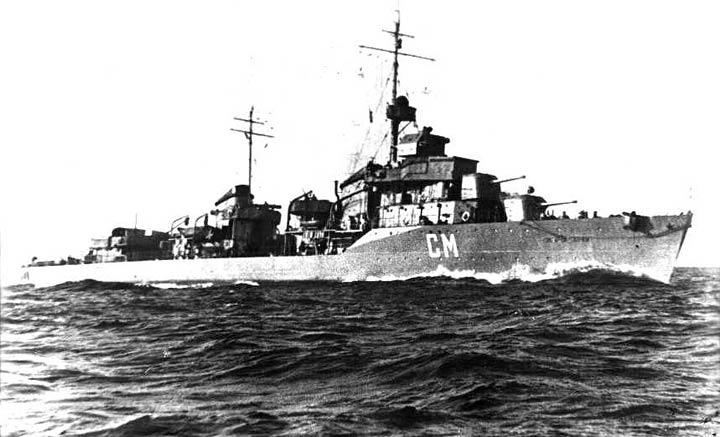
Project 7U Soobrazitelnyy class

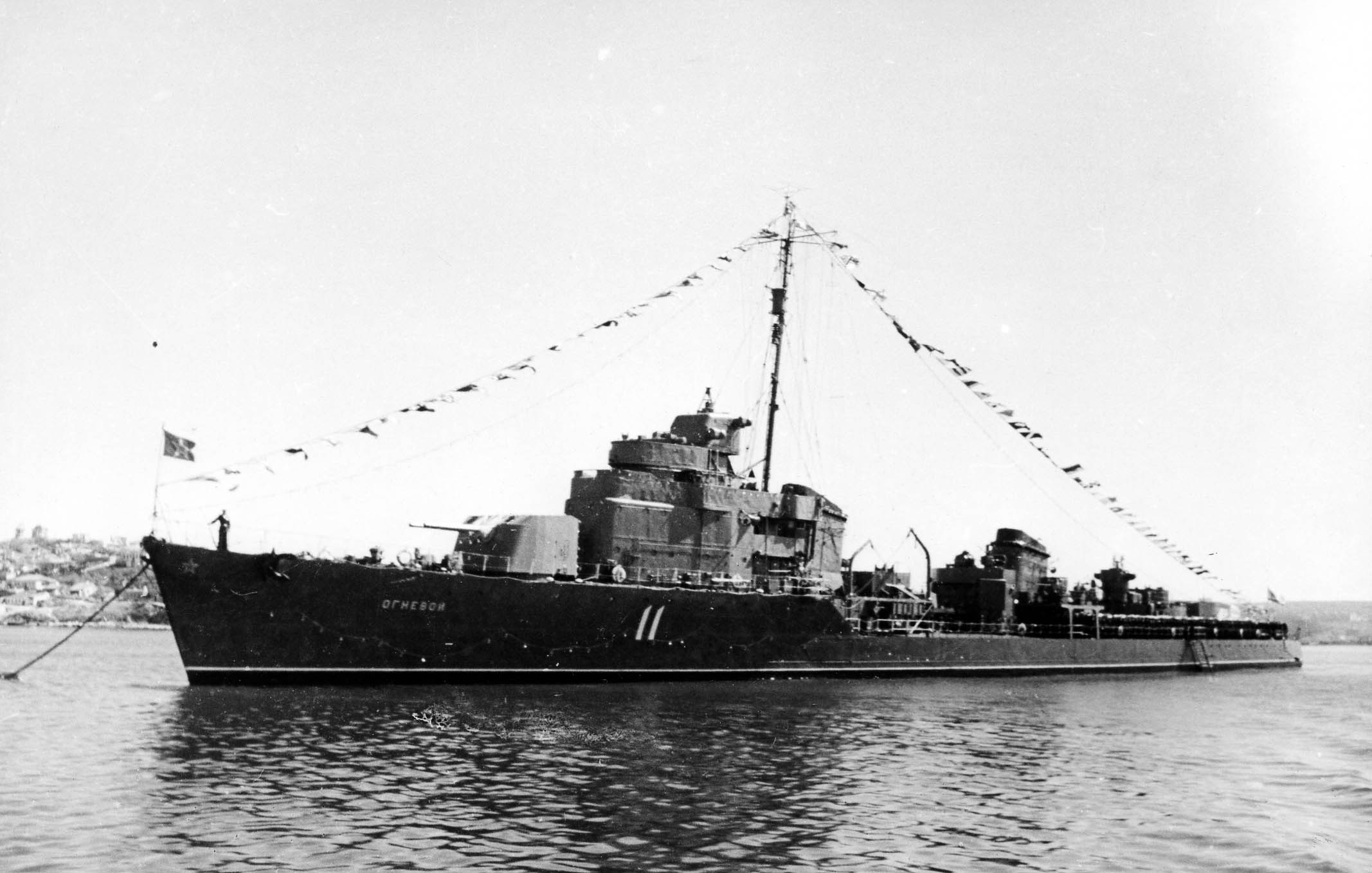
Project 30 Ognevoy class
