= AS-15 =

AS-15 may refer to:

- one of the two Kashalot-class submarines
- a Kh-55 missile
- the submarine tender USS Bushnell (AS-15)
