= Sibirykov-class research ship =

Russian ship class

Class overview
- Name: Sibirykov class
- Builders: Shipyards in Gdansk, Poland
- Operators: Russian Navy Russian Hydrographic Service
- Built: 1989–1990
- In service: 1990–present
- Completed: 2
- Active: 2

General characteristics
- Type: Research vessel
- Displacement: 2,280 t (2,240 long tons)
- Length: 85.6 m (281 ft)
- Beam: 15.2 m (50 ft)
- Draught: 5 metres (16 ft)
- Installed power: 1x4800 hp Zgoda-Sulzer 12АSB-25D diesel, 1 fixed pitch propeller, 1 bow thruster, 1 stern thruster, 2x800 kW diesel-generators, 1x380 kW diesel-generator
- Speed: 15 knots (28 km/h; 17 mph) (maximum)
- Range: 11,000 nautical miles (20,000 km; 13,000 mi)
- Endurance: 45 days
- Crew: unknown
- Armament: unknown

The Sibirykov class, better known by their Soviet designation Project 865 is class of Russian Hydrographic Survey vessels built in the Soviet Union. The class constists of 2 units: the Sibiryakov of the Baltic Fleet and the Romuald Muklevich of the Northern Fleet.

Most known is the Sibiryakov, used as a submarine escort ship by the Russian Navy. The ship was active in the sea area of the northern explosion site before the 2022 sabotage of the Nord Stream pipeline.

== Background and construction ==
The ships were built in the end days of Soviet Union. The Sibirykov class vessels were ordered for the exploration of mineral resources at depths of up to 6,000 meters. There is very little known about the construction in Gedansk, Poland.

The Russian Kronstadt Marine Plant, a subsidiary of the United Shipbuilding Corporation, USC reported 2016, that it is doing the dockside repair of the Project 865 Romuald Muklevich vessel. The ship was maintenanced and overhauled. According to the shipyard fault detection of the underwater section of the hull, surface skin replacement and weld overlaying were conducted. Concurrently, the shafting, variable-pitch propeller, bow and stern thrusters, anchorage apparatus, rudder, automatic devices, power supply system, deck, etc., were repaired by the yard. The repair of the vessel was scheduled to be completed in 2018.

== Capability ==
Both ships have an endurance on sea of 45 days and are capable of long, solitary missions.

Both ships could be equipped with a small special submarine of the Losos class, Project 865 Piranha. Each ships can carry up to two 18-ton submersibles. the ships are equipped with 14 laboratories plus hydrographic, meteorological, magnetometric, geologic, gravimetric, and photographic facilities.

Both ships have two Don navigation radars and a MR-212 Vaygach X-band maritime reconnaissance and navigation radar.

== Operations ==
Project 865 Sibiryakov was one of three Russian Navy ships which were detected 2022 in waters close to the site of the Nord Stream explosions in the months leading up to the pipeline sabotage.

Sibiryakov is believed to be capable of carrying out underwater surveillance, according to an investigation by public broadcasters in Norway, Sweden, Denmark and Finland.

An unidentified ship took off from Kaliningrad in June 2022 to the sea area of the later explosions. The ship had its AIS disabled. His position was reconstructed using recorded radio messages. It then returned to Kaliningrad. A few days later, the Sibiryakov reached the same area and also switched off the AIS transponder. According to intercepted radio messages, the ship is communicating with an unidentified ship that is also operating nearby. The position data are also confirmed by radar-based remote sensing data from KSAT.

The Sibiryakov had previously accompanied a newly built Russian submarine on a test trip.
