= Losos =

Losos ("salmon" in multiple Slavic languages) may refer to:

- Losos-class submarine, a type of Soviet submarine
- Jonathan Losos (born 1961), American evolutionary biologist
- Yvonne Losos de Muñiz (born 1967), Dominican Republic equestrian
- The word for Salmon in many Slavic languages
