= MT-class minesweeper =

Class overview
- Name: MT class (Project 253L)
- Operators: Soviet Navy; Polish Navy
- Built: 1943-1945
- In commission: 1943-1956
- Completed: 92
- Lost: 1
- Retired: 91

General characteristics
- Displacement: 126.6-141.3 tons
- Length: 38 meters
- Beam: 5.7 meters
- Draft: 1.4 meters
- Installed power: 3x230 hp (170 kW)
- Propulsion: diesel engines driving triple screws
- Speed: 14 knots (26 km/h)
- Range: 2,500 nmi (4,600 km) at 8.6 kn (15.9 km/h)
- Armament: 2 45mm 21-K AA guns; 2 12.7mm machine gun
- Armor: 8mm (control room only)

The MT class were a group of coastal minesweepers built for the Soviet Navy in the 1943-1945. The Soviet designation was Project 253L.

== Design ==
The specifications for the Project 253 were issued in April 1942 by admiral Lev Galler. Initial design iteration made by TsKB-32 was unsatisfactory and was transferred in 1943 to TsKB-51 for improvements, resulting in Project 253L (named after chief designer N. G. Loshchinskii). The minesweepers were badly needed in the heavily mined Baltic Sea, therefore pre-production series comprising 32 vessels were ordered 12 April 1943, followed by full-capacity production on two shipyards starting from 12 June 1943. The minesweeper was extremely successful, resulting in 4 shipyards assigned to its production starting from 31 October 1943.

Two main versions were produced:

- MT-1 (June 1943) - full displacement 126.6 tons
- MT-2 (April 1944) - full displacement increased to 141.3 tons, smaller engines rated to 160 hp (120 kW).

The ships were routinely fitted with four mine-sweeping gears, comprising two mechanical trails, magnetic and acoustic towed trails.

== Ships ==
A total of 92 ships were built, all to the Baltic fleet operation. Numbers were T-222 to T-249, T-351 to T-391, T-434 to T-441, T-459 to T-479. Only T-387 was lost to enemy action been sunk by German submarine U-481 28 November 1944.

In 1946, the seven minesweepers (T-225, T-228, T-231, T-241, T-244, T-465, T-467) were transferred to the Polish Navy.

Upon retirement in 1956, the MT minesweepers were routinely converted into diving support ships.

== See also ==
- List of ships of the Soviet Navy
- List of ships of Russia by project number
