= Alexandrit-class minesweeper =

Russian naval minesweeper class

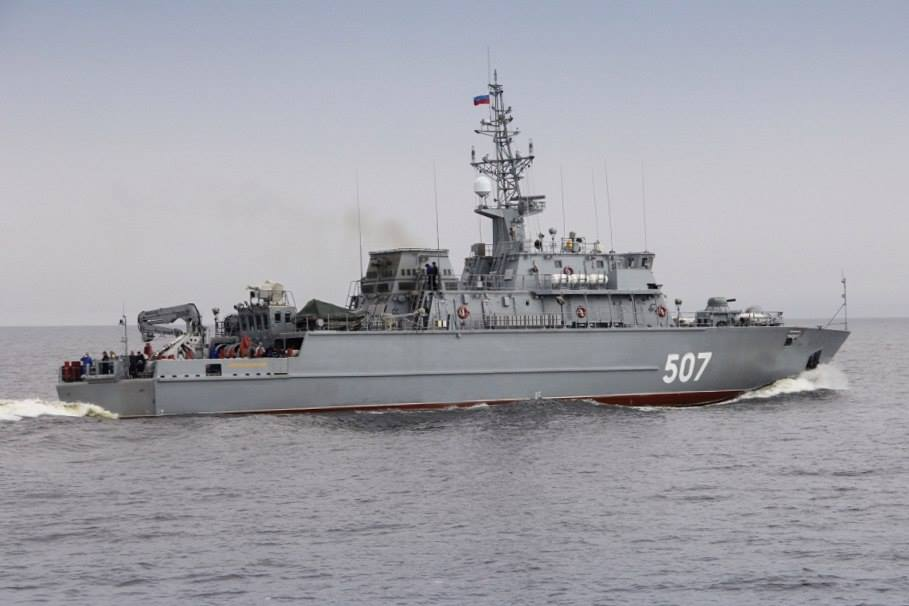
- Aleksandr Obukhov underway

Class overview
- Name: Aleksandrit class
- Builders: Sredne-Nevsky Shipyard
- Operators: Russian Navy
- Preceded by: Gorya class; Sonya class
- Built: 2011–present
- In commission: 2016–present
- Planned: 40
- Building: 5
- Completed: 11
- Active: 11

General characteristics
- Type: Minesweeper
- Displacement: 620 tons (standard); 890 tons (full load)
- Length: 61.0 m (200 ft 2 in)
- Beam: 10.2 m (33 ft 6 in)
- Draught: 2.68 m (8 ft 10 in)
- Installed power: 1 × 2,500 hp (1,900 kW) diesel, 2 diesel generators x 315 kW; 2 diesel generators x 210 kW
- Propulsion: 2 × Zvezda M503 diesels
- Speed: 16.5 knots (31 km/h)
- Range: 1,600 nmi (3,000 km; 1,800 mi) at 10 knots (19 km/h; 12 mph)
- Endurance: 10 days
- Complement: 45
- Armament: 1 × AK-306 CIWS; 1 × 14.5 × 114 mm MTPU HMG; Igla or Verba MANPADS; Mines

The Alexandrit class, Russian designation Project 12700 Aleksandrit (for the mineral alexandrite), is the newest class of Russian minesweepers designed by Almaz and being built by the Sredne-Nevsky Shipyard for the Russian Navy. The first ship was laid down on 22 September 2011 and was launched in June 2014. Anywhere between 30 and 50+ ships have been described as envisaged.

== History ==
The lead ship of the class, Aleksandr Obukhov, was laid down on 22 September 2011 during a keel-laying ceremony at the Sredne-Nevsky Shipyard in Saint Petersburg. Originally, the ship was planned to be launched in 2012 and commissioned in 2015, but the deadlines were postponed several times due to the international sanctions imposed against Russia and due to French refusal to deliver necessary equipment for completion of the vessel, namely the mine search system.

In July 2015, Aleksandr Obukhov was transferred to Kronstadt to begin its sea trials in the Baltic Sea. It took part in the 2015 Navy parade but had to be later towed back to Sredne-Nevsky Shipyard for further retrofitting. It was again transferred to Kronstadt on 2 December 2015 and its sea trials began on 29 April 2016. The ship was accepted into service on 9 December 2016.

According to the shipyard's representatives the first hull was shaped within one and one-half days, making it a world record.

In March 2015, Russian Navy's Deputy Commander-in-Chief Vice-Admiral Viktor Bursuk stated there are plans to supply the Navy with about 10 project 12700 vessels by 2025, and up to 30 by 2050.

The second ship, the first serial one, Georgiy Kurbatov, was laid down on 24 April 2015.

On 7 June 2016, hull of the second ship was damaged by fire while it was under construction. According to shipyard officials, this would not affect the construction time, however, the launch date was later postponed.

On 9 December 2016, Russian Navy's Commander-in-Chief Vladimir Korolyov reported, a contract was signed for construction of seven more project 12700 vessels with a total of 40 planned.

On 9 June 2017, the Russian Defence Ministry announced first two vessels, out of the 40 planned, will be delivered to the Navy in 2018. Further it was reported the Srdne-Nevskiy Shipyard in Saint Petersburg would build two ships per year. A total of 11 vessels has so far been ordered. 1 more ordered in August 2021.

== Design ==
The main feature of project 12700 is a monolithic fibreglass hull shaped by vacuum infusion, a modern construction method which results in a lighter hull with a longer service life. The ships of the class are designed to use various flails, as well as tele-guided and autonomous unmanned underwater vehicles and unmanned surface vehicles to disable or destroy mines at safe distances.

On 18 January 2024, during the laying ceremony of Semyon Agafonov, the general director of the Almaz Central Marine Design Bureau stated that the design of the class will be modernised.

== Export ==
India has shown interest in the minesweeper and has been in talks about starting producing the ship under licence. India would require at least ten ships. In September 2016 talks were suspended as the Indian delegation awaits the results of the operational evaluation of the first Russian ship.

On 9 June 2017, Russian Navy Deputy Commander Vice-Admiral Viktor Bursuk stated there were plans for the construction of additional ships at shipyards in East Asia. It is unclear if he was referring to shipyards in the Russian Far East or in other countries situated in East Asia.

== Ships ==
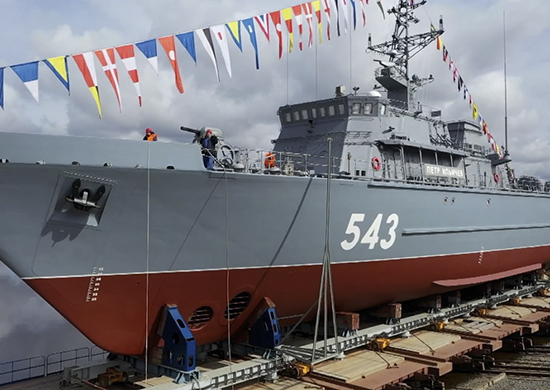
Minesweeper Pyotr Ilyichev

Nº	Name	Laid down	Launched	Commissioned	Fleet	Status
1	Aleksandr Obukhov	22 September 2011	27 June 2014	9 December 2016	Baltic	Active
2	Georgiy Kurbatov	24 April 2015	30 September 2020	20 August 2021	Black Sea	Active
3	Ivan Antonov	25 January 2017	25 April 2018	26 January 2019	Black Sea	Active
4	Vladimir Yemelyanov	20 April 2017	30 May 2019	28 December 2019	Black Sea	Active
5	Yakov Balyaev	26 December 2017	29 January 2020	26 December 2020	Pacific	Active
6	Pyotr Ilyichev	25 July 2018	28 April 2021	16 November 2022	Pacific	Active
7	Anatoly Shlemov	12 July 2019	26 November 2021	29 December 2022	Pacific	Active
8	Lev Chernavin	24 July 2020	14 April 2023	25 December 2023	Baltic	Active
9	Afanasy Ivannikov	9 September 2021	9 August 2024	7 May 2025	Northern	Active
10	Polyarny	12 June 2022	24 April 2025	30 April 2026	Northern	Active
11	Dmitry Lysov	19 June 2023	5 December 2025	18 November 2026	Northern	Active
12	Semyon Agafonov	18 January 2024	30 September 2026		Northern	Fitting out
13	Viktor Korner	16 July 2024				Under construction
14	Sergey Preminin	16 May 2025				Under construction
15	Leonid Balyakin	29 August 2025				Under construction
16	Dmitry Glukhov	24 April 2026				Under construction

== See also ==
- List of ships of the Soviet Navy
- List of ships of Russia by project number
