= Gorya-class minesweeper =

Class of Soviet Navy minesweeper ships

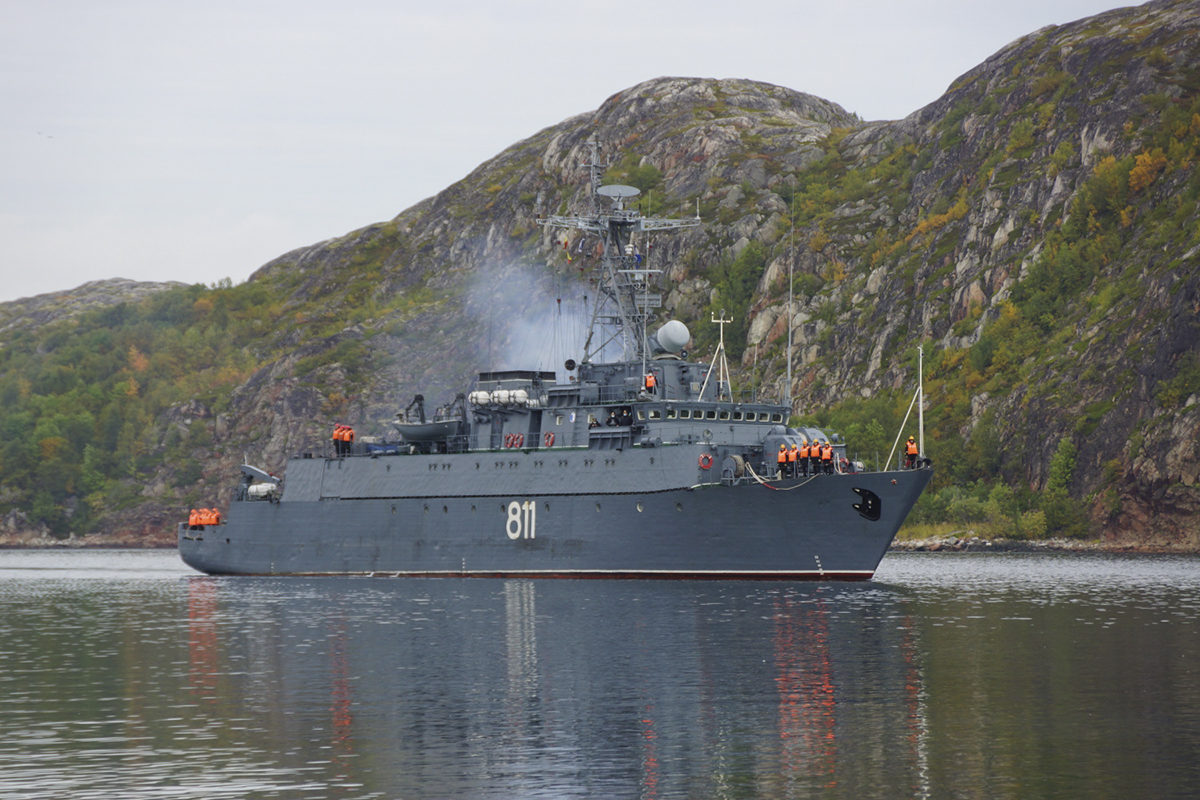
- Minesweeper Vladimir Gumanenko in 2020

Class overview
- Name: Gorya class (Project 12660)
- Builders: Baltic Werf
- Operators: Soviet Navy; Russian Navy
- Preceded by: Natya-class minesweeper
- Succeeded by: Alexandrit-class minesweeper
- In commission: 1988-present
- Planned: 20
- Completed: 2
- Canceled: 18
- Active: 2

General characteristics
- Class & type: Gorya class minehunter
- Displacement: 900 tons, 1100 tons full load
- Length: 70 m (230 ft)
- Beam: 12 m (39 ft)
- Draught: 4 m (13 ft)
- Propulsion: 2 × M-503B-37 Diesel engines 5000 hp
- Speed: 16 knots (30 km/h)
- Range: 1,500 nautical miles (2,778.0 km) at 12 knots (22 km/h)
- Endurance: 7 days
- Crew: 60
- Sensors & processing systems: Sonar: High frequency, hull mounted, active mine detection; Radar: Palm Frond; Bass Tilt
- Electronic warfare & decoys: Minesweeping: AT-2 acoustic sweep; GKT-2 contact sweep; TEM-3 magnetic sweep
- Armament: 1 × AK-176M 76mm gun; 1 × 30mm AK-630 CIWS; 2 × SA-N-14 SAM missiles; torpedo tubes

The Gorya class, Soviet designation Project 12660, are a group of minesweepers built for the Soviet Navy in the late 1980s. Three ships were started of which two were completed and are in service with the Russian Navy.

== Design ==
The ships are designed for deep ocean sweeping of captor mines with sophisticated mine detection equipment. Sweeping gear includes two submersibles as well as conventional sweeps. Russian press boasted that the Project 12660 minesweepers were the first sweepers in the history of Soviet military shipbuilding capable of not only destroying the "Captor" mines, "Colas" ASW coverage buoys, and other enemy underwater objects at depths of up to 1000 meters.

== Ships ==
A total of twenty ships were planned, but the programme was stopped by the collapse of the Soviet Union. Two ships were completed.

Name	Hull No.	Laid down	Launched	Commissioned	Fleet	Status
Anatoly Zheleznyakov	901			1988	Black Sea Fleet	Active
Vladimir Gumanenko	811			1994	Northern Fleet	Active

== See also ==
- List of ships of the Soviet Navy
- List of ships of Russia by project number
