= Soviet submarine S-99 =

1950s experimental ship

- Profile of Whale-class submarine

History

Soviet Union
- Name: S-99
- Builder: Sudomekh Shipyard, Leningrad
- Laid down: 5 February 1951
- Launched: 5 February 1952
- Completed: December 1955
- Commissioned: 26 March 1956
- Decommissioned: 28 February 1964
- Reclassified: As an experimental submarine, 31 August 1961
- Fate: Scrapped after 28 February 1964

General characteristics
- Type: Experimental submarine
- Displacement: 950 t (930 long tons) (surfaced); 1,500 t (1,476 long tons) (submerged)
- Length: 62.2 m (204 ft 1 in)
- Beam: 6.08 m (19 ft 11 in)
- Draft: 5.08 m (16 ft 8 in)
- Propulsion: 1 × propeller shaft; 1 × Walter HTP turbine (7,250 PS (5,330 kW)); 1 × Diesel engine (600 PS (440 kW)); 1 × Electric motor (540 PS (400 kW)); 1 × Electric motor (140 PS (100 kW))
- Speed: 11 knots (20 km/h; 13 mph) (surfaced); 20 knots (37 km/h; 23 mph) (submerged)
- Range: 8,500 nmi (15,700 km; 9,800 mi) at 8.5 knots (15.7 km/h; 9.8 mph) (surfaced); 198 nmi (367 km; 228 mi) at 14.2 knots (26.3 km/h; 16.3 mph) (submerged)
- Endurance: 45 days
- Test depth: 170 m (560 ft)
- Complement: 51
- Sensors & processing systems: Tamir-5LS sonar; Mars-24 KEG hydrophones; Nakat radar
- Armament: 6 × 533 mm (21 in) bow torpedo tubes

S-99 (Russian: С-99) was an experimental submarine and the only ship of the Project 617 class (codenamed Whale) that the Soviet Union built during the early Cold War. She was the only Soviet submarine which used a German Walter turbine fueled by high-test peroxide (HTP). Entering service in 1956, the boat was assigned to a training unit of the Baltic Fleet. S-99 was badly damaged by a HTP explosion in 1959 and was not repaired. The submarine was decommissioned in 1964 and subsequently scrapped.

== Background ==
At the end of the Second World War, the Soviets captured components for the HTP-fuelled Type XXVI submarine as well as engineers and technicians who had worked on the Walter turbine that used HTP. To make use of this new technology, they established a new submarine design bureau in Germany headed by Engineer-Captain Aleksei A. Antipin, formerly head of Central Design Bureau No. 18 (TsKB-18), which was tasked with the collection of plans and documents relating to the Type XXVI and its components. TsKB-18 began designing a copy of the German submarine as Project 616 in 1946, intending to order components from East Germany, but the vessel was rejected by the Soviet Navy as it did not meet Soviet standards for reserve buoyancy and other issues. Together with the Central Research Shipbuilding Institute No. 45, the bureau immediately then began an original design utilizing the Walter HTP turbine. Preliminary design work on Project 617 was finished at the end of 1947.

A new design bureau for high-speed submarines (SKB-143) was established on 30 March 1948 and the Antipin Bureau was folded into the new organization with Antipin in charge. Knowing that the Walter HTP turbine technology was unproven, he decided to construct the submarine's propulsion plant and its hull compartment in a building at the Sudomekh Shipyard in Leningrad. The turbine used original German-built components as much as possible and was tested through the beginning of 1951. It was carefully disassembled in May and repaired as necessary in preparation for installation in S-99 whose construction had begun a few months prior.

== Description ==
S-99 was a double-hulled submarine that displaced 950 tonnes (930 long tons) on the surface and 1,500 tonnes (1,476 long tons) submerged. The boat had an overall length of 62.2 meters (204 ft 1 in), a beam of 6.08 meters (19 ft 11 in) and a draft of 5.08 meters (16 ft 8 in). S-99's crew numbered 51 officers and men. Her hull was divided into six compartments; the sail was very small and did not have a compartment. The hull was fitted with anechoic tiles captured from the Germans. The boat had a reserve buoyancy of 28%, enough to remain afloat with any single compartment flooded, a figure more than two and a half times greater than that of the Type XXVI. S-99 had a test depth of 170 meters (560 ft) and a design depth of 200 meters (660 ft). In service, she proved to be maneuverable but was very noisy at full speed.

The submarine was primarily powered by a Walter HTP turbine that drove a single propeller shaft using steam generated when highly concentrated hydrogen peroxide was sprayed onto a layer of activated charcoal to produce high-pressure steam and oxygen at a temperature of 963 °C (1,765 °F). This passed into a combustion chamber into which kerosene was injected. The resulting combustion converted the oxygen into carbon dioxide and carbon monoxide and further increased the mixture's temperature and pressure. Water was then added to the mixture to reduce the temperature down to about 530 °C (986 °F), double the volume of the steam and convert the supersaturated steam into saturated steam better suited for powering a geared steam turbine. The steam/gas mixture was passed through a condenser to recover the water while the combustion gases were exhausted into the ocean. S-99's turbine could generate 7,250 metric horsepower (5,330 kW) in shallow water, but only 6,050 PS (4,450 kW) at depths of 30–40 meters (98–131 ft) because the pressure of the deeper water created more back pressure which reduced the turbine's efficiency. The turbine gave the boat a submerged speed in excess of 20 knots (37 km/h; 23 mph).

S-99 was also provided with a diesel-electric system that consisted of a 600 PS (440 kW) 8Ch-23/30 diesel engine and a 540 PS (400 kW) PG-100 electric motor for cruising. An additional 140 PS (100 kW) electric motor was intended for slow speeds underwater and could be powered by either the 112 Type 26-SU battery cells or a 450 PS (330 kW) DG-17 diesel generator. The boat was fitted with a folding snorkel to allow the diesel engines to operate while underwater.

The submarine's maximum speed on the surface was 11 knots (20 km/h; 13 mph) and she had a range of 120 nautical miles (220 km; 140 mi) at maximum speed on the Walter turbine and 198 nmi (367 km; 228 mi) at 14.2 knots (26.3 km/h; 16.3 mph). Using her diesel-electric system on the surface gave S-99 a range of 8,500 nmi (15,700 km; 9,800 mi) at 8.5 knots (15.7 km/h; 9.8 mph); using her snorkel reduced it to 8,000 nmi (15,000 km; 9,200 mi) at 5.8 knots (10.7 km/h; 6.7 mph). Using just the electric motor underwater, the submarine had a range of 13.9 nmi (25.7 km; 16.0 mi) at 9.3 knots (17.2 km/h; 10.7 mph). She had internal fuel tanks for 88.5 t (87.1 long tons) of diesel fuel and 13.9 t (13.7 long tons) of kerosene. Plastic bladders between the pressure hull and the outer hull held 103.4 t (101.8 long tons) of very expensive hydrogen peroxide. S-99 carried enough supplies for 45 days of operation.

The boat's armament consisted of six 533-millimeter (21 in) torpedo tubes mounted in the bow, each with one reload. Alternatively, 20 AMD-1000 naval mines could be carried. S-99 was fitted with a Tamir-5LS sonar, Mars-24-KEG hydrophones and a Nakat surface-search radar (NATO reporting name: Snoop Plate).

== Construction and career ==
S-99 was laid down on 5 February 1951 at the Shipyard No. 196 and launched on 5 February 1952. Naval historians vary on when the boat was commissioned or completed: Pavlov says she was completed in December 1955, but Friedman says she was commissioned on 6 June 1952 while Polmar and Moore give 26 March 1956. The boat's sea trials began on 16 June 1952 and lasted for years. Less than a year later, SKB-143 was pulled from Project 617 in March 1953 and tasked with developing a nuclear-powered submarine; TsKB-18 assumed responsibility for the project. Despite the testing of the Walter turbine ashore, the sea trials revealed that S-99 still had problems when HTP would decompose on contact with dirt or oil, causing fires or explosions.

During this time, TsKB-18 worked on Project 617M, an enlarged design with additional HTP and fuel as well as improved weapons and sensors. The bureau also considered two variants that utilized closed-cycle diesel engines, Project 635, a 1,660 t (1,630 long tons) (surface displacement), twin-turbine design and an even larger 1,865 t (1,836 long tons) boat, Project 643. Work on all of these was canceled in 1960 when all of the closed-cycle projects were terminated.

Upon commissioning, S-99 was assigned to a training brigade of the Baltic Fleet. Between 1956 and 1959, she went to sea 98 times, during which the boat cruised more than 6,000 nmi (11,000 km; 6,900 mi) on the surface and about 800 nmi (1,500 km; 920 mi) submerged. About 315 nmi (583 km; 362 mi) of the latter used the Walter turbine. On 17 May 1959, S-99 was cruising at a depth of 80 m (260 ft) when the turbine was started. This caused an explosion in the turbine compartment when HTP encountered mud in the hull valve of the HTP supply pipe. The resulting decomposition blew an 80-millimetre (3.1 in) hole in the pressure hull which caused the two rear compartments to partially flood. The submarine was able to surface and reached base on battery power. S-99 was not repaired because it was unfeasible to replace all of the damaged German parts. The submarine was reclassified as an experimental submarine on 31 August 1961. She was decommissioned on 28 February 1964 and later scrapped.

== See also ==
- German Type XVII submarine
- HMS Meteorite

== Bibliography ==
- Friedman, Norman (1995). "Soviet Union 1947–1991: Russian Federation and Successor States 1991–". In Chumbley, Stephen (ed.). Conway's All the World's Fighting Ships 1947–1995. Naval Institute Press. pp. 337–426. ISBN 978-1-55750-132-5.
- Pavlov, A. S. (1997). Warships of the USSR and Russia 1945–1995. Naval Institute Press. ISBN 1-55750-671-X.
- Polmar, Norman & Moore, Kenneth J. (2004). Cold War Submarines: The Design and Construction of U.S. and Soviet Submarines. Potomac Books. ISBN 978-1-57488-594-1.
- Rössler, Eberhard (2001) [1981]. The U-boat: The Evolution and Technical History of German Submarines. Cassell. ISBN 0-304-36120-8.
- Thomas, Steve (November 2022). "Fire and Water: Britain's Fast Submarine Program". Marine News Supplement: Warships. 76 (11): S599–S613. ISSN 0966-6958.
