= Soviet destroyer Opytny =

1935 Soviet Navy destroyer

- Opytny in Leningrad

History

Soviet Union
- Name: Sergo Ordzhonikidze
- Namesake: Sergo Ordzhonikidze
- Ordered: 2nd Five-Year Plan
- Builder: Shipyard No. 190 (Zhdanov), Leningrad
- Yard number: 500
- Laid down: 26 June 1935
- Launched: 8 December 1935
- Commissioned: 11 September 1941
- Out of service: March 1944
- Renamed: Opytny (Russian: Опытный, lit. 'Experimental'), 25 September 1940
- Stricken: 10 February 1953
- Nickname(s): Golden Fish or Golden 500
- Fate: Scrapped, 1953

General characteristics (as built)
- Type: Destroyer
- Displacement: 1,707 long tons (1,734 t) (normal)
- Length: 113.5 m (372 ft 5 in) (o/a)
- Beam: 10.2 m (33 ft 6 in)
- Draft: 4.6 m (15 ft 1 in) (deep load)
- Installed power: 4 Ramzin boilers; 70,000 shp (52,000 kW)
- Propulsion: 2 shafts; 2 geared steam turbines
- Speed: 35 knots (65 km/h; 40 mph)
- Range: 1,370 nmi (2,540 km; 1,580 mi) at 18 knots (33 km/h; 21 mph)
- Complement: 262
- Armament: 3 × single 130 mm (5.1 in) guns; 4 × single 45 mm (1.8 in) AA guns; 3 × single 37 mm (1.5 in) AA guns; 2 × quadruple 533 mm (21 in) torpedo tubes; 60 mines; 38 depth charges

Opytny (Russian: Опытный, lit. 'Experimental') was the only member of her class of destroyers built for the Soviet Navy during the 1930s. The Soviet designation for her class was Project 45. She was originally named Sergo Ordzhonikidze and was the first Soviet destroyer to be indigenously designed. Renamed Opytny in 1940, the ship was intended as a prototype for future Soviet destroyers.

Plagued with severe problems with her boilers, the ship was not suited for fleet operations, but the Axis invasion of the Soviet Union in June 1941 (Operation Barbarossa) forced the Navy to accept Opytny several months later. Assigned to the Baltic Fleet in August, the ship was limited to service as a floating battery to provide naval gunfire support for the Red Army during the Siege of Leningrad with frequent periods in reserve or under repair. Opytny was no longer useful after the end of the siege and she was taken out of service in March 1944. A proposal to turn her into a training ship was rejected after the end of World War II and the ship was scrapped in 1953.

== Background ==
When the naval architect Valerian Bzhezinsky was visiting German shipyards in 1930–1932, during the period when Weimar Germany and the Soviet Union were cooperating most closely, he was intrigued by the high-pressure Wagner boilers being developed for the German Navy. These offered the possibility of producing more power than lower-temperature propulsion plants for a given weight. After his appointment as director of the Soviet Navy's surface-ship design office in 1931 and the struggle to save weight with the design of the Gnevny-class destroyers in 1933–1934, he conceived of a smaller destroyer using this type of advanced propulsion machinery that would be much faster than the Gnevny class.

Bzhezinsky intended the ship to serve as a prototype to test the straight-flow, high-pressure boilers developed by Leonid Ramzin. These worked at a pressure of 75 kg/cm^{2} (7,355 kPa; 1,067 psi), almost three times the pressure used by the boilers of the Gnevny-class ships, and were intended to produce 70,000 shaft horsepower (52,000 kW), enough to give the ship a speed of 42 knots (78 km/h; 48 mph). This was more than enough to cooperate with the Leningrad-class destroyer leaders then under construction.

To maximize survivability, the ship's propulsion machinery was organized in a unit layout with alternating boiler rooms and engine rooms so that a single torpedo hit could not disable more than one pair of coupled boilers and engines. The separation between the boiler rooms dictated two widely spaced funnels. To save weight, welding was extensively used for the internal structure with traditional riveting limited to the hull plates. More weight savings would accrue from auxiliary machinery working on high-pressure steam and electrical equipment using alternating current. The Soviet Navy originally intended use the same armament as the Gnevny class, but decided to take advantage of the weight savings and augment the main armament to six 50-caliber 130-millimeter (5.1 in) B-13 guns in three twin-gun B-2LM turrets. They were arranged with a single mount forward of the superstructure and an superfiring pair at the stern. The main guns were to be controlled by a Galileo fire-control system with a Duplex fire-control director. The torpedo armament was to consist of two quadruple mounts for 533-millimeter (21 in) torpedo tubes, each of which was to be provided with a reload. The Soviets expected significant savings from the fuel-efficient boilers and the ship's range was anticipated to be 3,200 nautical miles (5,900 km; 3,700 mi) at 18 knots (33 km/h; 21 mph). The design was approved as Project 45 on 29 December 1934.

== Construction ==
The ship was laid down as yard number 500 at Shipyard No. 190 (Zhdanov) in Leningrad on 26 June 1935 under the 2nd Five-Year Plan. Launched on 8 December, further work was delayed by major problems with components that were not designed to be used with high-pressure steam or alternating current and the lengthy amount of time required to redesign the ship to accommodate devices that used low-pressure steam and direct current. Even though the Ramzin boilers were in service in power stations throughout the USSR, they often broke down when subject to the frequent changes in loads characteristic of naval boilers. They were not well-suited to manual operation, but an automatic-control system importated from Germany proved to be incapable of solving the problems and Soviet industry was unable to build a system that could. She was given the name Sergo Ordzhonikidze, then the Minister for Heavy Industry, in August 1936. The B-2LM turrets were also delayed and single mounts for the B-13 guns were installed in their place during late 1939 and early 1940. Firing the guns revealed the weakness in their supporting structure. The Galileo fire-control system was unavailable and the same Mina system that was used on the Gnevny-class ships was substituted for it. The lengthy delays and increasing costs of fixing her problems gave the ship the nickname of Golden Fish or Golden 500.

== Description ==
Opytny had an overall length of 113.5 meters (372 ft 5 in), a beam of 10.2 meters (33 ft 6 in), and a draft of 4.6 meters (15 ft 1 in) at deep load. The ship was significantly overweight, displacing 1,707 metric tons (1,680 long tons) at standard load and 2,016 metric tons (1,984 long tons) at deep load. Her crew numbered 262 officers and sailors. Opytny was powered by two geared steam turbine sets, each driving a single propeller shaft using steam provided by four Ramzin boilers that operated at a temperature of 450 °C (842 °F). During her first speed trials in 1940, boiler problems limited the ship to 25 knots (46 km/h; 29 mph) with bursts of 35 knots (65 km/h; 40 mph). Similarly her radius of action proved to be a major disappointment as her maximum capacity of 372 metric tons (366 long tons) of fuel oil only gave her a range of 1,370 nautical miles (2,540 km; 1,580 mi) at 18 knots (33 km/h; 21 mph), less than half of what expected.

=== Armament and fire control ===
Development of the B-2LM turrets was delayed and Opytny was completed with three single 130 mm mounts instead. Each gun was provided with 150 rounds. The manually operated mounts had an elevation range of −5° to +45° and had a rate of fire of 6–10 rounds per minute. They fired a 33.4-kilogram (74 lb) shell at a muzzle velocity of 870 m/s (2,900 ft/s), which gave them a range of 25,597 meters (27,993 yd).

Anti-aircraft defense was provided by four 46-caliber 45-millimeter (1.8 in) 21-K AA guns, all in single mounts grouped around the forward funnel, three 67-caliber 37-millimeter (1 in) 70-K AA guns positioned abaft the rear funnel as well as a pair of 12.7-millimeter (0.50 in) DK machine guns in single mounts. The 21-K was a converted anti-tank gun with a rate of fire of 25–30 rounds per minute with an elevation range between −10° and +85°. The gun fired a 1.41-kilogram (3.1 lb) shell at a muzzle velocity of 760 m/s (2,500 ft/s). This gave them a range of 9,200 meters (10,100 yd). Opytny stowed 1,000 rounds for each gun. The 70-K had the same range of elevation as the 21-K, but fired its shells about six times more quickly than the bigger gun. Its shells weighed 0.732 kilograms (1.61 lb) and were fired at a muzzle velocity of 880 m/s (2,900 ft/s) to a range in excess of 4,000 meters (4,400 yd). The ship carried 3,000 rounds per gun. The DK machine guns had an effective rate of fire of 125 rounds per minute and an effective range against aircraft of 2,500 meters (2,700 yd).

Opytny was equipped with eight 533 mm torpedo tubes in two rotating quadruple mounts amidships, but only half the tubes were provided with a reload. The ship was intended to fitted for 10 B-1 and 15 M-1 depth charges, but she was completed with room for 28 M-1 charges in addition to the B-1s. The destroyer could also carry a maximum of 60 KB mines.

Fire control for Opytny's main battery was provided by a Mina fire-control system that was derived from an Italian Galileo system. It included a TsAS-2 mechanical analog computer that received information from a KDP2-4 gunnery director on the roof of the bridge which mounted a pair of DM-4 four-meter (13 ft 1 in) stereoscopic rangefinders. Anti-aircraft fire control was strictly manual with only a DM-3 three-meter (9 ft 10 in) rangefinder to provide data to the guns.

== Career ==
The ship was renamed Opytny on 25 September 1940 and was scheduled for her final sea trials in June–August 1941, but the Axis invasion disrupted those plans. She was provisionally accepted by the Soviet Navy on 17 August and was assigned to support 42nd and 52nd Armies of the Leningrad Front on 30 August.

The ship was formally commissioned on 11 September. Not long afterwards, Opytny suffered significant damage from German artillery fire and was under repair from November 1941 to August 1942. For most of this period, her main guns were removed. The ship was reduced to reserve in July 1943 and was taken entirely out of service in March 1944, after the end of the Siege of Leningrad. Opytny was refitted beginning in September 1947, but a proposal to rebuild her as a training ship was rejected. The ship was stricken on 10 February 1953 and subsequently scrapped in Leningrad.

== Bibliography ==
- Budzbon, Przemysław (1980). "Soviet Union". In Chesneau, Roger (ed.). Conway's All the World's Fighting Ships 1922–1946. Greenwich, UK: Conway Maritime Press. pp. 318–346. ISBN 0-85177-146-7.
- Budzbon, Przemysław; Radziemski, Jan & Twardowski, Marek (2022). Warships of the Soviet Fleets 1939–1945. Vol. I: Major Combatants. Annapolis, Maryland: Naval Institute Press. ISBN 978-1-68247-877-6.
- Hill, Alexander (2018). Soviet Destroyers of World War II. New Vanguard. Vol. 256. Oxford, UK: Osprey Publishing. ISBN 978-1-4728-2256-7.
- Platonov, Andrey V. (2002). Энциклопедия советских надводных кораблей 1941–1945 [Encyclopedia of Soviet Surface Ships 1941–1945] (in Russian). Saint Petersburg: Poligon. ISBN 5-89173-178-9.
- Rohwer, Jürgen (2005). Chronology of the War at Sea 1939–1945: The Naval History of World War Two (Third Revised ed.). Annapolis, Maryland: Naval Institute Press. ISBN 1-59114-119-2.
- Rohwer, Jürgen & Monakov, Mikhail S. (2001). Stalin's Ocean-Going Fleet: Soviet Naval Strategy and Shipbuilding Programs 1935–1953. London: Frank Cass. ISBN 0-7146-4895-7.
- Westwood, J. N. (1994). Russian Naval Construction, 1905–45. London: Macmillan. ISBN 0-333-55553-8.
- Yakubov, Vladimir & Worth, Richard (2008). "The Soviet Project 7/7U Destroyers". In Jordan, John & Dent, Stephen (eds.). Warship 2008. London: Conway. pp. 99–114. ISBN 978-1-84486-062-3.
