= Soviet submarine M-256 =

- Scheme of Quebec class

History

Soviet Union
- Name: M-256
- Laid down: 23 September 1953
- Launched: 15 September 1954
- Completed: 21 December 1955
- Fate: Wrecked by fire and sunk, 26 September 1957

General characteristics
- Class & type: Quebec-class submarine
- Displacement: 460 long tons (467 t) surfaced; 540 long tons (549 t) submerged
- Length: 56 m (183 ft 9 in)
- Beam: 5.1 m (16 ft 9 in)
- Draft: 3.8 m (12 ft 6 in)
- Propulsion: Kreislauf system: 2 × 700 hp (520 kW) conventional diesel engines; 1 × 900 hp (670 kW) AIP (LOX) diesel engine; 1 × electric creep motor; three shafts
- Speed: 18 knots (21 mph; 33 km/h) surfaced; 16 knots (18 mph; 30 km/h) submerged
- Range: 2,750 nmi (5,090 km) at cruising speed on surface
- Complement: 42 officers and men
- Armament: 4 × 21 in (533 mm) torpedo tubes in bow; 8 × anti-submarine/anti-ship torpedoes

M-256 was a Project 615 (NATO: "Quebec-class") short-range, diesel attack submarine of the Soviet Navy. She was commissioned into the Baltic Fleet.

== Design ==
Project 615 submarines were fitted with two regular diesel engines and a third, closed-cycle diesel engine, which used liquid oxygen (LOX) to provide air-independent propulsion while the submarine was submerged. This system produced remarkable submerged speed and range, but greatly increased the hazard of a fire. Project 615 submarines were referred to by their crews as "matchsticks."

== Sinking ==
On 26 September 1957, while operating in gale conditions in the Gulf of Finland of the Baltic Sea, one of M-256’s diesel engines exploded. Fire immediately engulfed the diesel compartment, and soon spread to the next compartment. The boat surfaced and because of the likelihood of further explosions her crew evacuated onto her weather deck. None of the four ships keeping station nearby were able to take her under tow or evacuate her crew because of the gale conditions. About four hours after the beginning of the fire the boat suddenly lost longitudinal stability, took on a steep down-bubble, and sank. Of the 35 men on the boat's deck, only seven were rescued.
