= Beluga-class submarine =

Russian experimental submarine

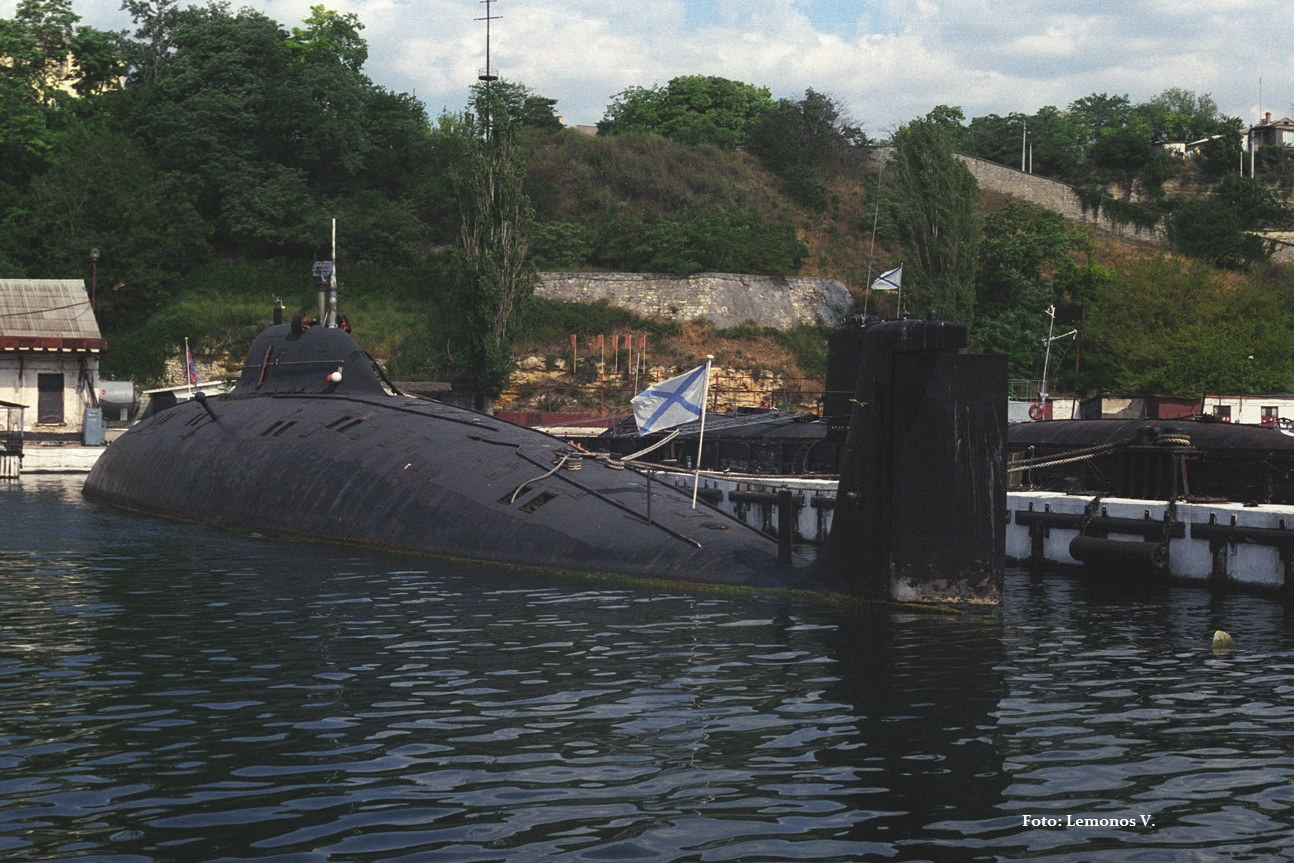
- SS-533 of Beluga class in Sevastopol, 2001

History

Russia
- Builder: United Admiralty Shipyard 196
- Launched: 1986
- Commissioned: 1988
- Out of service: 1998
- Stricken: 2007
- Fate: Stricken

General characteristics
- Type: Submarine
- Displacement: 1,400-1,485 tons surfaced; 1,900 submerged
- Length: 62.0–65.5 m (203 ft 5 in – 214 ft 11 in)
- Beam: 6.3–8.7 m (20 ft 8 in – 28 ft 7 in)
- Draught: 5.6–6.0 m (18 ft 4 in – 19 ft 8 in)
- Propulsion: Diesel-electric
- Speed: 10 knots (19 km/h) surfaced; 22–24 knots (41–44 km/h) submerged

Project 1710 Makrel (Russian: 1710 «Макрель»; NATO reporting name "Beluga") was a Russian SSA diesel-electric submarine. It was an experimental vessel used for testing propulsion systems, hull forms, and boundary-layer control techniques.

Development was undertaken by the Malakhit Design Bureau with construction at the Admiralty shipyard in St. Petersburg.

The lone Beluga-class submarine in operation was S-553 Forel. Launched in 1986 and moth-balled around 1998, the last operation of the vessel is thought to have taken place in 1997. As of the mid-2000s, the entire project is believed to have been discontinued.

== Bibliography ==
- Pavlov, A. S. (1997). Warships of the USSR and Russia 1945–1995. Naval Institute Press. ISBN 1-55750-671-X.
- Polmar, Norman (2026). Submarines of the Russian and Soviet Navies: 1946–2026. Schiffer Publishing. ISBN 978-0-7643-7083-0.
- Polmar, Norman & Noot, Jurrien (1991). Submarines of the Russian and Soviet Navies, 1718–1990. Naval Institute Press. ISBN 0-87021-570-1.
