= Kashalot-class submarine =

Soviet submarine class

Class overview
- Name: Kashalot
- Builders: Soviet Union
- Operators: Soviet Navy; Russian Navy
- Built: 1977–1991
- In service: 1986–present
- Planned: 3
- Completed: 2
- Canceled: 1
- Active: 2

General characteristics
- Displacement: 1,390 tons normal surfaced/1,580 tons submerged
- Length: 69 m (226 ft 5 in)
- Beam: 7 m (23 ft 0 in)
- Draft: 5.2 m (17 ft 1 in)
- Propulsion: One pressurized-water nuclear reactor 1.5 MW (2,000 hp), 1 sets steam turbines; 10,000 shp (7,500 kW)
- Speed: 10 knots (19 km/h; 12 mph) surfaced; 30 knots (56 km/h; 35 mph) submerged
- Complement: About 36
- Sensors & processing systems: Radar: 1 Snoop Slab search; Sonar: HF active

The Kashalot-class submarine (NATO reporting name: Uniform), Soviet designation Project 1910, is a class of research and special operations submarine constructed by the Soviet Union during the late 1970s and early 1980s.

Two boats of the class were constructed, AS-13 and AS-15, with the first boat of the class being laid down in 1977 and commissioned in 1986, the second being laid down in 1983 but not commissioned until 1991. A third class boat, AS-12, reached the fitting-out stage before being cancelled in 1998.

Displacing 1,580 tons submerged, the Kashalot class was constructed using a single titanium hull design, and is powered by a nuclear reactor; they were the first Soviet nuclear-powered submarines to have a single hull. The boats each have a crew of 36 officers and men. AS-13 and AS-15 were reported active as of 2016. In 2021 it was reported that AS-15 was being returned to active operations in conjunction with the submarine Belgorod.

== See also ==
- List of submarine classes in service
