= Lima-class submarine =

History

Soviet Union
- Name: Project 1840
- Commissioned: 1979
- Decommissioned: 1994

General characteristics
- Displacement: 2000 tonnes surfaced, 2450 tonnes submerged
- Length: 86 m
- Beam: 9.5 m
- Draught: 7.4 m
- Propulsion: Diesel-electric
- Speed: 17 knots surfaced, 14 knots submerged
- Complement: 42
- Armament: Unarmed

Project 1840 is the name of a Soviet diesel-electric research submarine design of which only one vessel was built. The design is known in the west by its NATO reporting name Lima. The submarine, which was assigned hull number БС-555 (БС, большая специальная or bolshaya spetsialnaya, meaning large special), was completed in 1979, and used by the Black Sea Fleet. It was decommissioned and laid up in 1994. The unarmed vessel was equipped with two diving chambers for deep-sea operations and hydro-acoustic experiments.

== Bibliography ==
- Friedman, Norman (1995). "Soviet Union 1947–1991: Russian Federation and Successor States 1991–". In Chumbley, Stephen (ed.). Conway's All the World's Fighting Ships 1947–1995. Naval Institute Press. pp. 337–426. ISBN 1-55750-132-7.
- Pavlov, A. S. (1997). Warships of the USSR and Russia 1945–1995. Naval Institute Press. ISBN 1-55750-671-X.
- Polmar, Norman (2026). Submarines of the Russian and Soviet Navies: 1946–2026. Schiffer Publishing. ISBN 978-0-7643-7083-0.
- Polmar, Norman & Moore, Kenneth J. (2004). Cold War Submarines: The Design and Construction of U.S. and Soviet Submarines. Potomac Books. ISBN 978-1-57488-594-1.
- Polmar, Norman & Noot, Jurrien (1991). Submarines of the Russian and Soviet Navies, 1718–1990. Naval Institute Press. ISBN 0-87021-570-1.
