= Bravo-class submarine =

Soviet military submarine class (1967–1995)

Class overview
- Operators: Soviet Navy
- In commission: 1967–1995
- Completed: 4
- Retired: 4

General characteristics
- Type: Submarine
- Displacement: 2,400 long tons (2,439 t) surfaced; 2,900 long tons (2,947 t) submerged
- Length: 73 m (239 ft 6 in)
- Beam: 9.8 m (32 ft 2 in)
- Draft: 7.3 m (23 ft 11 in)
- Propulsion: Diesel-electric
- Speed: 14 knots (26 km/h)
- Complement: 65
- Armament: 1 × 533 mm (21 in), 1 × 400 mm (16 in) torpedo tubes

The Project 690 Kefal ("Mullet") class (known in the West by its NATO reporting name Bravo class) was a design of military submarines that were built in the Soviet Union. The boats were designed for use in ASW exercises, but could also be employed in a combat role. Four vessels were built, which were commissioned into the Soviet Navy between 1967 and 1970. All four boats were stricken in the 1990s.

== Bibliography ==
- Polmar, Norman & Noot, Jurrien (1991). Submarines of the Russian and Soviet Navies, 1718–1990. Naval Institute Press. ISBN 0-87021-570-1.
- Polmar, Norman (2026). Submarines of the Russian and Soviet Navies: 1946–2026. Schiffer Publishing. ISBN 978-0-7643-7083-0.
