= Quebec-class submarine =

Class of Soviet coastal submarine

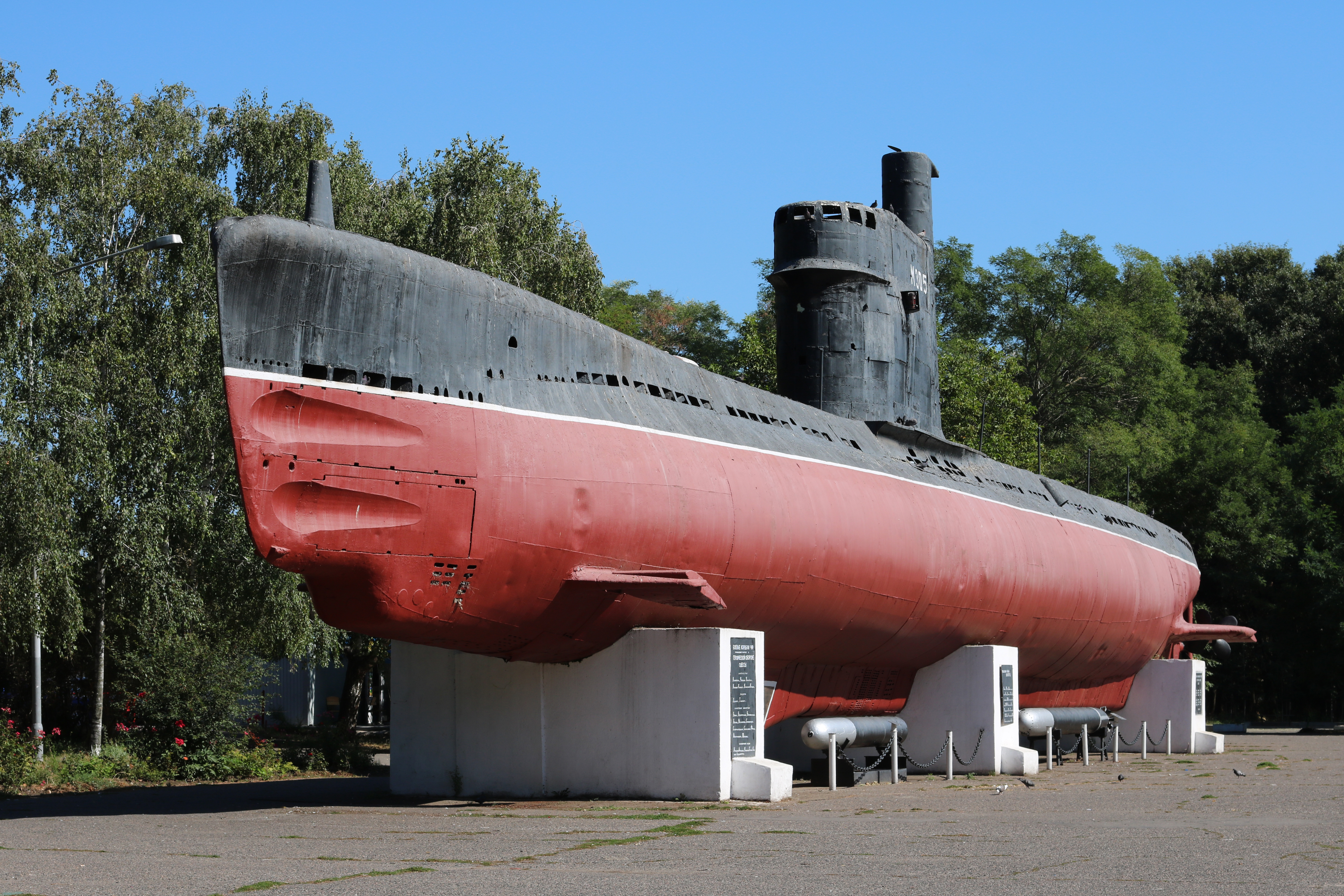
- M-296 in Odessa

Class overview
- Operators: Soviet Navy
- Preceded by: M class
- Built: 1952-1957
- In commission: 1952-1970s
- Planned: 100
- Completed: 30
- Preserved: 2

General characteristics
- Displacement: 460 tons surfaced, 540 tons submerged
- Length: 56.0 m (183 ft 9 in)
- Beam: 5.1 m (16 ft 9 in)
- Draft: 3.8 m (12 ft 6 in)
- Propulsion: closed cycle system: 2 × 700 hp (520 kW) conventional diesel engines, 1 × 900 hp (670 kW) AIP (liquid oxygen) diesel engine, 1 × electric sneak motor; three shafts
- Speed: 18 knots (33 km/h) surfaced, 16 knots (30 km/h) submerged
- Range: 2,750 nautical miles (5,090 km) at cruising speed on surface
- Complement: 30 officers and men
- Armament: 4 × 533 mm (21 in) torpedo tubes in bow, 4 × K-45 anti-submarine/anti-ship torpedoes

The Quebec-class submarine was the NATO reporting name of the Soviet Project 615 submarine class, a small coastal submarine of the late 1950s.

== Background ==
Prior to World War II, work on closed-cycle diesel engines was carried out by S.A. Basilevskiy, who developed a powerplant codenamed REDO. The exhaust gases from the diesel engine were compressed and the carbon dioxide extracted and dumped overboard, before the purified gases were mixed with stored oxygen and fed back into the engine. A prototype of this powerplant was installed in the experimental submarine M-401, laid down at Gorky on 28 November 1939 and launched on 31 May 1941.

M-401 made 74 cruises in the Caspian Sea including 68 dives and 360 nmi (670 km; 410 mi) of submerged running on its closed-cycle plant. Further work was temporarily suspended due to the war but was resumed after hostilities ended, at Leningrad.

The data obtained from trials of M-401 formed a basis for the design of the Project 615 Quebec-class.

== Description ==
Quebec-class submarines were fitted with two regular diesel engines and a third, closed-cycle diesel engine, which used liquid oxygen to provide air-independent propulsion while the submarine was submerged.

The Quebec class had a streamlined conning tower with a fixed snorkel housing at the rear end. They were armed with four torpedo tubes in the bow, for which no reloads were carried, and earlier boats also had a twin 25 mm anti-aircraft gun faired into the forward end of the tower, making them some of the last submarines to be constructed with deck guns.

The Quebec-class was plagued with problems caused by liquid oxygen evaporation. Their endurance was limited to 14 days due to continuous evaporation of the oxygen and lack of a re-liquefaction system, and the propulsion system led to several serious incidents. In 1957 two submarines were lost due to accidents caused by the oxygen system. M-256 suffered a fire off Tallinn in the Baltic, which led to the loss of 35 men, while M-351 sank in the Black Sea with no casualties. Other incidents caused oxygen-fueled flames to burst out from the boats, which led to their crews to nickname them zazhigalka ("lighters") or Zippos after the well-known cigarette lighter.

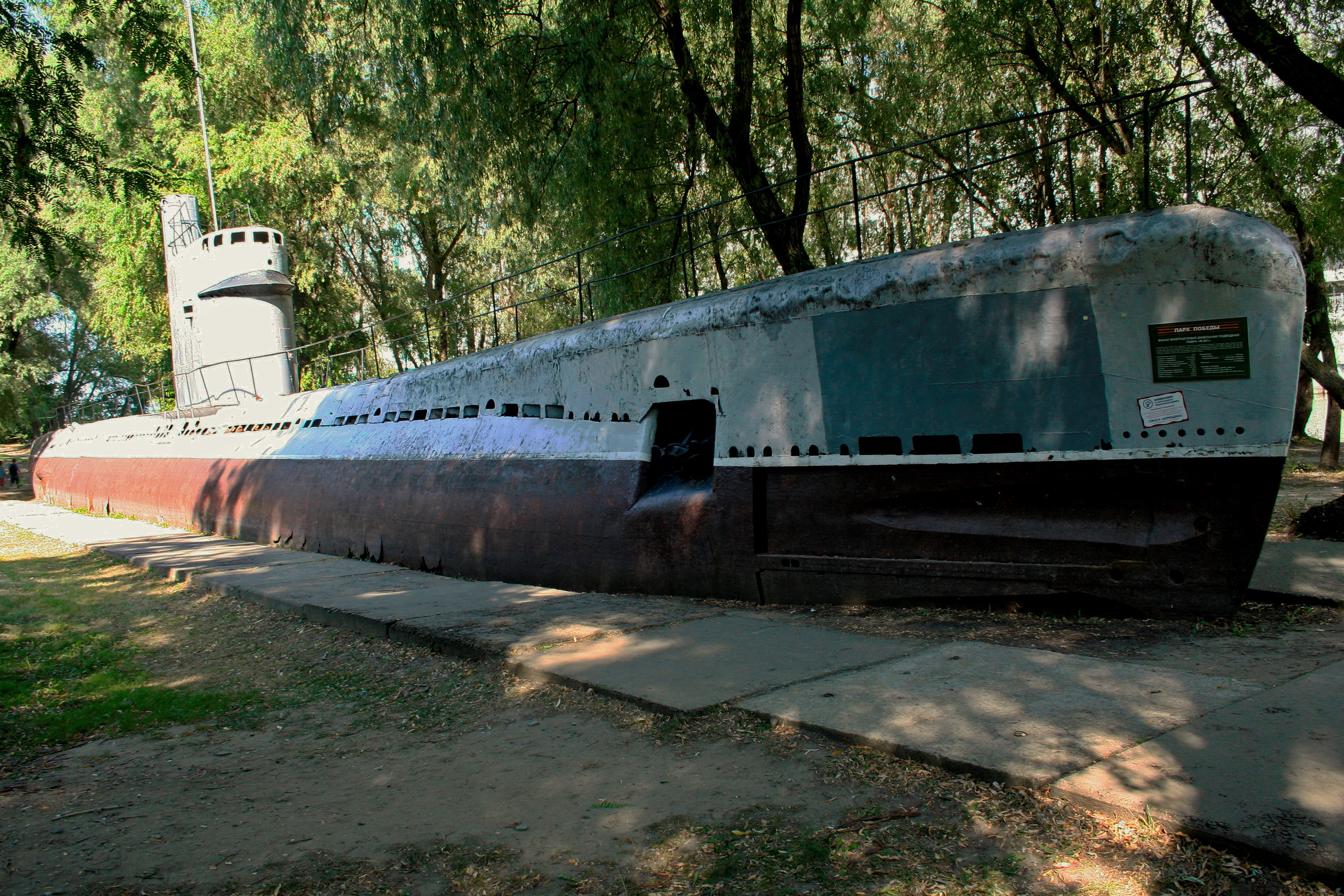
M 261 on display at Museum of military technologies Oruzhie Pobedy

== Service ==
Thirty units were built between 1952 and 1957 of the 100 planned before the project was abandoned and the Soviet Union developed nuclear-powered boats. The last ones were retired in the 1970s.

A unit, M-261 is on display in Krasnodar in Russia and another, M-296 re-christened as M-305 in Odesa, Ukraine.
