= India-class submarine =

Underwater rescue submarine class

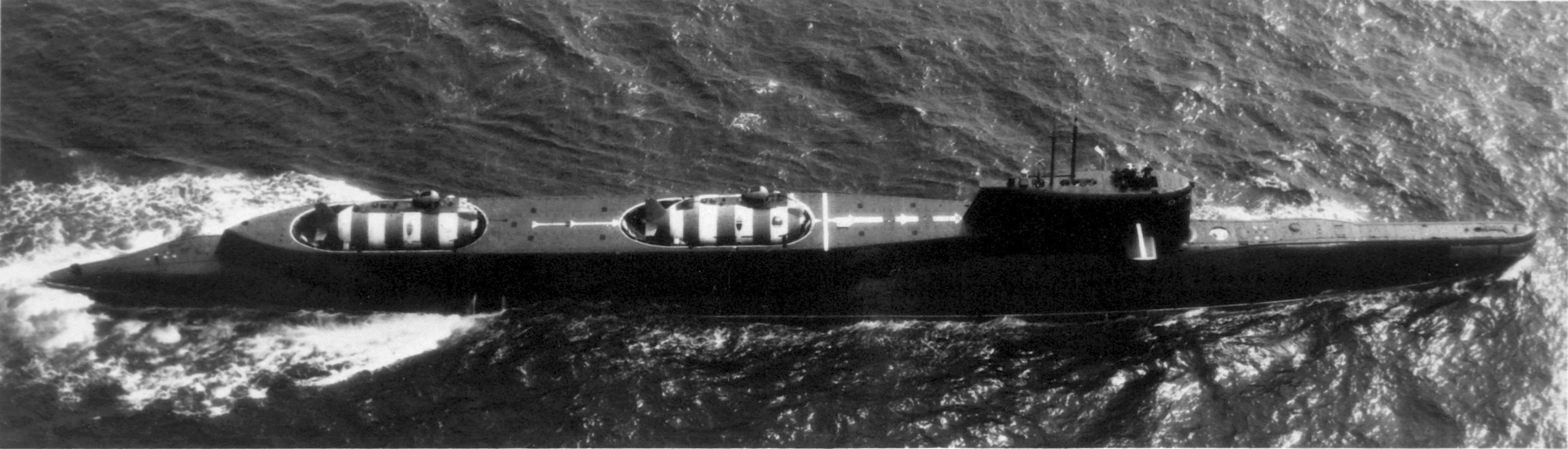
- An India-class submarine carrying two DSRVs in 1985

Class overview
- Operators: Soviet Navy
- Completed: 2
- Retired: 2

General characteristics
- Type: Submarine
- Displacement: 3,900 long tons (3,963 t) surfaced; 4,800–6,840 long tons (4,877–6,950 t) submerged
- Length: 106 m (347 ft 9 in)
- Beam: 9.7 m (31 ft 10 in)
- Draught: 10 m (32 ft 10 in)
- Propulsion: Diesel-electric, twin screws
- Speed: 15 knots (28 km/h; 17 mph) surfaced; 10 knots (19 km/h; 12 mph) submerged
- Boats & landing craft carried: 2 × India-class DSRVs
- Complement: 94 (including 17 officers, 21 divers, 8 DSRV pilots)

The Project 940 Lenok class (a type of salmon) (known in the West by its NATO reporting name India class) was a rescue submarine design of the Soviet Union. Two vessels of this class were built for the Soviet Navy; both were scrapped in the 2000s.

The submarines of this class were designed to function as mother ships for two India-class deep-submergence rescue vehicles (DSRVs), and had decompression chambers and medical facilities on board. While India-class boats were seen going to the aid of Russian submarines involved in incidents, they had also been observed working in support of Russian Spetsnaz operations.

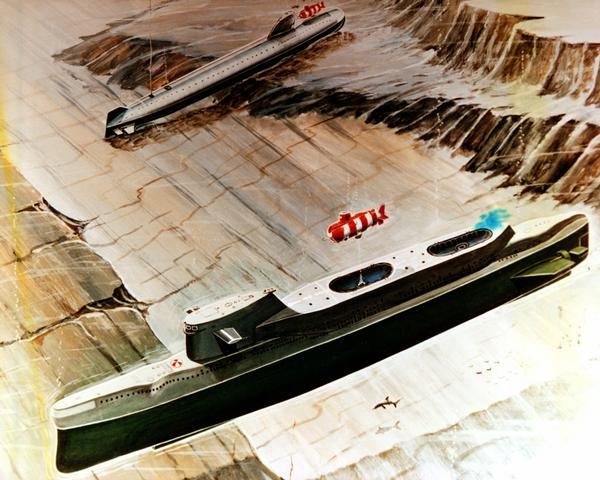
Artist's concept of an India-class submarine deploying a deep submergence rescue vehicle to assist a November-class submarine

Shadowgraph of an India-class submarine with two DSRVs

== Units ==
#	Name	Image	Building number	Laid down	Launched	Commissioned	Fleet	Status
BS-486	BS-486 (ex-Komsomolets Uzbekistana)	BS-486	194	22 February 1974	7 September 1975	30 December 1980	Pacific	Decommissioned 1995, scrapped in 2000
BS-257	BS-257	BS-257	195	23 February 1978	27 May 1979	1 September 1979	Northern	Decommissioned 1996, scrapped in 2005

== Bibliography ==
- Friedman, Norman (1995). "Soviet Union 1947–1991: Russian Federation and Successor States 1991–". In Chumbley, Stephen (ed.). Conway's All the World's Fighting Ships 1947–1995. Naval Institute Press. pp. 337–426. ISBN 1-55750-132-7.
- Pavlov, A. S. (1997). Warships of the USSR and Russia 1945–1995. Naval Institute Press. ISBN 1-55750-671-X.
- Polmar, Norman & Noot, Jurrien (1991). Submarines of the Russian and Soviet Navies, 1718–1990. Naval Institute Press. ISBN 0-87021-570-1.
- Polmar, Norman (2026). Submarines of the Russian and Soviet Navies: 1946–2026. Schiffer Publishing. ISBN 978-0-7643-7083-0.
