= Losos-class submarine =

Class of Soviet midget submarines

- Losos-class submarine

Class overview
- Builders: Shipyard "Leningradskoe Admiralteyskoe Obedinenie" (Admiralteyskie Verfi), Saint Petersburg (Leningrad)
- Operators: Soviet Navy; Russian Navy
- In service: 1982-1997
- Planned: 6
- Completed: 2
- Canceled: 4
- Laid up: 2

General characteristics
- Displacement: 218 tons surfaced, 390 tons submerged
- Length: 28.2 m (92 ft 6 in)
- Beam: 4.8 m (15 ft 9 in)
- Draught: 5.1 m (16 ft 9 in)
- Depth: Operational: 240 m (787 ft 5 in); Maximum: 300 m (984 ft 3 in)
- Installed power: Diesel-electric
- Propulsion: diesel electric, 2 diesel – 160 kW (210 hp); propulsion motor – 60 kW (80 hp)
- Speed: 6.65 knots (12.32 km/h; 7.65 mph) (submerged); 6.43 knots (11.91 km/h; 7.40 mph) (surfaced)
- Endurance: 10 days
- Test depth: 200 m (660 ft)
- Complement: 9
- Electronic warfare & decoys: Active/passive radar and sonar
- Armament: 2 mine-laying devices or 2 torpedoes

Project 865 Piranha (Russian: Проект 865 «Пиранья») is a type of Russian (formerly Soviet) midget submarine. The NATO reporting name for the class is Losos, which means "salmon" in the Russian language.

The Losos class was designed for special operations and engaging surface ships located offshore, and is thus very durable and almost completely silent.

The hull is made of a titanium alloy, which helps with signature management because it is not magnetic. The non-magnetic alloy would greatly reduce the effectiveness of enemy magnetic anomaly detectors or magnetic limpet mines against this type of vessel.

Only two Losos-class submarines were built: MS-520 and MS-521. Original planning called for a total of 12 Project 865 Piranha submarines to be constructed; this was eventually reduced to six, then just the two. Launched in 1982 and 1996, respectively, they are in reserve but are expected to soon be discarded.
