= Soviet submarine K-11 =

Nuclear-powered attack submarine (1961–1990)

- November class submarine

History

Soviet Union
- Name: K-11
- Laid down: 31 October 1960
- Launched: 1 September 1961
- Commissioned: 30 December 1961
- Decommissioned: 19 April 1990
- Status: Laid up as of 2000

General characteristics
- Class & type: November-class submarine
- Displacement: 3065 tonnes surfaced, 4750 tonnes submerged
- Length: 107.4 m (352 ft 4 in)
- Beam: 7.9 m (25 ft 11 in)
- Draught: 5.65 m (18 ft 6 in)
- Propulsion: 2 × 70 MW VM-A reactors
- Speed: 23.3 knots (43.2 km/h; 26.8 mph) surfaced, 30 knots (56 km/h; 35 mph) submerged
- Complement: 104 officers and ratings

Service record
- Part of: Northern Fleet: 3rd division of nuclear submarines of 1st submarine flotilla in 1962–1975 and 17th submarine division of 11th submarine flotilla since 1975.

K-11 was a Soviet November-class (Project 627A) nuclear-powered attack submarine that had two reactor accidents during loading of the nuclear reactor core in Severodvinsk on 7 and 12 February 1965. Reasons for the accidents included nonobservance of operating instructions by those participating in the lift of the reactor cover and the mistaken decision to continue refueling after the first accident. There were no fatalities but those accidents (ejection of radioactive steam and inappropriate fire extinguishing methods on 12 February) caused an unsafe release of radiation into the environment and nearby shipyard area. Seven men were treated for exposure to radiation. The reactor compartment holding the two damaged reactors was removed, partially decontaminated and sunk in Abrosimov Bay (east coast of Novaya Zemlya) in the Kara Sea in 1966. A new reactor compartment was installed and the submarine continued to perform her duties from August 1968 (performed five long-range cruises in 1968–1970 including patrol missions in the Mediterranean Sea, four long-range cruises in 1975–1977, five long-range cruises in 1982–1985) until decommissioning on 19 April 1990. K-11 passed the milestone of 220,179 miles traveled in 1988. The submarine has been laid up in Gremikha Bay since of 2000.
