= K131 =

K131 or K-131 may refer to:

- K-131 (Kansas highway), a state highway in Kansas
- Soviet submarine K-131, a submarine
- K131 jeep, a light utility vehicle
