= Echo-class submarine =

Soviet cruise missile submarine class

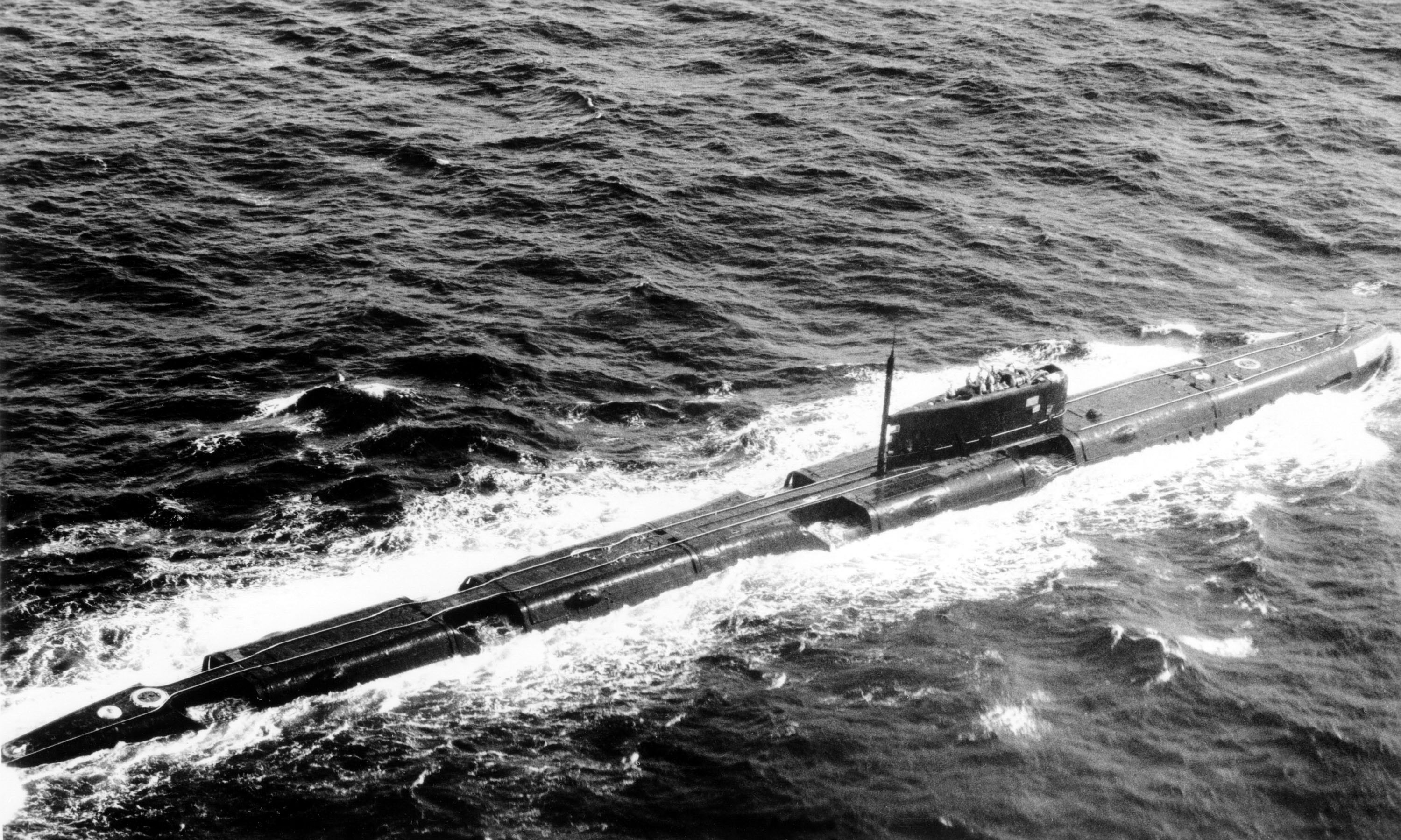
- Nuclear-powered cruise-missile submarine of Project 675 (Echo II)

Class overview
- Builders: Komsomolsk-on-Amur, shipyard No. 199; Severodvinsk, shipyard No. 402
- Operators: Soviet Navy; Russian Navy
- Preceded by: Whiskey Long Bin class
- Succeeded by: Juliett class; Charlie class
- In commission: 19 November 1960–15 July 1994
- Completed: Echo I : 5; Echo II : 29

General characteristics
- Type: Nuclear submarine
- Displacement: Echo I : 3,768 long tons (3,828 t) surfaced; 4,920 long tons (4,999 t) submerged; Echo II : 4,415 long tons (4,486 t) surfaced; 5,760 long tons (5,852 t) submerged
- Length: Echo I : 111.2 m (364 ft 10 in); Echo II : 115.4 m (378 ft 7 in)
- Beam: Echo I : 9.2 m (30 ft 2 in); Echo II : 9.3 m (30 ft 6 in)
- Draught: Echo I : 7.1 m (23 ft 4 in); Echo II : 7.4 m (24 ft 3 in)
- Propulsion: Echo I : 2 pressurized water-cooled reactors 44,500 hp (33 MW) each, 2 steam turbines, 2 shafts; Echo II : 2 pressurized water-cooled reactors 70,000 hp (52 MW) each, 2 steam turbines, 2 shafts
- Speed: Echo I : 15.1 knots (17.4 mph; 28.0 km/h) surfaced; 24.2 knots (27.8 mph; 44.8 km/h) submerged; Echo II : 14 knots (16 mph; 26 km/h) surfaced; 22 knots (25 mph; 41 km/h) submerged
- Range: 18,000–30,000 miles (29,000–48,000 km)
- Endurance: 50 days
- Test depth: 300 m (984 ft)
- Complement: 104-109 men (including 29 officers)
- Armament: Echo I : 6 × P-5 Pyatyorka cruise missiles; 4 × 533 mm (21 in) bow torpedo tubes; 2 × 400 mm (16 in) bow torpedo tubes; 2 × 400 mm (16 in) stern torpedo tubes; Echo II : 8 × P-6 cruise missiles; 4 × 533 mm (21 in) bow torpedo tubes; 2 × 400 mm (16 in) stern torpedo tubes; Echo II mod : P-6 replaced with 8 × P-500 or P-1000 (SS-N-12 "Sandbox") missiles

The Echo class were nuclear cruise missile submarines of the Soviet Navy built during the 1960s. Their Soviet designation was Project 659 for the first five vessels, and Project 675 for the following twenty-nine. Their NATO reporting names were Echo I and Echo II. All were decommissioned by 1994.

== Echo I class ==
The Soviet Echo I class (Project 659 class) were completed at Komsomolsk in the Soviet far east in 1960 to 1963. The Echo I class were classed as SSGNs armed with six launchers for the P-5 Pyatyorka (SS-N-3C, "Shaddock") land-attack cruise missile. The Echo I class had to operate in a strategic rather than anti-shipping role because of the lack of fire control and guidance radars.

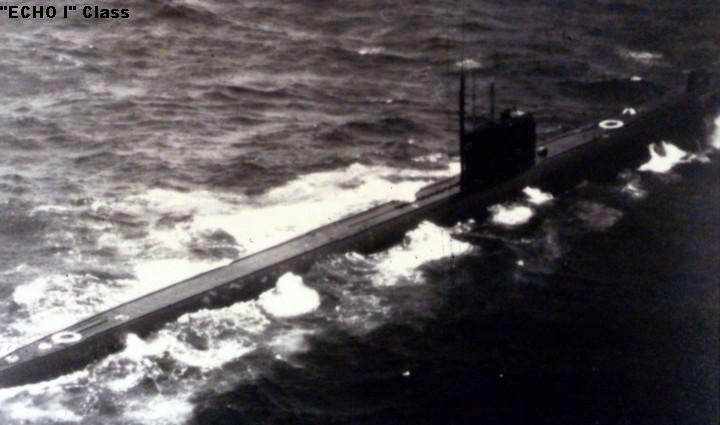
Nuclear-powered submarine of Project 659 (Echo I) re-equipped into attack submarine of Project 659T

Project 659

As the Soviet SSBN force built up, the need for these boats diminished so they were converted to the Project 659T SSNs between 1969 and 1974. The conversion involved the removal of the cruise missiles, the plating over and the streamlining of the hull to reduce underwater noise of the launchers and the modification of the sonar systems to the standard of the November-class SSNs.

All the Echo Is were deployed in the Pacific Fleet. The last two boats were scrapped in the early 1990s.

=== Boats ===
Echo I class — significant dates
#	Shipyard	Laid down	Launched	Commissioned	Fleet	Status
K-45	Leninskiy Komsomol Shipyard, Komsomolsk-na-Amure	December 20, 1958	May 12, 1960	June 28, 1961	Pacific	Decommissioned 1989 for scrapping
K-59	Leninskiy Komsomol Shipyard, Komsomolsk-na-Amure	September 30, 1959	September 25, 1960	December 16, 1961	Pacific	Decommissioned 1989 for scrapping
K-66	Leninskiy Komsomol Shipyard, Komsomolsk-na-Amure	March 26, 1960	July 30, 1961	December 28, 1961	Pacific	Decommissioned 1985 for scrapping
K-122	Leninskiy Komsomol Shipyard, Komsomolsk-na-Amure	January 21, 1961	September 17, 1961	July 6, 1962	Pacific	Decommissioned 1985 for scrapping
K-151	Leninskiy Komsomol Shipyard, Komsomolsk-na-Amure	April 21, 1962	September 30, 1962	July 28, 1963	Pacific	Decommissioned 1989 for scrapping

== Echo II class ==
The Echo II class (Project 675 class) were built at Severodvinsk (18 vessels) and Komsomolsk (11 vessels) between 1962 and 1967 as anti-carrier missile submarines. The Echo II class carried eight P-6 (SS-N-3a "Shaddock") anti-ship cruise missiles mounted in pairs above the pressure hull.

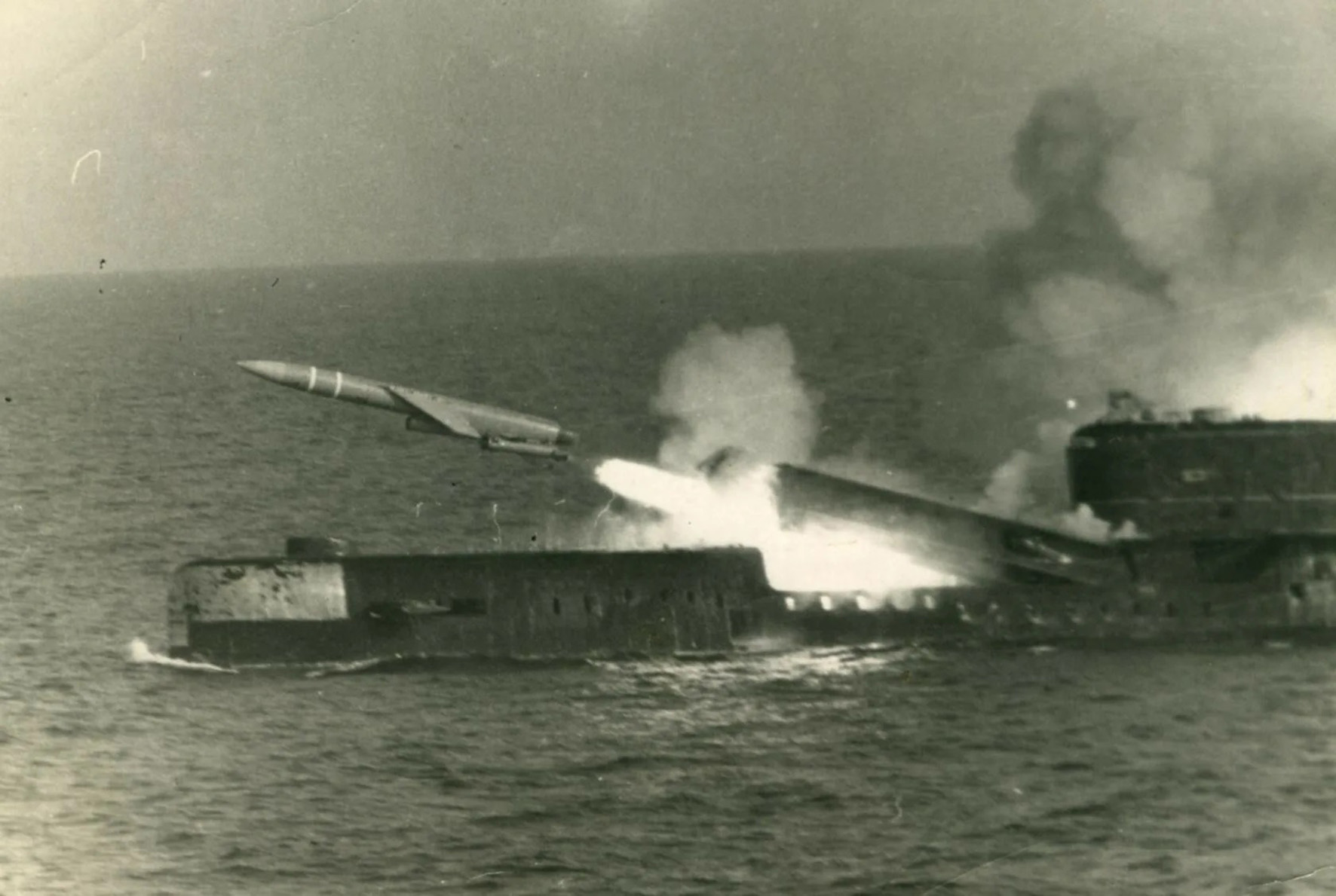
Launch of cruise missile P-6 (SS-N-3A) from a Project 675 (Echo II) submarine

Project 675

To fire the missiles, the ship had to surface and the missile was elevated to 15 degrees. The Echo II class also had fire control and guidance radar. The Echo II class could fire all eight missiles in 30 minutes, but would have to wait on the surface until the missile mid-course correction and final target selection had been sent unless guidance had been handed over to a third party.

From the mid-1970s, fourteen of the 29 Echo II class were converted during overhauls to carry the P-500 Bazalt (SS-N-12 "Sandbox") anti-ship cruise missile, with a range of 550 kilometres (340 mi). The conversions (Project 675M) could be distinguished by the fitting bulges either side of the sail.

Three of these modified units were further upgraded under Project 675MKV towards the end of the Cold War. The P-1000 Vulkan (GRAU 3M70) flew faster (Mach 2.3–2.5) than the P-500 and its range was extended to 700 kilometres (430 mi). It replaced steel components with titanium to reduce weight, and had an improved propulsion system. It appeared to have used a similar fire-control system to the P-500, the Argon-KV and Argument radar. The P-1000 was installed on three units of the Northern Fleet between 1987 and 1993. The conversion of two boats of the Pacific Fleet, K-10 and K-34, was abandoned due to lack of funds.

The Echo II class were divided evenly between the Pacific and Northern Fleets. The boats were obsolete by the mid-1980s, and were dismantled in 1989 and 1995.

=== Boats ===
Echo II class — significant dates
#	Shipyard	Laid down	Launched	Commissioned	Fleet	Status
K-166	SEVMASH, Severodvinsk	May 30, 1961	September 6, 1962	October 31, 1963	Northern	Decommissioned 1989 for scrapping
K-104	SEVMASH, Severodvinsk	January 11, 1962	June 16, 1963	December 15, 1963	Northern	Decommissioned 1990 for scrapping
K-170 (K-86, KS-86)	SEVMASH, Severodvinsk	May 16, 1962	August 4, 1963	December 26, 1963	Northern	Decommissioned 1991 for scrapping
K-175	Leninskiy Komsomol Shipyard, Komsomolsk-na-Amure	March 17, 1962	September 30, 1962	December 30, 1963	Pacific	Decommissioned 1990 for scrapping
K-184	Leninskiy Komsomol Shipyard, Komsomolsk-na-Amure	February 2, 1963	August 25, 1963	March 31, 1964	Pacific	Decommissioned 1990 for scrapping
K-172	SEVMASH, Severodvinsk	August 8, 1962	December 25, 1963	July 30, 1964	Northern	Decommissioned 1990 for scrapping
K-47 (B-47)	SEVMASH, Severodvinsk	August 7, 1962	February 10, 1964	August 31, 1964	Northern	Decommissioned 1994–95 for scrapping
K-1 (1963)	SEVMASH, Severodvinsk	January 11, 1963	April 30, 1964	September 30, 1964	Northern	Decommissioned 1992 for scrapping
K-28 (K-428)	SEVMASH, Severodvinsk	April 26, 1963	June 30, 1964	December 16, 1964	Northern	Decommissioned 1990 for scrapping
K-35	SEVMASH, Severodvinsk	January 6, 1964	January 27, 1965	June 30, 1965	Northern	Decommissioned 1993 for scrapping
K-189 (K-144)	Leninskiy Komsomol Shipyard, Komsomolsk-na-Amure	April 6, 1963	May 9, 1964	July 24, 1965	Pacific	Decommissioned 1991 for scrapping
K-74	SEVMASH, Severodvinsk	July 23, 1963	September 30, 1964	July 30, 1965	Northern	Decommissioned 1992 for scrapping
K-22	SEVMASH, Severodvinsk	October 14, 1963	November 29, 1964	August 7, 1965	Northern	Decommissioned 1995 for scrapping
K-90 (K-111)	SEVMASH, Severodvinsk	February 29, 1964	April 17, 1965	September 25, 1965	Northern	Decommissioned 1989 for scrapping
K-31 (K-431)	Leninskiy Komsomol Shipyard, Komsomolsk-na-Amure	January 11, 1964	September 8, 1964	September 30, 1965	Pacific	Decommissioned 1987 for scrapping
K-116	SEVMASH, Severodvinsk	June 8, 1964	June 19, 1965	October 29, 1965	Pacific	Decommissioned 1985 for scrapping
K-57 (K-557)	Leninskiy Komsomol Shipyard, Komsomolsk-na-Amure	October 19, 1963	September 26, 1964	October 31, 1965	Pacific	Decommissioned 1992 for scrapping
K-125	SEVMASH, Severodvinsk	September 1, 1964	September 11, 1965	December 18, 1965	Northern	Decommissioned 1991 for scrapping
K-48	Leninskiy Komsomol Shipyard, Komsomolsk-na-Amure	April 11, 1964	June 16, 1965	December 31, 1965	Pacific	Decommissioned 1990 for scrapping
K-128 (K-62)	SEVMASH, Severodvinsk	October 29, 1964	December 30, 1965	August 25, 1966	Northern	Decommissioned 1990 for scrapping
K-56	Leninskiy Komsomol Shipyard, Komsomolsk-na-Amure	May 30, 1964	August 10, 1965	August 26, 1966	Pacific	Decommissioned 1992 for scrapping
K-131 (B-131)	SEVMASH, Severodvinsk	December 31, 1964	June 6, 1966	September 30, 1966	Northern	Decommissioned 1994 for scrapping
K-10	Leninskiy Komsomol Shipyard, Komsomolsk-na-Amure	October 24, 1964	September 29, 1965	October 15, 1966	Pacific	Decommissioned 1989 for scrapping
K-135	SEVMASH, Severodvinsk	February 27, 1965	July 27, 1967	November 25, 1966	Northern	Decommissioned 1988 for scrapping
K-94 (K-204)	Leninskiy Komsomol Shipyard, Komsomolsk-na-Amure	March 20, 1965	May 20, 1966	December 27, 1966	Pacific	Decommissioned 1992 for scrapping
K-108	Leninskiy Komsomol Shipyard, Komsomolsk-na-Amure	July 24, 1965	August 26, 1966	March 31, 1967	Pacific	Decommissioned 1990 for scrapping
K-7	Leninskiy Komsomol Shipyard, Komsomolsk-na-Amure	November 6, 1965	September 25, 1966	September 30, 1967	Pacific	Decommissioned 1990 for scrapping
K-23	Leninskiy Komsomol Shipyard, Komsomolsk-na-Amure	February 23, 1966	June 18, 1967	December 30, 1967	Pacific	Decommissioned 1992 for scrapping
K-34 (K-134)	Leninskiy Komsomol Shipyard, Komsomolsk-na-Amure	June 18, 1966	September 23, 1967	December 30, 1968	Pacific	Decommissioned 1994 for scrapping

== Accidents ==
Submarines of the Echo class were involved in several accidents :

20 June 1970
K-108 (Echo II) collided with the submarine USS Tautog in the Sea of Okhotsk at a depth 45 metres (148 ft). The outer hull of K-108 was damaged in the area of compartments VIII and IX, and the sail of Tautog was damaged and the access trunk in it was flooded. There were no fatalities.
14 June 1973
K-56 (Echo II) collided with the Soviet large refrigerating trawler Akademik Berg. The submarine was holed in the bow, and 27 were killed when compartments I and II flooded.
20 August 1973
K-1 (Echo II) struck Hagua Bank (21.5833°N 80.6667°W) in the Caribbean Sea at a depth of 120 metres (390 ft) at 16 knots (30 km/h). The bow was significantly damaged.
28 August 1976
K-22 (Echo II) collided with frigate USS Voge in the Mediterranean Sea (36.0333°N 20.6000°E), and both ships were seriously damaged. K-22 had damage to missile container No. 1, extension devices and the fin structure, and went to Kithira in the Aegean Sea for repairs. The American frigate was damaged at the stern, and had to be towed to Crete.
24 September 1976
K-47 (Echo II) was in the North Atlantic when a fire broke out in compartment VIII (living quarters) due to short circuit. Three were killed by carbon monoxide poisoning.
2 July 1979
K-116 (Echo II) suffered a reactor accident (a leak of core coolant from the port reactor) in the Bay of Vladimir, Sea of Japan. Some of the crew received a large dose of radiation, but there were no fatalities.
21 August 1980
K-122 (Echo I) had a fire in compartment VII (turbo-electric) when 85 miles (137 km) to the east of Okinawa. Fourteen died due to carbon monoxide poisoning.
10 September 1981
K-45 (Echo I) collided with Soviet fishing trawler Novokachalinsk at night. The bow of the outer hull and the sonar system of the submarine were seriously damaged. The trawler sank.
18 June 1984
K-131 (Echo II) was in the Barents Sea when a fire broke out in compartment VIII due to violation of safety methods by an electrician. Fourteen died.
10 August 1985
K-431 (ex-K-31) (Echo II) had a reactor explosion while refueling in the shipyard at Chazhma Bay, Sea of Japan. Ten died as a direct result, while 300 men from rescue parties received various doses of radiation and several died later.
November 1986
K-175 (Echo II), while at its homebase (Pacific Fleet), suffered an explosion in the reactor compartment, causing radioactivity discharge and contamination of nearby territory. There were no fatalities.
1989
K-1 (Echo II mod) had a reactor accident.
26 June 1989
K-192 (ex-K-172) (Echo II) had a reactor accident (a break in the first loop of the starboard reactor) while off Bear Island, Barents Sea. The crew received a dose of radiation, but there were no fatalities.

== See also ==
- 1966 Soviet submarine global circumnavigation
