= Ballistic missile submarine =

Submarine that can launch ballistic missiles

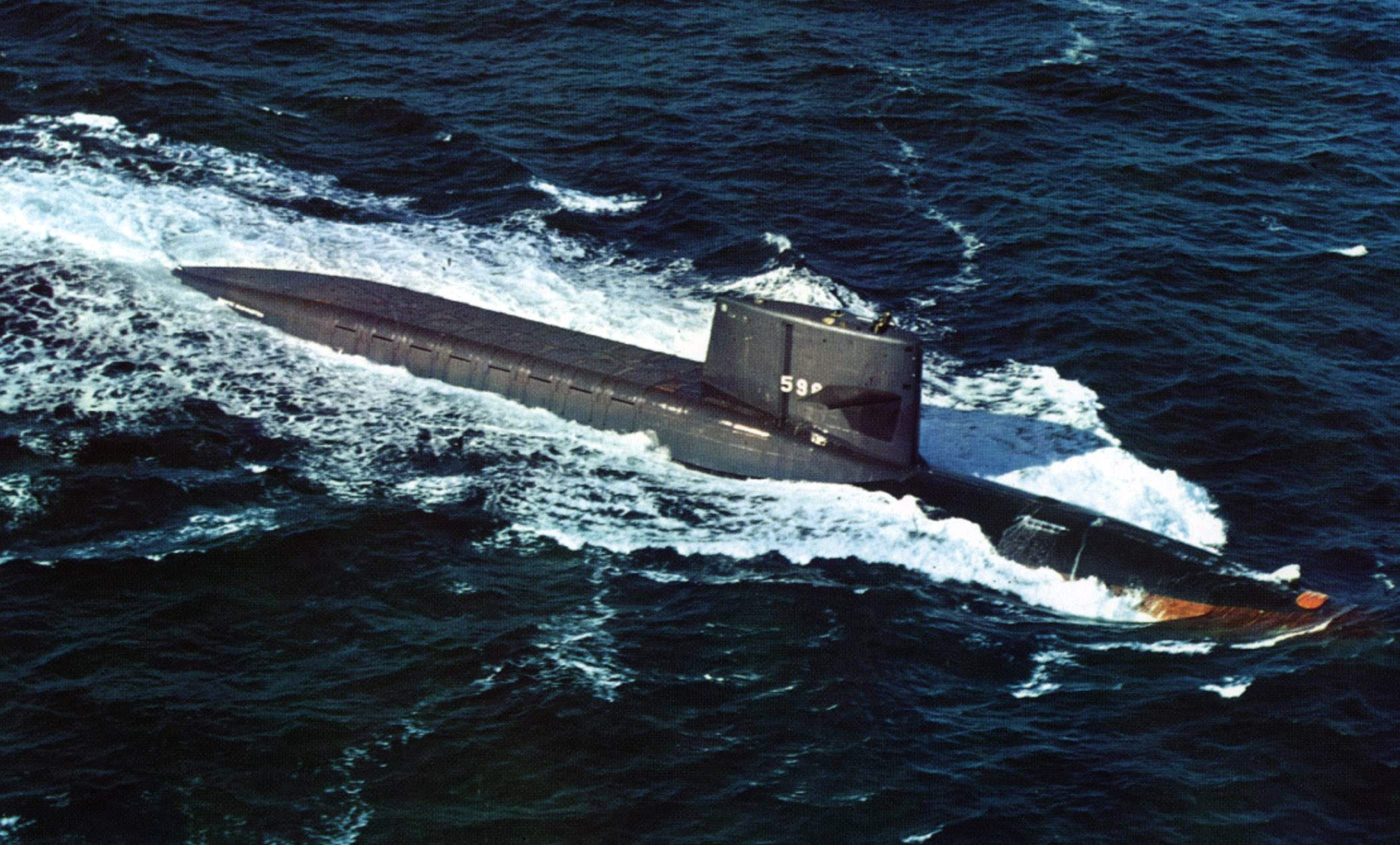
USS George Washington – the lead boat of US Navy's first class of Fleet Ballistic Missile submarines. George Washington was the first operational nuclear-powered multi-missile strategic deterrence asset fielded by any navy.

Type 094 (China)

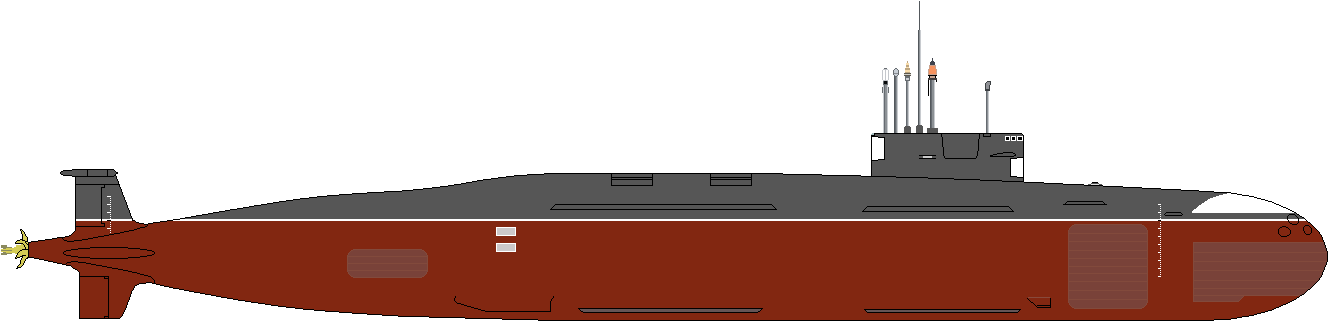
Arihant class (India)

Borei class (Russia)

Ohio class (USA)

Le Triomphant class (France)

Vanguard class (UK)

A ballistic missile submarine is a submarine capable of deploying submarine-launched ballistic missiles (SLBMs) with nuclear warheads. These submarines became a major weapon system in the Cold War because of their nuclear deterrence capability. They can fire missiles thousands of kilometres (miles) from their targets, and acoustic quieting makes them difficult to detect (see acoustic signature), thus making them a survivable deterrent in the event of a first strike and a key element of the mutual assured destruction policy of nuclear deterrence. Many ballistic missile submarine policies also include provisions for nuclear first strike as well. For these reasons, 70% of nuclear warheads in the United States are carried by ballistic missile submarines.

The deployment of ballistic missile submarines is dominated by the United States, Russia (following the collapse of the Soviet Union) and China. Smaller numbers are in service with France, the United Kingdom and India.

North Korea is also suspected to have an experimental submarine that is diesel-electric powered. Israel also has diesel-electric submarines carrying nuclear weapons, however their nuclear warheads are mounted onto cruise missiles, not onto ballistic missiles.

Ballistic missile submarines should be distinguished from so-called nuclear submarines, which does not refer to a submarine carrying nuclear weapons, but instead refers to submarines with a nuclear propulsion engine.

== History ==
The first sea-based missile deterrent forces were a small number of conventionally powered cruise missile submarines and surface ships fielded by the United States and the Soviet Union in the 1950s, deploying the Regulus I missile and the Soviet P-5 Pyatyorka (also known by its NATO reporting name SS-N-3 Shaddock), both land attack cruise missiles that could be launched from surfaced submarines. Although these forces served until 1964 and (on the Soviet side) were augmented by the nuclear-powered Project 659 (Echo I class) cruise-missile submarines, they were rapidly eclipsed by SLBMs carried by nuclear-powered ballistic missile submarines beginning in 1960.

=== Ballistic missile submarine origins ===
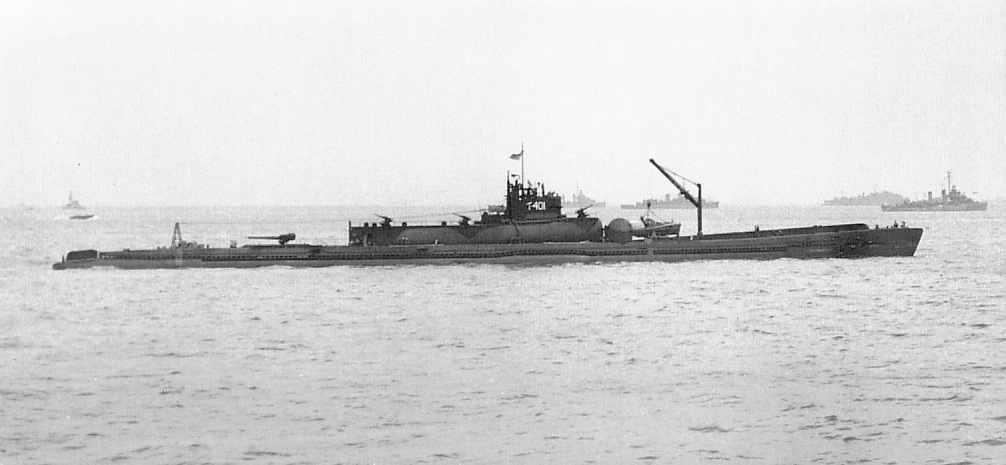
The I-400-class submarines are considered the strategic predecessors to today's ballistic submarines.

The Imperial Japanese Navy I-400-class submarines are considered the strategic predecessors to today's ballistic submarines, especially to the Regulus missile program, which began about a decade after World War II.

During World War II, German researchers developed the A4 (V2), the first ballistic missile. Toward the end of the war, a V2 version was developed at the Peenemünde Army Research Station to be towed in a launch container behind a submarine. Each submarine was to tow up to three of these 36-metre (118 ft) containers, manned by ten soldiers, through the North Sea. Off England, the container would have been brought to the surface and the missiles fired. Prototypes were already being tested on the Baltic coast before the project had to be abandoned in 1945 with the evacuation of Peenemünde. Three containers were already under construction at that time. The commander of the Army Experimental Station, Walter Dornberger, described the project as "not unpromising".

The first nation to field ballistic missile submarines was the Soviet Union, whose first experimental vessel was a converted Project 611 (Zulu IV class) diesel-powered submarine equipped with a single ballistic missile launch tube in its sail. This submarine launched the world's first SLBM, an R-11FM (SS-N-1 Scud-A, naval modification of SS-1 Scud) on 16 September 1955.

Five additional Project V611 and AV611 (Zulu V class) boats became the world's first operational ballistic submarines with two R-11FM missiles each, entering service in 1956–57. They were followed by a series of 23 specifically designed Project 629 (Golf class) boats, completed 1958–1962, with three vertical launch tubes incorporated in the sail/fin of each submarine. The initial R-13 (SS-N-4) ballistic missiles could only be launched with the submarine on the surface and the missile raised to the top of the launch tube, but were followed by R-21 (SS-N-5) missiles beginning in 1963, which were launched with the submarine submerged.

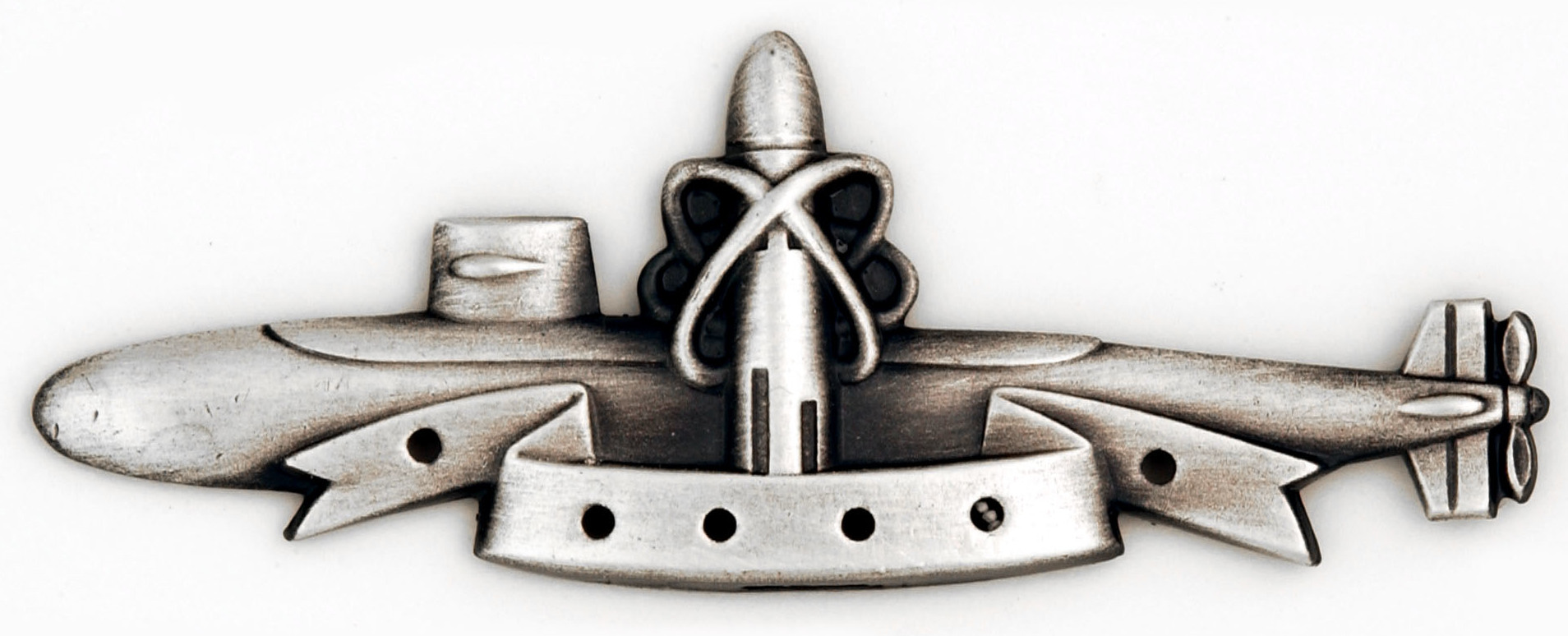

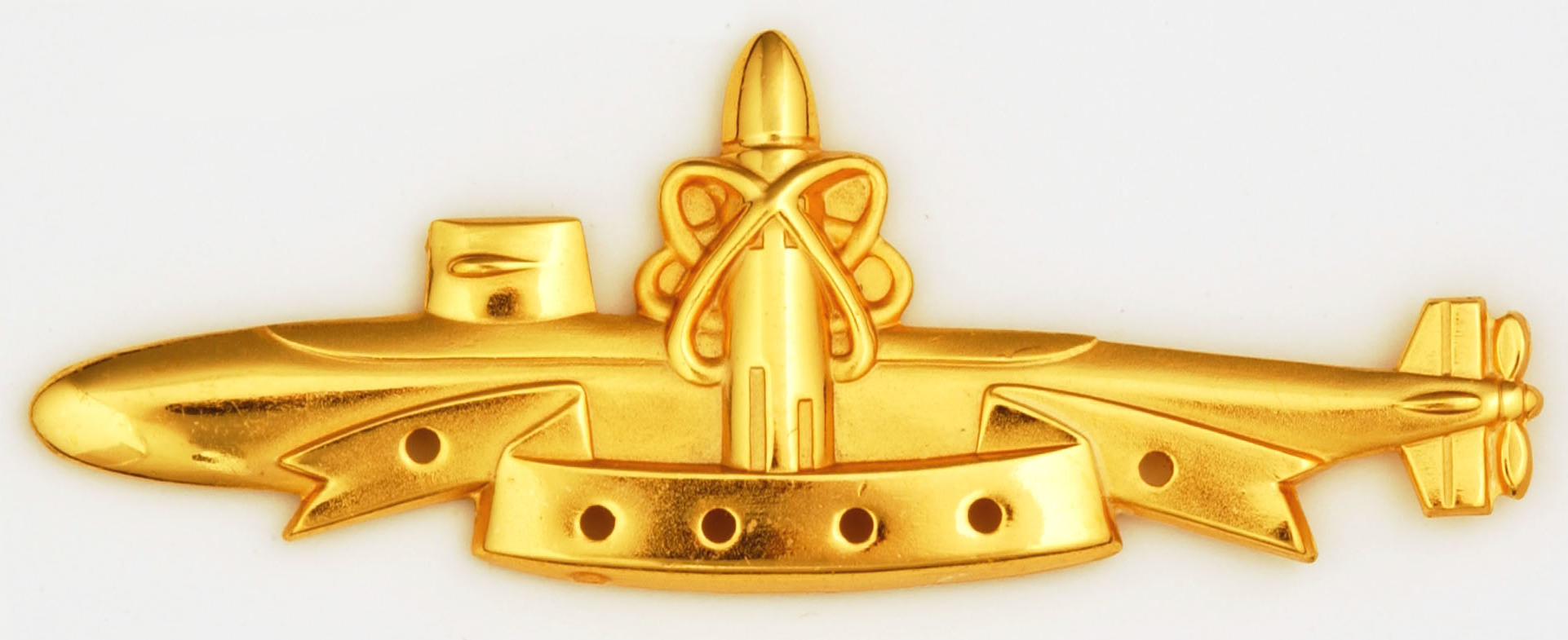
SSBN Deterrent Patrol insignia, in silver and gold, awarded by the US Navy to sailors who completed at least one SSBN patrol

The world's first operational nuclear-powered ballistic missile submarine was USS George Washington (SSBN-598) with 16 Polaris A-1 missiles, which entered service in December 1959 and conducted the first SSBN deterrent patrol November 1960 – January 1961. (The United States Navy's hull classification symbols for nuclear ballistic missile submarines are SSBN – the SS denotes submarine, the B denotes ballistic missile, and the N denotes that the submarine is nuclear powered.) The Polaris missile and the first US SSBNs were developed by a Special Project office under Rear Admiral W. F. "Red" Raborn, appointed by Chief of Naval Operations Admiral Arleigh Burke. George Washington was redesigned and rebuilt early in construction from a Skipjack-class fast attack submarine, USS Scorpion, with a 130 ft (40 m) missile compartment welded into the middle. Nuclear power was a crucial advance, allowing a ballistic missile submarine to remain undetected at sea by remaining submerged or occasionally at periscope depth (50 to 55 ft (15 to 17 m)) for an entire patrol.

A significant difference between US and Soviet SLBMs was the fuel type; all US SLBMs have been solid fueled while all Soviet SLBMs before 1980 were liquid fueled. The USSR and subsequently Russia deployed three different SLBM types with solid fuel (R-31 in 1980, R-39 Rif in 1983, and RSM-56 Bulava in 2018). However, these did not replace liquid-fueled SLBMs in service, and new liquid-fueled SLBMs were developed and introduced (R-29RM introduced in 1986, R-29RMU introduced in 2007) after deployment of the R-31 and R-39.

With more missiles on one US SSBN than on five Golf-class boats, the Soviets rapidly fell behind in sea-based deterrent capability. The Soviets were only a year behind the US with their first nuclear powered ballistic missile boat, the ill-fated K-19 of Project 658 (Hotel class), commissioned in November 1960. However, this class carried the same three-missile armament as the Golfs. The first Soviet nuclear submarine with 16 missiles was the Project 667A (Yankee class), the first of which entered service in 1967, by which time the US had already commissioned 41 SSBNs, nicknamed the "41 for Freedom".

The United Kingdom's first nuclear ballistic missile submarine was the Resolution-class of four submarines built for the Royal Navy as part of the UK Polaris programme. The first to be completed was Resolution, laid down in February 1964 and launched in September 1966. After commissioning in 1967, a period of sea trials followed, culminating in the test firing of a Polaris missile from the USAF Eastern Test Range off Cape Kennedy in February 1968. Resolution commenced her first operational patrol in June 1968.

France's first nuclear ballistic submarine followed very closely. The first French SLBM submarine, Le Redoutable was laid down in 1964 in Cherbourg and launched in March 1967. Le Redoutable entered operational service in December 1971 and was the first of a series of six ships, with a 7,500-ton displacement and equipped with 16 French-made M1 missiles.

=== Deployment and further development ===
The short range of the early SLBMs dictated basing and deployment locations. By the late 1960s the UGM-27 Polaris A-3 missile was deployed on all US and UK ballistic missile submarines. Its range of 4,600 kilometres (2,500 nmi) was a great improvement on the 1,900-kilometre (1,000 nmi) range of Polaris A-1. The A-3 also had three warheads that landed in a pattern around a single target. The Yankee class was initially equipped with the R-27 Zyb (SS-N-6) missile with a range of 2,400 kilometres (1,300 nmi).

The US was much more fortunate in its basing arrangements than the Soviets. Thanks to NATO and the US possession of Guam, US SSBNs were permanently forward deployed at Advanced Refit Sites in Holy Loch, Scotland and Rota, Spain for Atlantic and Mediterranean areas, and Guam for the Pacific areas, by the middle 1960s resulting in short transit times to patrol areas near the Soviet Union. With two rotating crews per SSBN, about one-third of the total US force could be in a patrol area at any time. The Soviet bases, in Severomorsk near Murmansk for the Atlantic and the Petropavlovsk-Kamchatsky area for the Pacific, required their submarines to make a long transit through NATO-monitored waters in the Atlantic to their mid-ocean patrol areas to hold the Continental United States (CONUS) at risk.

US SSBN submarine missions usually last for approximately ninety days (the maximum duration is limited by the supply of food and other consumables that can be carried on board, as well as crew endurance, rather than by the amount of the nuclear fuel on board) and occurs with 18 months maintenance and repair breaks. Such a relatively short mission duration resulted in only a small percentage of the Soviet force occupying patrol areas at any time and was a great motivation for longer-range Soviet SLBMs, which would allow them to patrol close to their bases in areas sometimes referred to as "deep bastions". The missiles were the R-29 Vysota series (SS-N-8, SS-N-18, SS-N-23), equipped on Projects 667B, 667BD, 667BDR, and 667BDRM (Delta I through Delta IV classes). The SS-N-8, with a range of 7,700 kilometres (4,200 nmi), entered service on the first Delta-I boat in 1972, before the Yankee class was even completed. A total of 43 Delta-class boats of all types entered service 1972–1990, with the SS-N-18 on the Delta III class and the R-29RM Shtil (SS-N-23) on the Delta IV class. The new missiles had increased range and eventually Multiple Independently Targeted Re-entry Vehicles (MIRV), multiple warheads that could each hit a different target.

The Delta I class had 12 missiles each; the others have 16 missiles each. All Deltas have a tall superstructure (aka casing) to accommodate their large liquid-fueled missiles.

=== Poseidon and Trident I ===
Although the US did not commission any new SSBNs from 1967 through 1981, they did introduce two new SLBMs. Thirty-one of the 41 original US SSBNs were built with larger diameter launch tubes with future missiles in mind. In the early 1970s the Poseidon (C-3) missile entered service, and those 31 SSBNs were backfitted with it. Poseidon offered a massive MIRV capability of up to 14 warheads per missile. Like the Soviets, the US also desired a longer-range missile that would allow SSBNs to be based in CONUS. In the late 1970s the Trident I (C-4) missile was backfitted to 12 of the Poseidon-equipped submarines. The SSBN facilities of the base at Rota, Spain were disestablished and the Naval Submarine Base King's Bay in Georgia was built for the Trident I-equipped force.

=== Trident and Typhoon submarines ===
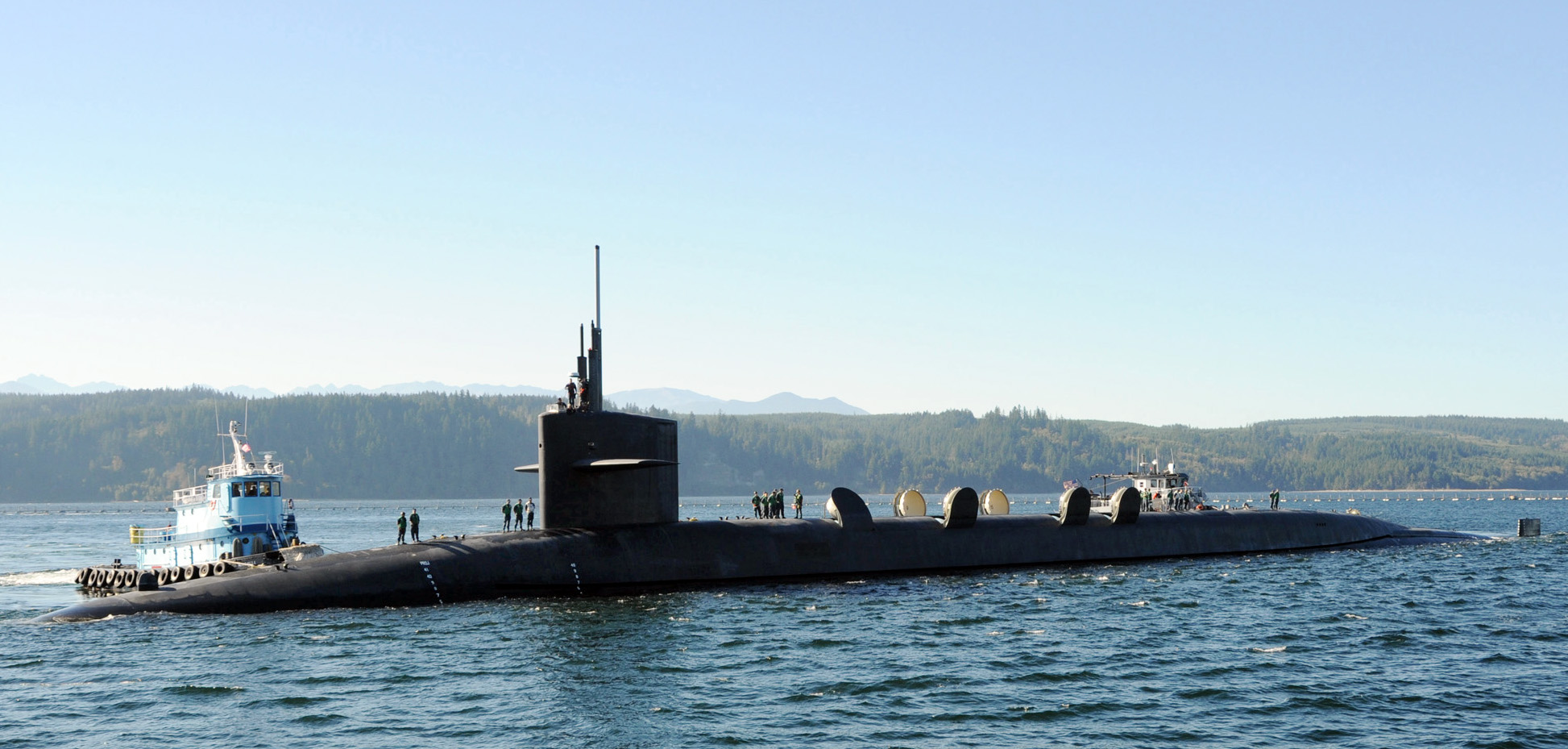
USS Alabama, an Ohio-class (aka Trident) submarine

Both the United States and the Soviet Union commissioned larger submarines designed for new missiles in 1981. The American large SSBN was the Ohio class, also called the "Trident submarine", with the largest SSBN armament ever of 24 missiles, initially Trident I but built with much larger tubes for the Trident II (D-5) missile, which entered service in 1990. The entire class was converted to use Trident II by the early 2000s. When the USS Ohio commenced sea trials in 1980, two US Benjamin Franklin-class SSBNs had their missiles removed to comply with SALT treaty requirements; the remaining eight were converted to attack submarines (SSN) by the end of 1982. These were all in the Pacific, and the Guam SSBN base was disestablished; the first several Ohio-class boats used new Trident facilities at Naval Submarine Base Bangor, Washington. Eighteen Ohio-class boats were commissioned by 1997, four of which were converted to cruise missile submarines (SSGN) in the 2000s to comply with START I treaty requirements.

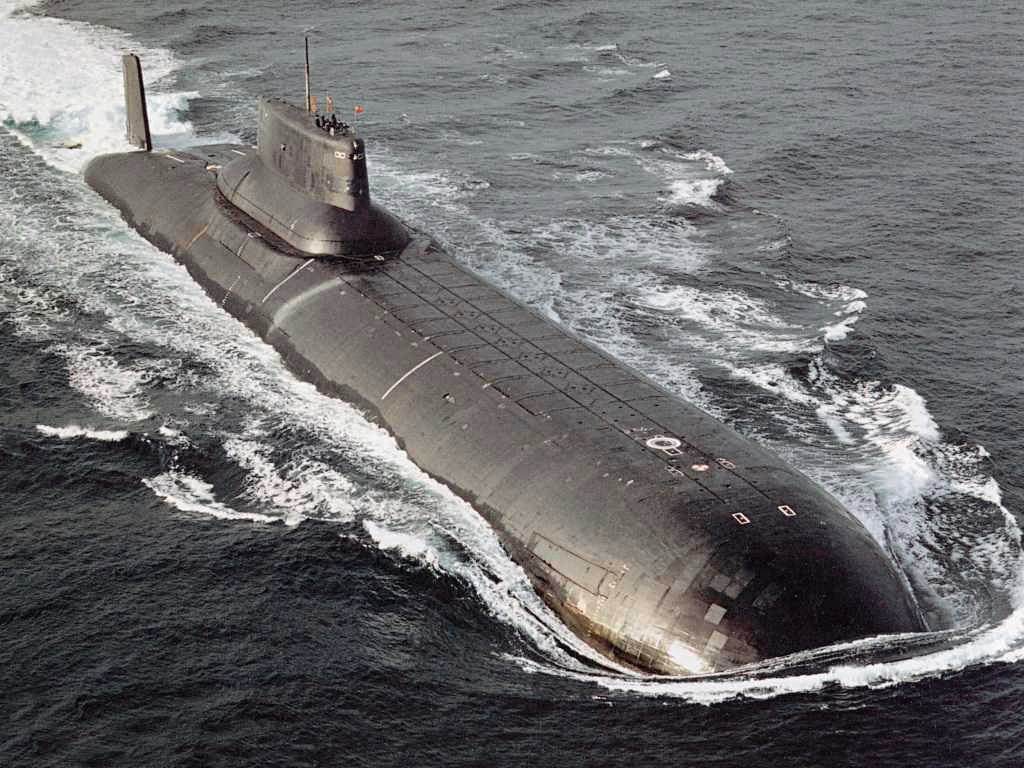
A Project 941 (Typhoon-class) nuclear ballistic missile submarine

The Soviet large nuclear ballistic missile submarine was the Project 941 Akula, more famously known as the Typhoon class (and not to be confused with the Project 971 Shchuka attack submarine, called "Akula" by NATO). The Typhoons were the largest submarines ever built, at 48,000 tons submerged (more than 2½ times the displacement of the Ohio-class). They were armed with 20 of the new R-39 Rif (SS-N-20) missiles. Six Typhoons were commissioned 1981–1989.

The United Kingdom commissioned the 15,600-ton Vanguard-class submarine in 1993, to carry up to 16 Trident II missiles. France commissioned in 1997 the 12,600-ton Le Triomphant class, equipped with up to 16 French-made M45 missiles.

=== Post-Cold War ===
With the collapse of the Soviet Union and the end of the Cold War in 1991, construction of new nuclear submarines by Russia was put on hold for over ten years and was slowed in the United States. Additionally the US rapidly decommissioned its 31 older remaining SSBNs, with a few converted to other roles, and the base at Holy Loch in Scotland was disestablished. Most of the former Soviet nuclear submarine force was gradually scrapped under the provisions of the Nunn–Lugar Cooperative Threat Reduction agreement through 2012.

The Russian ballistic missile submarine force then stood at six Delta IVs, three Delta IIIs, and a lone Typhoon used as a testbed for new missiles (the R-39s unique to the Typhoons were reportedly scrapped in 2012). Upgraded missiles such as the R-29RMU Sineva (SS-N-23 Sineva) were developed for the Deltas. In 2013 the Russians commissioned the first Borei-class submarine, also called the Dolgorukiy class after the lead vessel. By 2015 two others had entered service. This class is intended to replace the aging Deltas, and carries 16 solid-fuel RSM-56 Bulava missiles, with a reported range of 10,000 kilometres (5,400 nmi) and six MIRV warheads. The US Columbia-class submarine is set to replace the Ohio-class, with construction beginning in 2020.

The United Kingdom and France are set to replace in the early 2030s their current fleets composed respectively of Vanguard and Le Triomphant with third generation Dreadnought and unnamed SNLE 3G SLBMs.

In 2009, India launched the first of its indigenously built Arihant-class submarines. The submarines are armed with K15 and K-4 ballistic missiles. Follow on variants with longer range ballistic missiles called K-5 and K6 are in works.

North Korea test-fired ballistic missiles from submarines in 2021 and 2022.

== Purpose ==
Ballistic missile submarines differ in purpose from attack submarines and cruise missile submarines. Attack submarines specialize in combat with other vessels (including enemy submarines and merchant shipping), and cruise missile submarines are designed to attack large warships and tactical targets on land. However, the primary mission of the ballistic missile boat is nuclear deterrence. They serve as the third leg of the nuclear triad in countries that also operate nuclear-armed land based missiles and aircraft. Accordingly, the mission profile of a ballistic missile submarine concentrates on remaining undetected, rather than aggressively pursuing other vessels.

Ballistic missile submarines are designed for stealth to avoid detection at all costs, and that makes nuclear power, allowing almost the entire patrol to be conducted submerged, very important. They also use many sound-reducing design features, such as anechoic tiles on their hull surfaces, carefully designed propulsion systems, and machinery mounted on vibration-damping mounts. The invisibility and mobility of nuclear ballistic missile submarines offer a reliable means of deterrence against an attack (by maintaining the threat of a second strike), as well as a potential surprise first strike capability.

== Armament ==
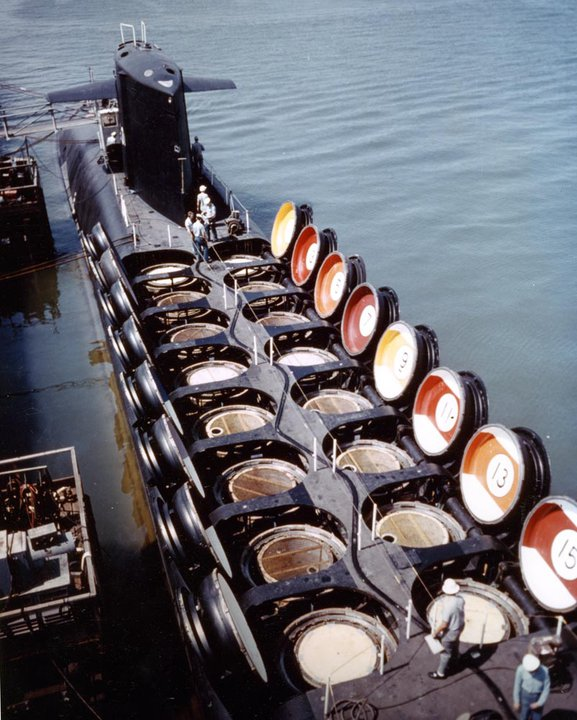
USS Sam Rayburn showing the hatches for the UGM-27 Polaris missiles

In most cases, nuclear ballistic missile submarines generally resemble attack subs of the same generation, with extra length to accommodate SLBMs, such as the Russian R-29 (SS-N-23) or the NATO-fielded and American-manufactured Polaris, Poseidon, and Trident-II missiles. Some early models had to surface to launch their missiles, but modern vessels typically launch while submerged at keel depths of usually less than 50 metres (160 ft). Missiles are launched upwards with an initial velocity sufficient for them to pop above the surface, at which point their rocket motors fire, beginning the characteristic parabolic climb-from-launch of a ballistic missile. Compressed air ejection, later replaced by gas-steam ejection, was developed by Captain Harry Jackson of Rear Admiral Raborn's Special Project Office when a proposed missile elevator proved too complex. Jackson also derived the armament of 16 missiles used in many SSBNs for the George Washington class in 1957, based on a compromise between firepower and hull integrity.

== Terminology and locations ==
=== United States and United Kingdom ===
In the US Navy, SSBNs are sometimes called Fleet Ballistic Missile submarines, or FBMs. In US naval slang, ballistic missile submarines are called boomers. In the UK, they are known as bombers. In both cases, SSBN submarines operate on a two-crew concept, with two complete crews – including two captains – called Gold and Blue in the United States, Starboard and Port in the United Kingdom. The designation SSBN is also used throughout NATO under STANAG 1166.

=== France ===
The French Navy commissioned its first ballistic missile submarines as SNLE, for Sous-marin Nucléaire Lanceur d'Engins (lit. "nuclear-powered device-launching submarines"). The term applies both to ballistic missile submarines in general (for instance "British SNLE" occurs) and, more technically, as a specific classification of the Le Redoutable class. Its successor, the Le Triomphant class, is referred to as SNLE-NG (Nouvelle Génération, "New Generation"). The two crews used to maximise the availability time of the boats are called bleu (blue) and rouge (red) crews.

=== Soviet Union and Russian Federation ===
The Soviets called this type of ship RPKSN (lit. "Strategic Purpose Underwater Missile Cruiser"). This designation was applied to the Typhoon class. Another designation used was PLARB(«ПЛАРБ» – подводная лодка атомная с баллистическими ракетами, which translates as "Nuclear Submarine with Ballistic Missiles"). This designation was applied to smaller submarines such as the Delta class. After a peak in 1984 (following Able Archer 83), Russian PLARB deterrence patrols have declined to the point where there is less than one patrol per sub each year and at best one sub on patrol at any time. Hence the Russians did not use multiple crews per boat. However, the situation changed ca. 2008, when, first time in years, Russia had 10 submarine missile cruisers on patrol. One of these submarines was Ryazan, that travelled fully submerged under an icesheet from Severomorsk base on the Barentz Sea to Vladivostok on the Sea of Japan in just one month.

=== India ===
India classifies this type of a submarine as a Strategic Strike Nuclear Submarine.

=== Summary ===
Where ballistic missile submarines are made and stationed
Country	Constructed	Stationed	Ref.
China	Bohai Shipyard, Huludao	Longpo Naval Base (Formerly Yulin East), Jianggezhuang Naval Base	
France	Cherbourg	Brest	
India	Shipbuilding Centre (SBC)	INS Varsha	
Russia	Severodvinsk	Severomorsk	
Russia	Komsomolsk-na-Amure	Petropavlovsk-Kamchatskiy	
UK	BAE Systems Submarines	HMNB Clyde, Scotland	
United States	Quonset Point, Rhode Island	Naval Submarine Base Kings Bay, GA	
United States	Groton, CT	Naval Base Kitsap, WA	

== Active classes ==
Map showing submarine operators (green) and ballistic missile submarine operators (orange)

Nuclear powered ballistic missile submarine:

- China
  - Type 094 submarine – 6 in service.
- France
  - Le Triomphant class – 4 in service.
- India
  - Arihant class – 3 in service, 1 in sea trials.
- Russia
  - Borei class – 8 in service. additional 2 under construction & 2 planned.
  - Delta class – 5 Delta IV class in service (2 additional Delta III/IV in special operations or attack role).
- United Kingdom
  - Vanguard class – 4 in service.
- United States
  - Ohio class – 14 in service (4 others have been converted into cruise missile submarines).

AIP based ballistic missile submarine:

- North Korea
  - North Korean submarine Hero Kim Kun Ok
- South Korea (non-nuclear-armed)
  - KSS-III submarine – 3 in service (total 9 planned).

== Classes under development ==
- France
  - L'Invincible class (SNLE 3G) – 4 planned.
- China
  - Type 096
- (India) India
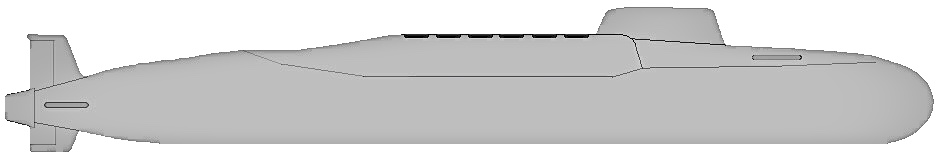
  S5-class submarine
  - S5 class – 2 under construction; 4 planned.
- United Kingdom
  - Dreadnought class – 4 under construction.
- United States
  - Columbia class - 1 under construction, 12 planned.
- Russia
  - Arcturus class

== Retired classes ==
- France
  - Le Redoutable class
- / Soviet Union / Russia
  - Zulu V class (with a single Zulu IV prototype) (diesel powered)
  - Golf I class (diesel powered)
  - Golf II class (diesel powered)
  - Hotel I class
  - Hotel II class
  - Yankee class
  - Yankee II class
  - Delta I class
  - Delta II class
  - Typhoon class
- United Kingdom
  - Resolution class
- United States
  - George Washington class
  - Ethan Allen class
  - Lafayette class
  - James Madison class
  - Benjamin Franklin class
  These five classes are collectively referred to as "41 for Freedom".

== Accidents ==
On 4 February 2009, the British HMS Vanguard and the French Le Triomphant collided in the Atlantic. Vanguard returned to Faslane in Scotland, under her own power, and Le Triomphant to Île Longue in Brittany.

== See also ==
- List of submarine classes in service
- American naval ballistic systems
