= 1966 Soviet submarine global circumnavigation =

- Part of the Cold War (1962–1979)
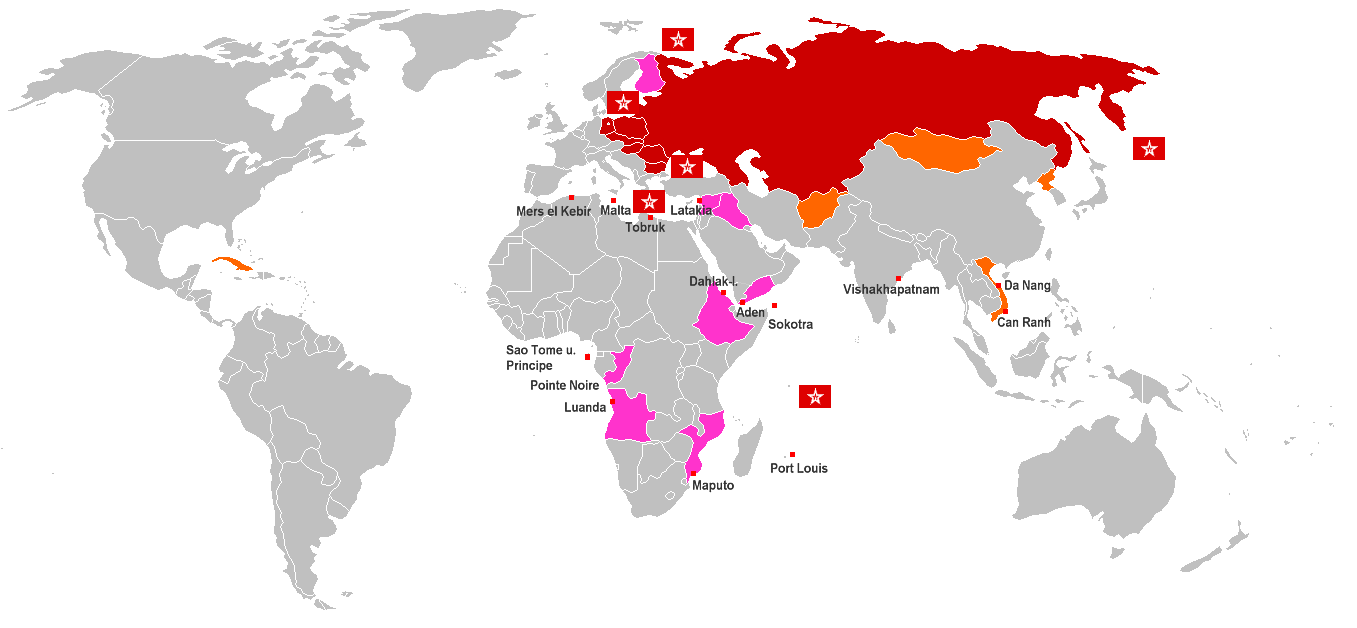
- Soviet Navy's overseas bases as part of the power projection.
- Type: Nuclear submarine operation
- Location: Worldwide
- Planned by: Soviet Navy
- Commanded by: Counter-Admiral Anatoly Sorokin
- Objective: Submerged circumnavigation of the globe the detachment (otryad) of two nuclear-powered submarines
- Date: 1 February 1966 to 26 March 1966
- Executed by: K-133 ҝит, K-116
- Outcome: Mission successfully accomplished

The 1966 Soviet submarine global circumnavigation (Russian: Подводная кругосветка советских атомоходов), was announced to be the second submerged around-the-world voyage executed by the detachment of the nuclear powered submarines that served in the Soviet Navy.

The expedition was an early example of blue-water operations and the power projection of the Soviet Union through its Navy's nuclear-powered submarine fleet, and it paved the way for future operations during the latter half of the Cold War. The Soviet expedition took place nearly six years after the first complete submerged circumnavigation of the world undertaken by the U.S. Navy's nuclear-powered submarine Triton in 1960.

Technically speaking, this Soviet submerged circumnavigation was not a true "circumnavigation" inasmuch as the submarine detachment went from the Soviet's Northern Fleet in the area of the Kola Peninsula to the Pacific Fleet base in Kamchatka going around South America, and hence had not gone completely around the world as had the USS Triton.

== Background ==
The Soviet Union took the significantly different approach for the development of its nuclear submarine program from the route undertook by the United States for their submarine program. While the first generation U.S. Navy's nuclear submarines were experimental vessels that could carry out operational missions, the Soviet Navy opted for the immediate series production for its ballistic missile submarine introducing the Hotel, Echo, and November classes (NATO names), that featured the vertical launching system platform which were known collectively as the HEN classes. While more capable in many respects than early U.S. nuclear submarines, early Soviet nuclear submarines also experienced significant problems with their reactor plants, and remedial action was required to correct these technical deficiencies.

Consequently, the Soviet Navy could not deploy any nuclear-powered submarines in support of Operation Anadyr, the Soviet nuclear-armed ballistic missile build-up in Cuba which caused the Cuban Missile Crisis of 1962.

== Operational summary ==
The first submerged circumnavigation by a detachment (Russian: отряд; otryad) of submarines was undertaken by two submarines under the overall command of Rear Admiral Anatoliy Ivanovich Sorokin. The detachment departed from the Red Banner Northern Fleet on 1 February 1966. Planning for the mission was credited to Admiral Vladimir Chernavin, then the commander of a Northern Fleet division of submarines and later to become Commander-in-Chief of the Soviet Navy. The detachment's sailing orders from the Main Naval Staff read in part:

Project 627 (November-class) submarine

Project 675 (Echo II-class) submarine

You will be passing through seas and oceans where Russian sailors have not traveled in more than 100 years. We firmly believe that you will successfully surmount all difficulties and carry the Soviet Navy Flag with honor through three oceans and many seas.

The detachment consisted of the Project 627 (November-class) attack submarine K-133 under the command of Captain 2nd Rank V.T. Vinogradov and the Project 675 (Echo II-class) cruise missile submarine K-116 under the command of Captain 2nd Rank L.N. Stolyarov, with K-116 serving as the detachment's flagship. The oceanographic salvage ship Polyus escorted the submarines during their transit.

The detachment crossed the Barents Sea, the Norwegian Sea, the Atlantic Ocean, and the Pacific Ocean via the Drake Passage which, according to Academian A.M. Chepurov, was the most dangerous phase of the voyage. Concerns included icebergs and collisions with whales. The ships' personnel participated in line-crossing ceremonies when the detachment crossed the Equator. They also celebrated the landing of the Soviet space probe Venera 3 on the surface of the planet Venus. The detachment completed its circumnavigation by arriving at the Pacific Fleet submarine base in Vilyuchinsk on 26 March 1966, having covered 21,000 nmi (39,000 km; 24,000 mi) in 52 days. The detachment reportedly encountered numerous U.S. naval vessels during its around the world voyage, but successfully avoided detection.

== Aftermath ==
The circumnavigation served an immediate political purpose because the mission was dedicated to the 23rd Congress of the Communist Party of the Soviet Union. The voyage provided a showcase for the capabilities of the Soviet Navy's nuclear submarine fleet as well as the professionalism of its personnel. Approximately one-third of the detachment personnel were members of Communist Party of the Soviet Union, and the rest were Komsomol members. Scientific studies were carried out during the voyage. Shipboard systems, tactical coordination, communications, and training were also carried out under a variety of climatic conditions. The timing of circumnavigation's completion coincided with discussions regarding the upcoming Five-Year Defense Plan. Minister of Defense Rodion Malinovsky addressed the 23rd Congress on 2 April 1966:

In recent years, the number of long cruises by our nuclear submarines have increased by 5-fold and they have clearly demonstrated the capability of our glorious sailors to successfully carry out any mission in the ocean expanses from the Arctic to Antarctic. Several days ago an around-the-world cruise by a group of nuclear submarines traveling submerged was successfully concluded.

The announcement was reportedly "greeted with stormy applause." Admiral Sorokin was awarded the title of Hero of the Soviet Union from Nikolai Podgorny, the Chairman of the Presidium of the Supreme Soviet. K-133 commander Vinogradov, chief engineer S.P. Samsonov, and three other participants were awarded the titles of Heroes of the Soviet Union. The New York Times reported the voyage in the following UPI dispatch dated 8 April 1966:

A squadron of nuclear-powered Soviet missile submarines kept a close watch on American planes and ships encountered during a recent around-the-world voyage, Krasnaya Zvezda said today. An officer who made the six-week tour as a special correspondent reported in the Defense Ministry newspaper that American planes and ships were detected several times. "Every time the necessary measures were taken on board the atomic submarines," he said. On one occasion, when his submarine rose to periscope depth, he said, a United States plane was sighted and "we dived lower so as not to whet the appetites of the antisubmarine forces of the imperialists." "Of course, we had nothing to be afraid of," he added. "We crossed the seas and oceans strictly observing the international rules of navigation"

The unnamed naval officer cited in the above article was undoubtedly Captain 2nd Rank G.A. Savichek.

== Legacy ==
While this submerged circumnavigation by a group of submarines received little notice outside of Soviet naval circles, Soviet nuclear submarine operations took on an increasingly blue-water orientation. In 1968, a November-class submarine successfully tracked a carrier task group led by the nuclear aircraft carrier Enterprise much to the surprise of U.S. naval intelligence. Also, the Soviet Navy deployed its first true nuclear-powered ballistic missile submarine, the Yankee class, which began its first nuclear deterrence patrol in June 1969.

Project 667A (Yankee-class) submarine

A detachment of two nuclear submarines, one of them a ballistic missile submarine, subsequently undertook a second around-the-world voyage, departing from the Barents Sea on January 5, 1976, and following a route similar to the one taken in 1966. The detachment commander, Captain 1st Rank Valentin Y. Sokolov, was personally selected by Admiral Sergey Gorshkov, the Commander-in-Chief of the Soviet Navy, to command this detachment. This strategic deterrence patrol included operations in the North Atlantic. During its transit of the South Pacific, the detachment discovered a previously unknown ocean current. The detachment transferred to the Kamchatka Flotilla of the Soviet Pacific Fleet after 70 days at sea.

For the Soviet Navy itself, its blue-water aspirations culminated in OKEAN, a 1970 worldwide naval exercise. This feat was replicated with OKEAN 75, a three-week follow-up held in April–May 1975. Soviet Defense Minister Andrey Grechko declared:

The Okean maneuvers were evidence of the increased naval might of our socialist state, an index of the fact our Navy has become so great and strong that it is capable of executing mission in defense of our state interests over the broad expanses of the World Oceans.

The impact of this Soviet naval expansion was summarized by Admiral of the Fleet Sir Peter Hill-Norton, RN, the chairman of NATO's military staff committee, who observed: "The U.S. had never previously faced a global threat to its sea-lane communications from a mix of subsurface, surface and maritime-air naval forces. This is a strategic change of kind, not of degree."

== See also ==
- Operation Sandblast
- Operation Sea Orbit
- First Russian circumnavigation

== Bibliography ==
- Chepurov, A.M. (1999). "Underwater navigation round the World". History. Official Russian Navy Website. Archived from the original on 17 February 2010.
- Filimoshin, M.V. (February 1986). "Account of 1966 Submarine Circumnavigation of Glode" (PDF). USSR Report: Military History Journal (in Russian). Washington, DC: Foreign Broadcast Information Service. pp. 57–60. JPRS-UMA-86-046. Archived from the original (PDF) on June 5, 2011. "originally published in Military History Journal No. 2, February 1986"
- Karmaza, Oleg (April 8, 1992). "1976 SSBN Deployment Along U.S. Coast Recalled" (PDF). Central Eurasia: Military Affairs (in Russian). Washington, DC: Foreign Broadcast Information Service. pp. 32–35. JPRS-UMA-92-012. Archived from the original (PDF) on June 5, 2011.
- Polmar, Norman; Jurrien Noot (1993). Submarines of the Russian and Soviet Navies, 1718-1990. Annapolis, Maryland: Naval Institute Press. ISBN 0-87021-570-1.
- ——; Moore, J.K. (2004). Cold War Submarines: The Design and Construction of U.S. and Soviet Submarines (Paperback ed.). Washington, DC: Potomac Books. ISBN 1-57488-530-8.
- Studenikin, Lt. Col. (April 1986). "Historic Submarine Circumnavigation Recounted" (PDF). USSR Report: Military History Journal (in Russian). Washington, DC: Foreign Broadcast Information Service. pp. 86–88. JPRS-UMA-86-037. Archived from the original (PDF) on June 5, 2011.
- Weir, Gary E.; Walter J. Boyne (2003). Rising Tide: The Untold Story of the Russian submarines that fought the Cold War. New York, New York: Basic Books. ISBN 0-465-09112-1.
