= Soviet submarine K-8 =

November-class submarine

Coordinates: 46°N 6°W

History

Soviet Union
- Name: K-8
- Commissioned: 31 August 1960
- Fate: Sank 12 April 1970 in the Bay of Biscay

General characteristics
- Class & type: November-class submarine
- Displacement: 3065 tonnes surfaced, 4750 tonnes submerged
- Length: 107.4 m (352 ft)
- Beam: 7.9 m (26 ft)
- Draught: 5.65 m (18.5 ft)
- Propulsion: 2 × 70 MW VM-A reactors
- Speed: 23.3 knots (43.2 km/h; 26.8 mph) surfaced, 30 knots (56 km/h; 35 mph) submerged
- Complement: 104 officers and men

K-8 was a November-class submarine of the Soviet Northern Fleet that sank in the Bay of Biscay with her nuclear weapons on board on April 12, 1970. A fire on April 8 had disabled the submarine and it was being towed in rough seas. Fifty-two crewmen were killed attempting the salvage of the submarine when it sank.

== Accidents ==
=== 1960 loss of coolant ===
On 13 October 1960, while operating in the Barents Sea, K-8 suffered a ruptured steam generator tube, causing a loss-of-coolant accident. While the crew jury-rigged a system to supply emergency cooling water to the reactor, preventing a reactor core meltdown, large amounts of radioactive gas leaked out which contaminated the entire vessel. The gas radiation levels could not be determined because instrumentation could not measure such large scales. Three of the crew suffered visible radiation injuries, and many crewmen were exposed to doses of up to 1.8–2 Sv (180–200 rem).

=== 1970 Bay of Biscay fire ===
During the large-scale "Ocean-70" naval exercise, K-8 suffered fires in two compartments simultaneously on 8 April 1970. Due to short circuits that took place in III and VII compartments simultaneously at a depth of 120 metres (390 ft), a fire spread through the air-conditioning system. Both nuclear reactors were shut down.

The captain ordered his entire crew to abandon ship but was countermanded once a towing vessel arrived. Fifty-two crewmen, including the commander, Captain 2nd Rank Vsevolod Bessonov, re-boarded the surfaced submarine that was to be towed. This was the first loss of a Soviet nuclear-powered submarine, which sank in rough seas as it was being towed in the Bay of Biscay of the North Atlantic Ocean. Eight sailors had already died due to certain compartments being locked to prevent further flooding as well as the spread of the fire as soon as it was detected. All hands on board died due to carbon monoxide poisoning and the flooding of the surfaced submarine during 80 hours of damage control in stormy conditions. Seventy-three crewmen survived. K-8 sank with four nuclear torpedoes out of total 24 on board to a depth of 4,680 metres (15,350 ft) approximately 490 kilometres (260 nmi) northwest of Spain.

== See also ==
- List of military nuclear accidents
- List of sunken nuclear submarines
