= Soviet submarine K-131 =

Echo II-class nuclear-powered guided missile submarine

History

Soviet Union
- Name: K-131
- Laid down: 31 December 1964
- Launched: 6 June 1966
- Commissioned: 30 September 1966
- Decommissioned: 1994 renamed K-192
- Status: Laid up; awaiting scrapping

General characteristics
- Class & type: Echo II-class submarine
- Displacement: 5,000 long tons (5,080 t) surfaced; 6,000 long tons (6,096 t) submerged
- Length: 115 m (377 ft 4 in)
- Beam: 9 m (29 ft 6 in)
- Draught: 7.5 m (24 ft 7 in)
- Propulsion: 2 × pressurized water nuclear reactors, 30,000 shp (22,400 kW) turbines, two shafts
- Speed: 20 knots (37 km/h; 23 mph) surfaced; 23 knots (43 km/h; 26 mph) submerged
- Complement: about 90 officers and men
- Armament: 8 × SS-N-3 "Shaddock" cruise missiles; 6 × 21 in (533 mm) torpedo tubes forward; 4 × 16 in (406 mm) torpedo tubes aft

Echo II-class submarine

K-131 was a Project 675 (NATO reporting name Echo II-class submarine) of the Soviet Navy's Northern Fleet.

== Design and description ==
The Echo II class was a nuclear-powered cruise-missile submarine, which could carry up to eight anti-ship missiles, designed to strike any aircraft carrier-borne nuclear threat. The missiles could be either conventional or nuclear and all eight fired within twenty minutes. The submarine would need to be surfaced and carried an array of electronics, radar and sonar to feed data to the missile while en route to its target. K-131 also had six 533 mm (21 in) torpedo tubes forward and four 406 mm (16 in) torpedo tubes aft.

With a displacement of 5,000 tons when surfaced and 6,000 tons when submerged, K-131 was 115 metres (377 ft) long and had a beam of 9 metres (30 ft) and a draft of 7.5 metres (25 ft). She was powered by two pressurized-water nuclear reactors generating 30,000 shaft horsepower (22,000 kW) through two propellers for a maximum speed of 20 to 23 knots (37 to 43 km/h; 23 to 26 mph). She was crewed by about 90 crew members.

== Operational history ==
=== Collision ===
On 9 October 1968, while under the command of Captain Vladimir Petrovich Shekhovtsov, K-131 sustained a collision to her ventral aft section by the sail of the Royal Navy submarine HMS Warspite. The Warspite had been engaged in a clandestine data collection program, studying the acoustic profile and physical design of the other submarine. An abrupt reduction of speed by the K-131 caused the Warspite to accidentally collide. Little is known about the damage sustained by the K-131, beyond the basic facts such as violent shaking and listing to starboard, and damage being relatively minor.

=== Fire ===
On 18 June 1984, while under the command of Captain First Rank E. Selivanov, K-131 suffered a catastrophic fire while on patrol in the Norwegian Sea off the Kola Peninsula. A short circuit in an electrical switchboard in the eighth compartment ignited the clothes of an electrical officer, and spread first to other equipment in that compartment, then into the seventh compartment. Before it was extinguished, the fire had killed 13 men.

The fire affected one of the two reactors, forcing the submarine to surface. Using K-131's fresh water supplies, the submarine's crew managed to reduce the temperature in the burning compartments from 150 °C (302 °F) to 108 °C (226 °F), but by this time the Soviet cargo ship Konstantin Yuon had arrived and hooked up a pipe to help. All the cooling water went into the ocean, and its radioactivity levels were unknown. The service ship Amur, which had a nuclear waste processing plant on board, then arrived to assist K-131. However, the heavily contaminated water caused Amur′s treatment plant to break down. How much nuclear waste leaked into the ocean has never been fully verified. The immobilized submarine was subsequently towed to Vidyayevo naval base by tugboat SB-38 (Project 733S).

== Fate ==
After returning to the Soviet Union, K-131 was anchored in Ara Bay. Then she was towed to Russian Shipyard No. 10—Shkval.

On June 25, 1989, a serious leak occurred in a cooling pipe of K-192 submarine of the same type (former K-172). Photos of the evaporating cooling water coming out from the reactor compartment became front-page news in Norway where it was stated as K-131. The submarine was then stationed at the Ara-guba Naval base on the Kola Peninsula. At the end of November 1996 the Naval Yard in Polyarny defuelled the 27 years old K-131 submarine.

== Bibliography ==
- Polmar, Norman & Noot, Jurrien (1991). Submarines of the Russian and Soviet Navies, 1718–1990. Annapolis, Maryland: Naval Institute Press. ISBN 0-87021-570-1.
- Vilches Alarcón, Alejandro A. (2022). From Juliettes to Yasens: Development and Operational History of Soviet Cruise-Missile Submarines. Europe @ War (22). Warwick, UK: Helion & Co. ISBN 978-1-915070-68-5.
