= Vsevolod Bessonov =

Soviet Navy officer

- Born: October 7, 1932; Ivanovskoye, Rylsky District, Kursk Oblast, USSR
- Died: April 12, 1970 (aged 37) Bay of Biscay
- Allegiance: Soviet Union
- Branch: Soviet Navy
- Service years: 1951-1970
- Rank: Captain 2nd Rank
- Commands: Soviet submarine K-8
- Conflicts: Cold War
- Awards: Hero of the Soviet Union; Order of Lenin; Order of the Red Banner

Vsevolod Borisovich Bessonov (Russian: Все́волод Бори́сович Бессо́нов) (1932—1970) was an officer in the Soviet Navy and commanding officer of the K-8– the Project 627 Kit-class submarine. He was honored with the Hero of the Soviet Union. He died during the sinking of K-8.

== Biography ==
Bessonov joined the Soviet Navy in 1951. He was a torpedo specialist in the submarine arm of the Soviet Northern Fleet and was awarded the order of the Red Banner for taking part in tests on the nuclear-armed torpedo near Novaya Zemlya.

In 1968, Bessonov was appointed second in command of the nuclear-powered submarine K-8. He was made Captain 2nd Rank and commander of this boat in 1970.

In 1970 during the large-scale "Ocean-70" naval exercise, K-8 suffered fires in two compartments simultaneously on 8 April 1970. Due to short circuits that took place in III and VII compartments simultaneously at a depth of 120 m, a fire spread through the air-conditioning system. Both nuclear reactors were shut down.

The captain ordered his entire crew to abandon ship but was countermanded once a towing vessel arrived. 52 crewmen, including her commander, re-boarded the surfaced submarine that was to be towed. This was the first loss of a Soviet nuclear-powered submarine, which sank in rough seas as it was being towed in the Bay of Biscay of the North Atlantic Ocean. All hands on board died due to carbon monoxide poisoning and the flooding of the surfaced submarine during 80 hours of damage control in stormy conditions. 73 crewmen survived. K-8 sank with four nuclear torpedoes on board to a depth of 4,680 metres (15,350 ft) approximately 490 kilometres (300 mi) northwest of Spain.

Bessonov was posthumously awarded the title Hero of the Soviet Union.
