= Draft (hull) =

Depth of a vessel below its waterline

Graphical representation of the waterline of a ship (blue line), absent a lower projecting keel or propeller, with the draft (lower image) indicated as dimension d; for other dimensions used to describe a ship, see also ship measurements.

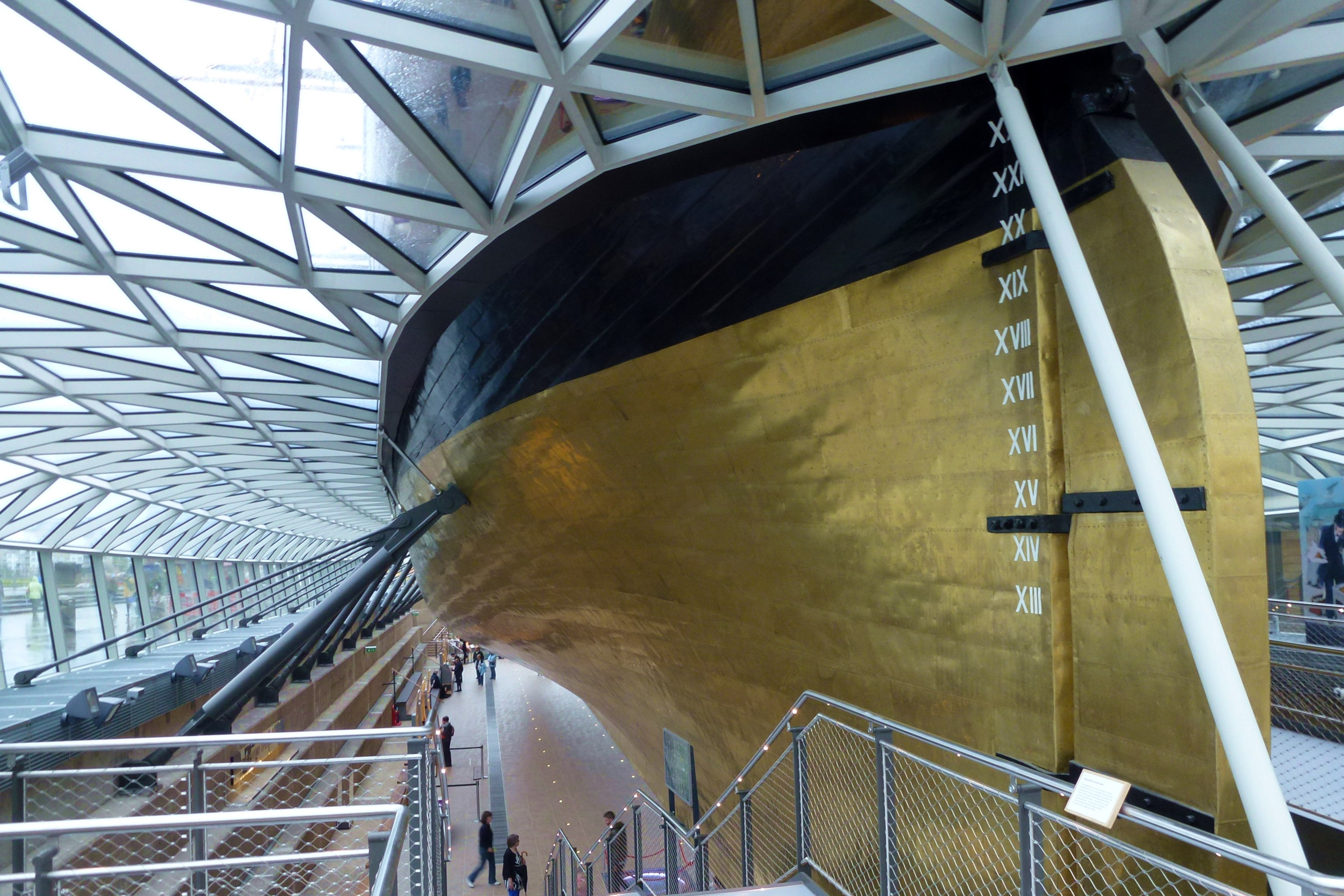
Draft markings on the stern of the Cutty Sark, an example of the Imperial system of such markings.

The draft or draught of a ship is a determined depth of the vessel below the waterline, measured vertically to its hull's lowest point—its propellers, or keel, or other reference point. Draft varies according to the loaded condition of the ship. A deeper draft means the ship will have greater vertical depth below the waterline. Draft is used in under keel clearance calculations, where the draft is calculated with the available depth of water (from Electronic navigational charts) to ensure the ship can navigate safely, without grounding. Navigators can determine their draught by calculation or by visual observation (of the ship's painted load lines).

== Related terminology ==
A ship's draft/draught is the "depth of the vessel below the waterline measured vertically to the lowest part of the hull, propellers, or other reference point". That is, the draft or draught is the maximum depth of any part of the vessel, including appendages such as rudders, propellers and drop keels if deployed. The related term air draft is the maximum height of any part of the vessel above the water.

Draft determines the minimum depth of water a ship or boat can safely navigate in relation to the under keel clearance available. The more heavily a vessel is loaded, the deeper it sinks into the water, and the greater its draft (also referred to as its displacement). After construction, the shipyard creates a table showing how much water the vessel displaces based on its draft and the density of the water (salt or fresh). The draft can also be used to determine the weight of cargo on board by calculating the total displacement of water, accounting for the content of the ship's bunkers, and using Archimedes' principle.

The difference between the forward and aft drafts of a ship is termed its trim.

== Ship draft measurements ==
Metric bow scale

Imperial system in Roman numeration of the bow scale

- The draft aft (stern) is measured at the perpendicular of the stern.
- The draft forward (bow) is measured at the perpendicular of the bow.
- The mean draft is typically calculated from the averaging of the stern and bow drafts, with correction for water level variation and value of the position of forward (F) with respect to the average perpendicular numerical value (given in the ship's drawings or stability manual)) An alternative visual approximation is that given by reading the draught at the waterline, at or very near to amidships.
- The trim of a ship is the difference between the forward and aft drafts relative to the designed waterline. When the aft draft relative to the designed water line (DWL) is greater the vessel is deemed to have a positive trim, or to be trimmed by the stern, and it has a negative trim, or is trimmed by the bow, when the forward draft relative to DWL is the greater. In such a case it may be referred to as being down-by-the-head.

In commercial ship operations, the ship will usually quote the mean draft as the vessel's draft. However, in navigational situations, the maximum draft, usually the aft draft, will be known on the bridge and will be shared with the pilot.

=== Variations ===
The draft of a ship can be affected by multiple factors, besides the variations caused by changes in displacement:

- Variation by trim
- Variation by list
- Variations in water density due to temperature and salinity
- Variation as a result of a ship moving in shallow waters, or squat
- Variation due to movable appendages, such as centreboards, daggerboards, drop keels, leeboards, and retractable rudders
- Projection of non-retractable rudders, propellers or thrusters below the hull

When measured to the lowest projecting portion of the vessel, it is called the "draft, extreme"; when measured at the bow, it is called "draft, forward"; and when measured at the stern, the "draft, aft"; the average of the draft, forward, and the draft, aft is the "draft, mean", and the mean draft when in full load condition is the "draft load".

== Draft marks ==
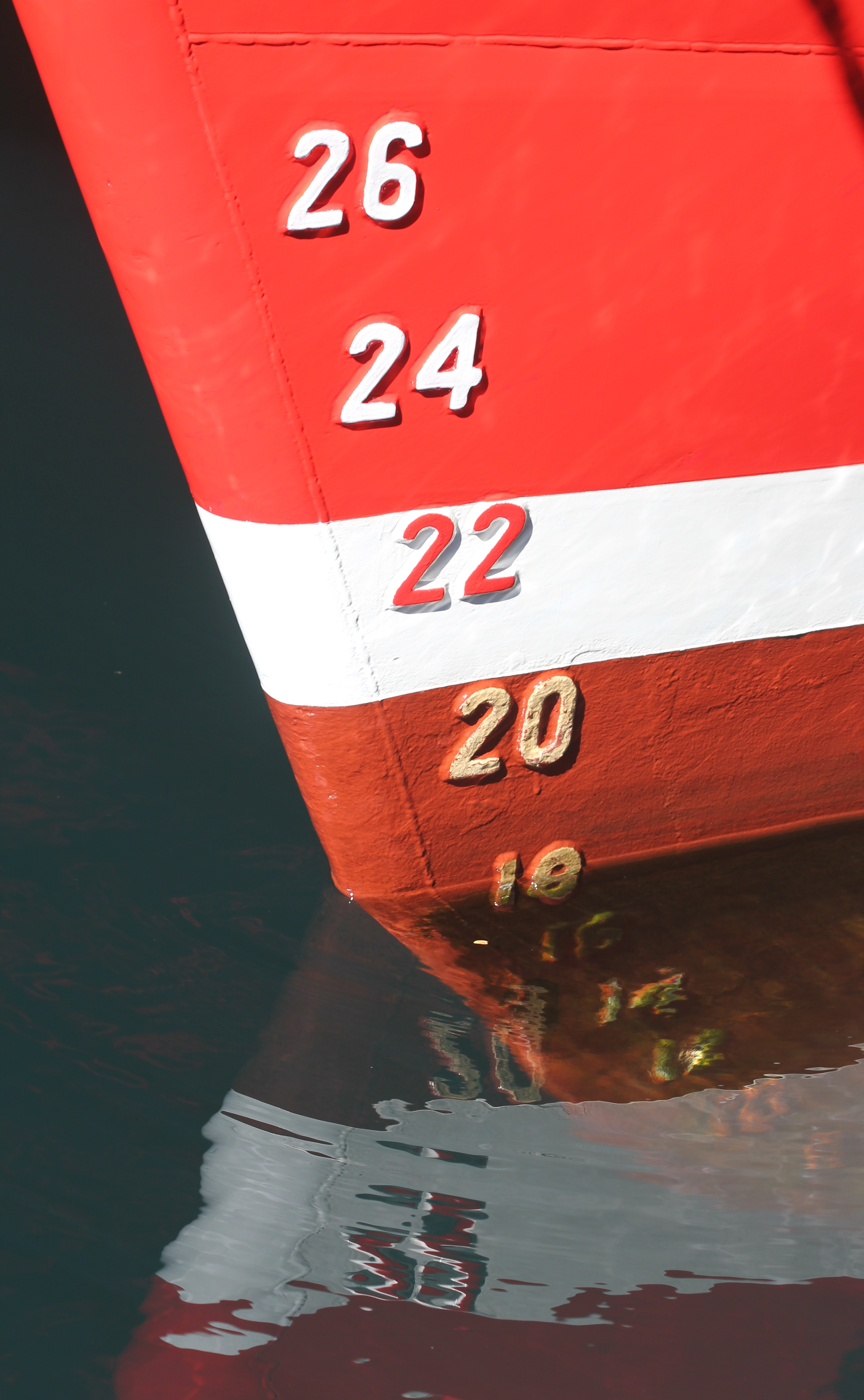
Draft marks on a ship's bow

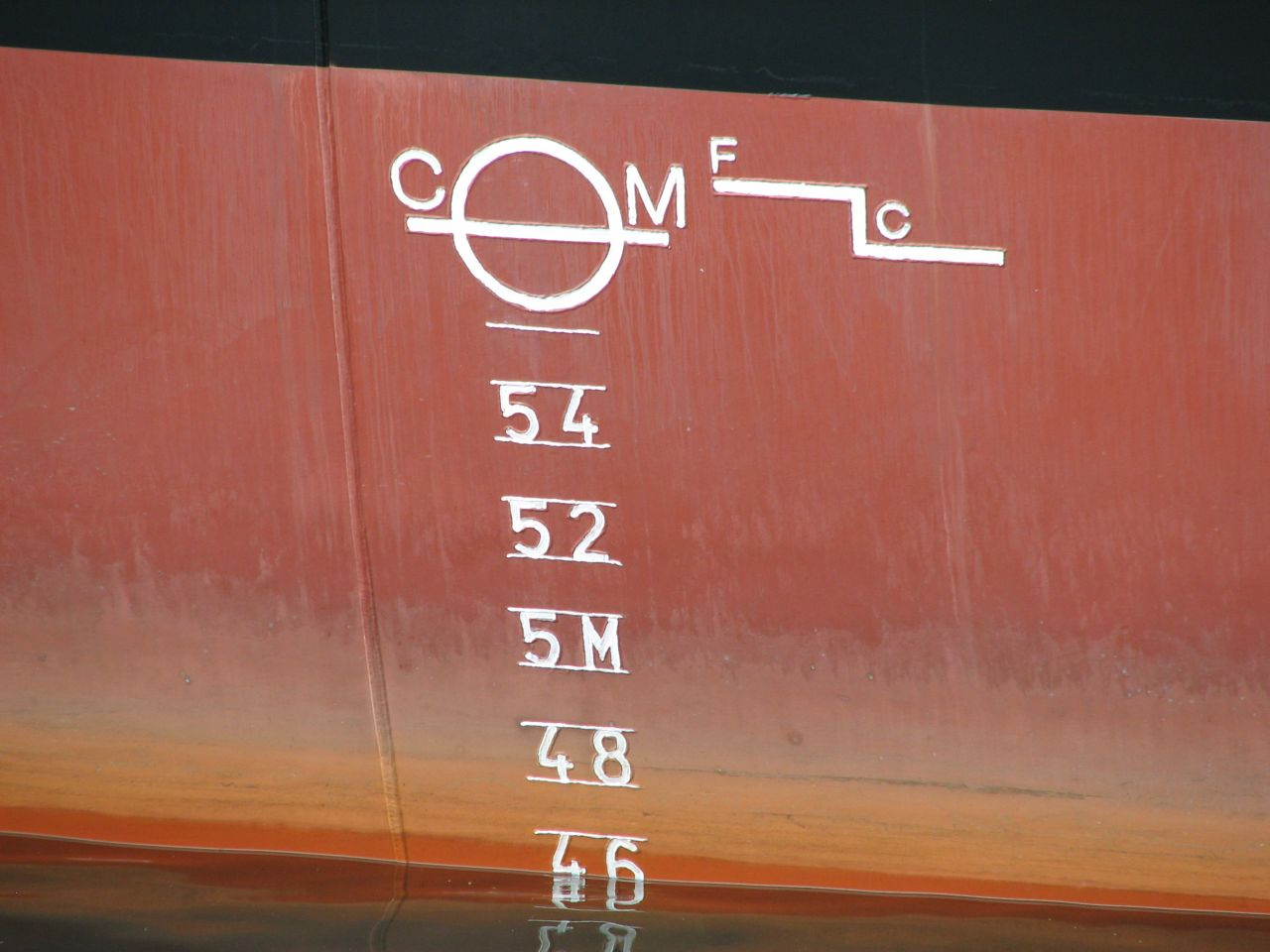
Load line mark and draft marks on the side of a ship

These are markings and numbers located on both sides of a vessel, as close as possible to the bow and stern, and then also, often amidships. The number and its associated marking indicate the distance from the marking to the bottom lowest fixed reference point of the vessel (e.g., its keel). The numbers and markings were large and clear; for instance, on U.S. naval vessels, the numbers were, historically, as a standard, 6 inches tall, with spacing of 12 inches bottom to bottom, vertically.

These hull markings constitute a "banded" scale, and may be accompanied by international load line markings. The scale may use Imperial units or metric units; the Imperial system is as stated above (markings 6 inches high, spaced at 12 inch intervals, where the bottom of each marking is the draft in feet); in metric marking, the bottom of each draft mark is the draft in decimeters and each mark is one decimeter high, spaced at intervals of 2 decimeters.

An internal draft gauge or draft indicator is used on larger ships. It consists of a pressure gauge attached to a seacock below the light-load line and calibrated to reflect the draft of the ship.

== Implications ==
=== Large ships ===
Larger ships need to keep the propeller immersed when they are light (without cargo), and may ballast further to reduce windage or for better directional stability or seakeeping, or to distribute load along the hull to reduce hogging and sagging stresses. To achieve this they use sailing ballast distributed among ballast tanks to stabilize the ship, following the unloading of cargo. The draft of a large ship has little direct link with its stability because stability depends mainly on the relative positions of the metacenter of the hull and the center of gravity. However, a "light" ship may have an excessively high stability which can cause uncomfortable rolling of the ship. A fully laden ship (with a large draft) can have either a high or low stability, depending on the height of the center of gravity, which is affected by the distribution of cargo.

The draft of a ship can be increased by longitudinal motion in shallow water, a hydrodynamic effect known as squat, which causes a local pressure reduction under the vessel. This in effect causes a ship to 'vertically sink 'down' leading to a reduction in under keel clearance.

Large ships experience a draft increase to heel effect where the ship's beam angles on one side during an alteration of course (sometimes known as turning effect).

=== Waterways ===
Draft is a significant factor limiting navigable waterways, especially for large vessels. This includes many shallow coastal waters and reefs, but also some major shipping lanes, therefore restriction on the maximum draft (the draft limit, a distance from the seabed or riverbed to the water level) is sometimes established (in particular, all ports set up draft limits). Panamax class ships—the largest ships able to transit the Panama Canal—do have a draft limit (and an "air draft" limit for passing under bridges) but are usually limited by beam, or sometimes length overall, for fitting into locks. However, ships can be longer, wider and higher in the Suez Canal, the limiting factor for Suezmax ships is draft. Some supertankers are able to transit the Suez Canal when unladen or partially laden, but not when fully laden.

Canals are not the only draft-limited shipping lanes. A Malaccamax ship, is the deepest draft able to transit the very busy but relatively shallow Strait of Malacca. The Strait only allows ships to have 0.4 m (1.31 ft) more draft than the Suez Canal. Capesize, Ultra Large Crude Carriers and a few Chinamax carriers, are some of the ships that have too deep a draft when laden, for either the Strait of Malacca or the Suez Canal.

=== Pleasure boats ===
A small draft allows pleasure boats to navigate through shallower water. This makes it possible for these boats to access smaller ports, to travel along rivers and even to 'beach' the boat. A large draft may increase ultimate stability in, depending on the hull form, as the center of gravity can be lower. A broad beamed boat like a catamaran can provide high initial stability with a small draft, but the width of the boat increases.

=== Submarines ===
A term called keel depth is used for submarines, which can submerge to different depths at sea, specifying the current distance from the water surface to the bottom of the submarine's keel. It is used in navigation to avoid underwater obstacles and hitting the ocean floor, and as a standard point on the submarine for depth measurements. Submarines usually also have a specified draft used while operating on the surface, for navigating in harbors and at docks.

== See also ==
- Air draft
- Hull (watercraft)
- Naval architecture
- Waterline
