= Keel depth =

Distance from water surface to the keel of a ship

Keel depth (sometimes given as Depth to keel) is the depth (or draft) of water from the water surface to the keel of a vessel, the deepest part. The keel establishes a commonly defined reference point to measure to.

Keel depth is useful for determining safe operating depth in shallow water.
