= Redoutable-class submarine =

Redoutable-class submarine may refer to one of the following classes of submarine for the French Navy:

- Redoutable-class submarine (1928)
- Redoutable-class submarine (1967)
