= Gremikha Bay =

- Губа Гремиха (Russian)
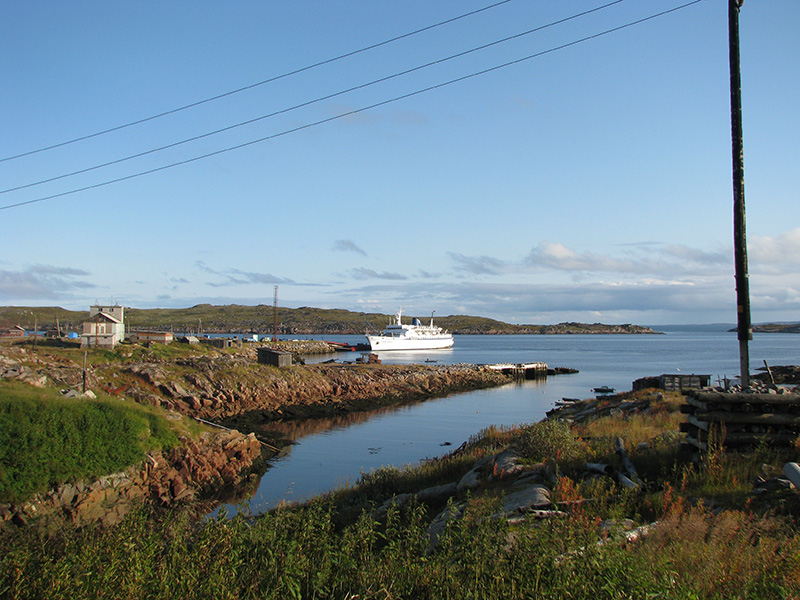
- The Russian Maria Yermolova-class passenger ship Claudia Elanskaya near Gremikha

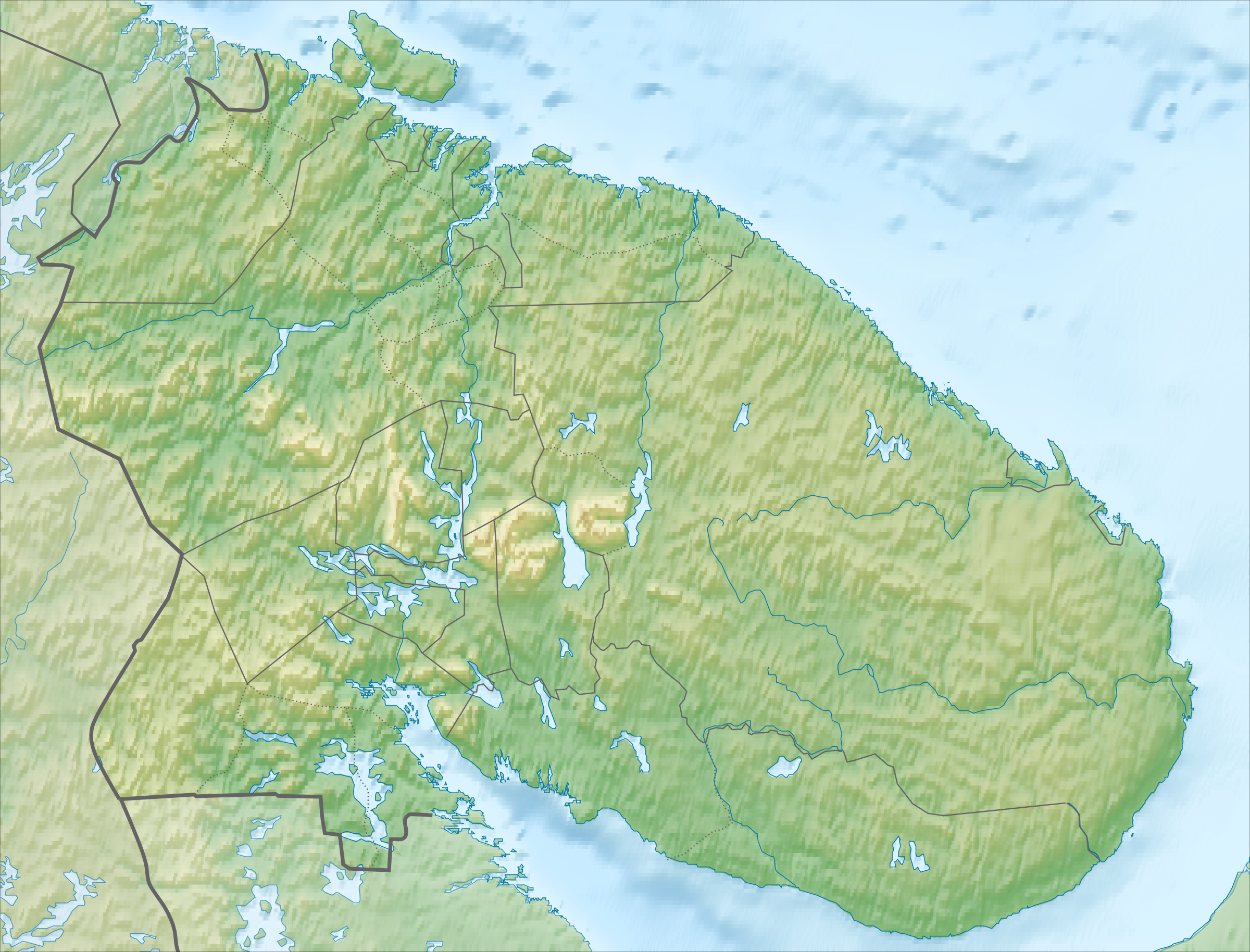
- Location within Murmansk Oblast
- Location: Northeastern Kola Peninsula
- Coordinates: 68°04′N 39°33′E
- Type: Bay
- Primary inflows: Barents Sea
- Settlements: Ostrovnoy, Murmansk Oblast, Russia

Gremikha Bay (Russian: Губа Гремиха) is a bay on the northeastern portion of the Kola Peninsula in the far northwest of Russia, near the closed town of Ostrovnoy (which was formerly known as Gremikha), in the Murmansk Oblast.
