= Russian Shipyard Number 10 =

Naval shipyard in Polyarny, Murmansk Oblast, Russia

Coordinates: 69.199515°N 33.420019°E

10 Order of the Red Banner of Labor shipyard
- Company type: Joint-stock company
- Industry: Shipbuilding
- Founded: 1935
- Headquarters: Polyarny, Russia
- Revenue: $9.52 million (2017)
- Operating income: −$3.46 million (2017)
- Net income: −$3.57 million (2017)
- Total assets: $18.5 million (2017)
- Total equity: $1.15 million (2017)
- Parent: United Shipbuilding Corporation
- Website: ao10srz.ru

Russian Shipyard No. 10—Shkval (Russian: Акционерного общества «10 ордена Трудового Красного Знамени судоремонтный завод») is located in Polyarny, Murmansk Oblast, Russia, on the outermost western side of the Murmansk Fjord. In the West, it is more often referred to by the name of the town than its official name. As the first nuclear-powered submarines were delivered to the Northern Fleet at the end of the 1950s, the yard was modified for docking and repair of these vessels. As Soviet Navy (and now Russian Navy) nuclear vessels are decommissioned, they are laid up at Polyarny awaiting defueling and disposal.

Around 1970, Shkval was reorganised and partially expanded in order to handle the larger nuclear submarines then coming into service. It now includes tenders, service ships, dry docks, and two covered floating docks, as well as a self-propelled barge with 150-tonne payload, two onshore cranes with lifting capacity of 40 tonnes and 32 tonnes, and two floating cranes with lifting capacity of 30 tonnes and 25 tonnes. The yard employs about 3,000 workers, and covers 41,330 square metres (444,900 sq ft). Its docks total 550 metres (1,800 ft) in length.

== In popular culture ==
In the Tom Clancy novel, The Hunt for Red October, the experimental Typhoon-class nuclear submarine Red October departs on its fateful voyage from this shipyard.

In the 2018 action thriller film, Hunter Killer, the president of Russia is seen landing in the shipyard, greeted by a military parade on the docks.
