= SSN (hull classification symbol) =

US Navy symbol for nuclear-powered attack submarines

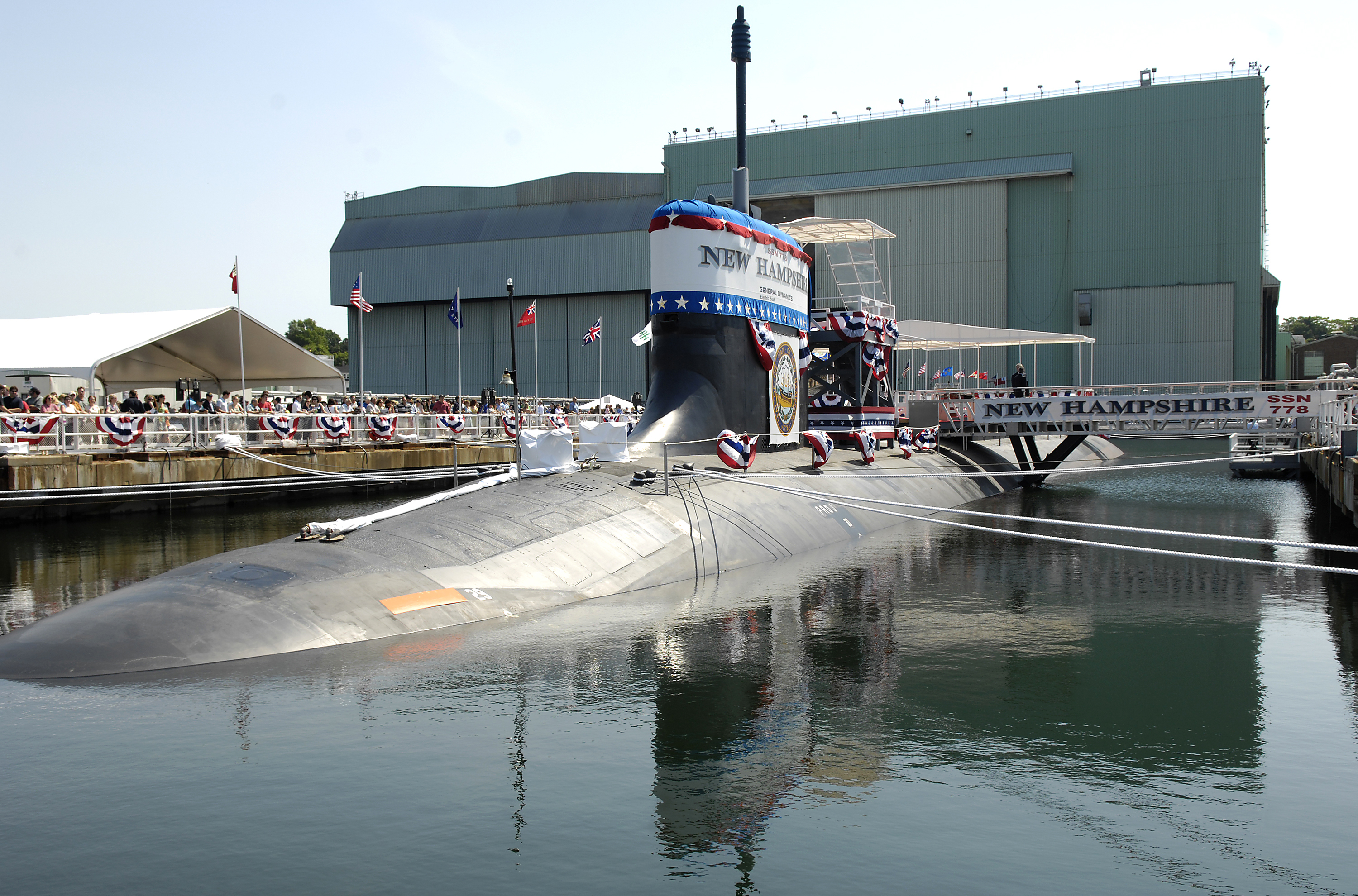
USS New Hampshire (SSN-778), a Virginia-class submarine

SSN is the US Navy hull classification symbol for nuclear-powered general-purpose attack submarines. SS means "Submarine, General" according to the NATO Standard Ship Designator System (STANAG 1166,) with SSN referring to a "Submarine, Attack, Nuclear" vessel. The "SS" designator is consistent with other examples of STANAG 1166 using double letter referring to a type of vessel – for example, "BB" designates a Battleships, "DD" is a Destroyer, "CC" a Cruiser, "FF" a Frigate, and so on.

== History ==
The first nuclear-powered attack submarine was the US Navy's USS Nautilus, operational from 1954. This was followed by the four submarines of the Skate class entering service in 1957. The Royal Navy's first nuclear fleet submarine was HMS Dreadnought which by using an American reactor entered service in 1963. The first all-British nuclear submarines were the two Valiant-class submarines. The SS designation has sometimes been incorrectly quoted as being an abbreviation of 'Ship Submersible' but this is not correct – even the Royal Navy have made this mistake in the past on the some of their historical (but now withdrawn) websites.

The USN submarine fleet has been all-nuclear powered for over three decades. The last Barbel-class diesel-electric attack submarine, USS Blueback (SS-581), was decommissioned in 1990. The bulk of the USN's SSN fleet has been the Los Angeles-class attack submarine. Designed during the Cold War the Los Angeles-class boats' raison d'etre was to protect USN carrier battle groups and to hunt Soviet Navy SSBNs before they could launch a first strike against the United States.

The first ever major combat action involving an SSN was during the 1982 Falklands War. An Argentinian cruiser, ARA General Belgrano was sunk by torpedoes fired by the Royal Navy fleet submarine HMS Conqueror. After that incident, the Argentinian Navy was effectively confined to port.

Since the end of the Cold War, SSNs have evolved into multi-mission submarines. Their roles include submarine-launched cruise missile platforms, intelligence gathering platforms, insertion and exfiltration of special forces teams in addition to traditional hunter-killer SSN roles.

The advantages of an SSN over a conventionally powered SSK are much longer endurance (limited more by the crew than the boat, a nuclear submarine can stay submerged for months and does not need refueling in their 25-year lifespans), and higher speed. Unlike most SSKs, SSNs do not have to surface periodically for air, which would compromise their stealth. Some of the newest conventional submarines approach these advantages: Stirling engine powered vessels can cruise underwater for up to two weeks and, like diesel/electric vessels (and in theory LOX powered vessels), are significantly quieter than nuclear submarines, since they do not need to run the powerful (and noisy) pumps associated with the cooling circuits of pressurized water reactors.

The main disadvantages of an SSN are the technological challenges and expenses of building and maintaining a nuclear power plant. Nuclear submarines can have political downsides, as some countries refuse to accept nuclear-powered vessels as a matter of policy. Furthermore, decommissioned nuclear submarines require costly dismantling and long-term storage of the radioactive waste.

The following navies currently operate SSNs:

- United States Navy
- Russian Navy
- French Navy
- Indian Navy
- People's Liberation Army Navy of China
- Royal Navy of the United Kingdom

== Active and future SSN classes ==
(Australia) Royal Australian Navy

- Virginia-class submarine – 3 planned (with an option to purchase a further two vessels)
- SSN-AUKUS – up to eight planned

(Brazil) Brazilian Navy

- Brazilian submarine Álvaro Alberto – one under construction

People's Liberation Army Navy of the People's Republic of China

- Type 091 submarine – 3 in service, 2 retired
- Type 093 submarine – 6 in service
- Type 095 submarine – 5 planned

(France) French Navy

- Rubis-class submarine – 2 in service, 4 retired
- Suffren-class submarine – 3 in service, total of 6 planned

(India) Indian Navy

- Akula-class submarine – one to be delivered by 2028. (Another leased Akula class submarine was returned to Russia in 2021, before the end of its contract. )
- Project 77-class submarine – 2 cleared, 6 planned

(Russia) Russian Navy

- Victor III-class submarine – 2 in service, 46 retired
- Sierra II-class submarine – 2 in service
- Akula-class submarine – 10 in service, four retired
- Yasen-class submarine – 6 in service, one on sea trials, total of 12 planned

Royal Navy of the United Kingdom

(Known as "fleet submarines" in the Royal Navy.)

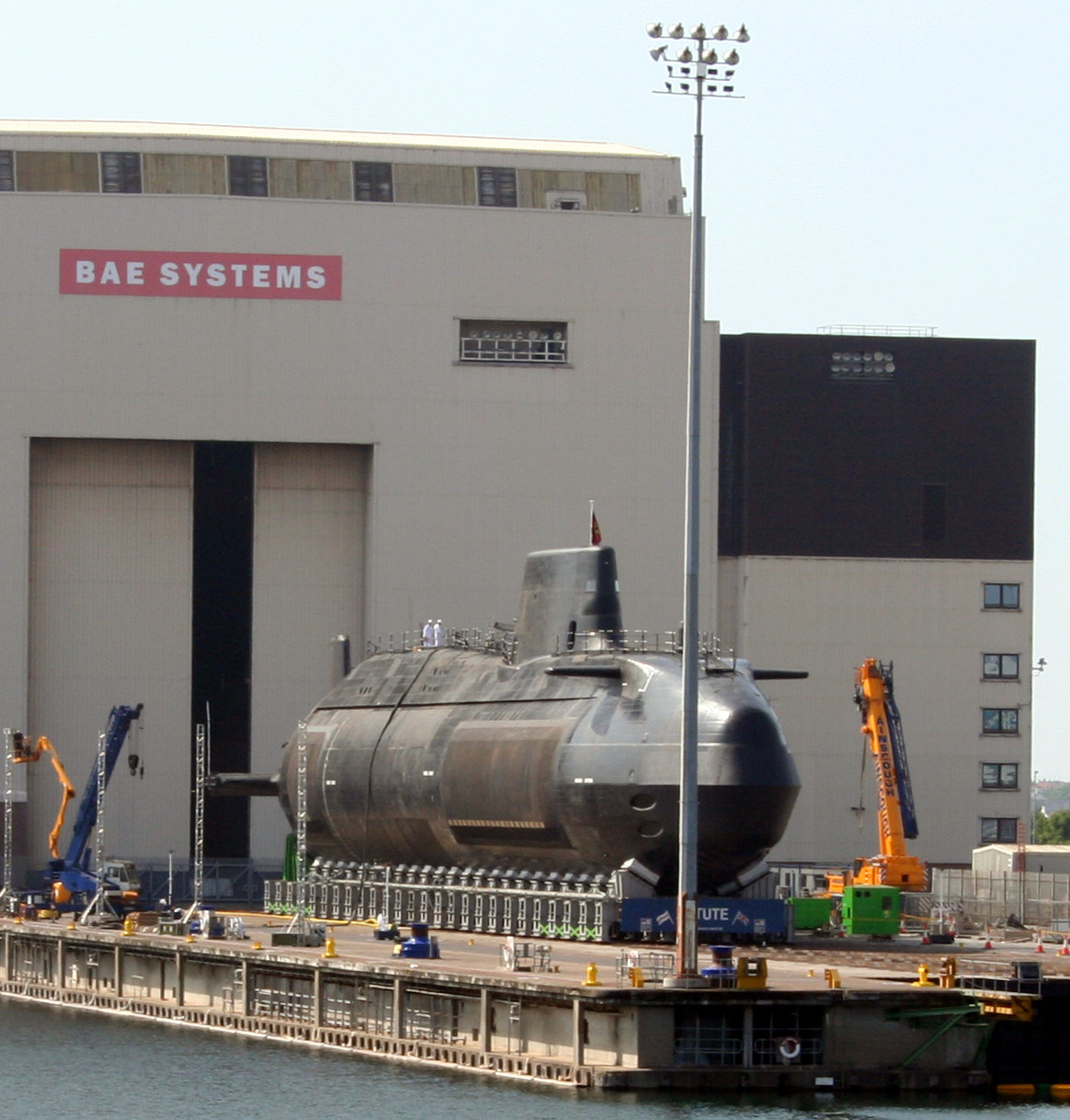
HMS Astute, an Astute-class submarine.

- Trafalgar-class submarine – 1 in service, six retired
- Astute-class submarine – 5 in service, two more under construction
- SSN-AUKUS – 12 Planned (long lead items ordered)

United States Navy

- Los Angeles-class submarine – 30 in service, 32 retired
- Seawolf-class submarine – 3 in service
- Virginia-class submarine – 19 in service, 66 planned in total
- SSN(X)-class submarine – number TBD (under development)

== Retired SSN classes ==
(India) Indian Navy

- INS Chakra (1987) was formerly the Charlie-class submarine K-43 leased in 1987 from Russia and returned in 1991.
- INS Chakra (2011) was formerly the Akula-class submarine Nerpa leased from Russia in 2011 and returned in June 2021.

Royal Navy of the United Kingdom

- HMS Dreadnought - the Royal Navy's first nuclear-powered fleet submarine 1963 - 1980
- Valiant-class submarine — 2 submarines in service 1966–94
- Churchill-class submarine — 3 submarines in service 1970–92
- Swiftsure-class submarine — 6 submarines 1973–2010

(Soviet Union) Soviet / (Russia) Russian Navy

- November-class submarine 1958–91
- K-278 Komsomolets — only member of the "Mike" class, 1984–89 (sank after fire)
- Alfa-class submarine

United States Navy

- USS Nautilus (SSN-571) (unique)
- USS Seawolf (SSN-575) (unique)
- Skate-class submarine — 4 submarines in service 1957–89
- Skipjack-class submarine — 6 submarines in service 1959–90 (one lost, 1968)
- USS Triton (SSN-586) (unique)
- USS Halibut (SSN-587) (unique)
- Permit-class submarine — 14 submarines in service 1961–96 (one lost, 1963)
- USS Tullibee (SSN-597) (unique)
- Sturgeon-class submarine — 37 submarines in service 1967–2004
- USS Narwhal (SSN-671) (unique)
- USS Glenard P. Lipscomb (SSN-685) (unique)

== See also ==
- Nuclear submarine
- Ballistic missile submarine (SSB/SSBN)
- Cruise missile submarine (SSG/SSGN)
- List of submarine classes
- List of submarine classes of the Royal Navy
- List of Soviet and Russian submarine classes
- List of submarine classes of the United States Navy
