= Soviet submarine K-320 =

Guided-missile submarine

- Charlie I class

History

Soviet Union, Russia
- Builder: Gorky
- Laid down: 30 April 1968
- Launched: 27 March 1971
- Commissioned: 15 September 1971
- Decommissioned: 19 April 1990
- Stricken: 1994
- Fate: Sold for scrap, 1994

General characteristics
- Class & type: Charlie-class cruise missile submarine
- Displacement: Surfaced: 4000 tons; Submerged: 5000 tons
- Length: 95 m (312 ft)
- Beam: 10 m (33 ft)
- Draught: 8 m (26 ft)
- Installed power: 1 pressurized water-cooled nuclear reactor; 18,800 kW (25,200 shp)
- Propulsion: 1 shaft; 1 steam turbine
- Speed: Surfaced: 12 knots (22 km/h; 14 mph); Submerged: 26 knots (48 km/h; 30 mph)
- Range: Unlimited except by food supplies
- Test depth: 240 m (790 ft)
- Complement: 86
- Armament: 8 × SS-N-7 Starbright anti-ship cruise missiles; 4 × bow 533 mm (21 in) torpedo tubes; 2 × bow 406 mm (16 in) torpedo tubes

The nuclear-powered Charlie-I Soviet submarine K-320 had a reactor accident on 18 January 1970, while under construction in Gorky. The submarine was repaired, commissioned on 15 September 1971 and was stricken in 1994.

== Description ==
The Charlie I-class submarine was a partially double-hulled design that displaced 4,000 metric tons (3,900 long tons) on the surface and 4,900 t (4,800 long tons) submerged. The boats had an overall length of 95 meters (311 ft 8 in), a beam of 10 meters (32 ft 10 in) and a draught of 8 meters (26 ft 3 in). They had a test depth of 240 meters (790 ft) and a design depth of 300 meters (980 ft). The crew numbered 86 officers and enlisted men.

The submarines were powered by a single 82.9-megawatt (111,200 hp) VM-4 reactor that supplied steam for the OK-350 steam turbine driving the propeller shaft. The turbine produced 18,800 shaft horsepower (14,000 kW) that was intended to propel them at a speed of 26 knots (48 km/h; 30 mph). The Charlie Is were equipped with two 2,000-kilowatt (2,700 shp) turbogenerators and a 500-kilowatt (670 hp) diesel generator. The boats made 12 knots (22 km/h; 14 mph) on the surface and reached 26 knots (48 km/h; 30 mph) underwater.

=== Armament, sensors and fire control ===
The submarines' primary armament consisted of eight P-70 Ametist (NATO reporting name: SS-N-7 Starbright) anti-ship missiles in individual tubes between the inner and outer hulls. The tubes were angled upwards at an angle of 32.5 degrees. As the missile used four solid-propellant boosters, it could be launched underwater at a maximum depth of 30 m (98 ft). No more than five missiles could be fired in one volley and the second volley could be fired three minutes later. The Charlie Is were equipped with four 533 mm (21 in) and two 406 mm (16 in) torpedo tubes in the bow to allow the submarine to act as a normal attack submarine after her missiles were expended. The boats stowed eight reloads for the 533 mm tubes and four for the 406 mm ones.

The small size of the Charlie Is forced a smaller and less effective MGK-100 Kerch (NATO reporting name: Shark Teeth) sonar system occupied the nose of the lower inner hull. It was fitted with both active and passive transducers and was intended to detect carrier battle groups at medium ranges. It would transmit the data to the missiles for its initial targeting. Once fired, the submarine did not have to provide any further targeting data as the missile was equipped with a radar of its own. The submarines were fitted with a Snoop Tray (NATO reporting name) search radar.

== The 1970 radiological incident ==
To be finished for Vladimir Lenin's 100th anniversary, construction of K-320 was rushed. During a hydraulic test of the primary coolant circuit, the reactor became prompt critical and generated full effect for 10–15 seconds. The finding was that plugs on the primary test failed, so a powerful fountain of water and steam poured all around the assembly shop. Twelve dockworkers near the reactor were killed immediately by the steam generated by the uncontrolled reaction and 150-200 others were directly contaminated. Most of the contamination was contained in the workshop but a cloud of radioactive gas and particulates contaminated up to 2000 people in the area around the shipyard.

== Bibliography ==
- Friedman, Norman (1995). "Soviet Union 1947–1991: Russian Federation and Successor States 1991–". In Chumbley, Stephen (ed.). Conway's All the World's Fighting Ships, 1947–1995. Annapolis, Maryland: Naval Institute Press. pp. 337–426. ISBN 1-55750-132-7.
- Hampshire, Edward (2018). Soviet Cruise Missile Submarines of the Cold War. London: Osprey Publishing. ISBN 978-1-47282-499-8.
- Pavlov, A. S. (1997). Warships of the USSR and Russia 1945–1995. Annapolis, Maryland: Naval Institute Press. ISBN 1-55750-671-X.
- Polmar, Norman & Noot, Jurrien (1991). Submarines of the Russian and Soviet Navies, 1718–1990. Annapolis, Maryland: Naval Institute Press. ISBN 0-87021-570-1.
- Vilches Alarcón, Alejandro A. (2022). From Juliettes to Yasens: Development and Operational History of Soviet Cruise-Missile Submarines. Europe @ War (22). Warwick, UK: Helion & Co. ISBN 978-1-915070-68-5.
