= Soviet submarine K-429 =

Submarine of the Pacific Fleet

- Charlie I class

History

Soviet Union
- Name: K-429
- Laid down: 26 January 1971
- Launched: 22 April 1972
- Commissioned: 31 October 1972
- Decommissioned: 1987
- Home port: Petropavlovsk-Kamchatsky

General characteristics
- Class & type: Charlie-class submarine
- Displacement: 4,300 long tons (4,369 t) surfaced; 5,500 long tons (5,588 t) submerged
- Length: 104 m (341 ft 2 in)
- Beam: 9.9 m (32 ft 6 in)
- Draft: 7.8 m (25 ft 7 in)
- Propulsion: OK-350 with a VM-4 reactor core generating 89.2 MWt (18,000 hp)
- Speed: 26 knots (48 km/h; 30 mph)
- Test depth: 300 m (980 ft)
- Complement: 100 officers and men
- Armament: 6 × 21 in (530 mm) torpedo tubes; 8 × SS-N-7 Starbright missiles

K-429 (often incorrectly referred to as K-329) was a Project 670-A Скат (Skat, meaning "ray"; also known by its NATO reporting name of Charlie I-class) nuclear submarine of the Soviet Navy. Her keel was laid down on 26 January 1971 at Krasnoye Sormovo in Gorky. She was launched on 22 April 1972, and was commissioned on 31 October 1972 into the Soviet Pacific Fleet.

== Sinking incidents ==
In early 1983, K-429 returned to base needing overhaul after a long patrol. After turning their boat over to the shipyard, crew departed on leave. Her nuclear weapons remained aboard.

=== Ordered to sea ===
That June, Captain First Rank Nikolay Suvorov was ordered by Rear Admiral Oleg Yerofeyev to reassume command of K-429 and to take part in an exercise. Suvorov questioned the order: the exercises had been planned for later in the year, the boat was being repaired, the crew was on leave, and Suvorov expected a transfer to Saint Petersburg. Yerofeyev explained that Suvorov's Communist Party membership would be revoked and he would have to face a tribunal if he asked such questions. Without Communist Party membership, Suvorov would not be allowed to command a warship.

Suvorov recalled his crew and returned to K-429. Much of the crew could not be contacted, and their places were filled by sailors from the naval base and from five other boats that were in port at the time. Nearly one-third of the 120 crewmen had never been on K-429 before, and none of them received any training on K-429. On 23 June 1983, K-429 was ordered to proceed immediately to the torpedo firing range. Suvorov refused that order, replying that standard operating procedures required him to perform a test dive first.

=== The sinking ===
In the late evening on 23 June, K-429 arrived at her testing area in Sarannaya Bay, just south of Petropavlovsk-Kamchatsky, and Suvorov gave the order to dive to periscope depth. However, he had not given the preliminary command to set the diving watch – the crew neither aligned the boat's systems for sea, nor were they at their stations to control the boat during the dive.

Because the boat had not been prepared to dive, instrumentation valves were not aligned properly, and even though the main ballast tanks were filling, their indicators read empty. Confused, Suvorov ordered auxiliary ballast tanks filled. Over-ballasted to about 60 tons negative buoyancy, the boat dived very quickly.

While K-429 was in the shipyard, her ventilation system had been opened to the maximum extent possible, so as to exhaust fumes from welding. Various interlocks that would automatically shut ventilation valves were disabled. This lineup was not corrected before the boat dived.

The open ventilation system caused immediate catastrophic flooding of the forward compartments. Suvorov ordered an emergency ballast blow, but the operator became confused and shut the flood valves on the bottoms of the tanks, while opening the vents on the tops of the tanks. About half of the boat's supply of high-pressure air was wasted through the vents without displacing any water. The forward compartments took on about 420 cubic meters (420 tons) of water before the ventilation system could be secured, killing 14 men immediately. At about midnight, the boat hit bottom, about 39 meters down. Although Suvorov had made mistakes that contributed to the sinking, his insistence on a test dive had saved the remaining men: the torpedo firing range was around 200 meters deep. If Suvorov had proceeded there directly, K-429 may have been lost.

=== The rescue ===
The boat's emergency buoys and escape capsules had been welded to the hull to prevent losing them at sea, so escape would require the crew to make a free ascent in Arctic waters. Suvorov assumed that his report that he would make a test dive had been received, and that the duty officer would give the alarm in about an hour when he failed to report re-surfacing. He ordered his crew to remain at their stations and await rescue, even though the boat's battery had begun releasing hydrogen.

Several hours later, during the morning of 25 June, Suvorov called for volunteers. Two of his original crew donned escape gear, locked out of the torpedo room escape trunk, and successfully ascended to the surface. They saw no ships in the area, so they swam to shore, where they were arrested by military police.

Their report reached Admiral Yerofeyev at about noon. By 19:15 that evening, the boat had been located, and the first sailor ascended to the waiting rescue ships at 22:36. During the rescue, two more seamen were lost during their ascent. The last seaman reached the surface at 23:00.

=== Aftermath ===
On 6 August K-429 was raised and towed into shallow water, and salvage began. It transpired that the reactor had shut down automatically, but that its control rods had jammed before reaching their full stroke, and the reactor had been operating at about 0.5% power since the disaster. No radiation or contamination leakage was found. On 8 August, K-429 was raised into dry dock.

Suvorov was sentenced to ten years in prison. Likhovozov, chief of the fifth compartment, was sentenced for eight years. They were arrested in the barracks where the court took place, without letting them say good-bye to their wives. Suvorov told an interviewer, "I am not fully innocent, but a fair analysis should have been made to avoid such accidents in the future. I told the judges in my concluding statement: If you do not tell the truth, others do not learn from bad experiences — more accidents will happen, more people will die."

Admiral Yerofeyev was promoted to Commander-in-Chief of the Northern Fleet.

On 13 September 1985, K-429 sank at her moorings. She was again raised and decommissioned.

== See also ==
- List of sunken nuclear submarines

== Bibliography ==
- Polmar, Norman & Noot, Jurrien (1991). Submarines of the Russian and Soviet Navies, 1718–1990. Annapolis, Maryland: Naval Institute Press. ISBN 0-87021-570-1.
- Vilches Alarcón, Alejandro A. (2022). From Juliettes to Yasens: Development and Operational History of Soviet Cruise-Missile Submarines. Europe @ War (22). Warwick, UK: Helion & Co. ISBN 978-1-915070-68-5.
