= Soviet submarine K-222 =

Nuclear-powered cruise-missile submarine

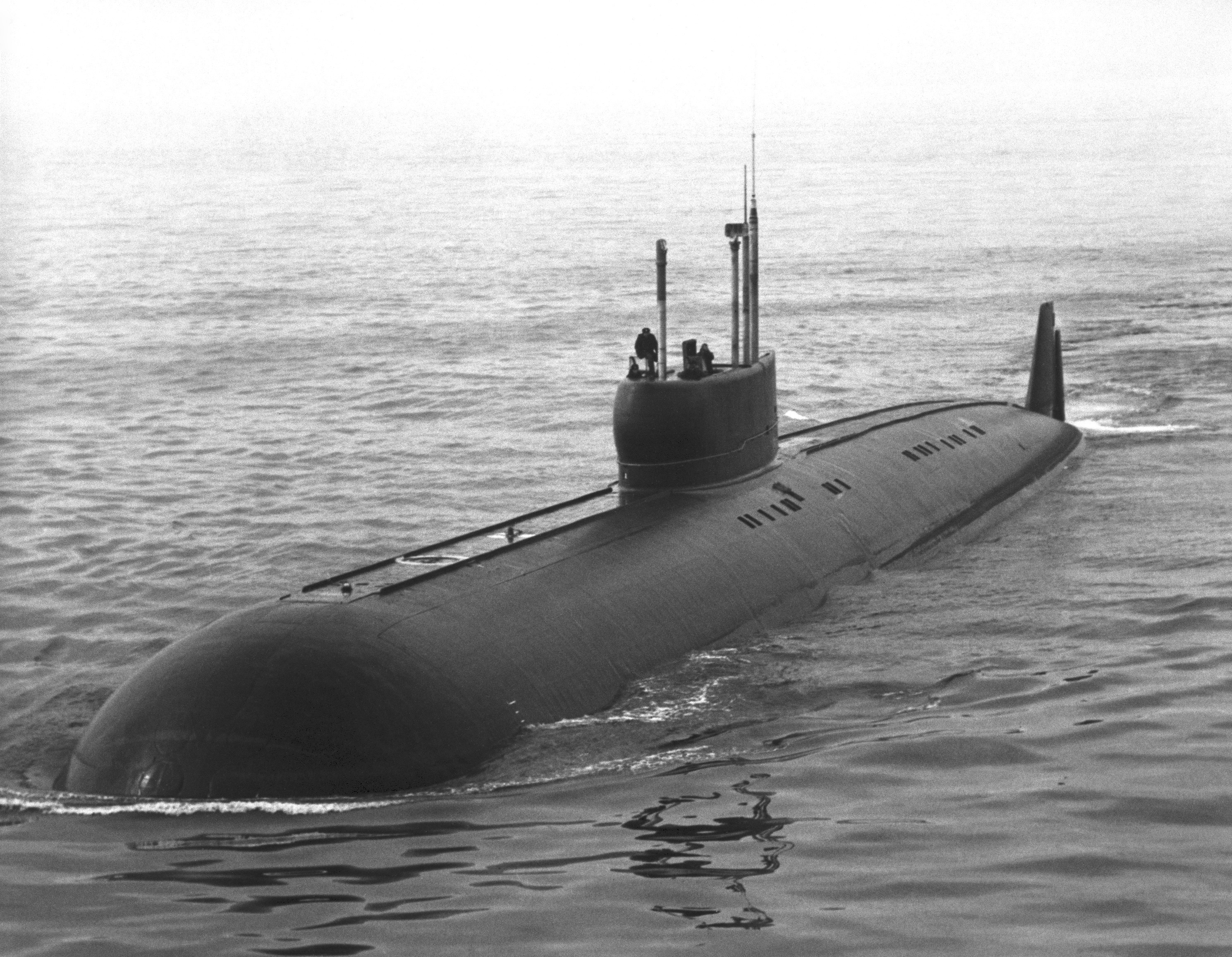
- K-222 on the surface

Class overview
- Operators: Soviet Navy
- Preceded by: Charlie class
- Succeeded by: Oscar class
- Built: 1963–1970
- In commission: 1970–1988

History

Soviet Union
- Name: K-168
- Builder: Sevmash, Severodvinsk
- Yard number: 501
- Laid down: 28 December 1963
- Launched: 21 December 1968
- Completed: 31 December 1969
- Commissioned: 1970
- Decommissioned: 1988
- Renamed: K-222 (15 January 1978)
- Fate: Scrapped, 2010

General characteristics
- Class & type: Papa-class cruise-missile submarine
- Displacement: 5,197 t (5,115 long tons) (surfaced); 7,000 t (6,900 long tons) (submerged)
- Length: 106.92 m (350 ft 9 in)
- Beam: 11.5 m (37 ft 9 in)
- Draft: 8.2 m (26 ft 11 in)
- Installed power: 2 × VM-5 nuclear reactors; 80,000 PS (59,000 kW))
- Propulsion: 2 × shafts; 2 × steam turbines
- Speed: 25 knots (46 km/h; 29 mph) (surfaced); 44 knots (81 km/h; 51 mph) (submerged)
- Endurance: 70 days
- Test depth: 400 m (1,300 ft)
- Complement: 82
- Sensors & processing systems: Rubin MGK-300 sonar; Albatros RLK-101 search radar
- Armament: 10 × SS-N-7 Starbright (P-70) cruise missiles; 4 × 533 mm (21 in) bow torpedo tubes

K-222 was the sole Project 661 "Anchar" (Cyrillic: Анчар) (NATO reporting name: Papa class) nuclear-powered cruise-missile submarine of the Soviet Navy during the Cold War. Although the Soviets saw K-222 as an unsuccessful design, upon completion it was the world's fastest submarine and the first to be built with a titanium hull. The submarine was given several names over the course of its construction and service: she was originally designated K-18, named K-162 while under construction, and renamed to K-222 in 1978.

The Soviet government and Navy was dissatisfied with the Echo class of nuclear submarines, which had to surface to fire their missiles. In 1958 construction was authorized for an exceedingly ambitious program; the requirements called for a very fast boat equipped with missiles that could be launched while submerged. It accepted the preliminary design two years later and construction began in 1963; work proceeded very slowly as techniques for working titanium had to be developed and quality control was inconsistent. The program's objectives were generally satisfied, but the government had failed to include a requirement to minimize the submarine's acoustic signature which meant that K-222 was easily detectable at high speed. The Soviet Navy rejected a plan to place the design into series production as its flaws outweighed its advantages, but it pioneered the technology needed to work with titanium on a large scale, which enabled the subsequent construction of more successful designs using titanium, such as Projects 705 Lira, 945 Barrakuda, and 945A Kondor.

Commissioned in 1969, the-then K-162 was armed with 10 short-range, anti-ship cruise missiles and four torpedo tubes to carry out her mission of destroying American aircraft carriers. These missiles could be fitted with either conventional or nuclear warheads. The submarine served in the Soviet Red Banner Northern Fleet through the 1970s, but the discovery of hull cracks led to a lengthy repair period from 1972 to 1975. After an accident with K-222's nuclear reactor in 1980, the submarine went on her final operational patrol in 1981. She was removed from service in 1988 and scrapped in 2010.

== Background ==
The Soviets were well aware of the drawbacks of the large SS-N-3 Shaddock family of missiles, notably its need to be launched from the surface and its complicated target-acquisition process, both of which rendered the submarines launching the missiles vulnerable to the carriers that they were intended to attack. The Council of Ministers issued a resolution on 28 August 1958 calling for a very ambitious submarine development program that called for a doubling of speed, a 50 percent increase in diving depth, smaller nuclear reactors and steam turbines, and a long-range missile system of small dimensions able to be fired while submerged, and new materials, among other objectives. Design bureau TsKB-16 began development of Project 661, an experimental cruise-missile submarine, later that year in response to the resolution. Chief designer N. N. Isanin decided to begin a clean-slate design that would use existing technology as little as possible. By July 1959 a sketch design was ready for a submarine capable of 38 knots (70 km/h; 44 mph) and the State Committee for Shipbuilding had to make decisions about what the submarine's hull would be constructed of and what type of nuclear reactor would be used.

Aluminium was quickly rejected as unsuitable because of its poor resistance to corrosion and poor performance under high pressure at high speeds. While new alloys of steel were still under development, titanium had some major advantages. It was much stronger than steel for a given weight, resisted corrosion better and was non-magnetic. This would help protect it against magnetic mines and registering on magnetic anomaly detectors of anti-submarine aircraft. Disregarding the extremely high cost of titanium compared to steel and that titanium could not be welded in an oxygen atmosphere, the committee selected it. Two types of reactor were potentially available at this time, pressurized water or lead-bismuth eutectic. The Soviets had some experience with the former, but none with the latter; this proved to be the deciding factor as the committee was unwilling to wait for the lead-bismuth reactor to be developed even though it promised to be smaller for the same amount of power output. K-222 would be the first submarine built with a titanium hull.

These decisions produced a design that had an underwater speed of 38 knots and was capable of carrying 10–12 missile launchers forward of the sail, but was larger than the specified displacement if fitted with two propeller shafts. The committee considered using a single shaft, but ultimately rejected it, preferring the redundancy of two reactors. It did delete the auxiliary diesel generator that earlier nuclear-powered submarines had been equipped with to compensate for using two shafts when it accepted the sketch design and authorized preliminary design work in February 1960. The final design was approved three months later. To reduce the technical risk of many of the advanced components chosen, the navy modified five existing submarines to test various systems such as the P-70 Ametist (NATO reporting name: SS-N-7 Starbright), GRAU designation: 4K66; Russian: П-70 «Аметист» 'Amethyst') missiles, sonars and other electronics.

== Description ==
K-222 was a double-hulled design that displaced 5,197 metric tons (5,115 long tons) on the surface and 7,000 t (6,900 long tons) submerged. The boat had an overall length of 106.92 meters (350 ft 9 in), a beam of 11.5 meters (37 ft 9 in) and a draft of 8.2 meters (26 ft 11 in). The submarine's inner hull had nine watertight compartments and had an unusual configuration at the bow where the first two compartments were narrower than the rest of the hull and were superimposed in a figure 8 shape; the upper compartment housed the torpedo tubes while the lower contained the massive sonar system and some of the batteries. The third compartment was as narrow as the first two (5.9 m (19 ft 4 in)) while the rest of the compartments widened to a diameter of 9 m (29 ft 6 in). K-222 had a test depth of 400 meters (1,300 ft) and a design depth of 550 meters (1,800 ft). The crew numbered 82 officers and enlisted men.

The submarine was powered by a pair of 177.4-megawatt (237,900 hp) VM-5M reactors, each supplying steam for the GTZA-618 steam turbine driving each propeller shaft. The turbines produced a total of 80,000 shaft horsepower (60,000 kW) that was intended to propel K-222 at a speed of 38 knots. The boat was equipped with two 3,000-kilowatt (4,000 shp) turbogenerators; two banks of 152-cell silver-zinc batteries were fitted in lieu of a diesel generator. The boat made 25 knots (46 km/h; 29 mph) on the surface, and proved to be much faster than planned underwater and reached a top speed of 42 knots (78 km/h; 48 mph) at 90 percent power during her sea trials in December 1969. During this 12-hour full-speed test, some of the external hull fittings were ripped off and portions of the grills protecting the water intakes broke loose and were ground up by the water-circulation pumps. One account of the trial wrote:

the biggest thing was the noise of the water going by. It increased together with the ship's speed, and when 35 knots (65 km/h; 40 mph) was exceeded, it was like the noise of a jet aircraft. ... In the control room was not heard simply the roar of an aircraft, but the thunder of "the engine room of a diesel locomotive". Those present believed that the noise level was greater than 100 decibels.

On a subsequent trial in 1970 at full power, K-222 reached 44.7 knots (82.8 km/h; 51.4 mph), the fastest speed attained underwater by a manned object (Note: A third attempt was made in 1971 that recorded a speed of 44.85 kn (83.06 km/h; 51.61 mph), but the Soviet Navy rejected the figure because the reactors were not at 100 percent during the test.) and making K-222 the world's fastest submarine. The submarine carried enough supplies to stay at sea for 70 days.

=== Armament, sensors and fire control ===
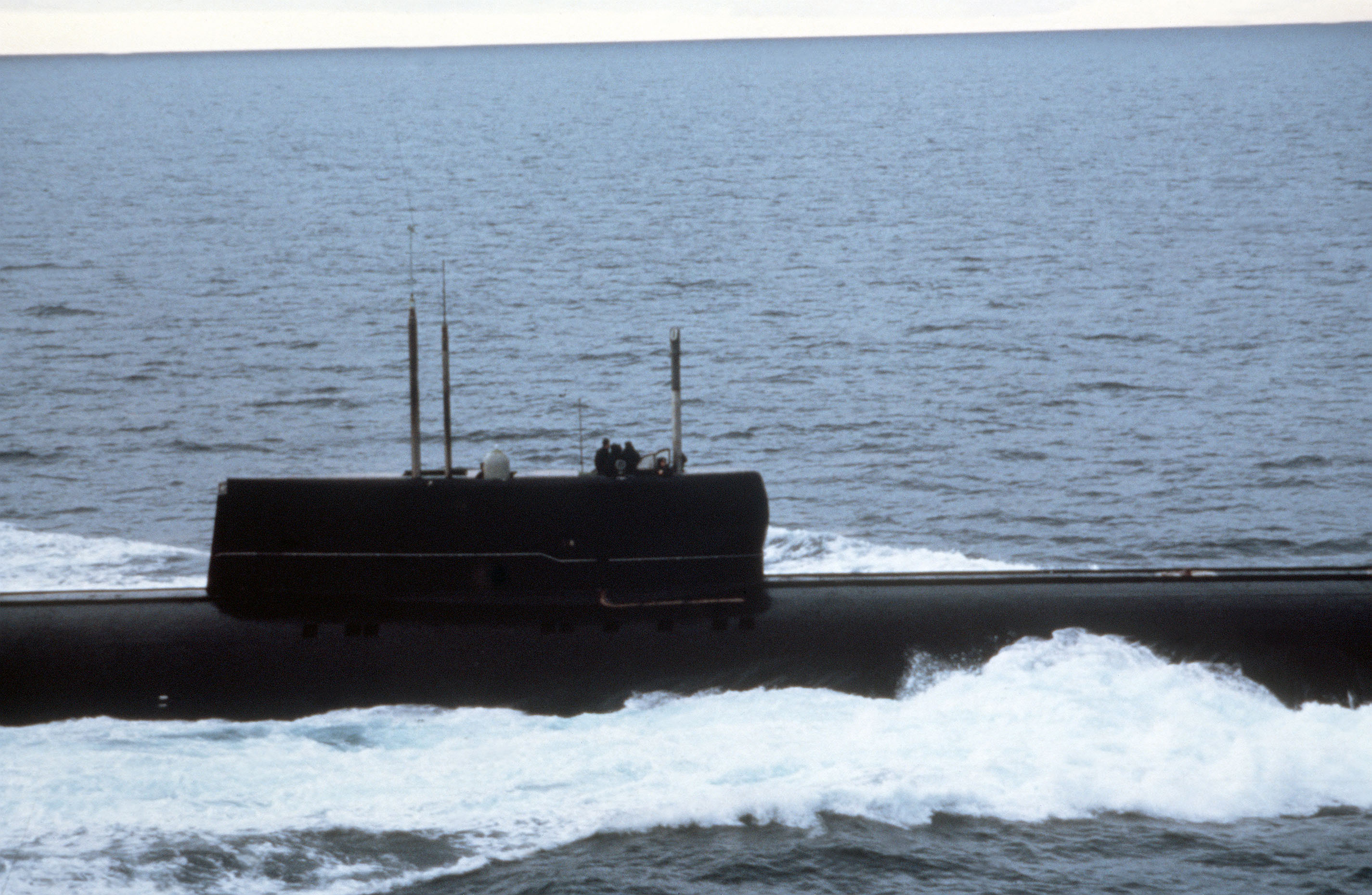
A close-up of K-222's sail, 26 October 1983

The submarine's primary armament consisted of 10 P-70 missiles in individual tubes between the inner and outer hulls forward of the sail. The tubes were positioned upwards at an angle of 32.5 degrees. As the missile used four solid-propellant boosters, it could be launched underwater at a maximum depth of 30 m (98 ft). No more than five missiles could be fired in one volley and the second volley could be fired three minutes later. The narrowness of the bow compartment prevented K-222 from being fitted with more than four 533 mm (21 in) torpedo tubes, although she stowed eight reloads for them. The torpedoes could be fired down to a depth of 200 m (660 ft).

The massive cylindrical Rubin MGK-300 sonar system occupied the nose of the lower inner hull and measured 6 m (19 ft 8 in) in diameter and 3 m (9 ft 10 in) in height. It was fitted with both active and passive transducers and was intended to detect carrier battle groups at long ranges. It would transmit the data to the missiles for its initial targeting. Locating targets accurately was initially limited to about 50 kilometres (31 mi; 27 nmi) with the missiles requiring a mid-course update if attacking targets further away. Later upgrades to the sonar allowed it to extend its range to the full 70 km (43 mi; 38 nmi) limit of the P-70 missiles. Once fired, the submarine did not have to provide any further targeting data as the missile was equipped with a radar of its own. K-222 was also fitted with an Albatros RLK-101 search radar (NATO reporting name: Snoop Tray) and a Molniya (NATO reporting name: Pert Spring) satellite-communications system.

== Construction and career ==
A profile drawing of K-222

As large-scale fabrication of titanium was unknown anywhere in the world, techniques and equipment had to be developed from scratch by the Soviets at great cost. The Sevmash shipyard had to invest in new equipment capable of shaping plates up to 60 mm (2.4 in) thick and retrain its workers to weld in an argon atmosphere and a cleanroom environment to prevent contamination of the welds. As part of that process two half-scale sections were constructed, one for testing in a pressure chamber and the other to evaluate shock resistance in Lake Ladoga. The collapse of the section under hydraulic pressure and the presence of cracks in the welds of both structures revealed that the welders at the Severodvinsk shipyard failed to follow the strict cool down time requirements. Further consultations with metallurgical experts reached the conclusion that the steel tools used to fabricate the sections were not suitable for use with titanium.

The first titanium plates were delivered in late 1961 which allowed the submarine (initially designated as K-18 and then renamed to K-162 on 27 January 1965) to be laid down on 28 December 1963. Construction of the submarine was delayed by the delivery of plates for the outer hull by the Kommunar Metallurgical Plant that were contaminated by hydrogen and cracked easily. About 20 percent of the plates for the outer hull had to be replaced which contributed to the lengthy period that the submarine remained on the slipway before being launched on 21 December 1968. Shortly afterwards, testing of the submarine revealed that 10 ballast tanks were not watertight despite careful examination and that non-titanium components were not properly isolated from the titanium hull, causing corrosion. Within the Soviet Navy, K-162 was commonly referred to as the "Golden Fish", in reference to her development and construction costs.

Commissioned on 13 December 1969 and assigned to the Soviet Red Banner Northern Fleet, the boat spent most of the next two years conducting sea trials. K-162 made her first operational patrol in the North Atlantic in September–December 1971. During this patrol, the submarine trailed an American battle group centered around the carrier USS Saratoga at high speed as it returned to the United States from the Mediterranean. During a lengthy refit that lasted from October 1972 to January 1975, the shipyard discovered a large number of cracks that required repair. Three years later, K-162 was renamed K-222.

During this time, the Soviets assessed the possibility of series production of more boats of the class and concluded that the design would have to be modified with longer-range missiles and more torpedoes to improve its combat worthiness. In addition the excessive noise at high speed eliminated the sonar system's ability to acquire targets and needed to be remedied. Coupled with the submarine's high cost, lengthy building time, and the limited resources available, the navy decided not to proceed with any more boats. Thus the design studies for derivatives like the improved Project 661M, the Project 661A armed with P-120 Malakhit (NATO designation: SS-N-9 Siren) missiles and the Project 661B armed with R-29 Vysota (NATO codename: SS-N-8 Sawfly) ballistic missiles were cancelled. Although K-222 was not regarded as a successful design, the technology developed for the build enabled the Soviet Union to construct the titanium-hulled Alfa-class and Sierra-class attack submarines.

While having her reactor refueled in November 1980, K-222's crew lost the unique tools required to handle the nuclear fuel rods and the Severodvinsk facility had to refuel the boat without them. During the procedure, the entire crew decided to go to lunch ashore on 30 November, violating naval regulations as only shipyard workers remained aboard. This became a problem because the automatic safety system for the control rods had been shut down and they started to lift, causing the reactor to generate more heat without any water flowing to cool the core of the reactor. No one was monitoring the core's temperature and the workers only realized that there was a problem when an alarm sounded after a condenser ruptured and radioactive steam and water entered the machinery compartment. They were able to prevent the steam from spreading and turned on the main pumps to get water cooling the core. The commission investigating the incident recommended that the reactors be replaced by more modern ones and that an emergency diesel generator be installed, but the recommendations were rejected and the navy decided to simply repair the damage. After the repairs and decontamination, K-222 made her last operational patrol in 1981.

In 1988, the boat was placed in reserve at the naval base in Belomorsk, not far from Severodvinsk. Having lost the tools to handle the fuel rods, the navy could not find a company or organization willing or able to defuel the submarine. By 2008 cracks started appearing in the hull and the ballast tanks started taking on water. In March 2010 Sevmash began scrapping K-222 with the reactors and nuclear fuel still on board, and this was completed by 4 June.

== Bibliography ==
- Friedman, Norman (1995). "Soviet Union 1947–1991: Russian Federation and Successor States 1991–". In Chumbley, Stephen (ed.). Conway's All the World's Fighting Ships 1947–1995. Naval Institute Press. pp. 337–426. ISBN 1-55750-132-7.
- Hampshire, Edward (2018). Soviet Cruise Missile Submarines of the Cold War. Osprey Publishing. ISBN 978-1-47282-499-8.
- Pavlov, A. S. (1997). Warships of the USSR and Russia 1945–1995. Naval Institute Press. ISBN 1-55750-671-X.
- Polmar, Norman & Moore, Kenneth J. (2004). Cold War Submarines: The Design and Construction of U.S. and Soviet Submarines. Potomac Books. ISBN 978-1-57488-594-1.
- Polmar, Norman & Noot, Jurrien (1991). Submarines of the Russian and Soviet Navies, 1718–1990. Naval Institute Press. ISBN 0-87021-570-1.
- Vilches Alarcón, Alejandro A. (2022). From Juliettes to Yasens: Development and Operational History of Soviet Cruise-Missile Submarines. Europe @ War. Vol. 22. Helion & Co. ISBN 978-1-915070-68-5.
