= Cruise-missile submarine =

Submarine capable of launching cruise missiles

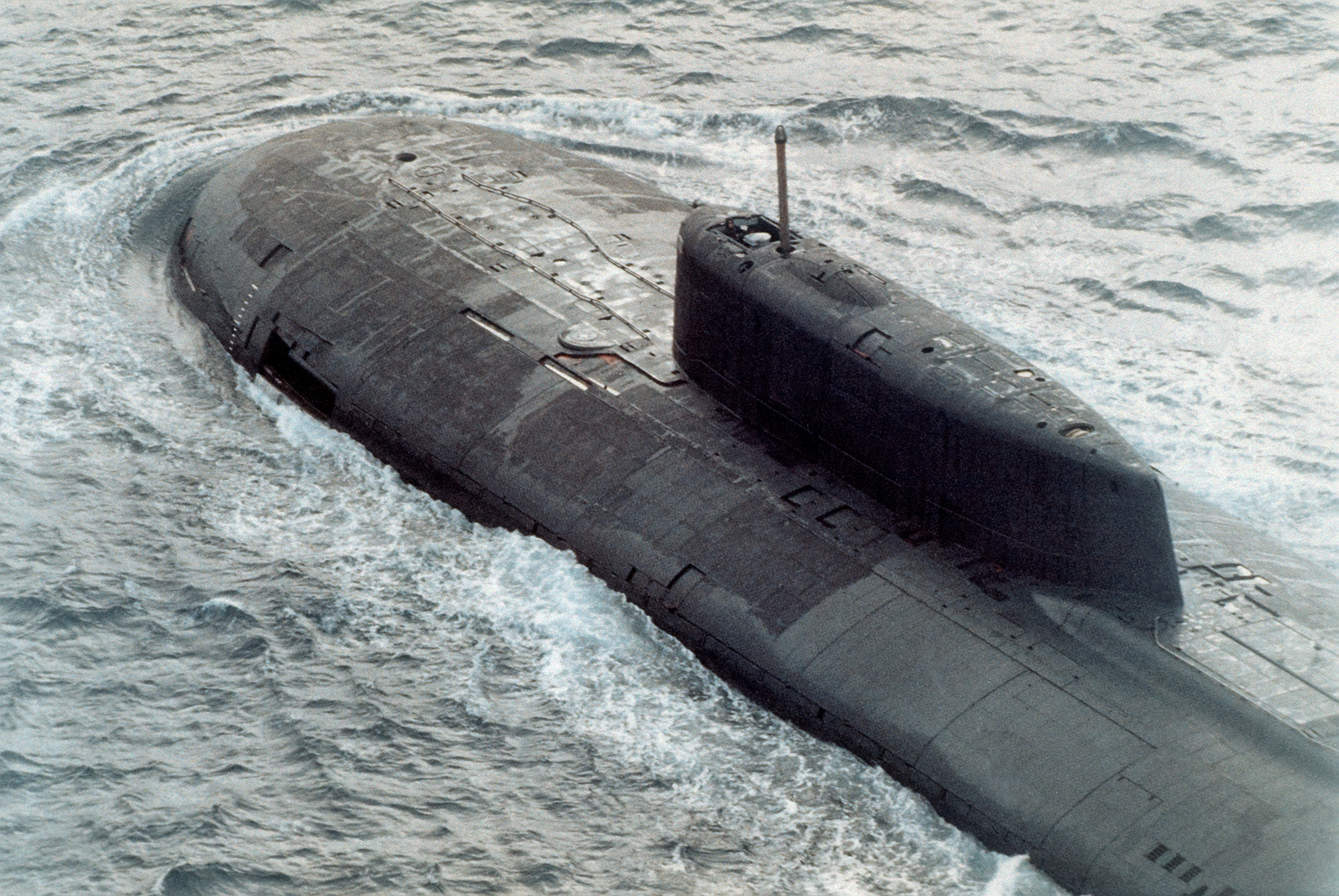
Soviet-made Oscar-class submarine of the Russian Navy. The doors for the P-700's inclined launch tubes are visible flanking the sail.

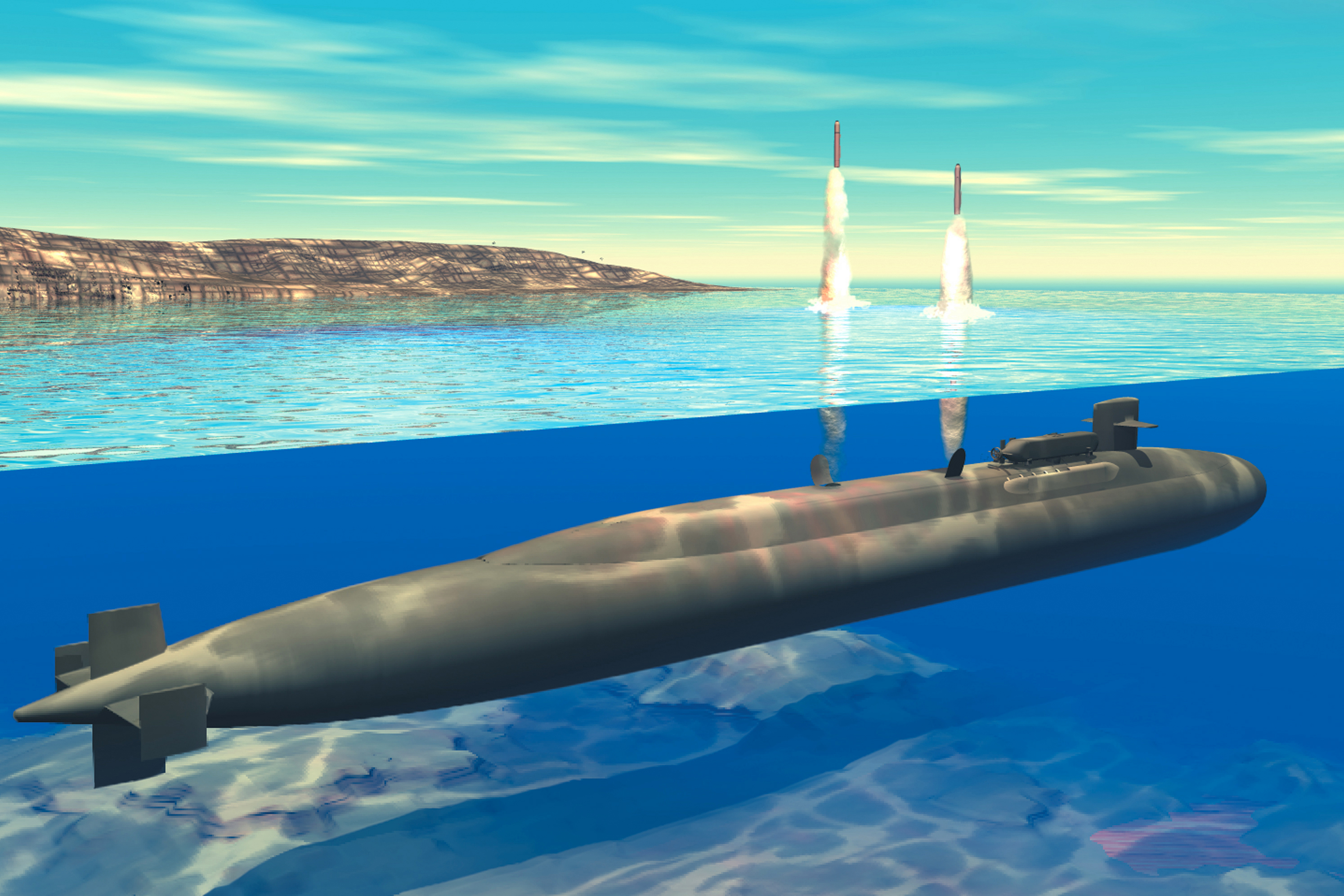
An official USN rendering of an Ohio-class submarine VLS system firing Tomahawk missiles.

A cruise missile submarine is a submarine that carries and launches cruise missiles (SLCMs consisting of land-attack cruise missiles and anti-ship missiles) as its primary armament. Missiles greatly enhance a warship's ability to attack surface combatants and strike land targets; although torpedoes are a more discreet option for submerged submarines, missiles give a much longer stand-off range, shorter time to impact the target, as well as the ability to engage multiple targets on different headings at the same time. Many cruise missile submarines retain the capability to deploy nuclear warheads on their missiles, but they are considered distinct from ballistic missile submarines due to the substantial differences between the two weapons systems' flight characteristics; cruise missiles fly aerodynamically using flight surfaces like wings or fins, while a ballistic missile uses its engine power alone as it may exit the atmosphere.

The United States Navy's hull classification symbols for cruise missile submarines are SSG and SSGN – the SS denotes submarine, the G denotes guided missile, and the N denotes that the submarine is nuclear-powered.

The earliest designs of cruise missile submarines had to surface to launch their missiles, while later designs could do so underwater via dedicated vertical launching system (VLS) tubes. Many modern attack submarines can launch cruise missiles (and dedicated anti-ship missiles) from their torpedo tubes while some designs also incorporate a small number of VLS canisters, giving an overlap between cruise missile submarines and traditional attack submarines. Nonetheless, vessels classified as attack submarines are designed to use torpedoes as their main armament and have a more multi-role mission profile due to their greater speed and maneuverability. This is in contrast to cruise missile submarines which are typically larger, slower boats carrying a larger number of missiles and often possess a special compartment dedicated solely to the cruise missile tubes.

However, the line between SSGNs and SSNs is blurring, as new generations of SSNs increasingly carry cruise missiles. French Suffren-class nuclear submarines carry long-range MdCN cruise missiles launched not from vertical launchers (VLS) but from standard 533mm torpedo tubes.

== U.S. Navy ==
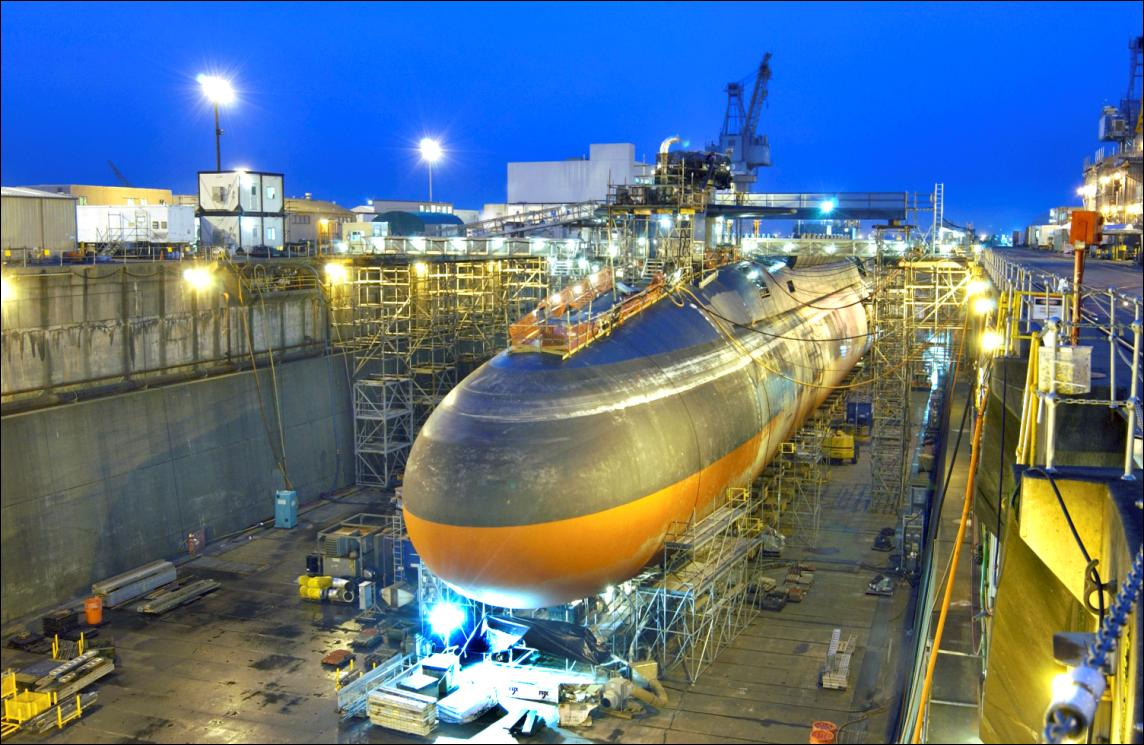
USS Ohio undergoing conversion to a cruise missile submarine

The U.S. Navy's first cruise missile submarines were developed in the early 1950s to carry the SSM-N-8 Regulus missile. The first of these was a converted World War II era Gato-class submarine, USS Tunny, which was fitted with a hangar capable of carrying a pair of Regulus missiles. Tunny was used as a test-bed for developing techniques of use for the missile system, before a second boat, USS Barbero was subsequently converted. Starting in 1957, these two boats undertook the first nuclear deterrent patrols.

Subsequently, two larger diesel submarines of the Grayback-class were purpose built for the carriage of the Regulus missile, with each capable of accommodating up to four missiles, while a further boat, the nuclear-powered USS Halibut, could carry up to five missiles. Between September 1959 and July 1964, the five Regulus missile boats undertook deterrent patrols in the Pacific Ocean, in concert with the newly commissioned George Washington-class ballistic missile submarines (SSBN) in the Atlantic, until sufficient SSBNs were in service to replace them.

From 2002 to 2008, the U.S. Navy modified the four oldest Ohio-class ballistic missile submarines: Ohio, Michigan, Florida, and Georgia into SSGNs. The conversion was achieved by installing VLS in a multiple all-up-round canister (MAC) configuration in 22 of the 24 missile tubes, replacing one Trident missile with seven smaller Tomahawk cruise missiles. The two remaining tubes were converted to lockout chambers for use by special forces personnel. This gave each converted submarine the capability to carry up to 154 Tomahawks. The large diameter tubes can also be modified to carry and launch other payloads, such as UAVs or UUVs although these capabilities have not yet been fully implemented. In addition to generating a significant increase in stand-off strike capabilities, this conversion also counts as an arms reduction towards the START II treaty, because it reduces the number of nuclear weapons that are forward-deployed. USS Florida (SSGN-728) launched cruise missiles against Libyan targets as part of Operation Odyssey Dawn in March 2011.

Currently, Virginia-class submarines (Block I–IV) serve as universal ships, both attack submarines and cruise-missile submarines with 12 × Vertical launching system (VLS) for Tomahawk cruise missiles. The future Virginia-class (Block V) submarines with 40 Tomahawk cruise missiles are slated to supplement and eventually replace the Ohio SSGNs when they are retired; USS Ohio itself is more than 40 years old.

US Navy SSGNs

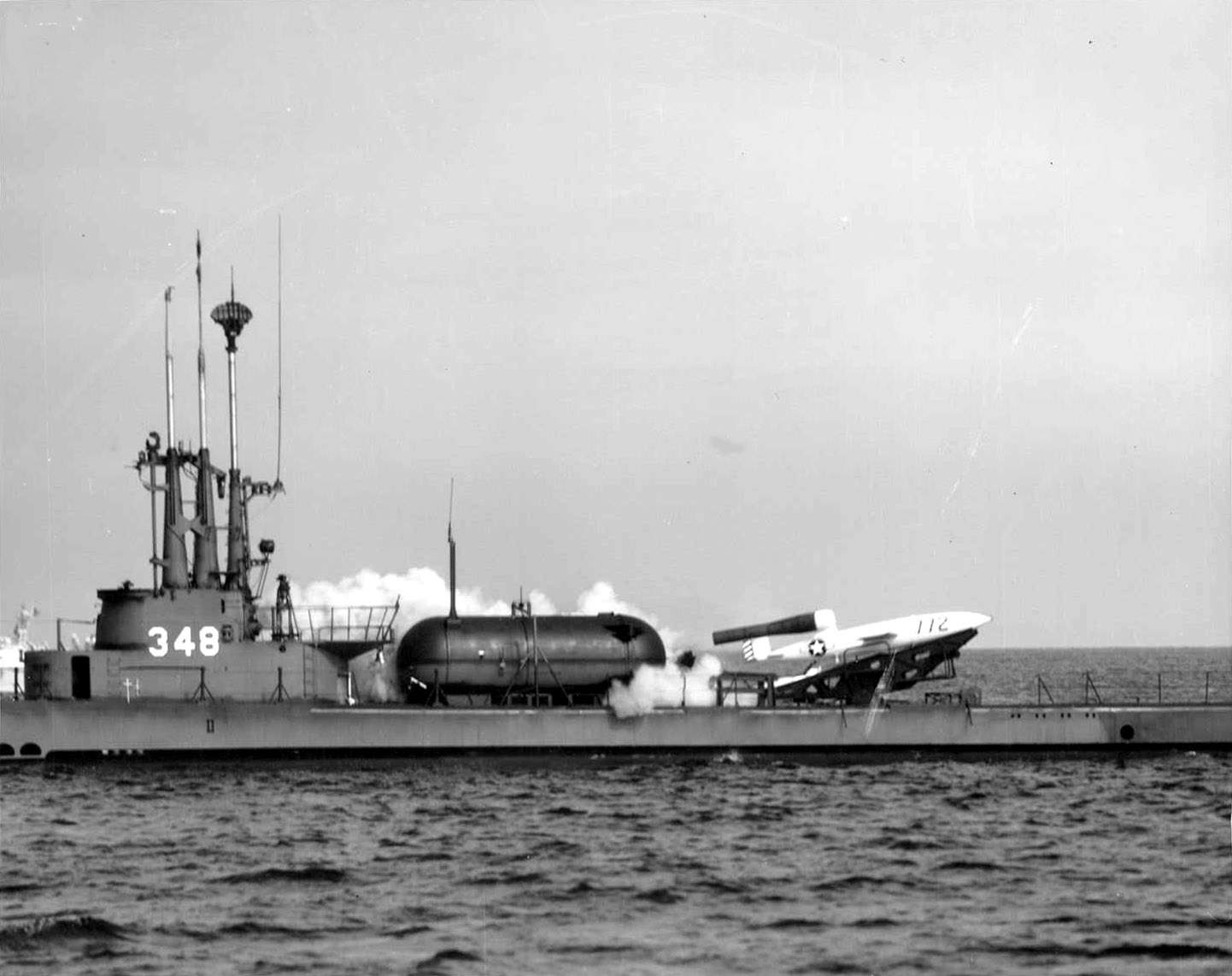
USS Cusk fires a JB-2 Loon missile, 1951

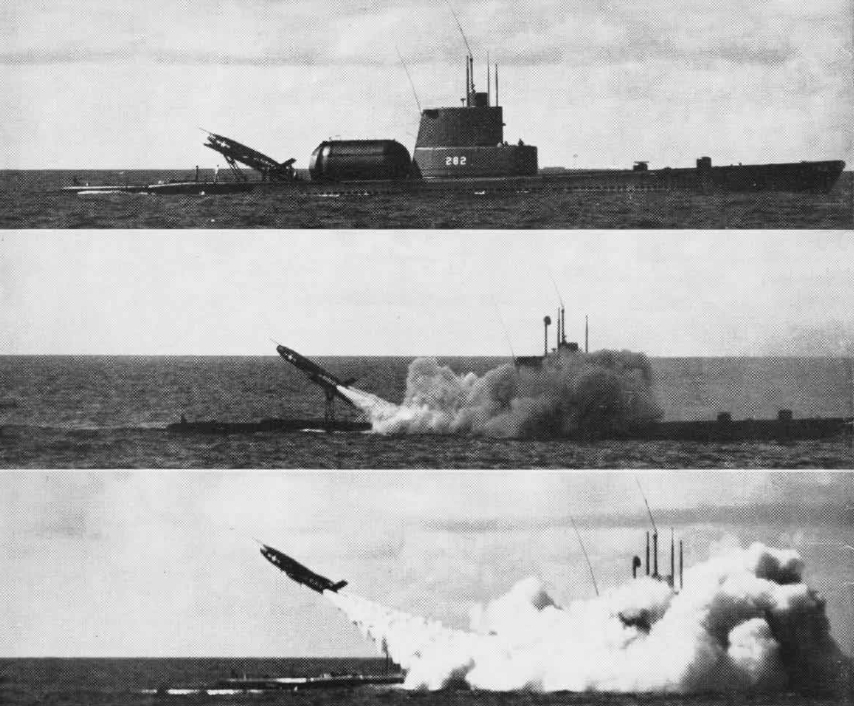
USS Tunny fires a Regulus I, 1956

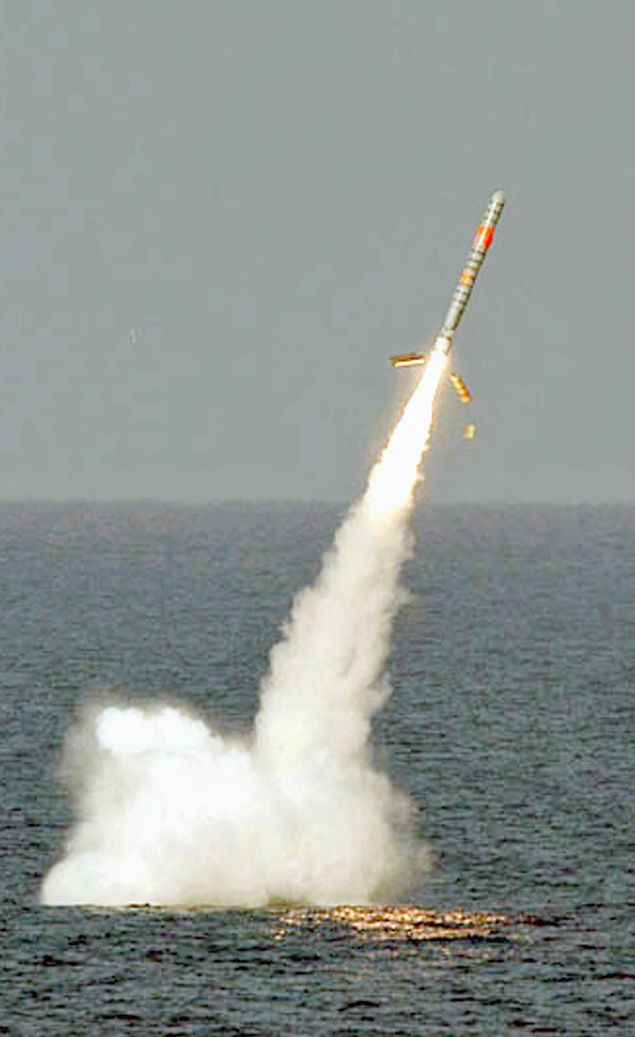
Tomahawk test-fire from USS Florida, 2008

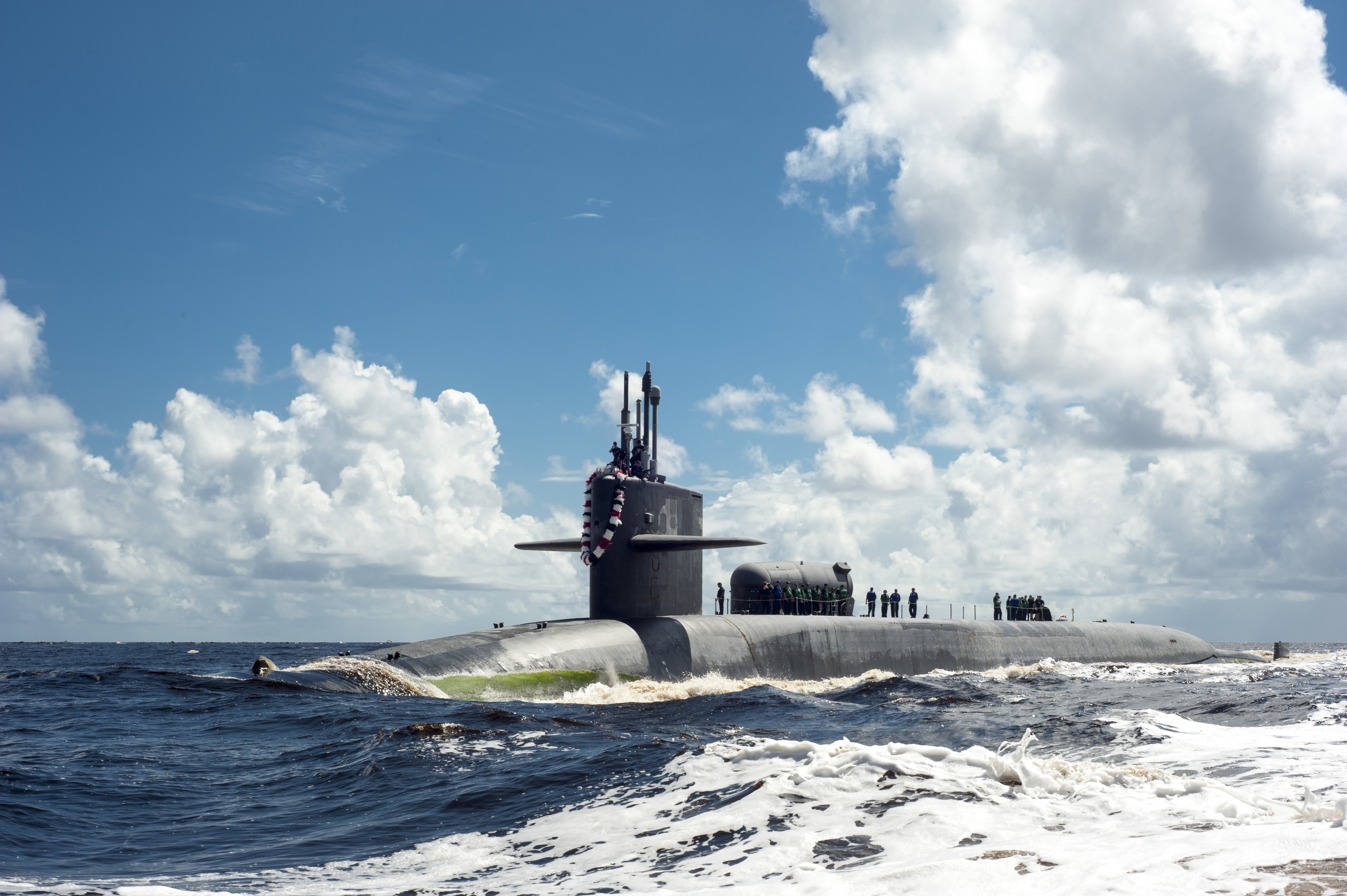
USS Georgia underway, 2012

== Soviet Navy/Russian Navy ==
The Soviet Navy (and its successor, the Russian Navy) has operated a wide variety of dedicated cruise missile submarines (unbolded project numbers were prototypes/never entered military service):

Soviet and Russian submarine classes
Entered Service	NATO reporting name	Project Name and Number	Ship Class (US)	Planform	Missiles carried
1957	(Modified) Zulu	П611	SSG		1 x П-10
1958	Whiskey Single Cylinder	П613	SSG		1 x П-5 Пятёрка (SS-N-3 Shaddock)
1962 1964	(Modified) Whiskey	613А 613АД	SSG		1 x П-70 Аметист (SS-N-7 Starbright)
1960	Whiskey Twin Cylinder	644	SSG		2 x П-5 Пятёрка (SS-N-3 Shaddock) 2 х П-5Д under Project 644Д and 2 х П-7 under Project 644-7
1961	Whiskey Long Bin	665	SSG		4 x П-5 Пятёрка (SS-N-3 Shaddock)
1963	Juliett	651 651К	SSG		4 х П-5/6 Пятёрка (SS-N-3 Shaddock)
1986	(Modified) Juliett	651Э	SSGN		4 х П-5/6 Пятёрка (SS-N-3 Shaddock)
1960	Echo I	659	SSGN		6 x П-5 Пятёрка (SS-N-3 Shaddock)
1963	Echo II	675	SSGN		6 x П-5/6 Пятёрка (SS-N-3 Shaddock) Later 8 x P-500 Базальт (SS-N-12 Sandbox) under the 675МК and 675МУ program and 8 x P-1000 Вулкан under Project 675МКВ
1969	Papa	661 "Anchar"	SSGN		10 x П-70 Аметист (SS-N-7 Starbright)
1967	Charlie I	670 "Skat"	SSGN		8 x П-70 Аметист (SS-N-7 Starbright)
1973	Charlie II	670M "Skat"	SSGN		8 x П-120 Малахит (SS-N-9 Siren)
1992+ (scrapped underway)	Charlie III	06704 "Chaika-B"	SSGN		8 x 3 П-800 Оникс (triple-tube inserts)
1980	Oscar I	949 "Granit"	SSGN		24 x П-700 Гранит (SS-N-19 Shipwreck)
1986	Oscar II	949A "Antey"	SSGN		24 x П-700 Гранит (SS-N-19 Shipwreck) Plans for Project 949АМ upgrade to fit missiles compatible with UKSK VLS; П-800 Оникс, Клуб, 3M22 Циркон; triple-tube inserts (3 x 24)
1987	Yankee Notch	667AT "Grusha"	SSGN/SSN		32 x РК-55 Гранат (SS-N-12 Sampson)
1989 (missile program cancelled)	Yankee Sidecar	667M "Andromeda"	SSGN		12 x П-750 Метеорит (SS-NX-24 Scorpion)
2013	Yasen	885 "Yasen"	SSGN		П-800 Оникс, Калибр family, 3М22 Циркон
2021	Yasen-M/Yasen-II	885М Yasen-M	SSGN		П-800 Оникс, Калибр family, 3М22 Циркон

Khruschev encouraged the development of missiles in the Soviet Union; thus the issues of effective nuclear deterrence and delivery and US Carrier Strike Groups were to be solved through advances in missilery. Submerged submarines are more concealable than surface ships; missiles carried upon them were therefore safer from attack by NATO surface fleets, land-based aircraft, and long-range patrol bombers. Thus the strategic and tactical strike missions were solved through the equipment of submarines with large, long-range cruise missiles: first through the modification of existing boats, then by boats being built for the task.

The Whiskey variants and Echo I cruise missile submarines deployed with a nuclear land attack version of the P-5 Pyatyorka (SS-N-3 Shaddock) from the late 1950s to 1964, concurrently with the US Regulus force, until the strategic land attack mission was transferred entirely to the SSBN force. Along with the Julietts and Echo IIs, these continued as SSGs or SSGNs with an antiship variant of the P-5 until circa 1990. The Echo Is were an exception; they could not accommodate the anti-ship targeting radar and served as SSNs after the land attack missiles were withdrawn.

Apart from true guided-missile submarines, late-Soviet attack submarines could launch various types of torpedo tube-launched missiles starting with the RK-55 and continuing with the Kalibr family of missiles. Cruise-missile capable Soviet submarines may have a different designation to incapable sister boats (Victor III (Project 671RTM) boats became Project 671RTMK as they gained this ability, K for Крылатая ракета; cruise missile). Due to standardization of torpedo tube diameters, which are 533 mm, modern Russian attack submarine classes (even the diesel Kilo and Lada) are capable of launching long-range strategic cruise missiles from their torpedo tubes, without needing specialized compartments for missile tubes.

Soviet and Russian ДПЛРК and ПЛАРК (Diesel-/Atomic Cruise-missile Submarines)

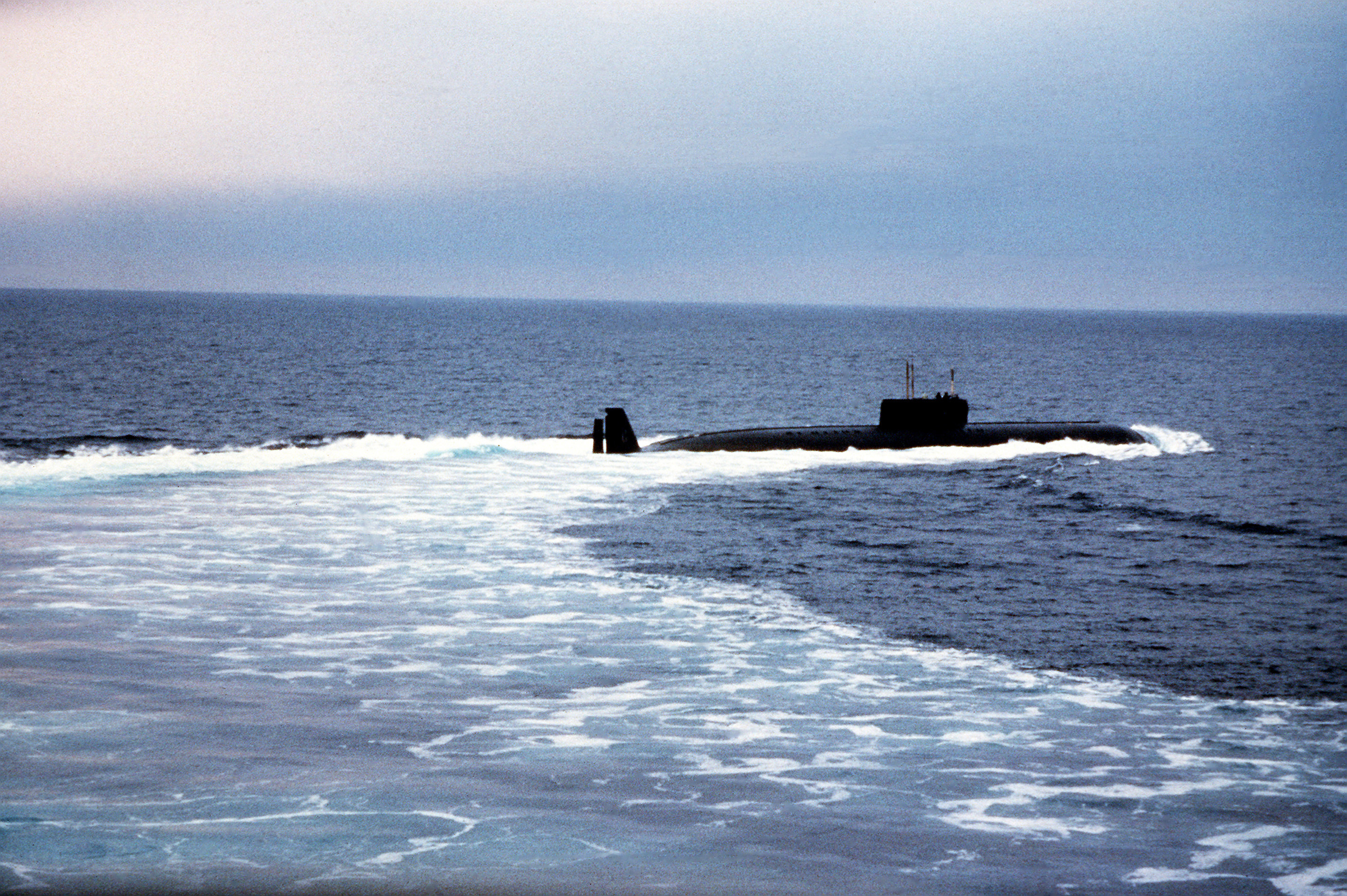
K-222, the sole Project 661 submarine underway, 1983

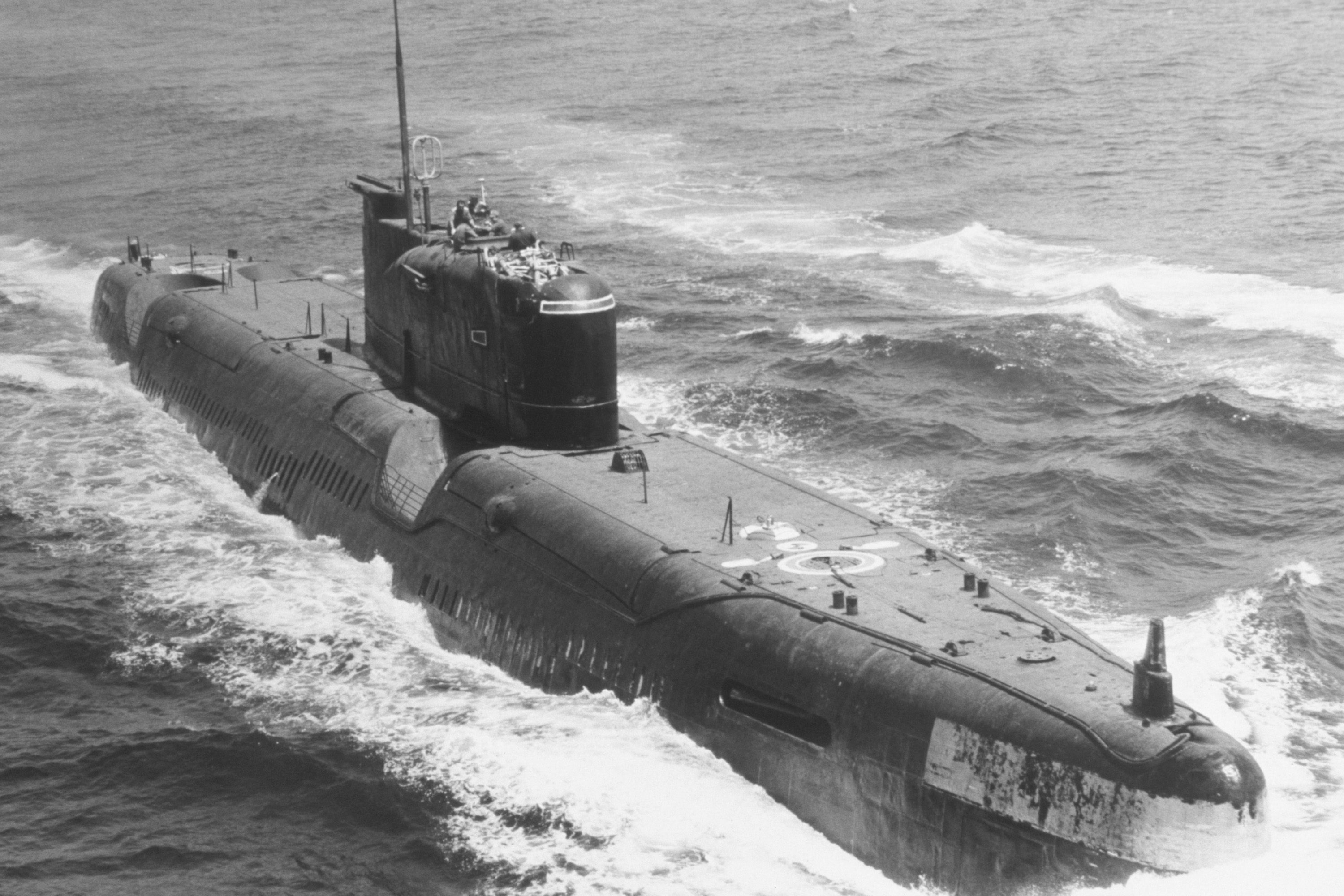
A Project 651 boat underway, 1986

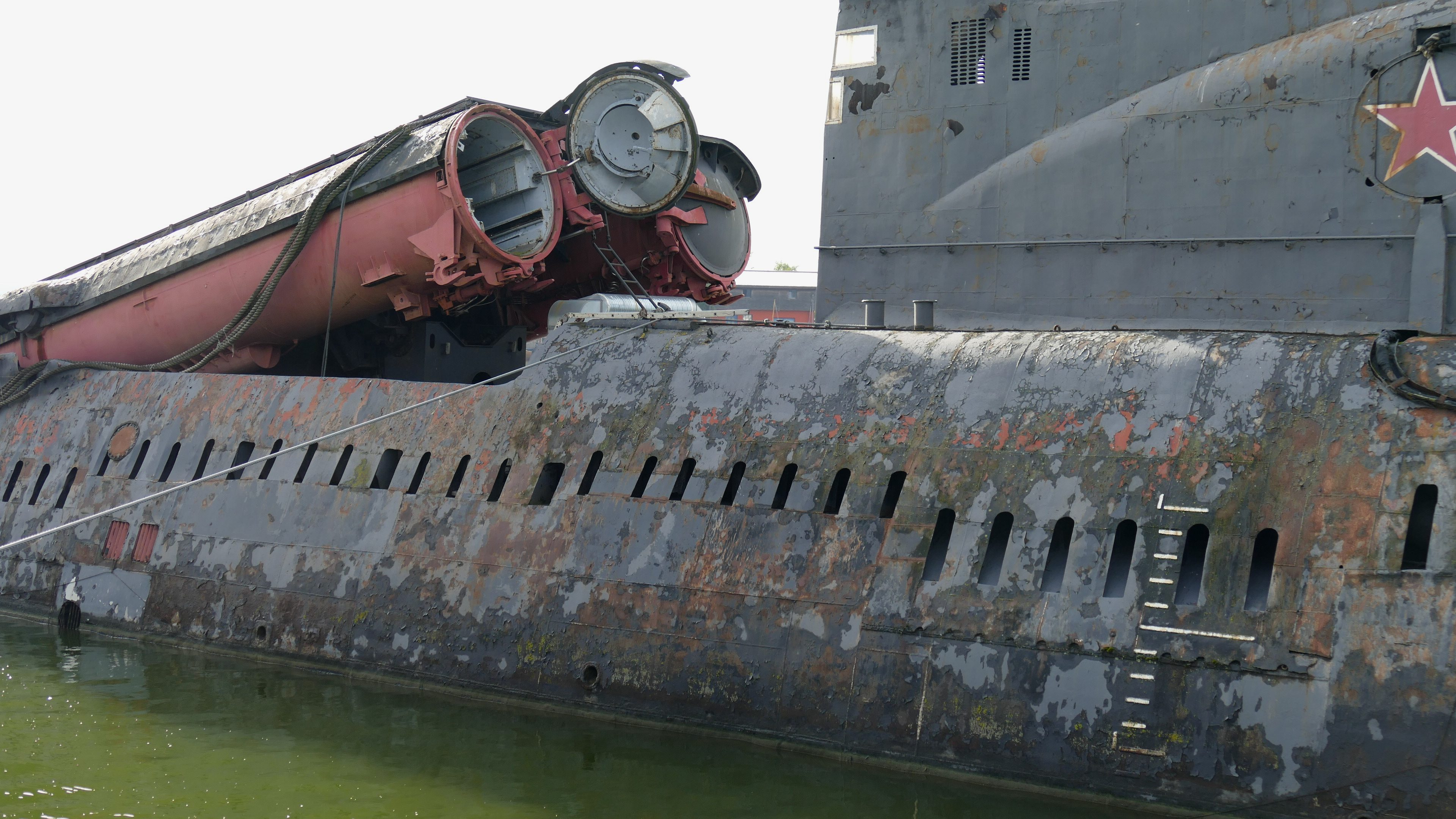
K-24 (now U-461 of the Peenemünde Maritime Museum), Project 651 Juliett cruise missile submarine, with rear SS-N-3 Shaddock launch tubes in raised position

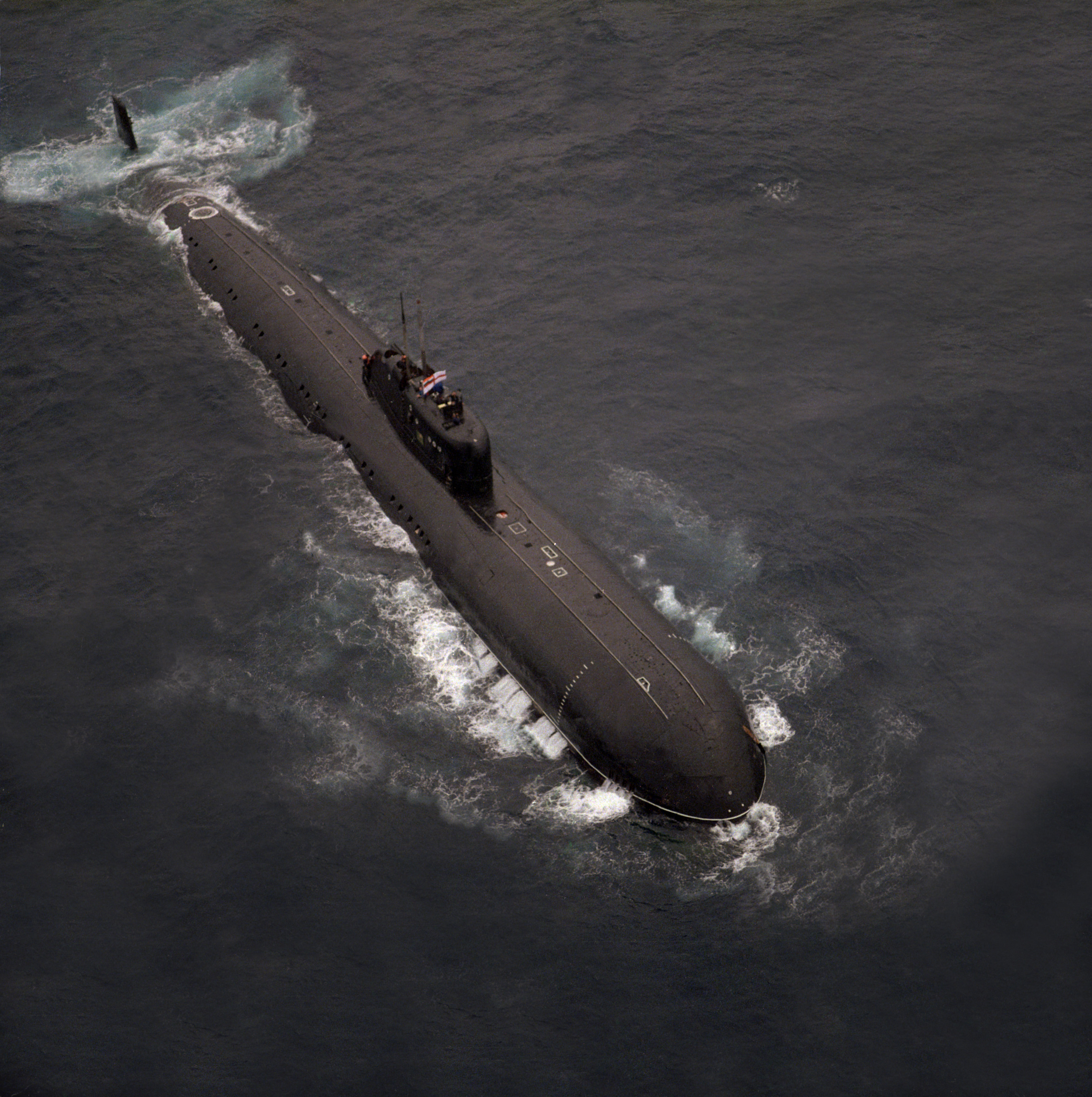
Soviet K-43 underway, c. 1987

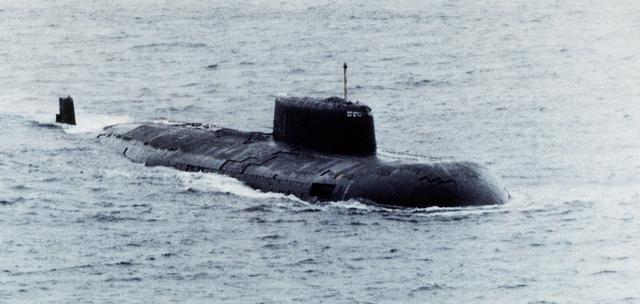
Project 949 (Oscar-I) underway. The Oscar-classes are notably girthy; the very large P-700 missiles were placed outside the pressure hull, twelve launch tubes on each side

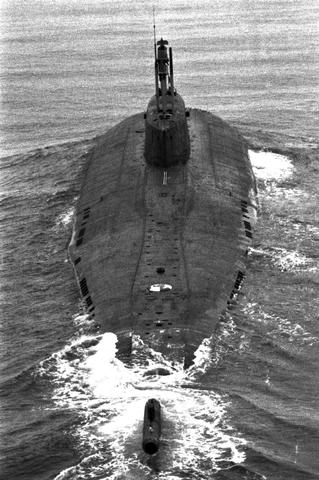
Project 949A (Oscar-II) underway. Pr. 949A boats had a different tail fin which accommodated the towed-array sonar (cylinder visible at the bottom of photo), an easy way to distinguish this class from its immediate predecessor

== See also ==
- List of submarine classes in service
- List of submarine operators
- List of NATO reporting names for guided-missile submarines
- Missile boat (surface ship)
- Transporter erector launcher (land vehicle)
