= P-70 Ametist =

Soviet submarine-launched anti-ship missile

P-70 Ametist (NATO reporting name: SS-N-7 'Starbright')
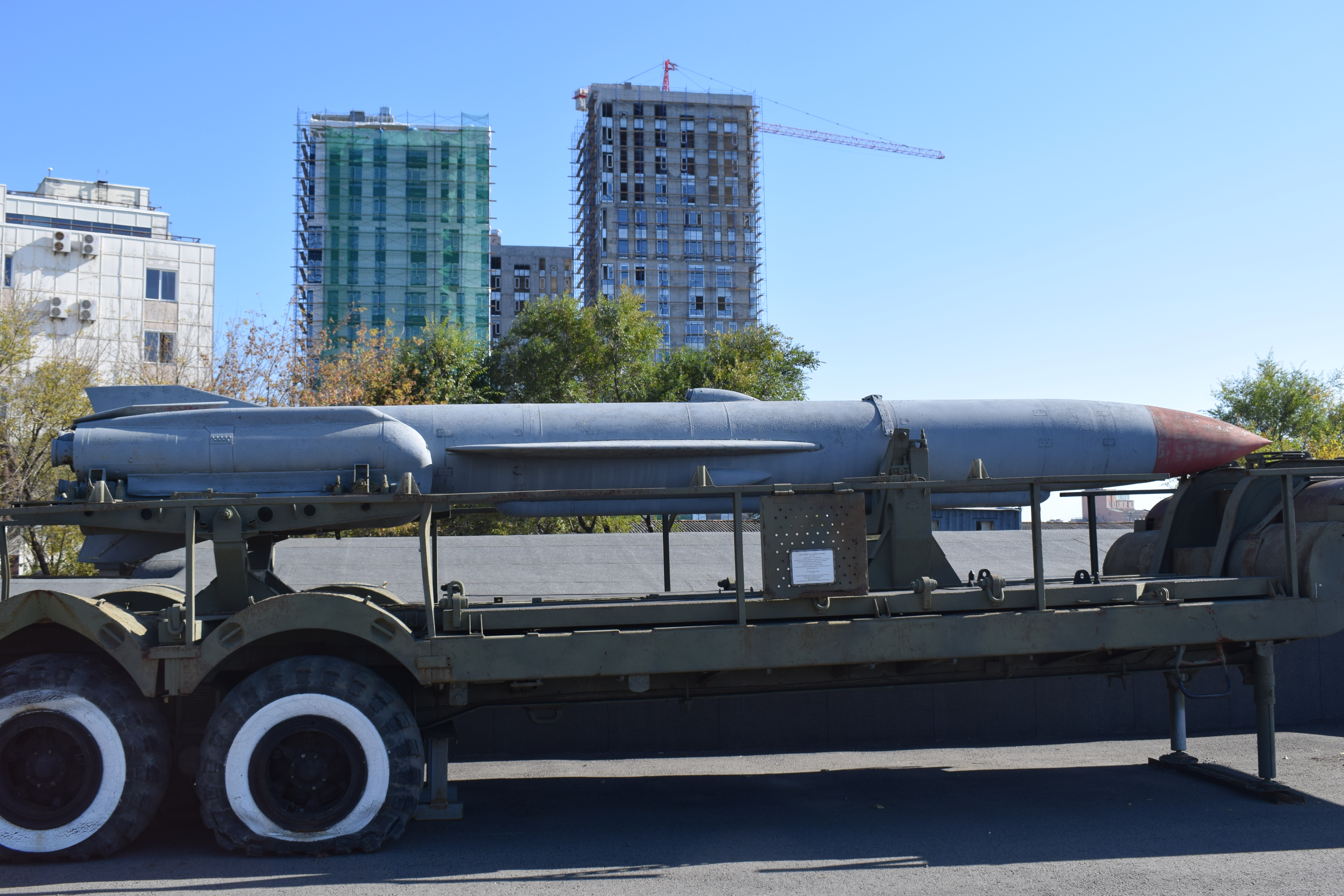
- Type: Anti-ship missile
- Place of origin: Soviet Union

Service history
- In service: 1967-1992
- Used by: Soviet Union, Russia, India, North Korea (unconfirmed)

Production history
- Designer: Vladimir Chelomey
- Designed: 1958 - 1968
- Manufacturer: NPO Mashinostroyeniye
- Produced: 1966 - 1987
- No. built: 631

Specifications
- Mass: 3,500 kg (7,700 lb)
- Length: 7 m (23 ft)
- Warhead: 4G66 HEAT Warhead or 200 kt nuclear
- Warhead weight: 1,000 kg (2,200 lb)
- Propellant: Solid fuel
- Operational range: 65 km (35 nmi)
- Boost time: 7 seconds (tube exit to main stage)
- Maximum depth: 30 m (98 ft)
- Maximum speed: Mach 1.0
- Guidance system: Inertial guidance, terminal active radar homing
- Launch platform: Charlie-I & Papa class SSGNs

The P-70 Ametist (NATO reporting name: SS-N-7 Starbright, GRAU designation 4K66; Russian: П-70 «Аметист» 'Amethyst') was an anti-ship missile carried by Soviet and Indian Project 670 submarines, as well as the Soviet Project 661 Anchar. It was soon succeeded by the P-120 Malakhit (SS-N-9 'Siren').

Fielded on June 3 1968, it was the first anti-ship missile system in the world to be launched from a submerged submarine. From 1968 to 1987, a total of 631 missiles were built.

== Development ==
The P-5 Pyatyorka (SS-N-3 Shaddock) missile required the Project 659 submarines carrying them to stay surfaced after firing to send mid-flight guidance updates. This made submarines very vulnerable to enemy attack, so in the 1960s the Soviets started working on a new missile that could be fired whilst submerged, and a submarine would carry it. These became the P-120 Malakhit and Project 670 submarine.

However, problems with the engines of the P-120 Malakhit forced the Soviets to design a sub-launched missile based on the P-15M Termit (SS-N-2C 'Styx') as a stopgap measure for the first batch of Charlie submarines. This became the P-20L, later renamed the P-70 Ametist.

== Design ==
The P-15M was fitted with an L band active radar homing sensor and a new radar altimeter both developed for the P-120, but there was no room for a datalink in the smaller P-15M. Folding wings were added to reduce the size of the missile, and the missile could be launched at a maximum depth of 30 m (98 ft).

The short range of the P-70 meant it could rely on inertial navigation and radar-homing, and as such did not need mid-course updates from a radar on the submarine. Consequently, along with the addition of the radar-altimeter (which allowed for a much lower cruise altitude than previous missiles), the novel sub-surface launch capability meant that reaction time for surface targets was minimal.

As a result, the ability to deploy in littoral and close-range combat scenarios without necessitating exposure of the launching submarine more than made up for its lack of range compared to the P-5.

== Operational history ==
The P-70 went into service with the Soviet Navy on the first Project 670, on June 3, 1968. About 200 were produced.

India leased the "Chakra" Project 670 submarine from January 1988 to 1992, to gain experience of operating a nuclear submarine.

== Operators ==
Soviet Union
Russia
India
North Korea
