= Soviet submarine K-43 =

Soviet-made Charlie-class nuclear-powered cruise missile submarine

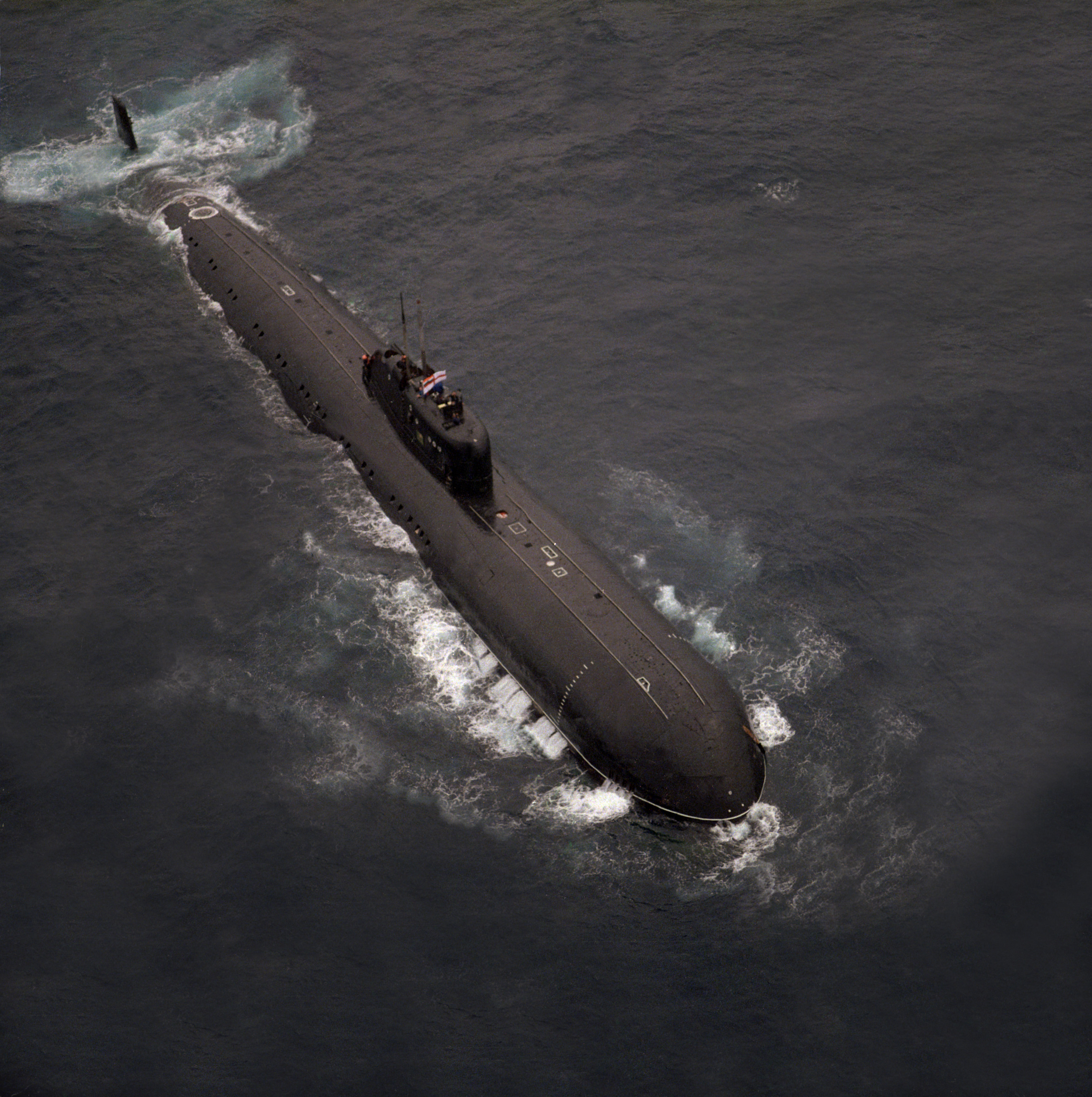
- INS Chakra on its way to India in the 1980s

History

Soviet Union
- Name: K-43
- Builder: Gorky
- Laid down: 9 May 1964
- Launched: 2 August 1966
- Commissioned: 5 November 1967
- Recommissioned: February 1991
- Decommissioned: 30 July 1992
- In service: 1967–1988; 1991–1992
- Fate: Sold for scrap

India
- Name: Chakra
- Namesake: Sudarshan Chakra
- Commissioned: 1 September 1987
- Decommissioned: January 1991
- In service: 1987–1990
- Home port: Vishakhapatnam
- Fate: Returned to Soviet Union after 3 years

General characteristics
- Class & type: Charlie-class cruise missile submarine
- Displacement: Surfaced: 4000 tons; Submerged: 5000 tons
- Length: 95 m (312 ft)
- Beam: 10 m (33 ft)
- Draught: 8 m (26 ft)
- Propulsion: One pressurized water-cooled reactor powering two steam turbines delivering 11,185 kW (14,999 shp) to one shaft.
- Speed: Surfaced: 20 knots (37 km/h; 23 mph); Submerged: 24 knots (44 km/h; 28 mph)
- Range: Unlimited except by food supplies
- Complement: about 100
- Armament: 8 x SS-N-7 Starbright anti-ship cruise missiles; 6 x 21 in (530 mm) torpedo tubes (12 torpedoes or 12 SS-N-15 Starfish anti-submarine missiles)

K-43 was a Charlie-class nuclear-powered cruise missile submarine operated by the Soviet and Indian navies. It was built between 1964 and 1967 and was commissioned into the Soviet navy on 5 November 1967. It later served as INS Chakra in the Indian Navy from 1988 to 1991.

It was leased to India on 1 September 1987 and reached its base in Visakhapatnam on 3 February 1988 after a long journey. The Soviets said that the submarine was transferred for helping train the Indian Navy in operating nuclear submarines. During its service with India, it was partially manned by a Soviet crew, who reportedly did not allow Indians into the missile room and into the reactor compartment and this is believed to be a reason for the termination of the contract after 3 years. The lease of Chakra reportedly helped India gain first-hand experience in handling a nuclear submarine that helped them build the Arihant class of nuclear submarines.

== Description ==
K-43 had a length of 94 m (308 ft) overall, a beam of 10 m (33 ft) and a draft of 8 m (26 ft). It displaced 4,000 tonnes (3,900 long tons; 4,400 short tons) surfaced and 5,000 tonnes (4,900 long tons; 5,500 short tons) while submerged. The complement of the submarine was about 100.

The boat had one five-blade propeller powered by a VM-5 pressurised water reactor. It can achieve a maximum speed of 16 knots (30 km/h; 18 mph) when surfaced and 23 knots (43 km/h; 26 mph) when submerged. The K-43 could carry up to 8 SS-N-7 Starbright nuclear capable anti-ship cruise missiles. It had six 533 mm (21 in) torpedo tubes which could carry 12 torpedoes or 12 SS-N-15 Starfish anti-submarine missiles.

== History ==
In October 1986, the Soviet Politburo declared that they intend to transfer a Charlie-class submarine to India for training purposes. It was the first time a nuclear submarine was ever transferred to any other country. It was decided so as to prove Soviet Union's commitment to strengthening India. But some politicians expressed serious negative consequences due to the transfer. However, the politburo headed by Gorbachev decided that the political benefits outweighed the concerns.

The Soviets, during the lease to India, would regularly inspect the submarine and handle the nuclear fuel. The Soviet media stated that the submarine would not carry any nuclear weapons.

=== Transfer to India ===
A new naval base was constructed at Visakhapatnam with the help of the Soviet Union for handling the submarine. An Indian crew reached a training centre at Kirova for a two-year training course. The Indian Ambassador, Nurul Hasan, visited the Indian crew during this time.

== Operational history ==
The submarine was built between 1964 and 1967 and was commissioned into the Soviet navy on 5 November 1967. After returning to the Soviet Union after its lease to India, it continued to be in service with the Soviet Navy and was finally decommissioned on 30 July 1992 and sold for scrap.

=== Service in the Indian Navy ===
The submarine left for India on 5 January 1988 from Vladivostok and was commissioned into the Indian Navy on the same day. Captain R. N. Ganesh was the commissioning commanding officer of the boat. It passed through the South China Sea and Malacca Strait where it was escorted by an Indian frigate, INS Dunagiri. It was constantly tracked by American and Australian P-3 Orion aircraft throughout the journey. It arrived at Visakhapatnam on 3 February 1988. The submarine was welcomed by the Indian Prime Minister Rajiv Gandhi, the Defence Minister K. C. Pant, the Chief of Naval Staff Jayant Ganpat Nadkarni, and the commander of Eastern Naval Command, Vice Admiral S. C. Chopra, who sailed in the submarine into the sea.

Chakra took part in the President's fleet review of 15 February 1989 at Mumbai when it was watched by millions of Indians on television. Transfer of the submarine gained widespread coverage in the international media with Time Magazine calling India an "Awakening Power", while the Washington Post called it an "Oriental Bully".

Contrary to popular perception, the Chakra was partially manned and controlled by the Soviet crew, who reportedly did not allow Indians into the missile room and into the reactor compartment. Despite repeated Indian requests and efforts, the soviets refused. The submarine also encountered multiple equipment failures and corrosions due to operating in the hot, humid and saline waters of the Indian Ocean. The quality of spare parts and services from the Soviet Navy was lackluster, with several batches being sent with poor quality controls, leading to a fire while docked. This incident is believed to be a reason for the termination of the contract after 3 years by India.

The Chakra served in both the Eastern and Western Commands during her service. As the lease agreement ended, Chakra departed to the Soviet Union from Visakhapatnam on 16 December 1990 and was escorted by INS Savitri throughout its journey. She reached Vladivostok on January 5 1991 following which she was recommissioned into the Soviet Navy. The ageing submarine sailed to Kamchatka for decommissioning in 1992.

During her career with the Indian Navy, she had sailed over 72,000 miles with over 430 days spent at sea and had fired five missiles and 42 torpedoes. For the longer term, the lease of Chakra reportedly helped India gain first-hand experience in handling a nuclear submarine that helped them build the Arihant class of nuclear submarines in 2010s and paved the way for the lease of an Akula Class submarine in 2011 bearing the same name.

== See also ==
- India-Soviet Union Relations
- Submarines of the Indian Navy

== Bibliography ==
- Polmar, Norman & Noot, Jurrien (1991). Submarines of the Russian and Soviet Navies, 1718–1990. Annapolis, Maryland: Naval Institute Press. ISBN 0-87021-570-1.
- Vilches Alarcón, Alejandro A. (2022). From Juliettes to Yasens: Development and Operational History of Soviet Cruise-Missile Submarines. Europe @ War (22). Warwick, UK: Helion & Co. ISBN 978-1-915070-68-5.
