= Charlie-class submarine =

Russian nuclear cruise missile submarine class

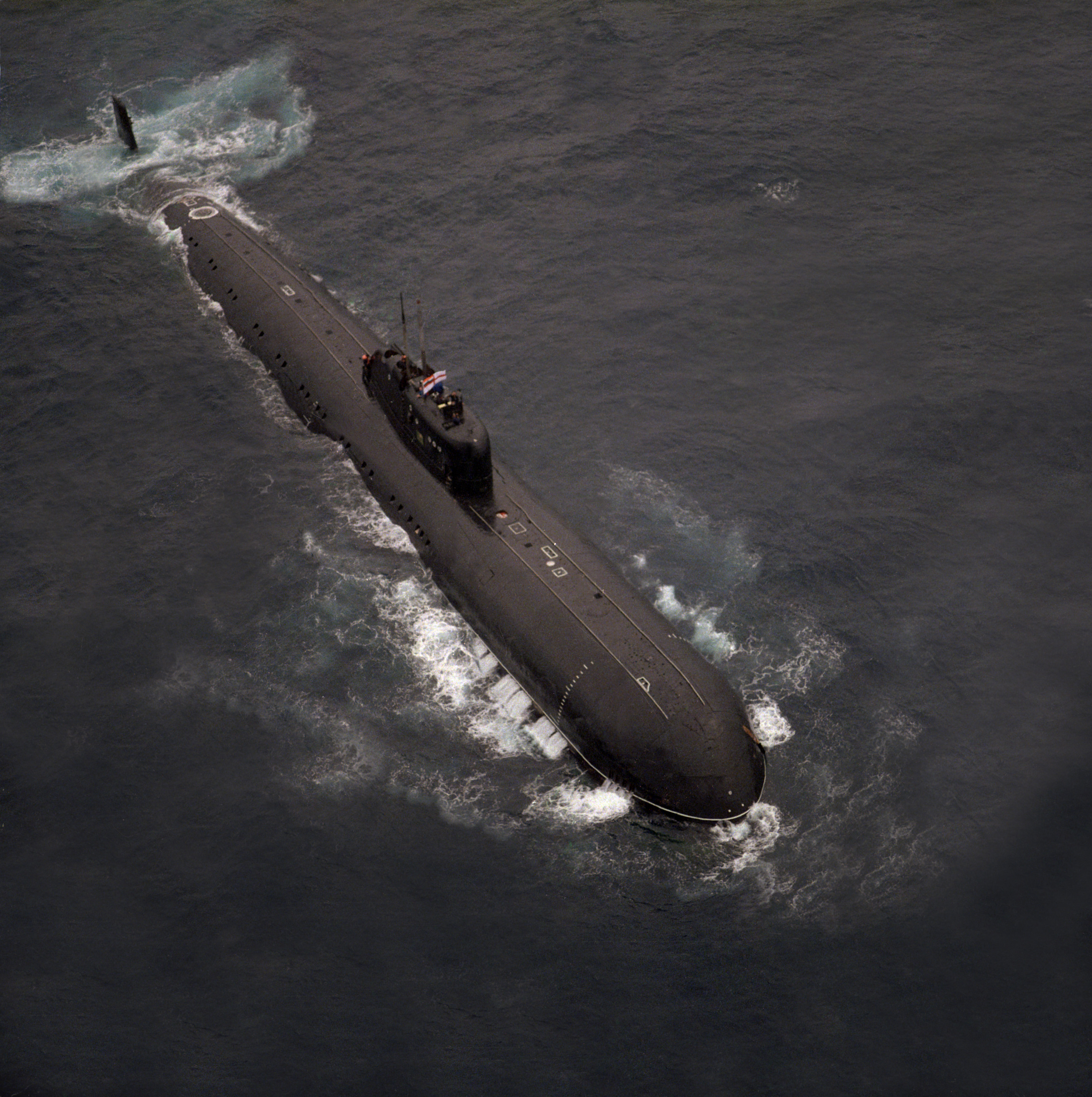
- INS Chakra leased to the Indian Navy

Class overview
- Name: Charlie class
- Builders: Gorky
- Operators: Soviet Navy; Indian Navy
- Preceded by: Echo class; Juliett class
- Succeeded by: Oscar class; Papa class

General characteristics
- Type: Submarine
- Displacement: Charlie I class: Surfaced: 4,000 tons; Submerged: 4,900 tons; Charlie II class: Surfaced: 4,300 tons; Submerged: 5,100 tons
- Length: Charlie I class: 95 m (312 ft); Charlie II class: 103 m (338 ft)
- Beam: 10 m (32 ft 10 in)
- Draught: 8 m (26 ft 3 in)
- Propulsion: 1 pressurized water-cooled reactor powering 2 steam turbines delivering 11,185 kW (14,999 shp) to 1 shaft
- Speed: Surfaced: 20 knots (37 km/h; 23 mph); Submerged: 24 knots (44 km/h; 28 mph)
- Range: Unlimited except by food supplies
- Complement: Charlie I class: 100; Charlie II class: 98
- Armament: 6 × 533 mm (21 in) tubes all bow for a max load of 12 torpedoes.; Charlie I: 8x P-70 Ametist anti-ship missiles; Charlie II: 8x P-120 Malakhit anti-ship missiles; 24 AMD-1000 ground mines.

The Project 670 Skat submarine (NATO classification Charlie class) was a nuclear-powered cruise missile submarine built for the Soviet Navy and later operated by the Russian Navy. All Charlie I/II-class submarines are decommissioned. One Charlie-class submarine was used for testing an Oniks missile. Charlie I and its successor Charlie II-class submarines are designed by the Lazurit Central Design Bureau of Gorky.

== Background ==
The Charlie I-class submarine (Project 670 Skat) SSGN was first launched at the Krasnoye Sormovo inland shipyard at Gorkiy in 1967 with another ten following over a period of five years. The Charlie Is had two banks of four missile tubes angled upwards on each side of the bow outside the pressure hull. The tubes were covered by large outer doors and the design was to incorporate the P-120 Malakhit (SS-N-9 Siren) medium-range anti-ship missile. Due to delays in the missile development, the missile was substituted with the shorter range P-70 Ametist (SS-N-7 Starbright) submerged launch missile which itself was a development of the P-15 Termit (SS-N-2 Styx) surface-launched missile. The missiles were designed for pop up surprise attacks on high value surface targets such as aircraft carriers.

In 1972 to 1979, six improved units called the Project 670M Skat-M (Charlie II class) were built. The improved Charlie IIs were built at Gorkiy with an 8 m (26 ft 3 in) insert in the hull forward of the fin. The insert incorporated electronics and launch systems for targeting and firing of the longer range P-120 Malakhit anti-ship missile.

The Charlie Is and IIs returned to port for reload once they had expended their missile payloads. However, the Charlie class's secondary armament of torpedoes and sonar systems provided useful anti-ship and anti-submarine warfare capabilities in addition to their missile launch capabilities.

The last Charlie was retired in 1994. While still operational, one unit of the class was leased to the Indian Navy between 1988 and 1991 The submarine, INS Chakra was used to train Indian Navy sailors and also was used to design elements of the Arihant-class SSBN.

== Boats ==
- 11 Project 670 (Charlie I) submarines were built between 1968 and 1973. K-43 was leased to the Indian Navy as Chakra from 1988 to 1992. K-429 sank near Petropavlovsk-Kamchatsky in 1983 with 16 fatalities, but was raised and used as a harbour training hulk. On 13 September 1985, K-429 sank at her moorings. She was again raised and decommissioned.
- 6 Project 670M (Charlie II) submarines were built between 1973 and 1980.

All boats were scrapped between 1990 and 1994.

Charlie I class — significant dates
#	Shipyard	Laid down	Launched	Commissioned	Fleet	Status
K-43 leased to India as Chakra	Krasnoye Sormovo, Gorkiy	May 9, 1964	August 2, 1966	November 5, 1967	to Pacific (1980)	Decommissioned July 30, 1992 for scrapping
K-87 from January 15, 1978 K-212	Krasnoye Sormovo, Gorkiy	February 6, 1965	March 20, 1968	December 28, 1968	to Pacific (1978)	Decommissioned April 19, 1990 for scrapping
K-25	Krasnoye Sormovo, Gorkiy	December 2, 1965	July 31, 1968	December 30, 1968	Northern	Decommissioned June 24, 1991 for scrapping
K-121	Krasnoye Sormovo, Gorkiy	November 25, 1966	April 29, 1969	October 31, 1969	to Pacific (1983)	Decommissioned June 30, 1992 for scrapping
K-313	Krasnoye Sormovo, Gorkiy	July 14, 1966	July 16, 1969	December 16, 1969	to Pacific (1986)	Decommissioned April 19, 1990 for scrapping
K-308	Krasnoye Sormovo, Gorkiy	December 29, 1967	February 19, 1970	September 20, 1970	to Pacific (1985)	Decommissioned July 30, 1992 for scrapping
K-320	Krasnoye Sormovo, Gorkiy	April 30, 1968	March 27, 1971	September 15, 1971	to Pacific (1979)	Decommissioned April 19, 1990 for scrapping
K-302	Krasnoye Sormovo, Gorkiy	January 17, 1969	July 11, 1970	December 1, 1970	to Pacific (1988)	Decommissioned June 30, 1992 for scrapping
K-325	Krasnoye Sormovo, Gorkiy	September 6, 1969	June 4, 1971	November 5, 1971	to Pacific (1978)	Decommissioned June 24, 1991 for scrapping
K-429	Krasnoye Sormovo, Gorkiy	January 26, 1971	April 22, 1972	September 15, 1972	to Pacific (1977)	Decommissioned 1987 for scrapping
K-201	Krasnoye Sormovo, Gorkiy	November 16, 1971	September 1972	December 26, 1972	to Pacific (1974)	Decommissioned April 19, 1990 for scrapping

Charlie II class — significant dates
#	Shipyard	Laid down	Launched	Commissioned	Fleet	Status
K-458	Krasnoye Sormovo, Gorkiy	February 12, 1974	June 30, 1975	December 29, 1975	Northern	Decommissioned June 24, 1991 for scrapping
K-452	Krasnoye Sormovo, Gorkiy	December 30, 1972	June 1973	December 30, 1973	Northern	Decommissioned May 30, 1998 for scrapping
K-479	Krasnoye Sormovo, Gorkiy	December 20, 1975	May 6, 1977	September 30, 1977	Northern	Decommissioned July 5, 1992 for scrapping
K-503	Krasnoye Sormovo Gorkiy	February 7, 1977	September 22, 1978	December 31, 1978	Northern	Decommissioned June 30, 1993 for scrapping
K-508	Krasnoye Sormovo Gorkiy	December 10, 1977	October 3, 1979	December 30, 1979	Northern	Decommissioned August 4, 1995 for scrapping
K-209	Krasnoye Sormovo, Gorkiy	December 20, 1979	September 16, 1980	December 30, 1980	Northern	Decommissioned 1996 for scrapping
