= VP-23 =

Patrol Squadron 23
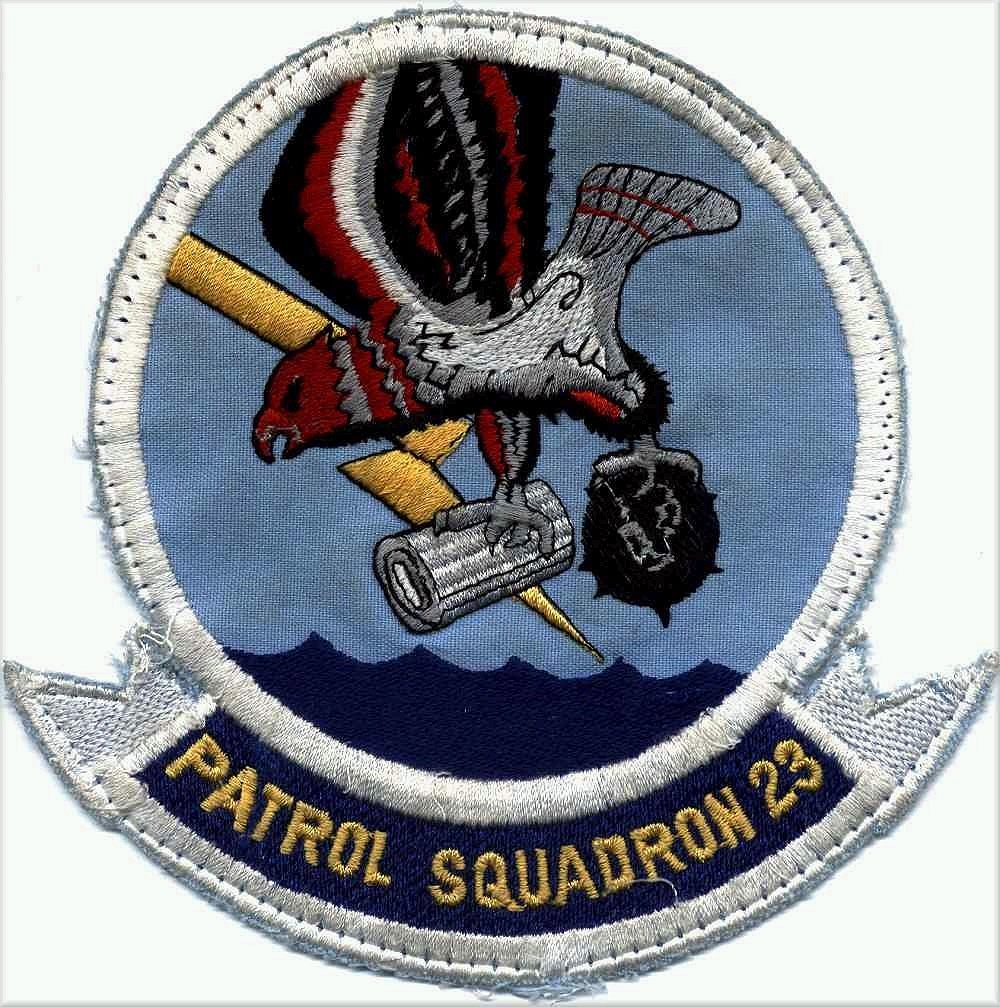
- VP-23 Patch (1953-1985)
- Active: 17 May 1946 – 28 February 1995
- Country: United States of America
- Branch: United States Navy
- Type: squadron
- Role: Maritime patrol
- Part of: Patrol Wing (PatWing) Five
- Garrison/HQ: Brunswick Naval Air Station, Brunswick, Maine
- Nickname: Seahawk
- Decorations: Navy Unit Commendation – 5 Sep 1979 to 4 Mar 1980; Meritorious Unit Commendation – 9 Sep 1970 to 31 Oct 1970; Meritorious Unit Commendation – 15 Feb 1981 to 29 Jul 1981; Meritorious Unit Commendation – 5 May 1990 to 10 Nov 1990; Navy Expeditionary Medal – 1 Oct 1976 to 30 Sep 1977; Navy Expeditionary Medal – 21 Nov 1979 to 1 Dec 1979; Armed Forces Expeditionary Medal – 23 Oct 1983 to 21 Nov 1983; Southwest Asia Service Medal – Oct 1990 to 10 Nov 1990; Joint Meritorious Unit Award – 15 Aug 1990 to 12 Oct 1990; Battle "E" (1976)

Aircraft flown
- Patrol: PB4Y-2M/2S Privateer; P-2V-5/7/7S SP-2H Neptune; P-3B/C Orion

VP-23, Patrol Squadron 23, known as the Seahawks, was a U.S. Navy fixed-wing, anti-submarine and maritime patrol squadron based at Brunswick Naval Air Station, Brunswick, Maine, United States. It was established as Weather Reconnaissance Squadron Three (VPW-3) on 17 May 1946, redesignated as Meteorology Squadron Three (VPM-3) on 15 November 1946, redesignated Heavy Patrol Squadron (Landplane) Three (VP-HL-3) on 8 December 1947 (as the second squadron to be assigned the VP-HL-3 designation), and to Patrol Squadron Twenty Three (VP-23) on 1 September 1948 and disestablished on 28 February 1995. It was the second squadron to be designated VP-23, the first VP-23 was redesignated Patrol Bombing Squadron 23 (VPB-23) on 1 October 1944 and disestablished on 25 January 1946.

== Operational history ==
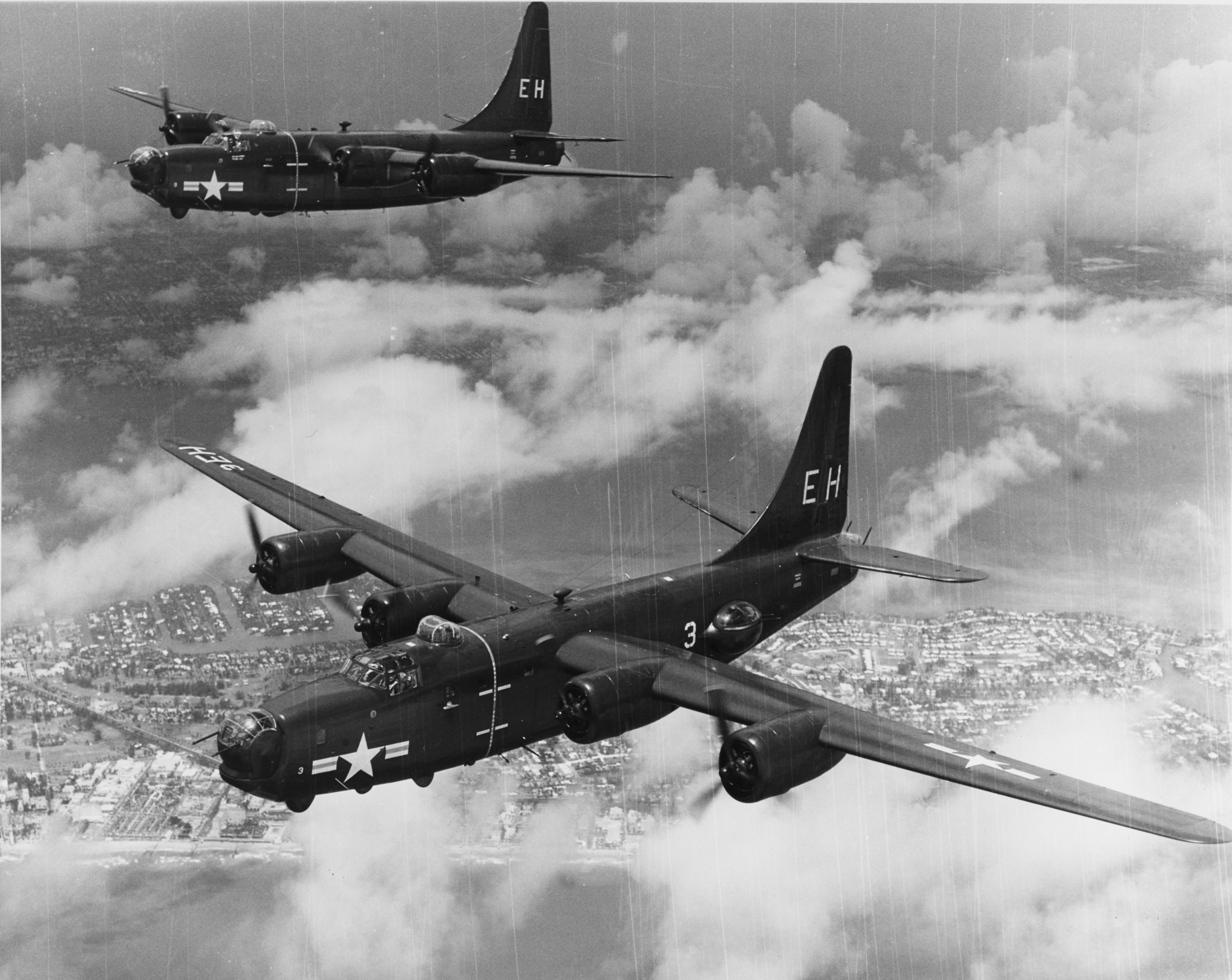
VP-23 PB4Ys over Miami in 1949

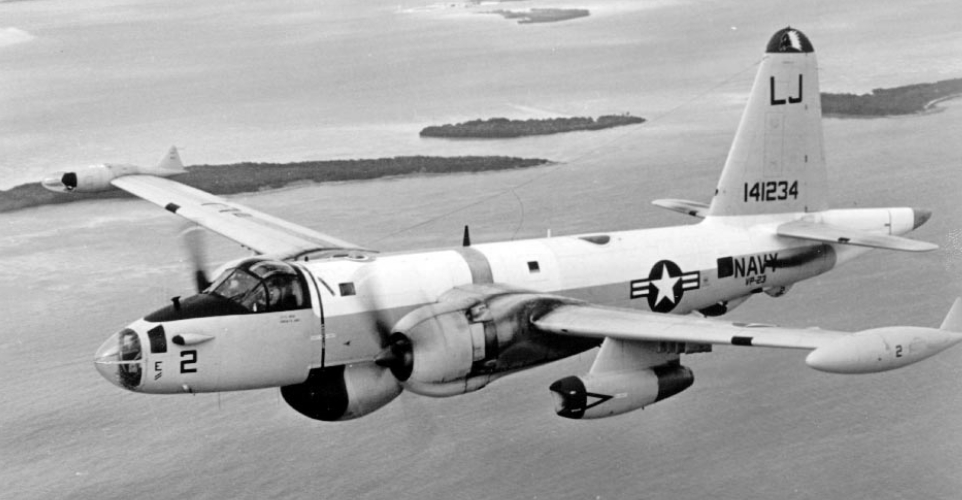
VP-23 SP-2H in the 1960s

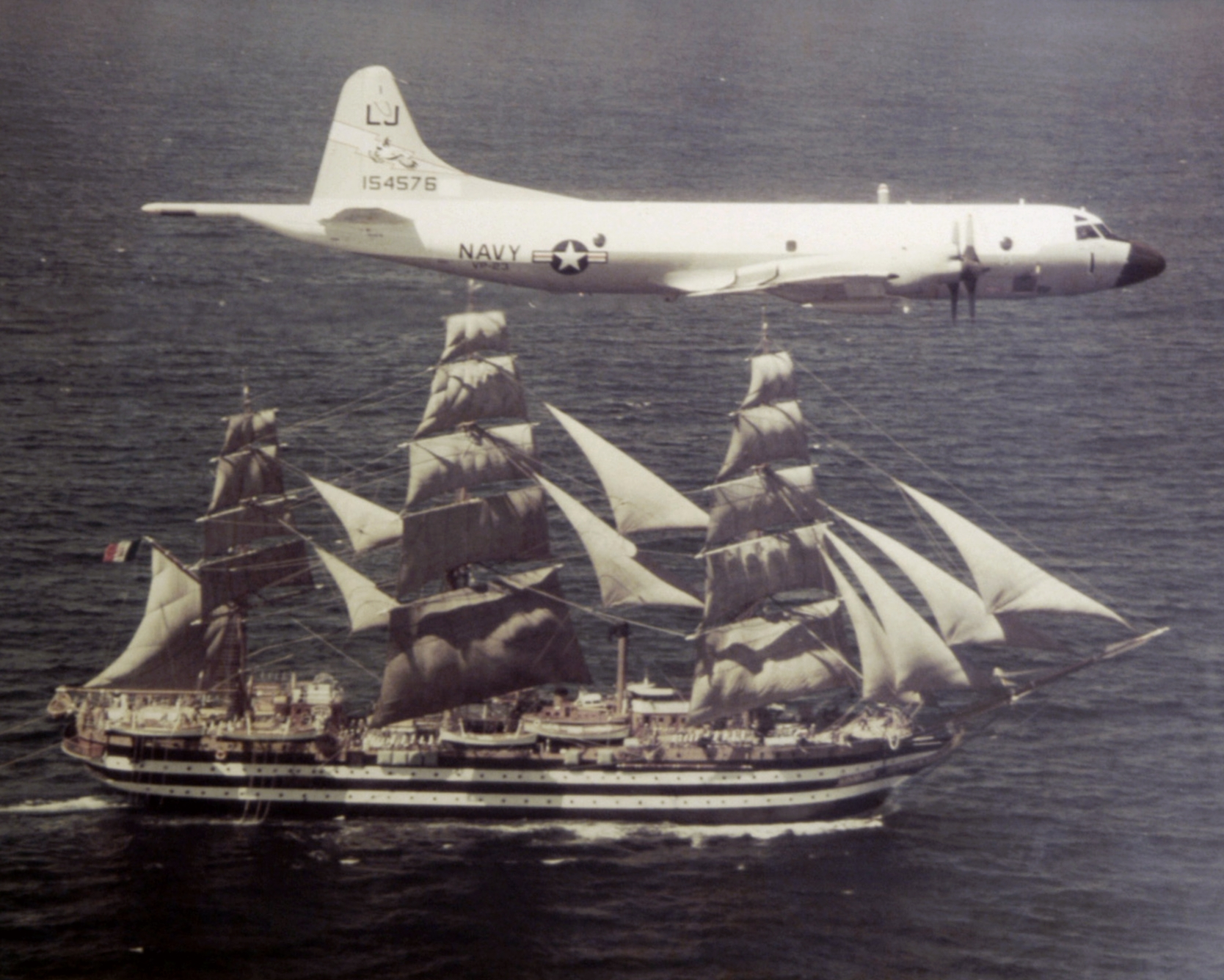
VP-23 P-3B over Italian training ship Amerigo Vespucci in 1976

- 17–21 May 1946: VPW-3 was established as a weather reconnaissance squadron under FAW-14 at NAAS Camp Kearney, California, for duty in the Caribbean. Its aircraft and personnel were drawn from VPW-2. Four days after its establishment, the new squadron departed for its assigned home base at NAS Miami, Florida, where the crews began flying the PB4Y-2M Privateer fitted with radar for weather reconnaissance. When the squadron arrived at NAS Miami it came under the operational control of FAW-5.
- 15 November 1946: VPW-3 was redesignated VPM-3, continuing to serve as a weather/meteorology squadron still based at NAS Miami.
- 8 December 1947: VPM-3 was redesignated VP-HL-3 after another squadron with that same designation had been disestablished on 22 May 1947. Although designated as a Heavy Patrol Squadron (Landplane), it continued to provide weather reconnaissance and hurricane surveillance flights for the East Coast.
- 15 January–September 1948: VP-HL-3 was relocated to a new home port at NAS Atlantic City, New Jersey, but their stay at the new station was cut short by an order on 29 March 1948 to base at NAS Patuxent River, Maryland, however, the move to Patuxent River never occurred. The squadron deployed from NAS Atlantic City on 15 April 1948 for Naval Station Argentia, Newfoundland, with a detachment at NAS Miami. The entire squadron joined the detachment at Miami at the close of the 1948 Atlantic hurricane season for the filming of the movie Slattery’s Hurricane.
- 1 January 1949: After the Navy sequences for the movie were completed at NAS Miami, preparations for the squadron's transfer to NAS Patuxent River were halted and VP-23 was permanently assigned to NAS Miami under the operational control of FAW-11.
- 1 June–11 November 1949: VP-23 broke all records for hurricane surveillance by Navy patrol squadrons, entering the "eyes" of 33 hurricanes during the 1949 Atlantic hurricane season. The squadron then ended its career in weather and converted to the Anti-submarine warfare (ASW) role effective 15 November 1949. The squadron’s aircraft were redesignated PB4Y-2S and were retrofitted with the APS-15 ASW radar.
- 4 December 1949: VP-23 began its new role as a patrol squadron, with ASW as its primary mission, and deployed to Newfoundland and Greenland for cold weather training. RON (Remain/Over Night) visits were made to remote air bases at CFB Goose Bay, Labrador and Narsarsuaq Air Base, Greenland, carrying mail. During the deployment extensive use was made of LORAN gear.
- 1 July 1950: VP-23 surveyed the Gulf Stream in Operation Cabot, in support of USS San Pablo. The squadron recorded color changes in the gulf, took APS-15 radar signatures, and noted LORAN fixes on surface and subsurface features. During the operation at least one aircraft was designated to provide weather reconnaissance for the surface vessels participating in the project.
- 9 May 1952: VP-23 was transferred from NAS Miami, to a new permanent home base at NAS Brunswick, Maine, under the operational control of FAW-3. Although the squadron was transferred, 7 officers and 109 enlisted personnel remained at NAS Miami to form VJ-2, a weather squadron that took the place of VP-23. Shortly after the transfer, the squadron was equipped with PB4Y-2 aircraft that were soon redesignated P4Y-2S, fitted with antisubmarine radar.
- 19 May 1952: VP-23 deployed to NAS Argentia for three months of advanced base training in cold weather operations, relieving VP-24. The squadron flew long-distance reconnaissance flights over the Labrador, Davis Strait and Baffin Bay. A four-aircraft detachment was maintained at Thule Air Base, Greenland.
- January 1953: VP-23 deployed to the Spanish Air Base at Reus, Tarragona, Spain, for one week of training with Spanish Air Force personnel. At the end of the week the squadron flew to Naval Air Station Port Lyautey, French Morocco. The operations in Spain represented the first formal cooperation with the Spanish armed forces since before World War II.
- June 1953: VP-23 deployed to NAS Argentia, with a detachment at Thule AFB. The detachments charted ice conditions in the surface shipping lanes between Newfoundland and Greenland, moved urgent supplies to remote bases, conducted research for the Hydrographic Office in Washington, transported personnel and dropped mail to fleet units at sea and ashore. Routine ASW patrols were also flown by the Argentia detachment.
- 7 May 1954: One of the VP-23 Neptunes, MA-5, crashed on takeoff from Nassau, Bahamas during exercises with the Atlantic Fleet, killing the entire crew.
- 29 July 1954: A squadron Neptune, MA-7, developed engine trouble during an operational readiness flight near NAS Qounset Point, Rhode Island. The crew ditched with no casualties and were pulled from the water after one and a half hours.
- April 1955: VP-23 transitioned to the jet-assisted P2V-7 Neptune. At the end of the month the squadron received operational training in the new aircraft during its deployment to NAS Bermuda. A three-aircraft detachment was maintained at Lajes Field, Azores. Exercises were conducted in ASW techniques with fleet submarines, surface units, other patrol squadrons and blimp squadrons.
- 16 July 1958: With the landing of U.S. Marines in Lebanon on 15 July, the squadron was quickly flown to Naval Air Station Keflavik, Iceland, the next day to assume station over the North Atlantic approaches. VP-23 remained at this location until early September.
- 1 January 1961: VP-23 had just deployed to NAS Argentia, when they were put on alert for the hijacked Portuguese liner Santa Maria. The search for the missing vessel took five of the squadron’s aircraft to Barbados, Trinidad and Recife, Brazil, before the liner was found. This detachment remained at San Juan until March, when it rejoined the squadron at Argentia. The remaining months of the deployment were spent in shipping surveillance and evaluation testing of the TIROS-2 weather satellite.
- 1 May 1961: The squadron established a new endurance record for the P2V-7 Neptune during their deployment to NAS Argentia, remaining in the air for 22 hours and 54 minutes. The flight was planned in honor of the 50th anniversary of Naval Aviation.
- 8 August–November 1962: VP-23 deployed to Naval Air Station Sigonella, Sicily, relieving VP-16. Detachments were maintained at Naval Base Rota, Spain; Elmas, Sardinia; and Soudha Bay, Crete. On 30 September two detachments of four aircraft each were put on standby at Ben Guerir Air Base, Morocco, and Lajes Field, for the Mercury-Atlas 8 space mission. The mission concluded successfully and the detachments returned to NAF Sigonella on 5 October. From 21 October to 21 November 1962, the squadron was put on alert during the Cuban Missile Crisis, flying round-the-clock surveillance and ASW missions in support of the Sixth Fleet. Soviet surface units were kept under surveillance during transit of the Mediterranean Sea.
- February 1963: While preparing to return from Operation Springboard exercises in Puerto Rico in late February, the squadron was tasked to locate the hijacked Venezuelan cargo vessel Anzoátegui. Searches were conducted in the South Atlantic and Caribbean before the ship was discovered by VP-23 in the mouth of the Amazon River.
- April 1963: VP-23 was tasked with the futile search for survivors or debris from the USS Thresher disaster. On 30 May a squadron aircraft dropped a wreath over the site of the sinking.
- 6 September 1963: VP-23 deployed a seven-aircraft detachment to NAS Guantanamo Bay, Cuba, relieving VP-45. Numerous patrols were conducted in support of Cuban refugees adrift at sea.
- November 1966-May 1967 VP-23 deployed to NAF Sigonella, Sicily, with a detachment deployed to Souda Bay, Crete, supported by USS Tallahatchie County.
- 3 December 1967: A squadron aircraft, LJ-4 with crew 11, crashed in adverse weather off the end of the Otis AFB runway. The crew egressed safely, but the aircraft was totally consumed by fire.
- 15 April–August 1968: VP-23 deployed to NAF Sigonella, Sicily. On 1 August, a detachment deployed to Souda Bay, Crete, supported by USS Tallahatchie County.
- 1 November 1968: The squadron had been scheduled for disestablishment on this date, but the decision was rescinded at the last moment by the Secretary of Defense.
- 27 June–August 1969: VP-23 deployed to NAF Sigonella, Sicily, relieving VP-21. During the deployment squadron aircraft made contacts on 37 Soviet Bloc submarines in the Mediterranean Sea.
- November 1969–June 1970: The squadron received its first P-3B Orion, completing transition training on 15 June 1970. VP-23 was the last remaining active duty patrol squadron to fly the SP-2H, retiring its last Neptune on 20 February 1970.
- 13 June–July 1974: VP-23 deployed to NS Rota, with a detachment maintained at NAF Lajes. Three aircraft were sent to NAF Sigonella on 20 July, during the Cyprus unrest in case the need arose to evacuate U.S. citizens. The detachment returned to Rota on 23 July.
- 23 March–April 1978: VP-23 deployed to NS Rota, with a four-aircraft/five-crew detachment maintained at Lajes. On 26 April 1978, aircraft LJ-04, BuNo. 152724, crashed at sea on landing approach to Lajes, killing seven. The cause of the accident was undetermined due to inability to recover aircraft remains from the extreme depths.
- 18 July 1979: VP-23 became the first Navy patrol squadron to fire the new Harpoon antiship missile. VP-23 was the first operational fleet patrol squadron to make an operational deployment with the Harpoon.
- 5 September 1979–January 1980: VP-23 deployed to NAF Keflavik, Iceland, for NATO exercises. A detachment was maintained at the NATO airfield at Bodø Main Air Station, Norway. With the seizure of the American embassy in Iran, a detachment of three Harpoon-equipped Orions was sent on 1 January 1980 to Diego Garcia. The squadron’s performance earned it the Navy Unit Commendation.
- 1 January 1980: VP-23 deployed from Keflavik, Iceland, to Diego Garcia and made its first operational flight out of the Indian Ocean base within 10 days after receiving orders, demonstrating its rapid deployment capability.
- 12 June–October 1983: The squadron deployed to NAS Bermuda, with detachments in Panama; Lajes, Azores; and Roosevelt Roads Naval Station, Puerto Rico. On 28 October 1983, VP-23 transported a film crew to observe Soviet submarine K-324 that had been forced to surface after developing problems with its propulsion system after snagging the towed sonar array cable of USS McCloy.
- 29 October–3 November 1983: VP-23 provided a three aircraft detachment at Puerto Rico for patrols in the vicinity of Grenada during Operation Urgent Fury, the U.S. Invasion of Grenada.
- 16 January–April 1986: VP-23 deployed to NS Rota, with a detachment at Lajes, Azores. During the period from 24 March to 15 April 1986 the Rota detachment supported the Sixth Fleet’s strikes against Libya.
- 10 May 1990: VP-23 deployed to NAS Bermuda, with a detachment at NAS Roosevelt Roads. The Puerto Rico detachment set a record when CAC-1 Combat Aircrew, Lt. Jason Lilly Mission Commander, located and tracked a Venezuelan vessel in the territorial waters of the Dominican Republic transporting a 1,400-kilo batch of cocaine, which in coordination with D.E.A. and the United States Coast Guard, led to the seizure of the vessel and confiscation of its drug cargo, a record for that year.
- 26 September–November 1990: The squadron was tasked with providing a detachment at Jeddah, Saudi Arabia to provide support for Operation Desert Shield.
- 1 November 1991: VP-23 deployed to NAS Sigonella. During the deployment a detachment was maintained at Jeddah, Saudi Arabia, in support of the UN embargo against Iraq.
- 1994: VP-23 operated from NAS Sigonella, on its last deployment. The squadron provided NATO forces in Bosnia with real-time tactical reconnaissance in support of Operation Deny Flight. The squadron’s P-3Cs, armed with AGM-65 Maverick missiles, flew more than 300 armed sorties in support of Operation Sharp Guard in the Adriatic Sea.
- 7 December 1994: The squadron held a disestablishment ceremony at NAS Brunswick.
- 28 February 1995: VP-23 was disestablished at NAS Brunswick.

== Home port assignments ==
The squadron was assigned to these home ports, effective on the dates shown:

- NAAS Camp Kearney, California - 17 May 1946
- NAS Miami, Florida - 21 May 1946
- NAS Atlantic City, New Jersey - 15 January 1948
- NAS Patuxent River, Maryland - 29 March 1948
- NAS Miami - 1 January 1949
- NAS Brunswick, Maine - 9 May 1952

== Aircraft assignment ==
The squadron first received the following aircraft on the dates shown:

- PB4Y-2M Privateer – May 1946
- PB4Y-2S Privateer - November 1949
- P4Y-2S Privateer - May 1952
- P2V-5 Neptune – October 1953
- P2V-7 Neptune - April 1955
- P2V-7S/SP-2H Neptune - 1959
- P-3B Orion – November 1969
- P-3B DIFAR Orion – March 1971
- P-3C UII Orion – October 1978

== Notable former members ==
- Michael Foreman, Mission Specialist on STS-123 and STS-129.
- Rear Admiral Jeffrey Lemmons.
- Rear Admiral Mark Skinner.

== See also ==
- History of the United States Navy
- List of inactive United States Navy aircraft squadrons
- List of United States Navy aircraft squadrons
- List of squadrons in the Dictionary of American Naval Aviation Squadrons
