= Fighter Squadron 1 (United States Navy) =

- VF-1 insignia
- Active: 14 October 1972 – 1 October 1993
- Country: United States
- Branch: United States Navy
- Type: Fighter
- Role: Air interdiction Aerial reconnaissance Close air support
- Garrison/HQ: NAS Miramar
- Nickname(s): Wolfpack; Wichita (callsign)
- Engagements: Vietnam War * Operation Frequent Wind; Tanker War * Operation Nimble Archer * Operation Earnest Will; Operation Desert Storm; Unified Task Force; Operation Southern Watch

Aircraft flown
- Fighter: F-14A Tomcat

Fighter Squadron 1 (VF-1) was a fighter squadron of the United States Navy. Originally established on 14 October 1972 it was disestablished on 30 September 1993. It was the fifth US Navy squadron to be designated VF-1. Known as the "Wolfpack" the squadron saw combat during the Vietnam War and Operation Desert Storm. The squadron was de-activated and its personnel reassigned in 1993 when its carrier, USS Ranger, was decommissioned.

== Operational history ==
VF-1, Wolfpack, was established on 14 October 1972 at NAS Miramar, at the same time as VF-2, and these units were the first operational fighter squadrons equipped with the Grumman F-14 Tomcat. VF-1 received the first F-14A's on 1 July 1973. The squadron's insignia was a red wolf's head designed by Grumman Commercial Artist, George M. Kehew, who himself is a World War II combat veteran. The squadron insignia is registered in the U.S. Library of Congress.

VF-1 was assigned to Carrier Air Wing 14 (CVW-14) aboard USS Enterprise. Their first cruise came in September 1974. The end of the cruise saw the first Tomcat's combat debut, as VF-1 and VF-2 flew cover over Saigon for the evacuation of US personnel in April 1975 as part of Operation Frequent Wind.

In July 1976, Enterprise began her eighth Western Pacific deployment. In February 1977, Idi Amin, the President of Uganda, made derogatory remarks against the United States in public and Americans in Uganda were taken hostage. This was several months after the Israeli raid at Entebbe airport. Enterprise and her escort ships were scheduled to transit home after a seven-month deployment, but having just left Mombasa after a port call, were directed to remain in the area and operate off the east African coast for about one week. The ship's Marine detachment and air wing prepared for a possible mission to rescue and evacuate the Americans, but Amin eventually released all the hostages. The flotilla then steamed across the Indian Ocean at high speed to make a previously scheduled final port call at NAS Cubi Point in the Philippines before returning to NAS Alameda.

In 1978, Enterprise underwent her ninth Western Pacific deployment, including port calls in Hong Kong, Perth, Australia, and Singapore. VF-1 left Enterprise after this deployment, when the carrier entered her mid-life conversion in January 1979.

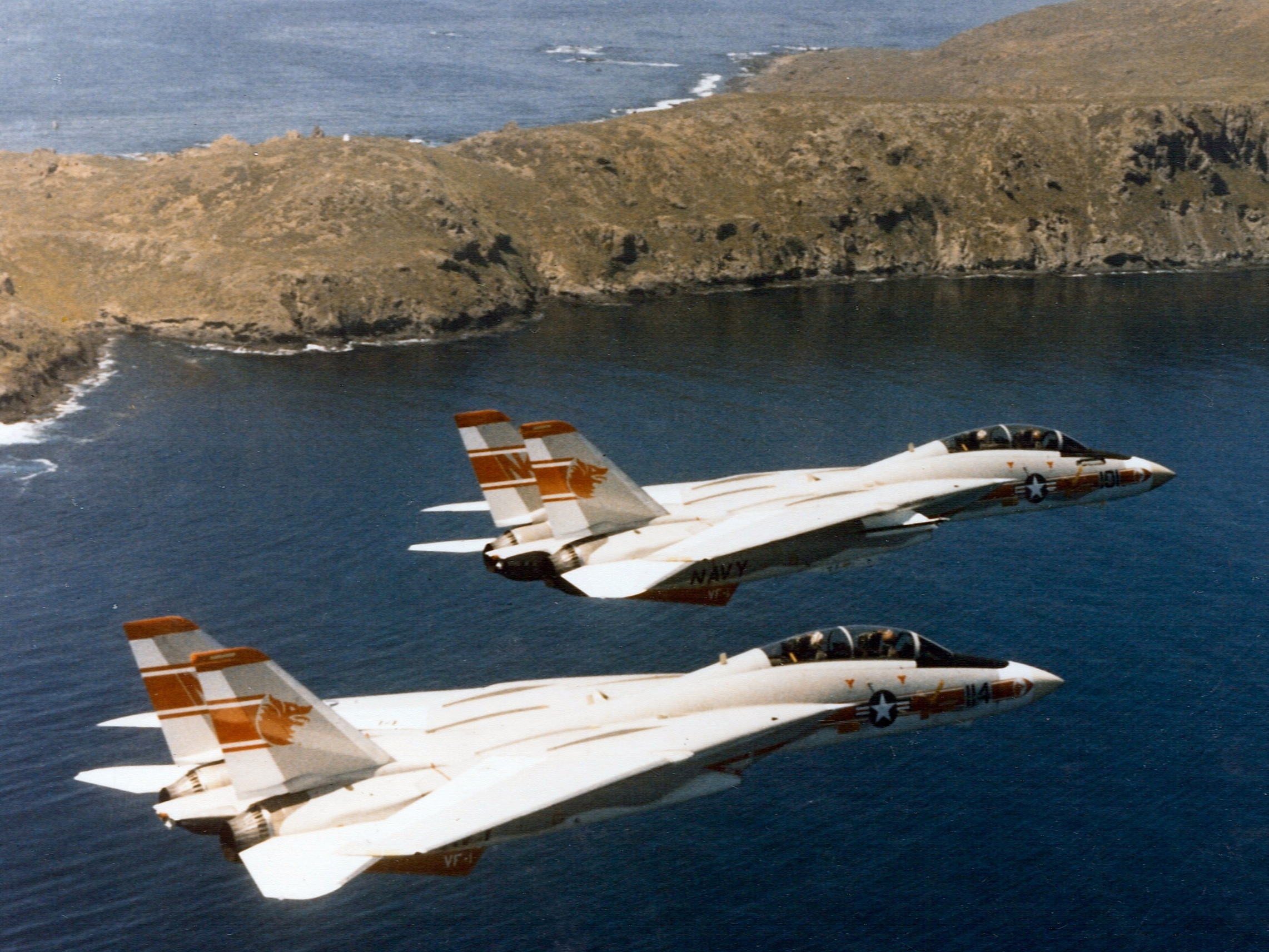
F-14A Tomcats from VF-1 in the 1970s.

In September 1980, both VF-1 and VF-2 were reassigned to CVW-2. The air wing stayed aboard USS Ranger for two deployments before being reassigned to USS Kitty Hawk for one cruise. In 1984, VF-1 had achieved the impressive 22,000 flight hours without a single accident.

In January 1982, Kitty Hawk had returned to Bremerton for another year-long overhaul. Following the comprehensive upgrade and a vigorous training period with CVW-2, Kitty Hawk deployed in 1984 as the flagship for Battle Group Bravo.

In March 1984, Kitty Hawk participated in "Team Spirit" exercises in the Sea of Japan. The Soviet Victor-class nuclear attack submarine K-314 shadowed the task group. On 21 March, at the conclusion of the Sea of Japan part of the exercise, K-314 surfaced directly in front of Kitty Hawk, and at 22:05 hrs, too dark and far too close for Kitty Hawk to see and avoid the resulting collision, the vessels came in contact, resulting in minor damage to the carrier, and significant damage to the Soviet submarine. Kitty Hawk reported to the U.S. Naval Base at Subic Bay in the Philippines for repairs. A piece of one of K-314's propellers was embedded in Kitty Hawk's bow, as were some chunks of the Soviet anechoic coating, from scraping along the side of the sub. The carrier returned to San Diego on 1 August 1984.

Following that cruise, VF-1 and CVW-2 returned to USS Ranger for her remaining five deployments. In 1987, CVW-2 was largely composed of Grumman aircraft. The "Grumman Air Wing" deployed to the Western Pacific/Indian Ocean in July 1987, flying many "Earnest Will" escort missions into the Persian Gulf. On 19 October 1987, Ranger took part in Operation Nimble Archer, an attack on two Iranian oil platforms in the Persian Gulf by US Navy forces. The attack was a response to Iran's missile attack three days earlier on MV Sea Isle City, a re-flagged Kuwaiti oil tanker at anchor off Kuwait. The action occurred during Operation Earnest Will, the effort designed to protect Kuwaiti shipping amid the Iran-Iraq War. Air cover was provided by William H. Standley, two F-14A Tomcat fighters, and an E-2C Hawkeye from Ranger.

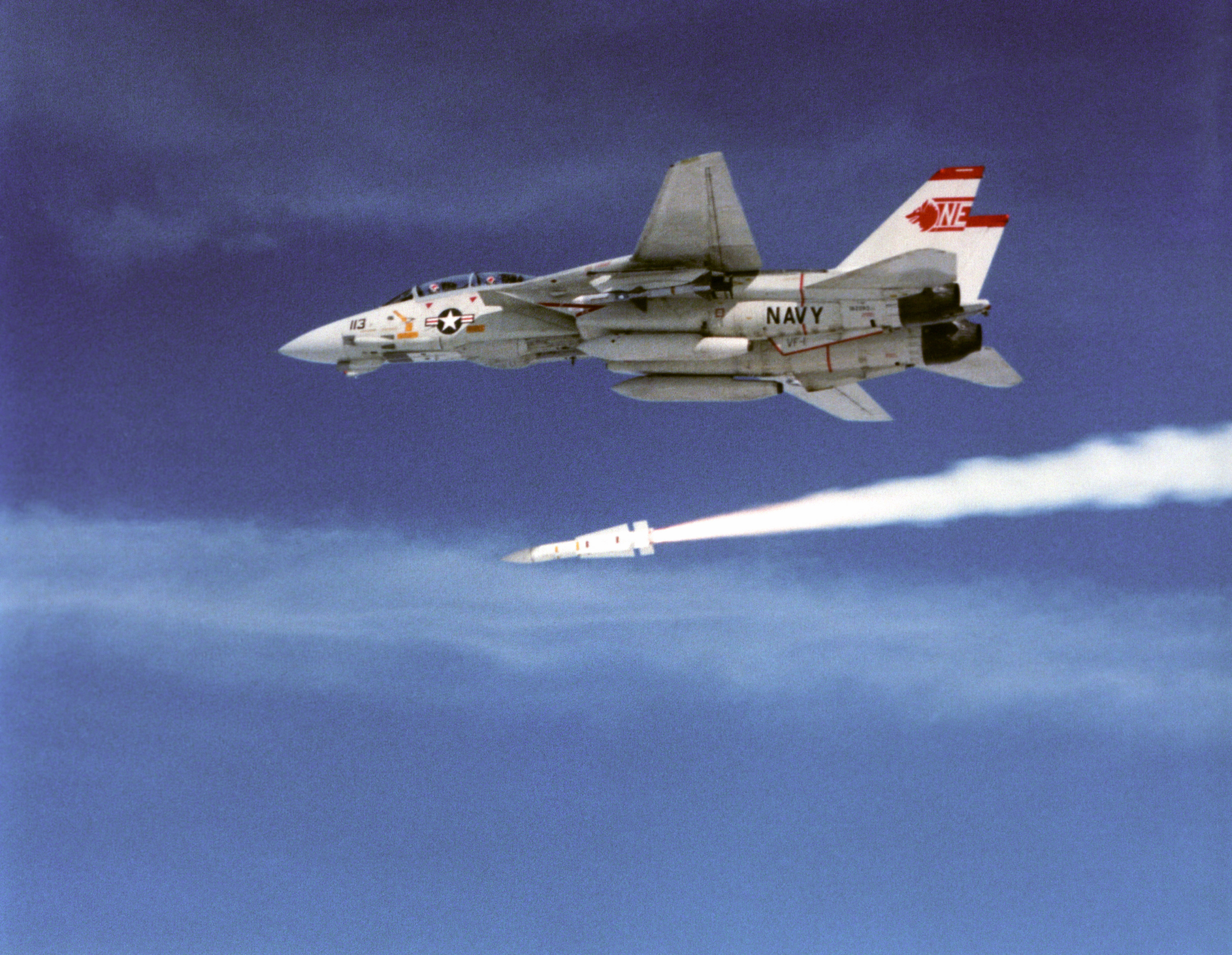
An F-14A of VF-1 launching an AIM-54 Phoenix (1989)

From February to August 1989, Ranger/CVW-2 conducted normal patrol operations in the Western Pacific/Indian Ocean.

VF-1 aboard Ranger was on station when the 1991 Gulf War began on 16 January 1991. The U.S. Navy launched 228 sorties from Ranger and Midway in the Persian Gulf, from Theodore Roosevelt en route to the Persian Gulf, and from John F. Kennedy, Saratoga, and America in the Red Sea.

On 6 February, VF-1 scored the only kill by an F-14 during the Gulf War when LT Stuart Broce, with squadron commander CDR Ron McElraft as RIO, downed an Iraqi Mi-8 Hip helicopter with an AIM-9M Sidewinder missile while flying aircraft NE-103 (BuNo 162603). At 9 pm EST on 27 February, President Bush declared Kuwait had been liberated and Operation Desert Storm would end at midnight.

On 14 January 1992, VF-1 lost aircraft NE-112 (BuNo. 160887) in a crash at Fallon, Nevada. Both aircrew members were killed in the crash.

Ranger began her 21st and final western Pacific and Indian Ocean deployment on 1 August 1992. On 18 August, she entered Yokosuka, for a six-day port visit and upkeep. Ranger entered the Persian Gulf on 14 September by transiting the Straits of Hormuz. The next day, Ranger relieved Independence in an unusual close-aboard ceremony and along with her embarked air wing, Carrier Air Wing 2, immediately began flying patrol missions in support of the United Kingdom and United States-declared "No Fly" zone in southern Iraq: Operation Southern Watch.

Ranger played a significant role in the massive relief effort for starving Somalis in Operation Restore Hope. The Ranger/CVW-2 team provided photo and visual reconnaissance, airborne air traffic control, logistics support, and on-call close air support for U.S. Navy and Marine Corps amphibious forces.

On 19 December 1992, Ranger was relieved on station by Kitty Hawk and began her last journey homeward to San Diego. Ranger's last foreign port of entry was Sydney, Australia in January 1993 after having spent New Year's Eve 1992 in Fremantle, Australia.

Ranger was decommissioned in July 1993, leaving VF-1 without a carrier. They operated out of NAS Miramar until VF-1 itself was disestablished on 1 October 1993.

== In popular culture ==
VF-1 Emblem from Top Gun

In the movie Top Gun, main characters Pete "Maverick" Mitchell (Tom Cruise) and Nick "Goose" Bradshaw (Anthony Edwards) served with a fictional version of VF-1 off USS Enterprise (CVN-65); this fictional version of VF1 had the insignia of VAW-110, which was an airborne early warning squadron operating the Northrop Grumman E-2 Hawkeye out of NAS Miramar. Aircraft of the real VF-1 squadron are also visible in the background of shots taken in Miramar.

== See also ==
- History of the United States Navy
- List of inactive United States Navy aircraft squadrons
- List of United States Navy aircraft squadrons
