= USS Drum =

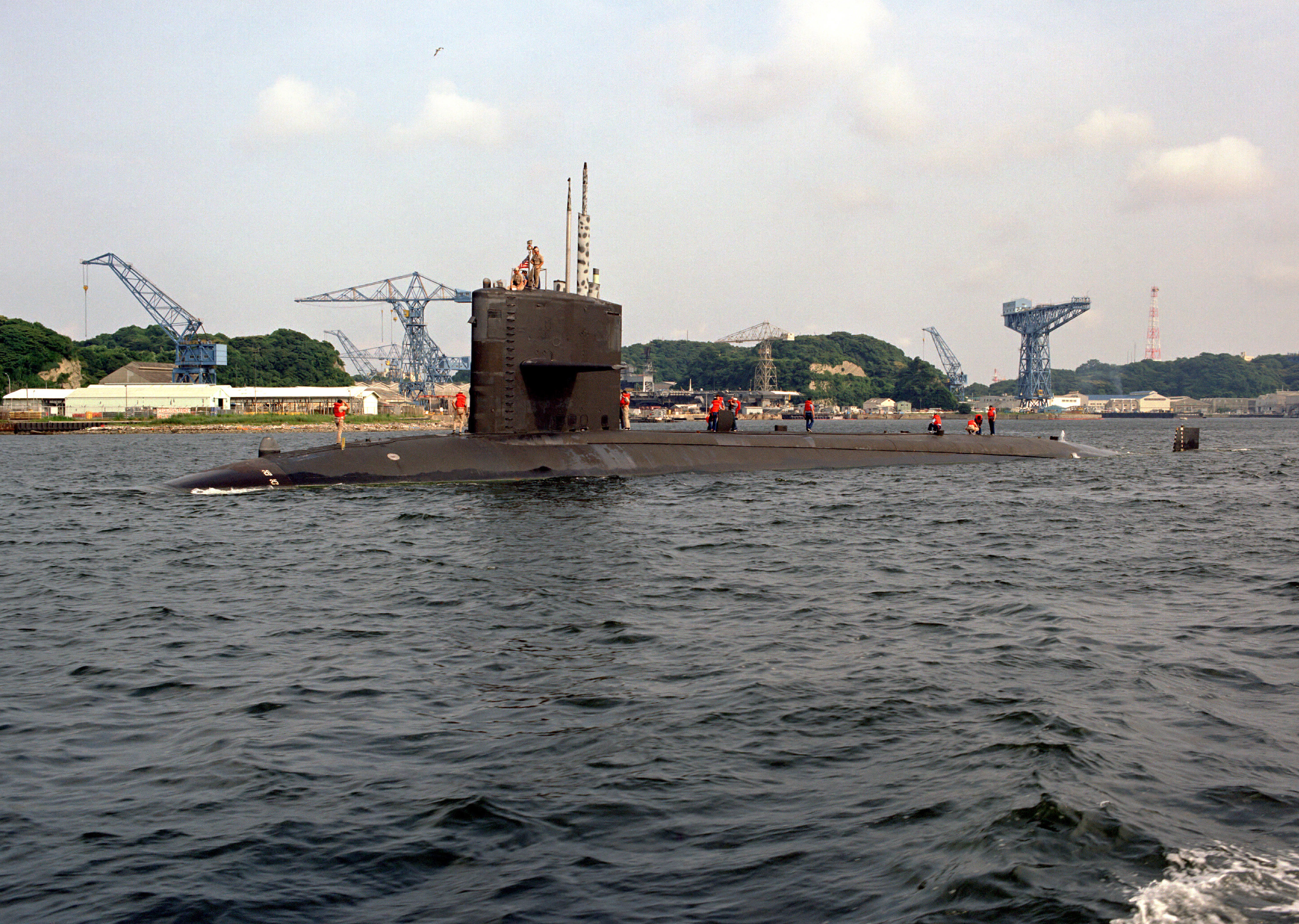
USS Drum (SSN-677)

Two submarines of the United States Navy have been named USS Drum, after the fish known as drums.

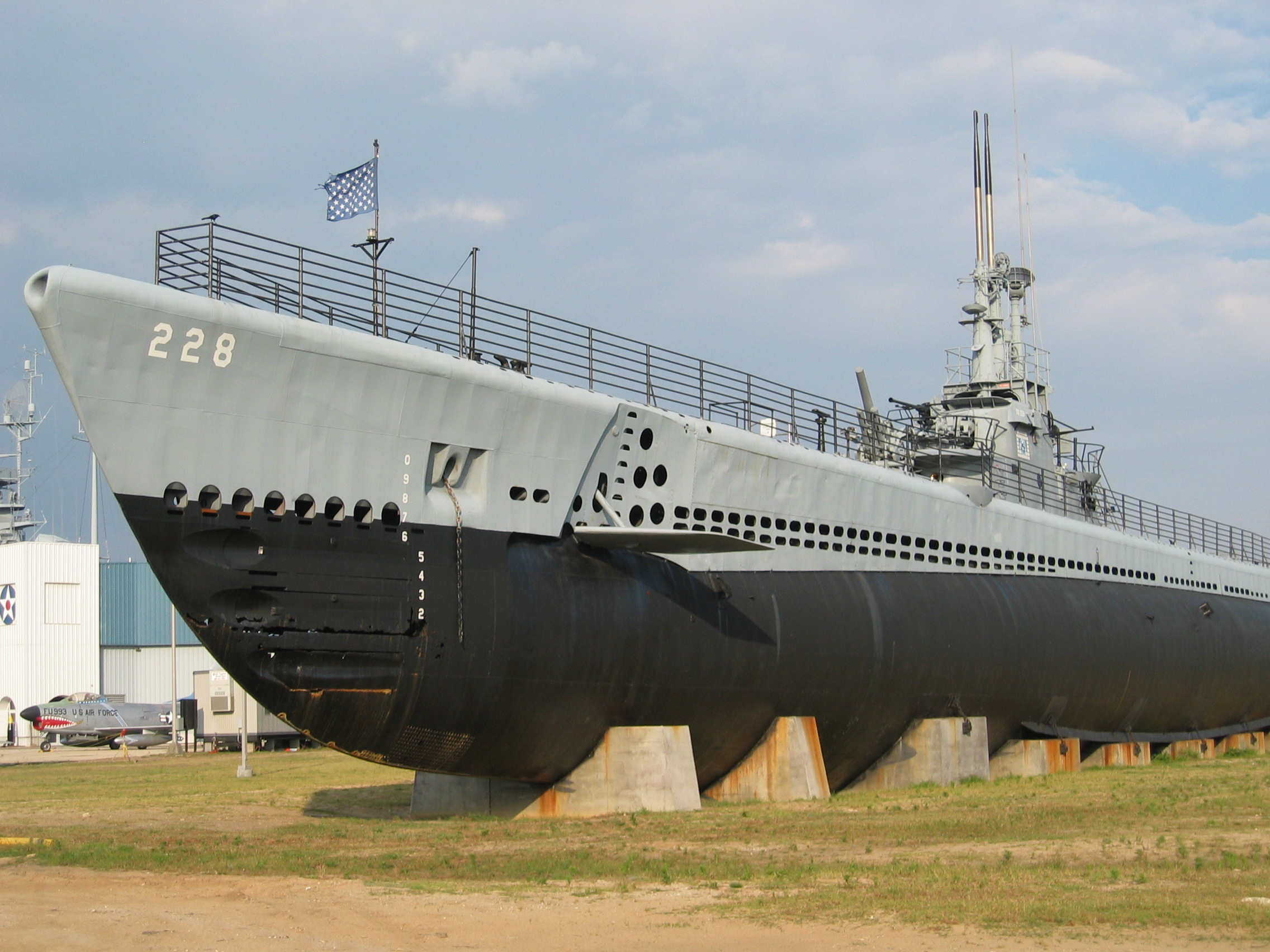
- USS Drum SS-228
  USS Drum (SS-228) is a Gato-class submarine, commissioned November 1941 and active throughout World War II.
- USS Drum (SSN-677) was a Sturgeon-class nuclear submarine in service from 1972 to 1995.
