= USS Harold E. Holt =

Knox-class frigate of the U.S. Navy

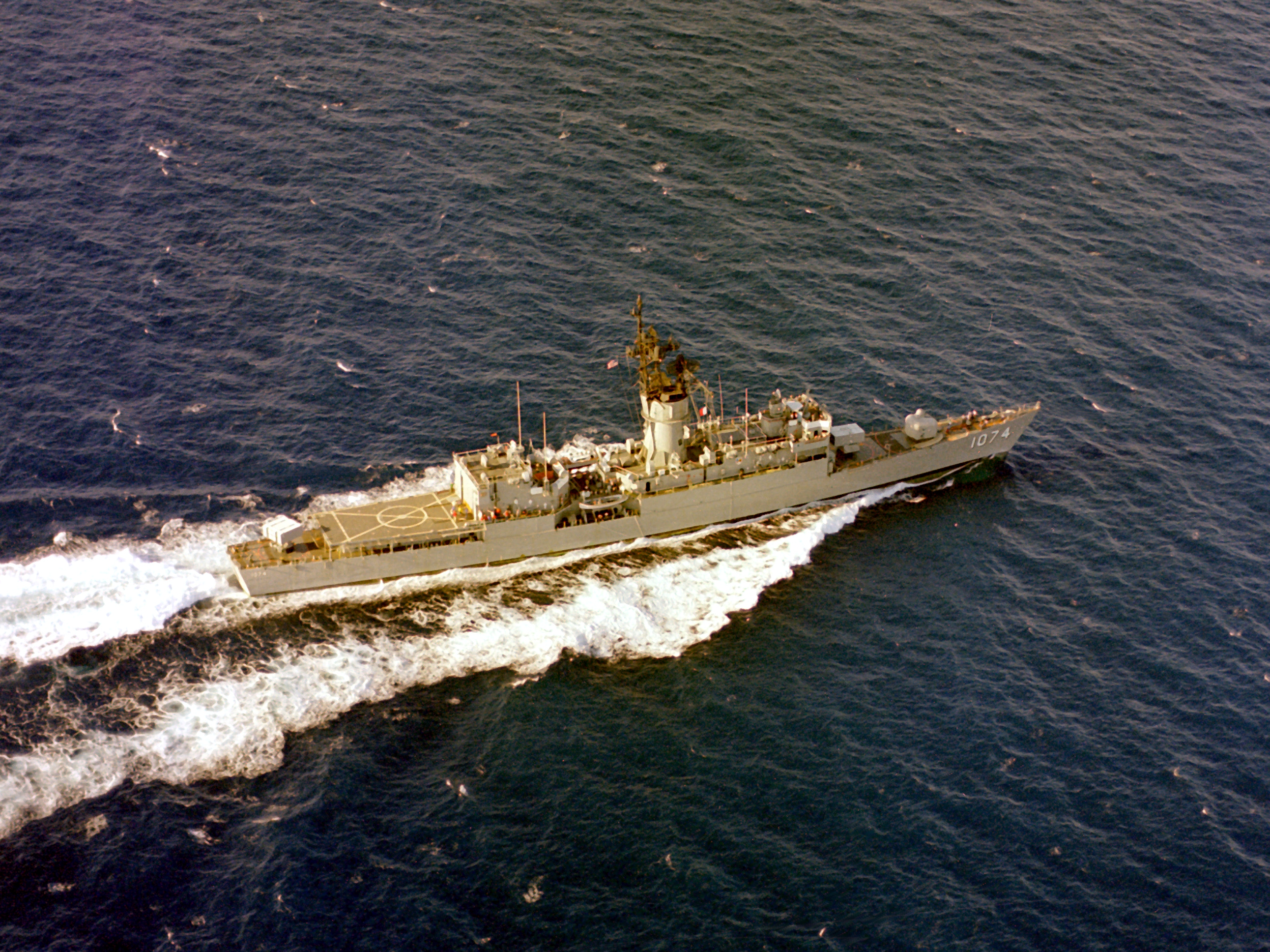
- USS Harold E. Holt (FF-1074) underway

History

United States
- Name: Harold E. Holt
- Namesake: Australian Prime Minister Harold Holt
- Ordered: 22 July 1964
- Builder: Todd Shipyards, Los Angeles Division, San Pedro, California, U.S.
- Laid down: 11 May 1968
- Launched: 3 May 1969
- Commissioned: 26 March 1971
- Decommissioned: 2 July 1992
- Stricken: 11 January 1995
- Identification: FF-1074
- Fate: Disposed of in support of Fleet training exercise, RIMPAC 2002, 10 July 2002

General characteristics
- Class & type: Knox-class frigate
- Displacement: 3,225 long tons (3,277 t) (4,218 long tons (4,286 t) full load)
- Length: 438 ft (134 m)
- Beam: 46 ft 9 in (14.25 m)
- Draft: 24 ft 9 in (7.54 m)
- Propulsion: 2 × CE 1,200 psi (8.3 MPa) boilers; 1 Westinghouse geared turbine; 1 shaft, 35,000 shp (26 MW)
- Speed: over 27 knots (31 mph; 50 km/h)
- Range: 4,500 nautical miles (8,330 km) at 20 knots (23 mph; 37 km/h)
- Complement: 18 officers, 267 enlisted
- Sensors & processing systems: AN/SPS-40 Air Search Radar; AN/SPS-67 Surface Search Radar; AN/SQS-26 Sonar; AN/SQS-35 Towed array sonar system; Mk68 Gun Fire Control System
- Electronic warfare & decoys: AN/SLQ-32 Electronics Warfare System
- Armament: one Mk-16 8 cell missile launcher for RUR-5 ASROC and Harpoon missiles; one Mk-42 5-inch/54 caliber gun; Mark 46 torpedoes from four single tube launchers); one Mk-25 BPDMS launcher for Sea Sparrow missiles
- Aircraft carried: one SH-2 Seasprite (LAMPS I) helicopter

USS Harold E. Holt (FF-1074) was a Knox-class frigate of the United States Navy. She was named for Harold Holt, the Prime Minister of Australia, who had disappeared while swimming in December 1967. The ex-Harold E. Holt hulk was sunk as a target during RIMPAC 2002.

== Design and description ==
The Knox class design was derived from the Brooke-class frigate modified to extend range and without a long-range missile system. The ships had an overall length of 438 feet (133.5 m), a beam of 47 feet (14.3 m) and a draft of 25 feet (7.6 m). They displaced 4,066 long tons (4,131 t) at full load. Their crew consisted of 13 officers and 211 enlisted men.

The ships were equipped with one Westinghouse geared steam turbine that drove the single propeller shaft. The turbine was designed to produce 35,000 shaft horsepower (26,000 kW), using steam provided by 2 C-E boilers, to reach the designed speed of 27 knots (50 km/h; 31 mph). The Knox class had a range of 4,500 nautical miles (8,300 km; 5,200 mi) at a speed of 20 knots (37 km/h; 23 mph).

The Knox-class ships were armed with a 5"/54 caliber Mark 42 gun forward. They mounted an eight-round ASROC launcher between the 5-inch (127 mm) gun and the bridge. Close-range anti-submarine defense was provided by two twin 12.75-inch (324 mm) Mk 32 torpedo tubes. The ships were equipped with a torpedo-carrying DASH drone helicopter; its telescoping hangar and landing pad were positioned amidships aft of the mack. Beginning in the 1970s, the DASH was replaced by a SH-2 Seasprite LAMPS I helicopter and the hangar and landing deck were accordingly enlarged. Most ships also had the 3-inch (76 mm) gun replaced by an eight-cell BPDMS missile launcher in the early 1970s.

== Construction and career ==
Harold E. Holt was built by Todd Shipyards, Los Angeles Division, San Pedro, California. Laid down on 11 May 1968, she was launched on 3 May 1969 delivered on 19 March 1971 and commissioned 26 March 1971.

Although not scheduled for deployment so soon after commissioning, Harold E. Holt was sent to the Gulf of Tonkin on short notice soon after the North Vietnamese Easter Offensive began in the spring of 1972. During deployment, she served as PIRAZ escort and provided gunfire support near Quang Tri. She came under fire a number of times from shore batteries and sustained one mine hit with minor damage. She returned to Long Beach in late November 1972, and was later awarded a Meritorious Unit Commendation for this deployment.

In May 1975, Harold E. Holt was involved in the Mayaguez incident. During the recapture of the container ship Mayaguez, Marines crossing from Harold E. Holt conducted the first hostile ship-to-ship boarding by the U.S. Navy since 1826.

On 21 March 1984, the Victor-class submarine K-314 collided with the aircraft carrier USS Kitty Hawk in the Sea of Japan. Kitty Hawk was not significantly damaged but the Soviet submarine could not get underway to proceed home for repairs under her own power. Harold E. Holt stayed on scene for several days before the Soviets could send out a seagoing tug to bring her home. Harold E. Holt offered assistance several times after daybreak but was refused by K-314's captain.

Harold E. Holt was decommissioned 2 July 1992 and struck 11 January 1995. On 10 July 2002, she was sunk as a target ship as part of the RIMPAC training exercises.
