= Russian submarine Daniil Moskovsky =

History

Soviet Union, Russia
- Name: B-414 Daniil Moskovsky
- Namesake: Daniil Moskovsky
- Commissioned: November 1988
- Decommissioned: 28 October 2022
- Status: Reportedly towed for scrapping, November 2022

General characteristics
- Class & type: Victor III-class submarine
- Displacement: 4,950 tons light surfaced; 6,990 tons normal surfaced; 7,250 tons submerged
- Length: 93–102 m (305 ft 1 in – 334 ft 8 in)
- Beam: 10 m (32 ft 10 in)
- Draft: 7 m (23 ft 0 in)
- Installed power: 1 × VM-4P pressurized-water twin nuclear reactor (2x75 MW); 31,000 shp (23,000 kW)
- Propulsion: 2 sets OK-300 steam turbines; 1 × 7-bladed or 2 × 4-bladed propellers; 2 low-speed electric cruise motors; 2 × propellers on stern planes
- Speed: 32 knots (59 km/h; 37 mph)
- Endurance: 80 days
- Complement: About 100 (27 officers, 34 warrant officers, 35 enlisted)
- Sensors & processing systems: Radar: 1 MRK-50 Albatros’-series (Snoop Tray-2) navigation/search; Sonar: MGK-503 Skat-KS (Shark Gill) suite: LF active/passive; passive flank array; Barrakuda towed passive linear; array (Victor III only); MT-70 active ice avoidance; EW: MRP-10 Zaliv-P/Buleva (Brick Pulp) intercept; Park Lamp direction-finder
- Armament: 4 bow torpedo tubes, 533 mm (21 in) (16 weapons - Type 83RN/Type 53-65K/USET-80 torpedoes, Type 84RN/SS-N-15 Starfish cruise missiles, VA-111 Shkval rocket torpedoes, MG-74 Korund and Siren decoys, or up to 36 naval mines)

B-414 Daniil Moskovsky was a Project 671RTM Shchuka (NATO: Victor III) attack submarine of the Russian Northern Fleet. The submarine was laid down in 1989, launched and commissioned in 1990. It was known as K-414 before renaming in 1992. In 1994 B-414 took part in joint combat service with SSBN Karelia (K-18) of the Delta IV class. In 1996 the submarine was named after Prince Daniil Moskovsky, the youngest son of Alexander Nevsky.

On 6 September 2006, a fire broke out on board killing two sailors.

On 18 November 2012, while reportedly engaged in routine "combat training" in the Barents Sea the submarine responded to a distress call and rescued two fisherman when their boat began sinking off the coast of the Kola Peninsula, reported to be somewhere between Liinakhamari and Teriberka. A spokesperson for the Russian Navy's Northern Fleet said the rescue was accomplished despite adverse weather conditions.

In 2019 it was reported that the Daniil Moskovsky would be retired by the end of 2021. However, the boat's status remained unclear as of January 2022. It was shown at dockside during a Combat Approved documentary in January 2022. The boat was reportedly decommissioned on 28 October 2022 and subsequently towed for scrapping.
