= Soviet submarine K-314 =

Soviet Victor-class nuclear submarine launched 1972

History

Soviet Union
- Name: K-314
- Laid down: 5 September 1970
- Launched: 28 March 1972
- Completed: 6 November 1972

General characteristics
- Class & type: Victor-class submarine
- Displacement: 3,500 long tons (3,556 t) surfaced; 4,750 long tons (4,826 t) submerged
- Length: 94.3 m (309 ft 5 in)
- Beam: 10 m (32 ft 10 in)
- Draft: 7.3 m (23 ft 11 in)
- Propulsion: 1 × OK-300 pressurised water reactor with a VM-4 reactor core generating 75 MWt (31,000 hp)
- Speed: 24 knots (44 km/h; 28 mph)
- Test depth: 350 m (1,150 ft)
- Complement: 94 officers and men

K-314 was a nuclear submarine of the Soviet Navy, of the type Project 671 "Ёрш" (Yorsh, meaning ruffe; also known by its NATO reporting name of Victor I class).

On 21 March 1984, K-314 collided with the aircraft carrier USS Kitty Hawk in the Sea of Japan. Kitty Hawk was not significantly damaged but the Soviet submarine could not get underway to proceed home for repairs under her own power. The Frigate USS Harold E. Holt, stayed on scene for several days before the Soviets could send out a seagoing tug to bring her home. Holt offered assistance several times after daybreak but was refused by K-314's captain.

The initial collision rolled K-314 onto her back, sparing the sail, periscope and antennas. A second strike broke loose a blade of her propeller which remained lodged in Kitty Hawk's hull. Divers reportedly removed a piece as a souvenir and samples of the submarine's hull coating were examined for intelligence purposes.
