= John McCloy (Medal of Honor) =

United States Navy Medal of Honor recipient

John Joseph McCloy I
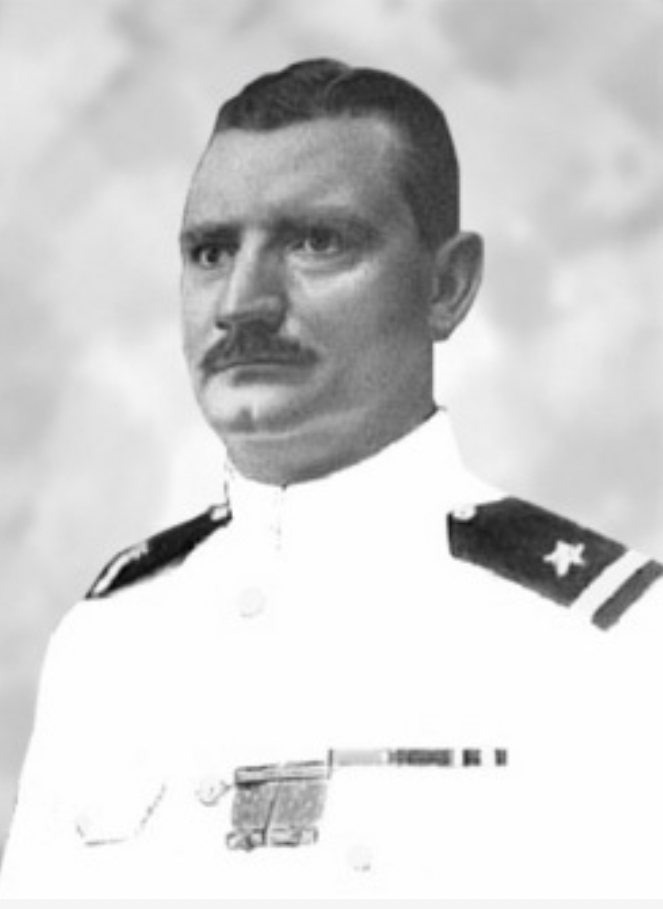
- McCloy in 1915
- Born: January 3, 1876; Brewster, New York, US
- Died: May 24, 1945 (aged 69); Leonia, New Jersey, US
- Burial place: Arlington National Cemetery
- Spouse: Sarah Frances
- Children: John II
- Military career
- Allegiance: United States of America
- Branch: United States Navy
- Service years: 1898–1928
- Rank: Lieutenant commander
- Unit: USS Newark
- Commands: USS Curlew
- Conflicts: Spanish–American War; Boxer Rebellion; Seymour Expedition; Occupation of Vera Cruz (1914)
- Awards: Medal of Honor (2); Navy Cross

Lieutenant Commander John McCloy, USN (January 3, 1876 – May 24, 1945) was an officer in the United States Navy who was one of only 19 individuals to receive the Medal of Honor twice. He received his first Medal of Honor for action in the Boxer Rebellion in June 1900. His second Medal of Honor came in 1915 for action in Vera Cruz, Mexico, in April 1914.

== Biography ==
John J. McCloy was born on January 3, 1876, in Brewster, NY to James McCloy and Sophia Beatty. John McCloy joined the Merchant Marine when he was 15 and enlisted in the United States Navy on March 7, 1898. He served on the cruiser USS Columbia in the West Indies during the Spanish–American War.

McCloy was then posted to the cruiser USS Newark (C-1) which served in the Philippines in 1900 and then participated in the China Relief Expedition during the Boxer Rebellion. He received his first Medal of Honor "for distinguished conduct in the presence of the enemy in battles of the 13th, 20th, 21st, and 22nd of June 1900, while with the relief expedition of the Allied Forces in China."

McCloy married Sarah Frances on August 17, 1905. They had one child together, John II, in 1909.

He was warranted as a boatswain on July 30, 1903, and was promoted to chief boatswain on July 30, 1909. His second Medal of Honor was awarded to him "for distinguished conduct in battle and extraordinary heroism; engagement of Vera Cruz, April 22, 1914." Following the United States' entry into World War I, he was commissioned an ensign on July 1, 1917. He was promoted to temporary lieutenant on July 1, 1918.

Immediately after World War I, McCloy served as the first commander of the minesweeper USS Curlew (AM-8) from January 1919 to November 1920. The most significant service of the Curlew during McCloy's command was clearing the mines of the North Sea mine barrage. For this work McCloy was decorated with the Navy Cross. He was permanently promoted to lieutenant on August 3, 1920.

McCloy served as the National Commander of the Legion of Valor from 1922 to 1923. In November 1923 he was assigned to command the minesweeper USS Lark (AM-23), based in Gloucester, Massachusetts, and he was later transferred to the destroyer tender USS Dobbin (AD-3). He retired from active duty as a lieutenant on October 15, 1928, and was promoted in retirement to lieutenant commander on February 23, 1942.

McCloy was a companion of the Naval Order of the United States and was active in both the Veterans of Foreign Wars and the American Legion. He was a founding member of American Legion Post No. 1 in Leonia, New Jersey, the first American Legion post in the state. He was also a member of the Military Order of the Dragon.

McCloy died of an apparent heart attack on May 25, 1945, in his home in Leonia, and was buried in Arlington National Cemetery.

== Awards ==
- Medal of Honor (2 awards)
- Navy Cross
- Sampson Medal
- Spanish Campaign Medal
- Philippine Campaign Medal
- China Relief Expedition Medal
- Mexican Service Medal
- World War I Victory Medal
- Conspicuous Service Cross (New York)

=== Medal of Honor citations ===
==== 1st Award, Boxer Rebellion ====
Rank and organization: Coxswain, U.S. Navy. Born: January 3, 1876, Brewsters, N.Y. Accredited to: New York. G.O. No.: 55, July 19, 1901. Other Navy award: Second Medal of Honor.

Citation:

In action with the relief expedition of the Allied forces in China, 13, 20, 21, and 22 June 1900. During this period and in the presence of the enemy, Coxswain McCloy distinguished himself by meritorious conduct.

==== 2nd Award, Vera Cruz, Mexico ====
Rank and organization: Chief Boatswain, U.S. Navy. Born: January 3, 1876, Brewster, N.Y. Accredited to: New York. G.O. No.: 177, December 4, 1915. Other Navy awards: Second Medal of Honor, Navy Cross.

On 21 April 1914, at the United States occupation of Veracruz, under orders from Captain William R. Rush, three steam launches led by McCloy sailed from Pier 4 along the waterfront; passing the Fiscal Warf, they veered inshore, bearing towards the Naval Academy, fired a volley to the academy from their small one-inch guns at their bows, and hastily returned, under heavy fire. Having thus revealed their positions, the academy's guns were put out of commission by the shooting accuracy of the 3-inch guns from the USS Prairie.

Citation:

For heroism in leading 3 picket launches along Vera Cruz sea front, drawing Mexican fire and enabling cruisers to save our men on shore, April 22 (sic), 1914. Though wounded, he gallantly remained at his post.

A more detailed account:

For distinguished conduct in battle and extraordinary heroism, engagement of Vera Cruz, April 22 (sic: April 21 and 22), 1914:

On April 21, Chief Boatswain McCloy was in charge of three picket boats unloading men and supplies at a pier when his detachment came under fire from the nearby Mexican Naval Academy. To expose enemy positions, he took his boat [sic: three boats] away from the pier and directed fire at the building. His action drew retaliatory fire that allowed cruisers to locate and shell sniper positions, thus protecting the men on shore. McCloy was shot in the thigh but remained at his post for 48 hours (sic) until the brigade surgeon sent him to a hospital ship. His medal citation credited him with "distinguished conduct in battle and extraordinary heroism."

=== Navy Cross citation ===
The President of the United States of America takes pleasure in presenting the Navy Cross to Lieutenant John McCloy, United States Navy, for exceptionally meritorious and distinguished service while in command of the U.S.S. Curlew, engaged in the important and hazardous work of clearing the North Sea of mines.

== Namesake ==
- USS McCloy (DE-1038) a Bronstein-class Destroyer Escort, which was later changed to FF-1038 and reclassified as a frigate, was named in his honor.

== Honors ==
The USPS issued a series of stamps, Distinguished Sailors, to their 2010 stamp collection with McCloy as one of the four famous American sailors of the 20th Century.

== See also ==
- Adventurers' Club of New York
- List of Medal of Honor recipients (Veracruz)
- List of members of the American Legion
