= USS Curlew (AM-8) =

Minesweeper of the United States Navy

Coordinates: 9.116°N 77.875°W

History

United States
- Name: USS Curlew
- Builder: Staten Island Shipbuilding Company, New York
- Laid down: 1 April 1918
- Launched: 29 August 1918
- Commissioned: 7 January 1919, as Minesweeper No.8
- Decommissioned: 28 February 1926
- Reclassified: AM-8, 17 July 1920
- Fate: Grounded on the rocks at Point Mosquito, Panama, 15 December 1925

General characteristics
- Class & type: Lapwing-class minesweeper
- Displacement: 950 long tons (970 t)
- Length: 187 ft 10 in (57.25 m)
- Beam: 35 ft 6 in (10.82 m)
- Draft: 9 ft 10 in (3.00 m)
- Speed: 14 kn (16 mph; 26 km/h)
- Complement: 72
- Armament: 2 × 3 in (76 mm) guns

USS Curlew (AM-8) was a Lapwing-class minesweeper acquired by the United States Navy for the dangerous task of removing mines, from minefields laid in the water to prevent ships from passing.

Curlew was launched on 29 August 1918 by Staten Island Shipbuilding Company, New York; sponsored by Mrs. G. C. Rhodes; and commissioned on 7 January 1919, Lieutenant John McCloy, a two time Medal of Honor recipient, in command.

== History ==
=== North Atlantic operations ===
Clearing Boston, Massachusetts on 5 April 1919, Curlew arrived at Inverness, Scotland on 20 April and was fitted out for experimental minesweeping out of Kirkwall, the Orkney Islands base for operations in the North Sea minefields. She sailed for home on 2 October, calling at Chatham, England; Brest, France; Lisbon, Portugal; the Azores; and Bermuda, and reaching New York on 19 November. Arriving at Portsmouth Naval Shipyard on 26 November, she was placed in ordinary on 16 November 1920 without a crew.

=== East Coast operations ===
In commission from 29 December 1920 – 7 February 1921, Curlew served with the Atlantic Fleet, then returned to reserve at Portsmouth. Recommissioned on 29 October, she cruised to Guantánamo Bay, Cuba, in the first four months of 1922 to give support to the ships training there, then sailed north to New London to serve as submarine tender until September. From September 1922 – February 1923, she operated with submarines in Chesapeake Bay and off the Virginia coast.

Reassigned to the 15th Naval District, Curlew reported at Coco Solo, Panama Canal Zone on 6 August. Besides acting as a tender for seaplanes, she carried out rescue and salvage operations from Coco Solo.

=== Fate ===
On 15 December 1925, Curlew was grounded on the rocks at Point Mosquitos, Panama. Determined efforts were made to save her, but the fact is that the heavy surf broke her to pieces. Curlew was decommissioned on 28 February 1926, after all salvageable material was removed.
