= Soviet submarine K-324 =

Victor III-class submarine of the Russian Navy and the Soviet Navy

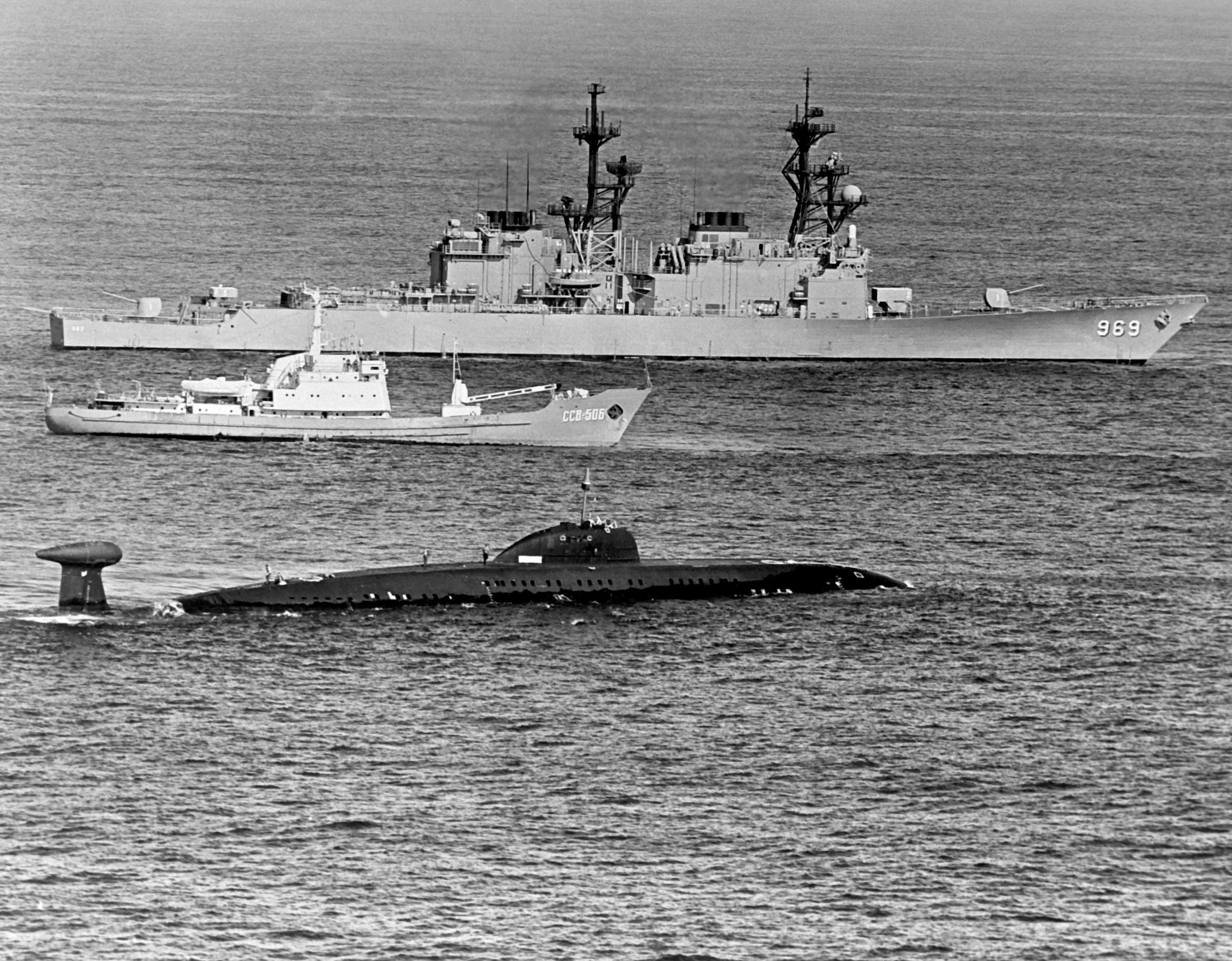
- K-324 disabled after hitting McCloy's towed array

History

→ Soviet Union → Russia
- Name: K-324
- Builder: Komsomolsk Shipyard, Komsomolsk-on-Amur
- Laid down: 1979
- Decommissioned: 2000
- Fate: Scrapped in 2005

General characteristics
- Class & type: Victor III-class submarine
- Displacement: 4,950 tons light surfaced; 6,990 tons normal surfaced; 7,250 tons submerged
- Length: 93–102 m (305 ft 1 in – 334 ft 8 in)
- Beam: 10 m (32 ft 10 in)
- Draft: 7 m (23 ft 0 in)
- Propulsion: One VM-4P pressurized-water twin nuclear reactor (2x75 MW), 2 sets OK-300 steam turbines; 1 7-bladed or 2 4-bladed props; 31,000 shp (23,000 kW) at 290 shaft rpm—2 low-speed electric cruise motors; 2 small props on stern planes; 1,020 shp (760 kW) at 500 rpm Electric: 4,460 kw tot. (2 × 2,000-kw, 380-V, 50-Hz a.c. OK-2 turbogenerators, 1 × 460-kw diesel emergency set
- Speed: 32 knots (59 km/h; 37 mph)
- Endurance: 80 days
- Complement: About 100 (27 officers, 34 warrant officers, 35 enlisted)
- Sensors & processing systems: Radar: 1 MRK-50 Albatros’-series (Snoop Tray-2) navigation/search; Sonar: MGK-503 Skat-KS (Shark Gill) suite: LF active/passive; passive flank array; Barrakuda towed passive linear; array (Victor III only); MT-70 active ice avoidance; EW: MRP-10 Zaliv-P/Buleva (Brick Pulp) intercept; Park Lamp direction-finder
- Armament: 4 bow torpedo tubes, 533 mm (21 in) (16 weapons - Type 83RN/Type 53-65K/USET-80 torpedoes, Type 84RN/SS-N-15 Starfish cruise missiles, VA-111 Shkval rocket torpedoes, MG-74 Korund and Siren decoys, or up to 36 naval mines)

K-324 was a Victor III-class submarine of the Russian Navy and previously the Soviet Navy. It was assigned to the Northern Fleet. It was removed from service in 2000 and scrapped in 2005.

== Service history ==
K-324's keel was laid down on 29 February 1980 at Komsomolsk Shipyard in Komsomolsk-on-Amur in the Russian Far East. It was launched on 7 October 1980 and commissioned on 30 December 1980. It was the seventh submarine of the class built at Komsomolsk.

=== Collision ===
In 1981, K-324 collided with an unidentified submarine of the Sturgeon class, purportedly USS Drum, in Peter the Great Bay, not far from Vladivostok. The submarine was heavily damaged, to all reports. The United States government denied any of their submarines were in the area, and no US submarine reported any damage during that time period, but the Soviets reported none of their submarines were in the Bay aside from K-324.

=== Fleet transfer and operations ===
K-324 transited across the Arctic in November and was officially transferred to the Northern Fleet on 3 December 1982.

=== Disabled ===
On 31 October 1983, K-324 snagged the US frigate USS McCloy's towed sonar array cable 282 miles (454 km) west of Bermuda, causing damage to the submarine's propeller. The submarine was towed to Cienfuegos, Cuba for repairs by a Soviet salvage ship beginning on 5 November. Soviet technicians recovered some parts of McCloy's array.

=== Later activities and decommissioning ===
K-324 was again involved in operations around US waters in 1985. She was reported to have detected American SSBNs on three occasions, tailing them for 28 hours. K-324 took advantage of temperature variations in the Gulf Stream. K-324 was in reserve by 1997. K-324 was written off in 2000 for scrapping.
