= Victor-class submarine =

Soviet nuclear-powered attack submarine

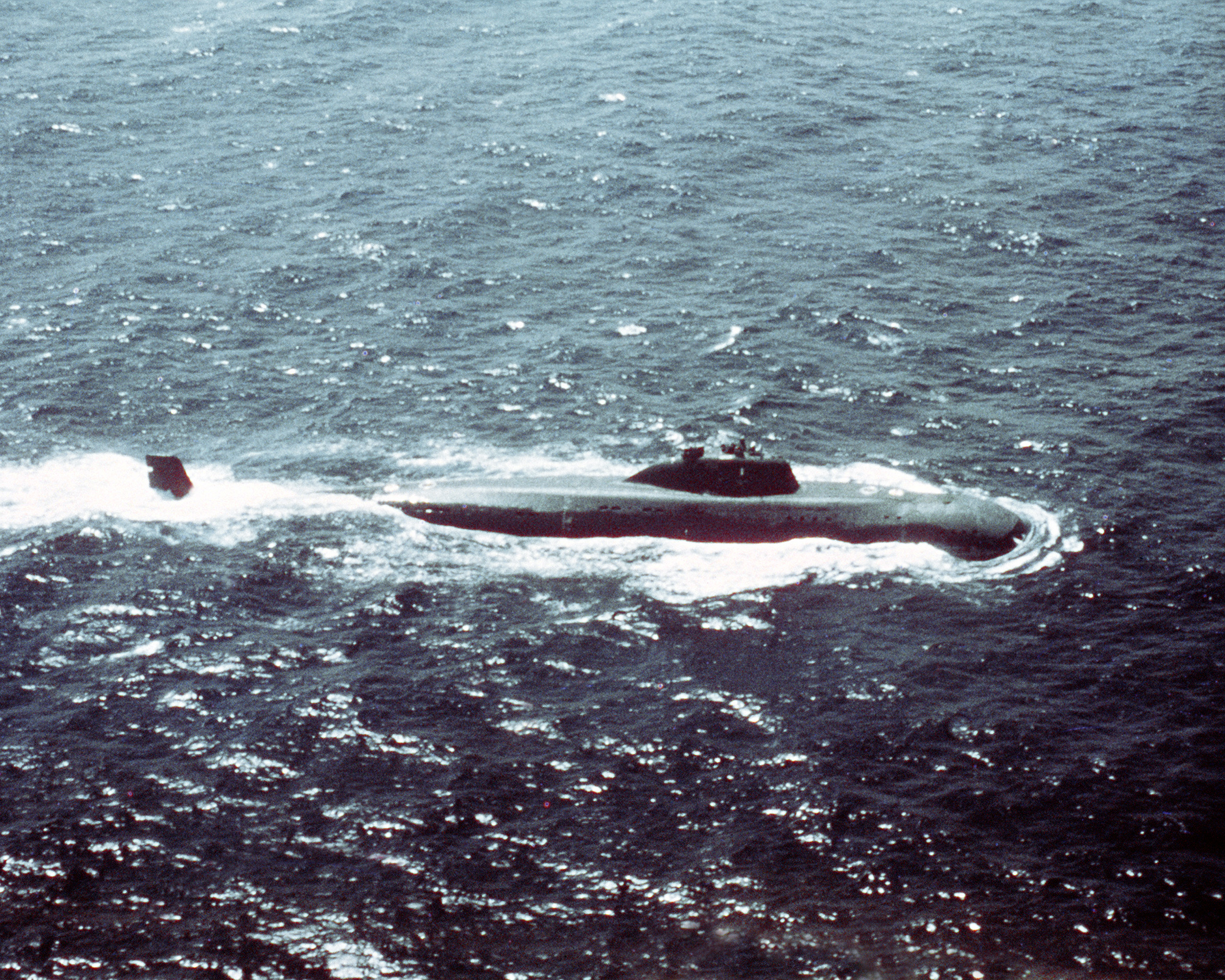
- A Victor I-class submarine underway

Class overview
- Name: Victor class
- Builders: Sudomekh Shipyard
- Operators: Soviet Navy; Russian Navy
- Preceded by: November class
- Succeeded by: Alfa class, Akula class
- In commission: 1967–present
- Completed: 48
- Active: 2
- Retired: 46

General characteristics
- Type: Nuclear attack submarine
- Displacement: 4,950 tons light surfaced; 6,990 tons normal surfaced; 7,250 tons submerged for Victor III
- Length: 92.5 m (303 ft) for Victor I; 101.8 m (334 ft) for Victor II; 107.1 m (351 ft) for Victor III
- Beam: 10 m (32 ft 10 in)
- Draft: 7 m (23 ft 0 in)
- Propulsion: One VM-4P pressurized-water twin nuclear reactor (2x75 MW), 2 sets OK-300 steam turbines; 1 7-bladed or 2 4-bladed props; 31,000 shp (23,000 kW) at 290 shaft rpm – 2 low-speed electric cruise motors; 2 small props on stern planes; 1,020 shp (760 kW) at 500 rpm Electric: 4,460 kw tot. (2 × 2,000-kw, 380-V, 50-Hz a.c. OK-2 turbogenerators, 1 × 460-kw diesel emergency set)
- Speed: 32 knots (59 km/h; 37 mph)
- Endurance: 80 days
- Complement: About 100 (27 officers, 34 warrant officers, 35 enlisted)
- Sensors & processing systems: Radar: 1 MRK-50 Albatros-series (Snoop Tray-2) navigation/search; Sonar: MGK-503 Skat-KS (Shark Gill) suite: LF active/passive; passive flank array; Barrakuda towed passive linear; array (Victor III only); MT-70 active ice avoidance; EW: MRP-10 Zaliv-P/Buleva (Brick Pulp) intercept; Park Lamp direction-finder
- Armament: Active vessels have 2 bow torpedo tubes, 650 mm (26 in) (6 weapons – Type 88R/SS-N-16 Stallion ASW missiles, Type 65-76 torpedoes); 4 bow torpedo tubes, 533 mm (21 in) (18 weapons – Type 83RN/Type 53-65K/USET-80 torpedoes, Type 84RN/SS-N-15 Starfish ASW missiles, VA-111 Shkval rocket torpedoes, MG-74 Korund and Siren decoys, or up to 36 naval mines)

The Victor class, Soviet designations Project 671 Yorsh, Project 671RT Syomga and Project 671RTM/RTMK Shchuka, (NATO reporting names Victor I, Victor II and Victor III, respectively), are series of nuclear-powered attack submarines built in the Soviet Union and operated by the Soviet Navy. Since the 1960s, 48 units were built in total, of which the last remaining are currently in service with the Russian Navy. The Victor-class submarines featured a teardrop shape, allowing them to travel at high speed. These vessels were primarily designed to protect Soviet surface fleets and to attack American ballistic missile submarines. Project 671 began in 1959 with the design task assigned to SKB-143 (one of the predecessors of the Malakhit Marine Engineering Bureau).

== Versions ==
=== Project 671 Yorsh (Victor I) ===
Project 671

Soviet designation Project 671 Yorsh (ruffe)—was the initial type that entered service in 1967; 15 were produced. Each had six torpedo tubes for launching Type 53 torpedoes and mines could also be released. Three ships had capability of launch SS-N-15 anti-submarine missiles, all three were transferred to Pacific fleet. Subs had a capacity of 24 tube-launched weapons or 48 mines (or a combination). They were 92.5 m (303 ft) long. All disposed.

=== Project 671RT Syomga (Victor II) ===
Project 671RT

Soviet designation Project 671RT Syomga (atlantic salmon)—entered service in 1972; seven were produced in the 1970s. These were originally designated Uniform class by NATO. They had similar armament to the Victor I class and were the first Soviet submarines to introduce raft mounting for acoustic quieting. Production was truncated due to a decision to develop the improved Victor III class. They were 101.8 m (334 ft) long. All disposed.

=== Project 671RTM/RTMK Shchuka (Victor III) ===
Project 671RTM

Soviet designation Project 671RTM/RTMK Shchuka (pike)—entered service in 1979; 25 were produced until 1991. Quieter than previous Soviet submarines, these ships had four tubes for launching SS-N-21 or SS-N-15 missiles and Type 53 torpedoes, plus another two tubes for launching SS-N-16 missiles and Type 65 torpedoes. 24 tube-launched weapons or 36 mines could be on board. The Victor III class caused a minor furor in NATO intelligence agencies at its introduction because of the distinctive pod on the vertical stern-plane. Speculation immediately mounted that the pod was the housing for some sort of exotic silent propulsion system, possibly a magnetohydrodynamic drive unit. Another theory proposed that it was some sort of weapon system. In the end, the pod was identified as a hydrodynamic housing for a reelable towed passive sonar array; the system was subsequently incorporated into the Sierra and Akula-class SSNs. In October 1983 the towed array of K-324, a Victor III operating west of Bermuda, became tangled with the towed array of US frigate USS McCloy. K-324 was forced to surface, allowing NATO forces to photograph the pod in its deployed state. The Victor-III class was continuously improved during construction and late production models have a superior acoustic performance. They were 106 m (348 ft) long. 21 disposed.

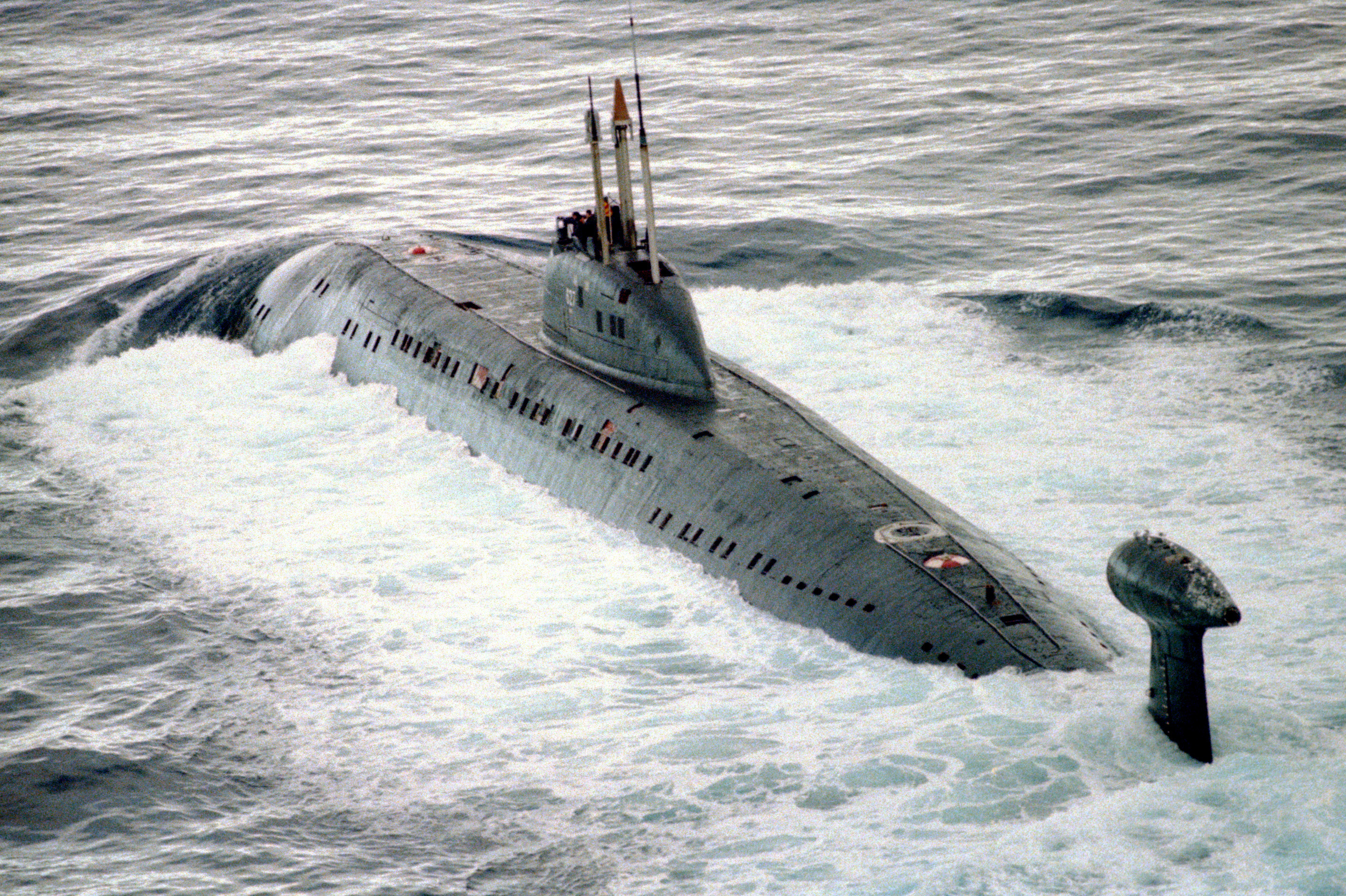
A Victor III-class submarine on the surface

== Incidents ==
- On 3 November 1974, the nuclear ballistic missile submarine USS James Madison (SSBN-627) collided with a Soviet submarine, assumed to be a Victor-class submarine, during a dive just after departing from Holy Loch. The American submarine was dented and suffered a nine-foot scratch on her hull. She spent a full week at the base for inspection and repairs.
- In 1981 USS Drum collided with a Victor III-class submarine—K-324—while attempting to photograph the odd pod on the back. The event was covered up by the Reagan Administration and never made public, though it nearly cost the lives of the sailors on USS Drum. The collision occurred in Peter the Great Bay, not far from Vladivostok. The incident was declassified and disclosed by the Clinton Administration in February 1993.
- On 21 March 1984, K-314 collided with the aircraft carrier USS Kitty Hawk in the Sea of Japan. Neither ship was significantly damaged.
- The Soviet cargo ship Bratstvo collided with the Soviet submarine K-53 of the Victor I-class in position Latitude 35 deg 55 min North and Longitude 005 deg 00 min West, at the exit from the Gibraltar Strait in Alboran Sea, on 18 (as per ship's time) or 19 (as per submarine time) September 1984.
- On 6 September 2006, the Victor III-class Daniil Moskovskiy suffered an electronics fire while in the Barents Sea, killing two crew members. The boat was 16 years old and was overdue for overhaul. It was towed back to Vidyayevo. She continued to serve into the latter 2010s and was reportedly formally decommissioned on 28 October 2022.

== In media ==
- A depiction of a Victor III-class submarine (Valentin Zukovsky's nephew Nikolai's own submarine) was used prominently in the James Bond film The World Is Not Enough as a key element in the film's antagonists' (Elektra King and Viktor "Renard" Zokas) plan.

== See also ==
- List of submarine classes in service
- Future of the Russian Navy

== Bibliography ==
- Hampshire, Edward (2020). Soviet Cold War Attack Submarines: Nuclear Classes from November to Akula. New Vanguard. Vol. 287. Osprey Publishing. ISBN 978-1-4728-3934-3.
- Pavlov, A. S. (1997). Warships of the USSR and Russia 1945–1995. Naval Institute Press. ISBN 1-55750-671-X.
- Polmar, Norman (2026). Submarines of the Russian and Soviet Navies: 1946–2026. Schiffer Publishing. ISBN 978-0-7643-7083-0.
- Polmar, Norman & Noot, Jurrien (1991). Submarines of the Russian and Soviet Navies, 1718–1990. Naval Institute Press. ISBN 0-87021-570-1.
