= USS McCloy =

1962 Bronstein-class frigate

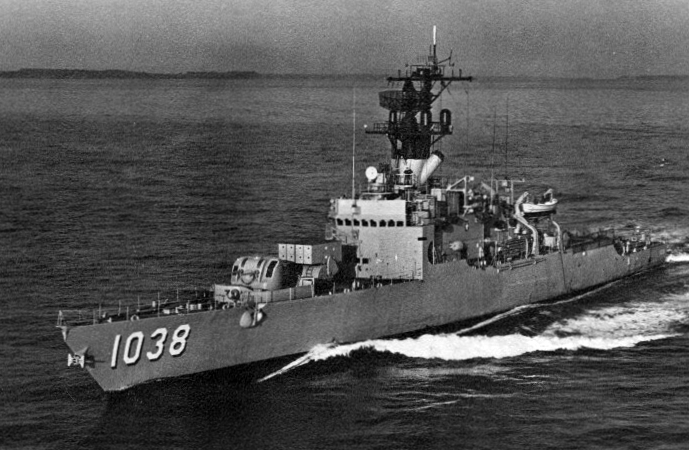
- USS McCloy (DE-1038) underway off the coast of South America in 1968.

History

United States
- Name: McCloy
- Namesake: John C. McCloy
- Ordered: 13 June 1960
- Builder: Avondale Shipyard, Inc., Westwego, Louisiana, U.S.
- Laid down: 15 September 1961
- Launched: 9 June 1962
- Commissioned: 21 October 1963
- Decommissioned: 14 December 1990
- Reclassified: 30 June 1975
- Stricken: 4 October 1991
- Identification: FF-1038
- Motto: "Above and Beyond"
- Fate: Donated to Mexico, 12 November 1993
- Badge

Mexico
- Name: Nicolás Bravo
- Namesake: Nicolás Bravo
- Acquired: 12 November 1993
- Decommissioned: April 2017
- Identification: F201
- Status: Decommissioned

General characteristics
- Class & type: Bronstein-class frigate
- Displacement: approx. 2,650 tons full load
- Length: 371.4 ft (113.2 m)
- Beam: 40.4 ft (12.3 m)
- Draft: 23 ft (7.0 m)
- Propulsion: 2 Foster-Wheeler boilers; 1 Westinghouse geared turbine; 35,000 shp (26,000 kW); 1 shaft
- Speed: 26 knots (48 km/h; 30 mph)
- Complement: 16 officers, 183 enlisted
- Sensors & processing systems: AN/SPS-10 surface search radar; AN/SPS-40 air search radar; AN/SPG-35 Gun fire control radar; AN/SQS-26 bow-mounted sonar; AN/SQR-15 towed sonar array
- Armament: one Mk-16 missile launcher for RUR-5 ASROC missiles; two Mk-33 3 in (76 mm)/50 cal. guns (one mount); Mk 46 torpedoes from two Mk 32 triple tube mounts
- Aircraft carried: None / QH-50 DASH

USS McCloy (FF-1038) was the second and final Bronstein-class frigate. Commissioned as a destroyer escort, McCloy was redesignated as frigate on 30 June 1975. Decommissioned on 14 December 1990, and stricken from the Navy list on 4 October 1991, McCloy was transferred to Mexico on 12 November 1993, where she was recommissioned as Nicolas Bravo. The ship was originally named for LCDR John C. McCloy, recipient of two Medals of Honor.

== Construction ==
McCloy's keel was laid down by the Avondale Shipyard, Inc., Westwego, Louisiana, 15 September 1961; launched 9 June 1962; sponsored by Mrs. Arthur Winstead; and commissioned 21 October 1963, at Charleston, South Carolina.

== Service history ==
Following outfitting and shakedown McCloy, assigned to Escort Squadron 10, reported to her home port, Newport, Rhode Island, in January 1964. In October, after further specialized training, she commenced training sonar technicians. Employed primarily as a schoolship throughout 1965, she also tested new anti-submarine warfare (ASW) weapons systems for the Operational Test and Evaluation Force. During this period she enhanced her training and testing capabilities as well as her operational abilities by participating in joint United States-Canadian exercises in the spring and fall and in ASW exercises at the end of the year.

In 1966 cruises saw her in the Bermuda area for NATO exercises (April); off the New England and Virginia coasts for convoy escort and ASW exercises (June, July, and August); and in the Caribbean for fleet tactical exercises (November–December). From 16 January until 24 May 1967 she participated in exercise Matchmaker III. This operation, which took McCloy from the Caribbean to northern Europe, was conducted jointly by American, Dutch, British, and Canadian ships. In what was called "Cross Pollinization," McCloy men transferred to the Dutch destroyer HNLMS Limburg and the British frigate HMS Berwick while men of those ships came on board the American escort vessel. USS Zellars also participated in the exercise.

McCloy spent the last half of 1967 and the first months of 1968 at Boston, Massachusetts, undergoing overhaul. She got underway again in March and sailed south, the next month, for refresher training at Guantánamo Bay, Cuba. Returning to Newport in June, she departed again 8 July for another extended cruise. On 11 July she arrived at San Juan, Puerto Rico where she joined naval units of the United States, Brazil, and Colombia for UNITAS IX. On 15 July, they commenced a clockwise circumnavigation of South America which first involved ships and planes of eight nations in exercises in the Atlantic, then around the Horn to the Pacific for more of the same, and finally through the Panama Canal back into the Caribbean before the end of the year. She continued her operations in the Atlantic into 1969.

McCloy was reclassified as a frigate (FF-1038) on 30 June 1975.

=== 1980s ===
McCloy deployed to the Mediterranean from January to June 1981. During this time frame, her Passive Anti-Submarine Towed Array Sonar Surveillance System (TASS) proved highly capable and successful in extensive tracking of submarines. McCloy returned to her home port in Norfolk, Virginia in June 1981 only to be sent to sea again on short notice to conduct additional Special ASW operations in the Bermuda "Box". McCloy departed Norfolk for another Mediterranean Deployment (MED 5–82) from July to December 1982. Using her primary weapon system, her TASS passive sonar system (a system of passive hydrophones towed behind the ship), she was immediately assigned to tracking of Soviet submarines in the Mediterranean.

Additionally in September 1982, McCloy was stationed at the entrance to Beirut, Lebanon harbor where an active conflict was ongoing between Israel and the Palestine Liberation Organization (PLO). She was assigned and completed the escort of nine ships used in the United Nations-arranged PLO evacuation from Beirut, escorting the ships to safe haven ports in the Mediterranean.

McCloy received a Meritorious Unit Commendation (MUC) for unsurpassed ASW accomplishments from 8 June to 22 December 1982 during this deployment. She also received the Sixth Fleet "Hook Em" Award and was designated as the Best ASW Ship in the Atlantic Fleet during the period 1 October 1980 to 31 March 1982 by Commander Naval Surface Force, U.S. Atlantic Fleet. Following this highly successful Med deployment, McCloy again conducted Special ASW Operations in the Western Atlantic Bermuda "Box" environment.

On 31 October 1983, McCloy snagged the K-324, a Soviet Victor III-class nuclear-powered attack submarine with her towed array, causing damage to the submarine's propeller. The submarine was towed to Cienfuegos, Cuba for repairs by a Soviet salvage ship beginning on 5 November 1983.

In the late 1980s, McCloy was involved in drug interdiction operations in the Caribbean Sea with a United States Coast Guard law enforcement detachment on board. She was involved in several large drug busts including a 50-ton marijuana seizure from the vessel Sea Wanderer in November 1986.

On 27 April 1988 McCloy assisted submarine rescue vessel USS Petrel and salvage ship USS Hoist in conducting rescue operations following a fire on submarine USS Bonefish.

=== Transfer and Mexican service ===
McCloy was decommissioned on 14 December 1990, stricken from the Naval Vessel Register on 17 December 1990, and transferred to Mexico on 1 October 1993 along with her sister ship Bronstein. In the Mexican Navy, McCloy was renamed ARM Nicolás Bravo (E40) for Nicolás Bravo, a Mexican politician and soldier.

== Awards ==
- Joint Meritorious Unit Award
- Meritorious Unit Commendation with star
- Coast Guard Meritorious Unit Commendation
- Navy "E" Ribbon (2 awards)
- Navy Expeditionary Medal
- National Defense Service Medal with star
- Humanitarian Service Medal
- Coast Guard Special Operations Service Ribbon
- Sea Service Deployment Ribbon with star
