= USS Drum (SSN-677) =

Submarine of the United States

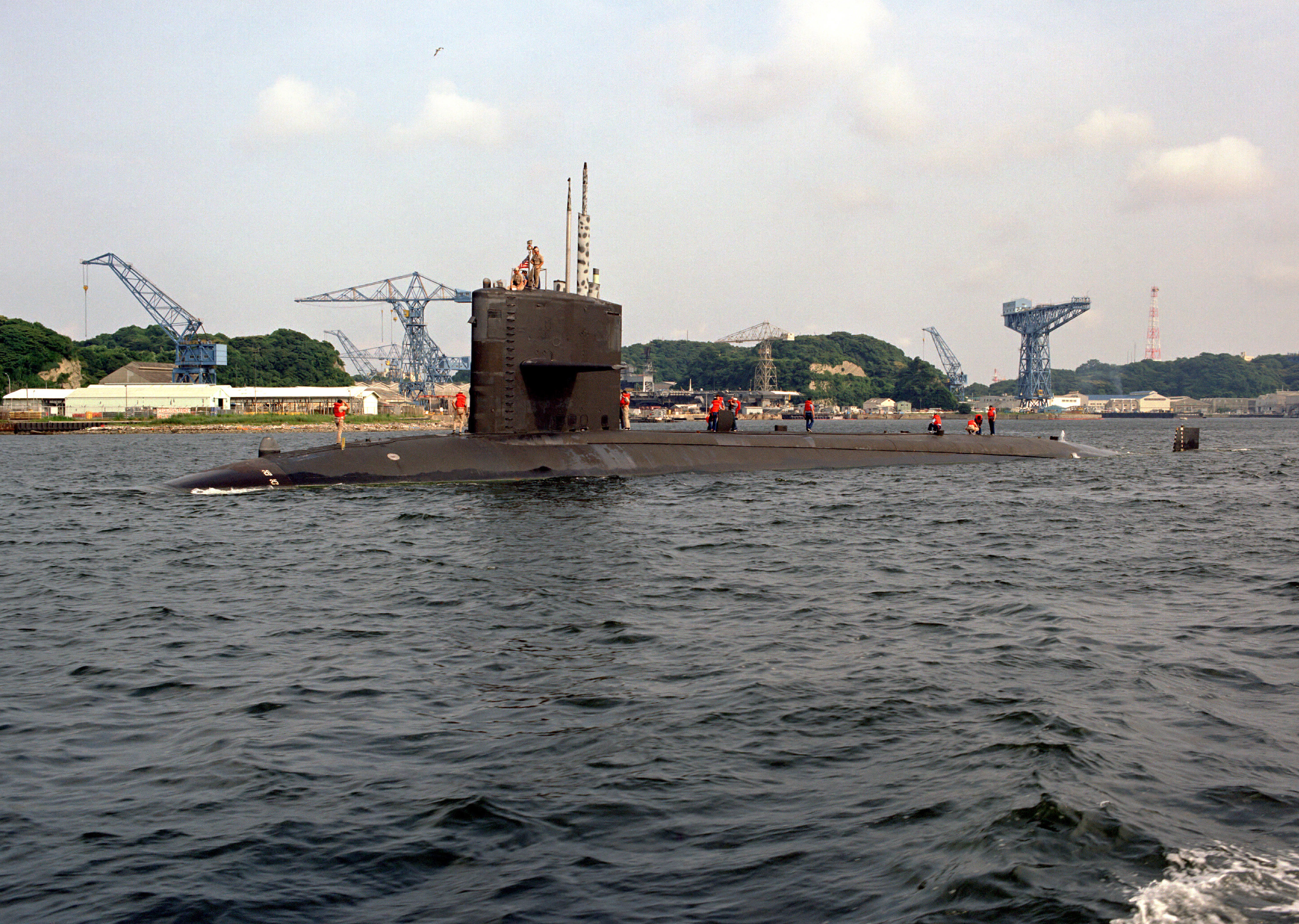
- USS Drum (SSN-677) entering port on 11 August 1984

History

United States
- Name: USS Drum
- Namesake: The drum, also known as the croaker or hardhead, any of various fishes of the Sciaenidae family
- Ordered: 15 March 1967
- Builder: Mare Island Naval Shipyard, Vallejo, California
- Laid down: 20 August 1968
- Launched: 23 May 1970
- Sponsored by: Mrs. William F. Bringle
- Commissioned: 15 April 1972
- Decommissioned: 30 October 1995
- Stricken: 30 October 1995
- Identification: SSN-677
- Motto: Pride Runs Deep
- Honors and awards: Navy Unit Commendation 1975; Meritorious Unit Commendation 1976; Meritorious Unit Commendation 1979; Navy Expeditionary Medal Iran/Indian Ocean 1981; Meritorious Unit Commendation 1984; Navy Expeditionary Medal 1984; Meritorious Unit Commendation 1988–1989; Navy Unit Commendation 1989; Battle Efficiency Award (Battle "E") Fiscal year 1990; Meritorious Unit Commendation 1990–1991; Battle "E" Fiscal Year 1991; Meritorious Unit Commendation 1992
- Fate: Scrapped via Ship and Submarine Recycling Program

General characteristics
- Class & type: Sturgeon-class attack submarine
- Displacement: 3,978 long tons (4,042 t) light; 4,270 long tons (4,339 t) full; 292 long tons (297 t) dead
- Length: 292 ft 3 in (89.08 m)
- Beam: 31 ft 8 in (9.65 m)
- Draft: 28 ft 8 in (8.74 m)
- Installed power: 15,000 shp (11,185 kW)
- Propulsion: One S5W nuclear reactor, two steam turbines, one screw
- Speed: 15 knots (28 km/h; 17 mph) surfaced; 25 knots (46 km/h; 29 mph) submerged
- Test depth: 1,300 ft (396 m)
- Complement: 109 (14 officers, 95 enlisted)
- Armament: 4 × 21-inch (533 mm) torpedo tubes

USS Drum (SSN-677), a Sturgeon-class attack submarine, was the second ship of the United States Navy to be named for the drum, also known as the croaker or hardhead, any of various fishes of the Sciaenidae family, capable of making a drumming noise and best known on the Atlantic coast of North America.

== Construction and commissioning ==
The contract to build Drum was awarded to Mare Island Naval Shipyard at Vallejo, California, on 15 March 1967, and her keel was laid down there on 20 August 1968. She was launched on 23 May 1970, sponsored by Mrs. William F. Bringle, wife of Vice Admiral William F. Bringle, commander of the United States Seventh Fleet, and commissioned on 15 April 1972. Drum was the last US naval vessel newly built in a naval shipyard.

== Service history ==
=== 1970s ===
After commissioning, Drum conducted initial testing in Puget Sound before arriving at her home port of San Diego, California, on 22 May 1972. Drum then commenced six months of operational tests and fleet training exercises in Puget Sound, the Hawaiian Islands, and off San Diego to become a unit of the United States Pacific Fleet Submarine Force. After completing these tests and exercises, Drum returned to Mare Island Naval Shipyard in November 1972 for one month of post-shakedown testing.

After completing the post-shakedown testing and follow-on operations in Southern California, Drum deployed in March 1973 on her first Western Pacific deployment; it also was the longest deployment of her career, lasting eight months before she returned to San Diego in November 1973.

Drum began her second deployment to the Western Pacific at the end of 1974, visiting Japan, Hong Kong, and the Philippines before returning to San Diego in May 1975. Drum was awarded her first Navy Unit Commendation for her successes during this deployment.

In June 1976, Drum departed San Diego for her third Western Pacific deployment, visiting Hong Kong, Japan, the Philippines, and Guam, and returned to San Diego in November 1976. She was awarded her first Meritorious Unit Commendation for her successes during this deployment.

1977 began with Drum changing her home port to Bremerton, Washington, and entering Puget Sound Naval Shipyard for Mark 48 torpedo impact testing and a non-refueling overhaul. She completed the overhaul in April 1978, ahead of schedule and under budget. She spent the next several months conducting operations in Puget Sound, including visits to Seattle and Everett in Washington and Esquimalt, British Columbia, Canada, until returning to San Diego, which once again became her home port, in July 1978.

From her return to San Diego until April 1979, Drum completed the rigorous training, testing, and loadout necessary prior to a deployment. She then deployed to the Western Pacific again from May to October 1979. During this deployment, she completed a special operation for which she was awarded her second Meritorious Unit Commendation and made port visits to Guam, Thailand, and the Philippines. After returning to San Diego in October 1979, she engaged in local operations and completed two months of repairs and alterations at Mare Island Naval Shipyard.

=== 1980s ===
In May 1980, after Drum returned to San Diego, and for the next several months, Drum operated in the San Diego area. She began her next Western Pacific deployment in October 1980, which included visits to Guam and the Philippines. This deployment lasted until mid-April 1981, when she returned to San Diego. In the course of that year the Soviet submarine K-324 collided with an unidentified American submarine, believed to be of the Los Angeles class, in the Peter the Great Bay, not far from Vladivostok. At least one source identifies this submarine as USS Drum.

In November 1981, Drum again departed San Diego for the Western Pacific, visiting South Korea, spending Christmas in Japan, and returning home at the beginning of 1982. She then conducted operations off Southern California and visited San Francisco, California, before starting another period of repairs and alterations in San Diego in the summer of 1982.

Upon completion of repairs, Drum concluded 1982 preparing for her next deployment. Shortly after Christmas 1982, Drum deployed to the Western Pacific. During this deployment, Drum visited the Philippines, Australia, and Japan, and also conducted operations in the Indian Ocean, during which she visited Diego Garcia. She returned to San Diego in June 1983.

After a routine standdown period at the end of this deployment, Drum participated in Advanced Capability (ADCAP) Mark 48 torpedo testing exercises at the tracking range at Canadian Forces Maritime Experimental and Test Ranges, Nanoose Bay, British Columbia.

In May 1984, Drum left San Diego for a Western Pacific deployment, stopping in Hawaii for RIMPAC '84, a multi-national naval exercise, then continued west with visits to the Philippines, Japan, Guam, and Thailand. Drum returned to San Diego in November 1984.

1985 began with local operations off Southern California and operations in Puget Sound, including a port visit to Esquimalt, British Columbia. In October 1985, Drum changed her home port to Bremerton, Washington, for the second time to begin her second and last overhaul – a refueling overhaul – at Puget Sound Naval Shipyard.

The refueling overhaul was completed in November 1987, and Drum returned to San Diego. which again became her home port, and became a unit of her new squadron, Submarine Squadron 11.

Drum spent most of 1988 in local operations and preparation for her next deployment. Nine months after completion of her refueling overhaul, Drum left San Diego for two months of independent operations, for which she was awarded her third Meritorious Unit Commendation.

In mid-May 1989, Drum departed on her tenth deployment to the Western Pacific, for which Drum was awarded her second Navy Unit Commendation. The deployment included visits to Lahaina, Hawaii, Maui and Pearl Harbor in Hawaii and to Japan. Drum returned to San Diego in August 1989 and continued operations in the Southern California area for the remainder of 1989.

=== 1990s ===
1990 began with repairs and alterations that were completed in March. On 1 April 1990, Drum transferred from Submarine Squadron 11 to Submarine Squadron 3.

Drum participated in RIMPAC '90, which included a port call at Lahaina, Maui, in the spring of 1990. After a summer of preparations, Drum departed San Diego in September 1990 for another deployment to the Western Pacific, during which she made port calls at Guam, Japan, and Singapore. Drum was awarded her fourth Meritorious Unit Commendation for operations conducted during this deployment, and while deployed, was awarded the Battle Efficiency Award (Battle "E") for Submarine Squadron 3 for her outstanding performance during fiscal year 1990. Drum returned to San Diego in March 1991.

In August 1991, Drum commenced independent operations. She returned to San Diego in late September 1991. In October 1991, she participated in San Francisco's Fleet Week '91.

Drum was awarded the Battle "E" for Submarine Squadron 3, for the second consecutive year for outstanding performance in Fiscal Year 1991.

In February 1992, Drum departed on another deployment to the Western Pacific. Port visits included Pearl Harbor, Japan, Guam, Singapore, and Australia, and she completed a 680 nautical miles (1,260 km) transit of the inner passage of the Great Barrier Reef. During this deployment, she was awarded her the fifth Meritorious Unit Commendation. She returned to San Diego in August 1992, then hosted a tour by senior Russian naval officers and dignitaries.

Drum departed San Diego on her next Western Pacific deployment on 27 December 1993. During this deployment, she visited Guam, Japan, and New Caledonia.

In 1994, Drum participated in San Francisco's Fleet Week '94 and made a port visit to Astoria, Oregon.

On 13 February 1995, Drum departed San Diego for her thirteenth and last deployment to the Western Pacific, which included a visit to Guam. While leaving port in Hong Kong during the deployment, she collided with the Panamanian-registered cargo ship Sei Bright. Sei Bright suffered slight damage to her bow. No one was injured on either ship nor did Drum suffer notable damage. Drum returned to San Diego on 13 April 1995. Her Commanding Officer was relieved of duty pending investigation of the collision, later resolved as "not for cause."

At 1300 hours on 20 May 1995, an inactivation ceremony was held for Drum at San Diego. In late May 1995, she departed San Diego for the last time, destined for Pearl Harbor, where she would undergo deactivation at Pearl Harbor Naval Shipyard.

== Decommissioning and disposal ==
Drum was decommissioned and stricken from the Naval Vessel Register on 30 October 1995. Afterwards, she was stored at the Puget Sound Naval Shipyard, awaiting entry into the Nuclear-Powered Ship and Submarine Recycling Program for scrapping.

On 20 May 2010 the ex-Drum entered drydock for the last time. The ship was recycled in drydock three at Puget Sound Naval Shipyard and IMF. In early 2011 her reactor compartment was shipped to Hanford, Washington, for burial. The sail of the USS Drum was removed for display. It is currently on display at U.S. Navy Recruit Training Command, Great Lakes, Illinois.

== Preservation efforts ==
The non-profit Mare Island Park Historic Foundation was raising money to return Drum to Vallejo as a floating museum ship. In Fiscal Year 1997, the United States Congress authorized the transfer of Drum to Vallejo at "no cost to the U.S. Government". If enough money had been raised to cover the cost of that transfer, Drum would have been transferred to Vallejo after removal of her nuclear reactor and decontamination of her hull. These efforts were unsuccessful.

== Notes ==
Red November, Inside the Secret U.S. Soviet Submarine War
