= VM reactor =

Russian nuclear pressurized water reactors

The VM reactor (Russian: реактор ВМ) is type of various series of nuclear pressurized water reactors (PWR). They were used singly or in pairs to power the Soviet Navy's submarines.

It was developed by NIKIET.

In December 2025, it was reported that a ship called the MV Ursa Major that sank near Spain in 2024 was carrying two VM-4SG reactors intended for North Korea. North Korea has claimed to be completing a nuclear submarine.

== Series ==
- The VM-A reactor was the nuclear fission reactor used in pairs to power the Soviet Navy's Project 658 and 701 (Hotel), Project 659 and 675 (Echo), and Project 627 Кит (November) first-generation submarines. It was a pressurized water reactor (PWR), using 21% enriched uranium-235 fuel to produce 70 MW (94,000 hp) of power. This is the reactor that powered K-19.
- The VM-4 reactor is a nuclear fission reactor using 20% enriched uranium-235 fuel to produce 70–90 MW (94,000–121,000 hp) of power. It is used:
  - singly to power the Project 670 Скат and Чайка-Б (Charlie) submarines
  - in pairs to power the Project 671 Ёрш and Щука (Victor), Project 667 Мурена, Кальмар, and Дельфин (Delta), and Project 667 Навага, Налим, Груша, and Андромеда (Yankee) second-generation submarines.
- The VM-5 reactor was the nuclear fission reactor used in a pair to power the Soviet Navy's Project 661 Анчар - Anchar (Papa) second-generation submarine K-222. It was a pressurized water reactor (PWR) using enriched uranium-235 fuel to produce 177 MW (237,000 hp) of power.
