= List of active Russian Navy ships =

Naval Ensign of Russia (St. Andrew's flag)

Naval Jack of Russia

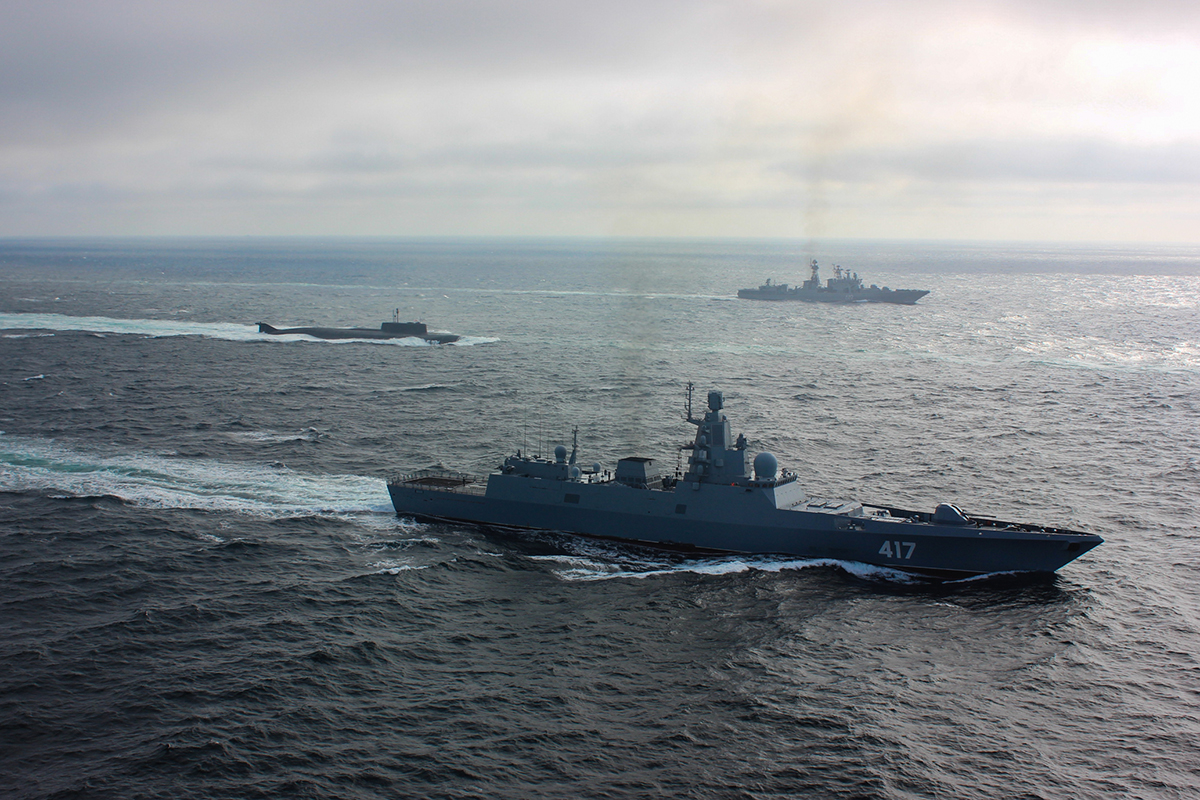
The Northern Fleet ships Admiral Gorshkov-class frigate Admiral Gorshkov (foreground), Oscar II-class cruise-missile submarine Orel (middle) and Udaloy-class destroyer Severomorsk (background) in 2018

This list of active Russian Navy ships presents a picture which can never be fully agreed upon in the absence of greater data availability and a consistent standard for which ships are considered operational or not. The Soviet Navy, and the Russian Navy which inherited its traditions, had a different attitude to operational status than many Western navies. Historically, ships went to sea less and maintained capability for operations while staying in harbor.

The significant changes which followed the collapse of the Soviet Union then complicated the picture enormously. Determining which ships were and are operational, or in refit, can be difficult. As Jane's Fighting Ships noted in one of its 1999–2000 editions, some ships had little capability, but continued flying an ensign so that crews are entitled to be paid. Jane's Fighting Ships online edition, dated 8 March 2010, added that: "There are large numbers of most classes 'in reserve', and flying an ensign so that skeleton crews may still be paid. [Their listing reflected] only those units assessed as having some realistic operational capability or some prospect of returning to service after refit."

Over the past two decades there has been an attempt to modernize and update the fleet. From the 2010s there has been a shift toward the production and introduction of modern light units to begin to replace large numbers of obsolescent corvettes, missile boats and mine counter-measures ships from the Soviet-era. In addition, there has been a renewed emphasis on submarine production with the introduction of nuclear-powered ballistic missile, nuclear-powered cruise missile as well as new classes of conventionally-powered attack submarines. This trend is continuing through the 2020s, particularly in relation to the submarine component of Russia's nuclear deterrent forces.

Since the start of the Russo-Ukraine War, the Russian Navy has experienced losses in ships and materiel in the Black Sea Fleet. In the context of a conflict that is still ongoing, descriptions of the navy's order of battle may, at times, be imprecise. Some ships found in the list below may have been sunk or damaged or already retired from service; others, not on the list, may in fact still be in service or in reserve with the fleet. Nevertheless, the information presented below constitutes a best estimate on the state of the Russian navy based on open sources. For a list of likely Russian and Ukrainian ship losses in the war see: List of ship losses during the Russo-Ukrainian War.

== Fleets ==
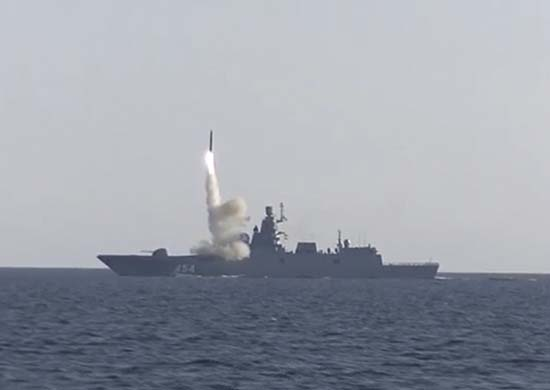
The Admiral Gorshkov frigate launches a 3M22 Zircon hypersonic missile from its 3S14 vertical launching system (VLS)

- Northern Fleet (NF) – Severomorsk
- Pacific Fleet (PF) – Fokino, Primorsky Krai
- Black Sea Fleet (BSF) – Sevastopol
- Baltic Fleet (BF) – Kaliningrad
- Caspian Flotilla (CF) – Astrakhan

== Ships and submarines in service ==
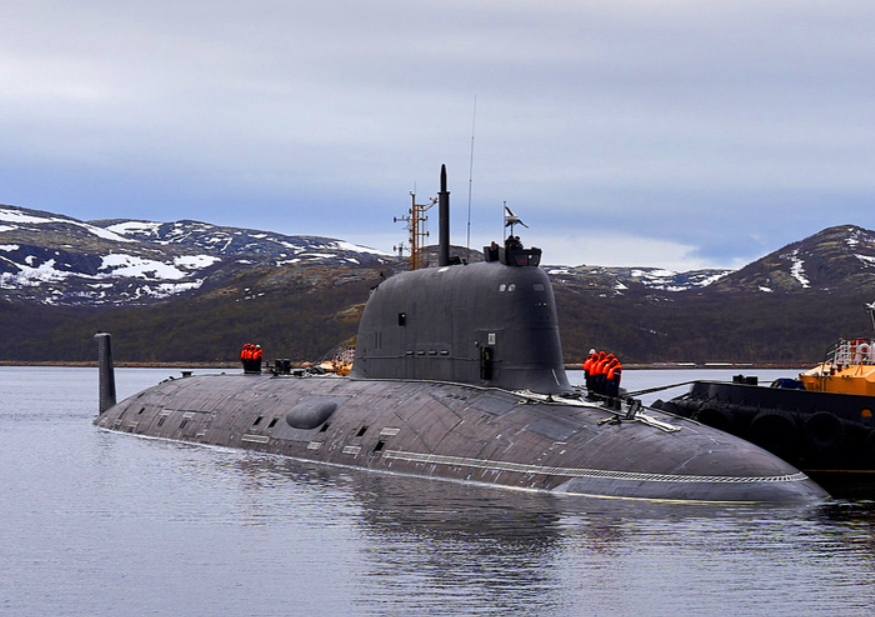
Russian Yasen-M-class nuclear-powered attack submarines are armed with VLS

(Summary: c. 67 submarines (Note: Some sources list a larger number of submarines For instance, the website "Russian Navy Ships" lists 81 submarines as of 2026. However, confirmation is often difficult and the actual status of some boats - both on and off the list below - is unclear; some may be inactive, in reserve, otherwise not operational or even decommissioned) & c. 222 surface warships - incl. major/minor surface combatants, amphibious ships, patrol vessels/boats, mine countermeasures vessels - plus numerous landing craft, intelligence ships and other auxiliaries; Including those in reserve or in refit and overhaul; numbers often vary depending on source)

- 14 Ballistic missile submarines
- 6 Cruise missile submarines
- 18 Nuclear-powered attack submarines
- c. 19 Diesel/electric-powered attack submarines
- c. 10 Special-purpose submarines
- 1 Aircraft carrier (in commission, but not operational)
- 1 Battlecruiser (Pyotr Velikiy to be retired upon completion of modernization of Admiral Nakhimov)
- 2 Cruisers
- 8 Destroyers
- 12 Frigates
- c. 79 Corvettes
- 17 Landing ships
- 50+ Landing craft
- 5 Patrol ships
- c. 60+ Patrol boats (significant numbers of additional offshore patrol vessels/light patrol boats are operated by the Russian Coast Guard, Federal Protective Service, Russian National Guard and other agencies)
- 43+ Mine countermeasures vessels
- 18 Special-purpose (intelligence) ships
- Numerous other auxiliaries

== Submarines ==
=== Strategic ballistic missile submarines ===
Class	Project	Boat	Pennant No.	Commissioned	Displacement	Fleet	Note
Quantity (13)
Delta IV	667BDRM	Verkhoturye	K-51	1984	18,200 t	Northern Fleet	Active as of 2025
Delta IV	667BDRM	Tula	K-114	1987	18,200 t	Northern Fleet	Active as of 2025
Delta IV	667BDRM	Bryansk	K-117	1988	18,200 t	Northern Fleet	Refit completed, active as of 2025
Delta IV	667BDRM	Karelia	K-18	1989	18,200 t	Northern Fleet	Repairs completed in 2026
Delta IV	667BDRM	Novomoskovsk	K-407	1990	18,200 t	Northern Fleet	Active as of 2025
Delta IV	667BDRM	Ekaterinburg	K-84	1985	18,200 t	Northern Fleet	Inactive, to be decommissioned
Borei	955	Yuriy Dolgorukiy	K-535	2013	24,000 t	Northern Fleet	Refit and overhaul until 2027
Borei	955	Aleksandr Nevskiy	K-550	2013	24,000 t	Pacific Fleet	Active as of 2021
Borei	955	Vladimir Monomakh	K-551	2014	24,000 t	Pacific Fleet	Active as of 2020
Borei	955A	Knyaz Vladimir	K-549	2020	24,000 t	Northern Fleet	Active as of 2026
Borei	955A	Knyaz Oleg	K-552	2021	24,000 t	Pacific Fleet	Active; arrived in the Pacific September 2022
Borei	955A	Generalissimus Suvorov	K-553	2022	24,000 t	Pacific Fleet	Active as of 2026
Borei	955A	Imperator Aleksandr III	K-554	2023	24,000 t	Pacific Fleet	Active; arrived in the Pacific September 2024
Borei	955A	Knyaz Pozharsky	K-555	2025	24,000 t	Northern Fleet	Active as of 2025

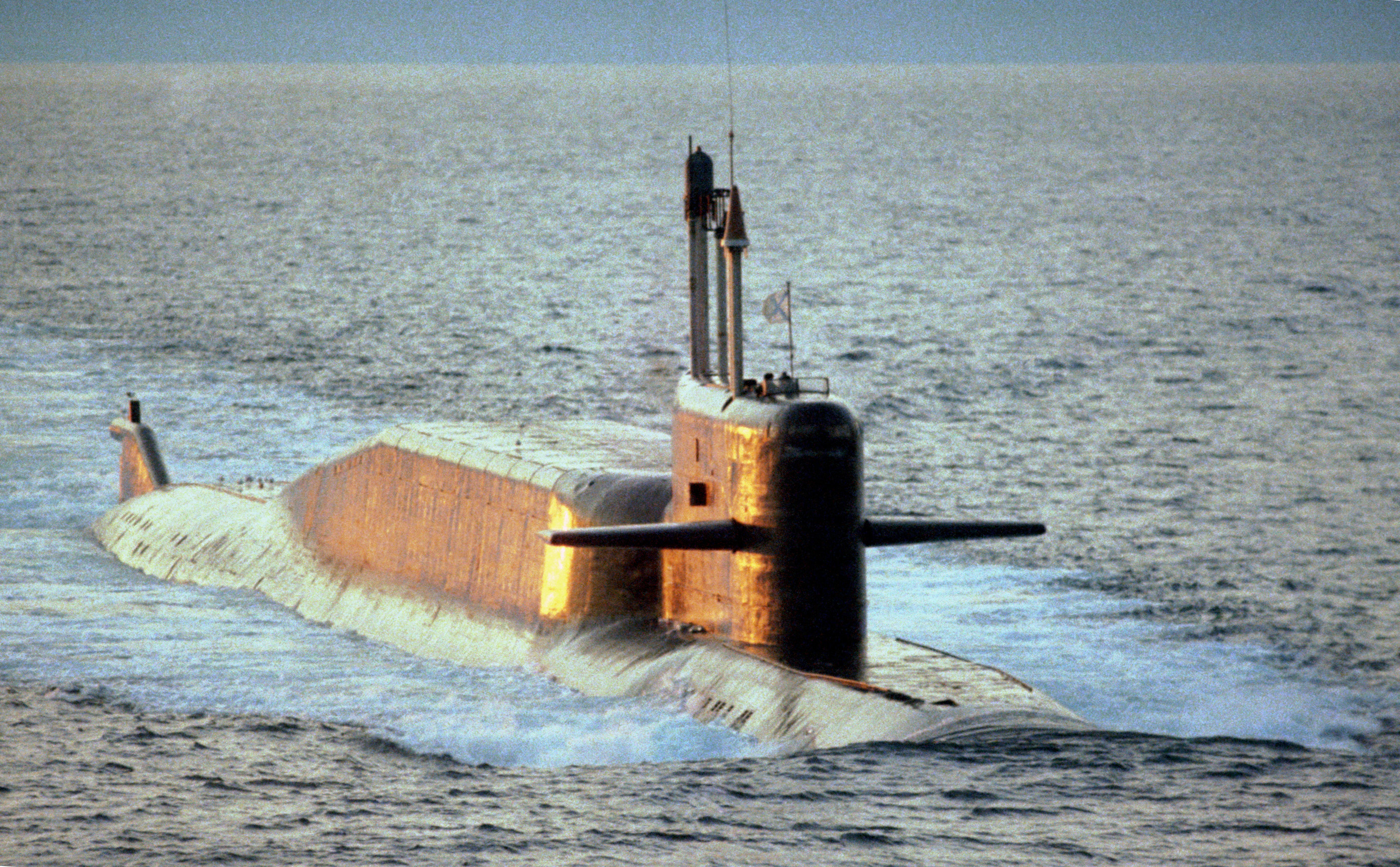
(Delta IV class)

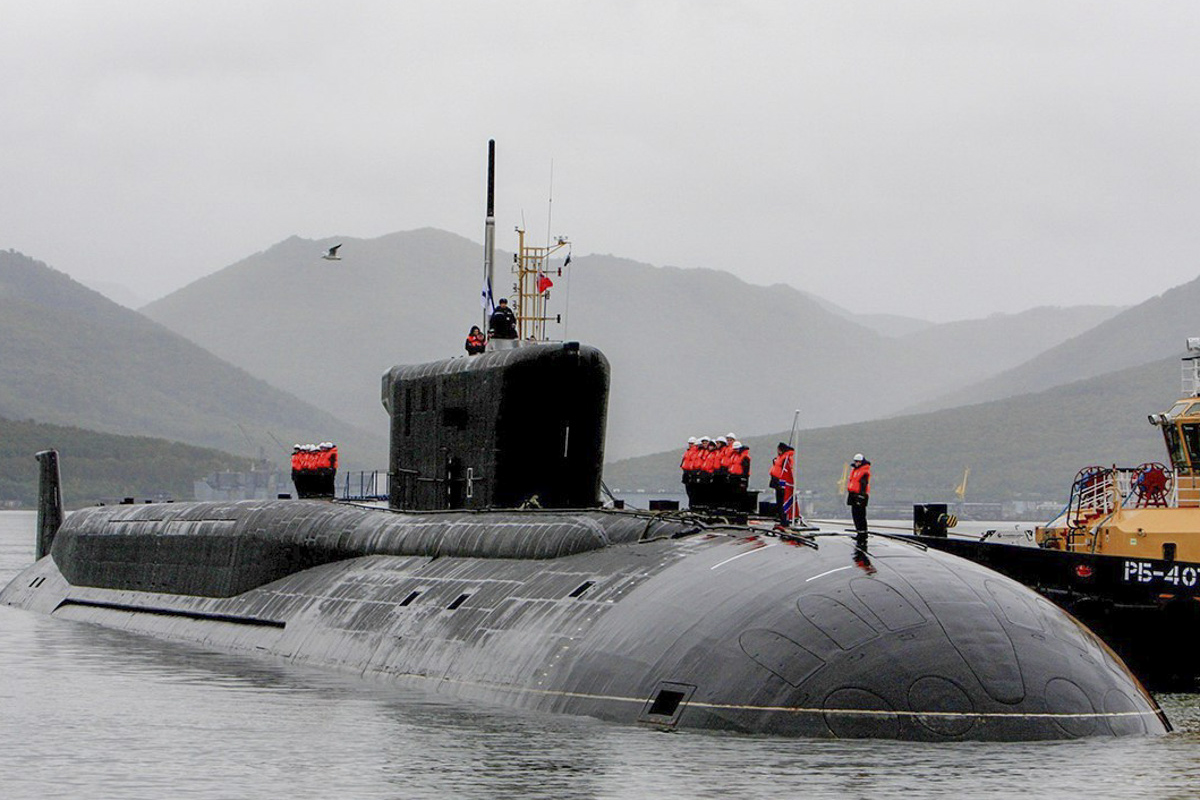
(Borei class)

=== Cruise missile submarines ===
Oscar II-class cruise missile submarines are gradually being replaced by Yasen and Yasen-M-class attack submarines which are also armed with vertical launching system (VLS) to launch cruise missiles.

Class	Project	Boat	Pennant No.	Commissioned	Displacement	Fleet	Note
Quantity (6)
Oscar II	949A	Chelyabinsk	K-442	1990	19,400 t	Pacific Fleet	In refit, spent nuclear fuel unloaded in April 2022
Oscar II	949A	Smolensk	K-410	1990	19,400 t	Northern Fleet	Active as of 2022
Oscar II	949A	Orel	K-266	1992	19,400 t	Northern Fleet	Active as of 2026
Oscar II	949A	Tver (ex.Vilyuchinsk)	K-456	1992	19,400 t	Pacific Fleet	In reserve
Oscar II	949A	Omsk	K-186	1993	19,400 t	Pacific Fleet	Active as of 2025
Oscar II	949A	Tomsk	K-150	1996	19,400 t	Pacific Fleet	Active as of 2023

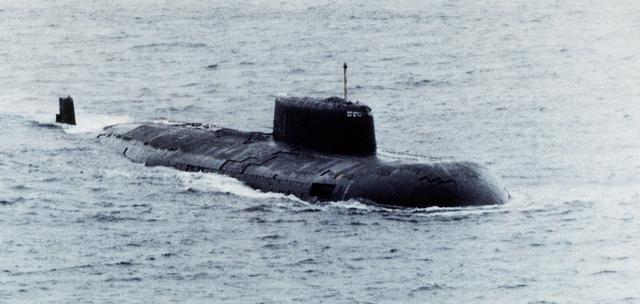
(Oscar II class)

=== Nuclear-powered attack submarines ===
All currently active previous generation nuclear-powered attack submarine classes are gradually being replaced by Yasen and Yasen-M-class nuclear-powered attack submarines.

Class	Project	Boat	Pennant No.	Commissioned	Displacement	Fleet	Note
Quantity (18)
Sierra II	945A	Nizhny Novgorod	K-534	1990	9,100 t	Northern Fleet	Both described as in reserve/minimally active as of 2026
Sierra II	945A	Pskov	K-336	1993	9,100 t	Northern Fleet	Both described as in reserve/minimally active as of 2026
Victor III	671RTMK	Obninsk	K-138	1990	7,250 t	Northern Fleet	reported on post-refit trials as of 2022; status unclear, may have decommissioned (not confirmed)
Victor III	671RTMK	Tambov	K-448	1992	7,250 t	Northern Fleet	Active as of 2024; completed prolonged refit in 2022/23
Akula	971	Pantera	K-317	1990	12,770 t	Northern Fleet	In reserve
Akula	971	Magadan	K-331	1990	12,770 t	Pacific Fleet	Official name Narval, undergoing refit
Akula	971I	Kuzbass	K-419	1992	12,770 t	Pacific Fleet	Active as of 2022
Akula	971I	Volk	K-461	1992	12,770 t	Northern Fleet	(Note: Upgrade to 971M.) Undergoing refit: Expected to be complete in 2028
Akula	971I	Leopard	K-328	1993	12,770 t	Northern Fleet	(Note: Upgrade to 971M.)On sea trials as of 2026 following refit and upgrade
Akula	971I	Tigr	K-154	1994	12,770 t	Northern Fleet	Undergoing refit
Akula	971I	Samara	K-295	1995	12,770 t	Pacific Fleet	(Note: Undergoing maintenance since August 2014.) Undergoing refit: Old equipment dismantled, main refit has not yet started
Akula	971U	Vepr	K-157	1996	13,400 t	Northern Fleet	Reported active as of 2025
Akula	971M	Gepard	K-335	2000	13,800 t	Northern Fleet	Reported active as of 2025
Yasen	885	Severodvinsk	K-560	2014	13,800 t	Northern Fleet	Active as of 2025
Yasen	885M	Kazan	K-561	2021	13,800 t	Northern Fleet	Active as of 2026
Yasen	885M	Novosibirsk	K-573	2021	13,800 t	Pacific Fleet	Active as of 2026
Yasen	885M	Krasnoyarsk	K-571	2023	13,800 t	Pacific Fleet	Active; arrived in the Pacific September 2024
Yasen	885M	Arkhangelsk	K-564	2024	13,800 t	Northern Fleet	Active as of 2026

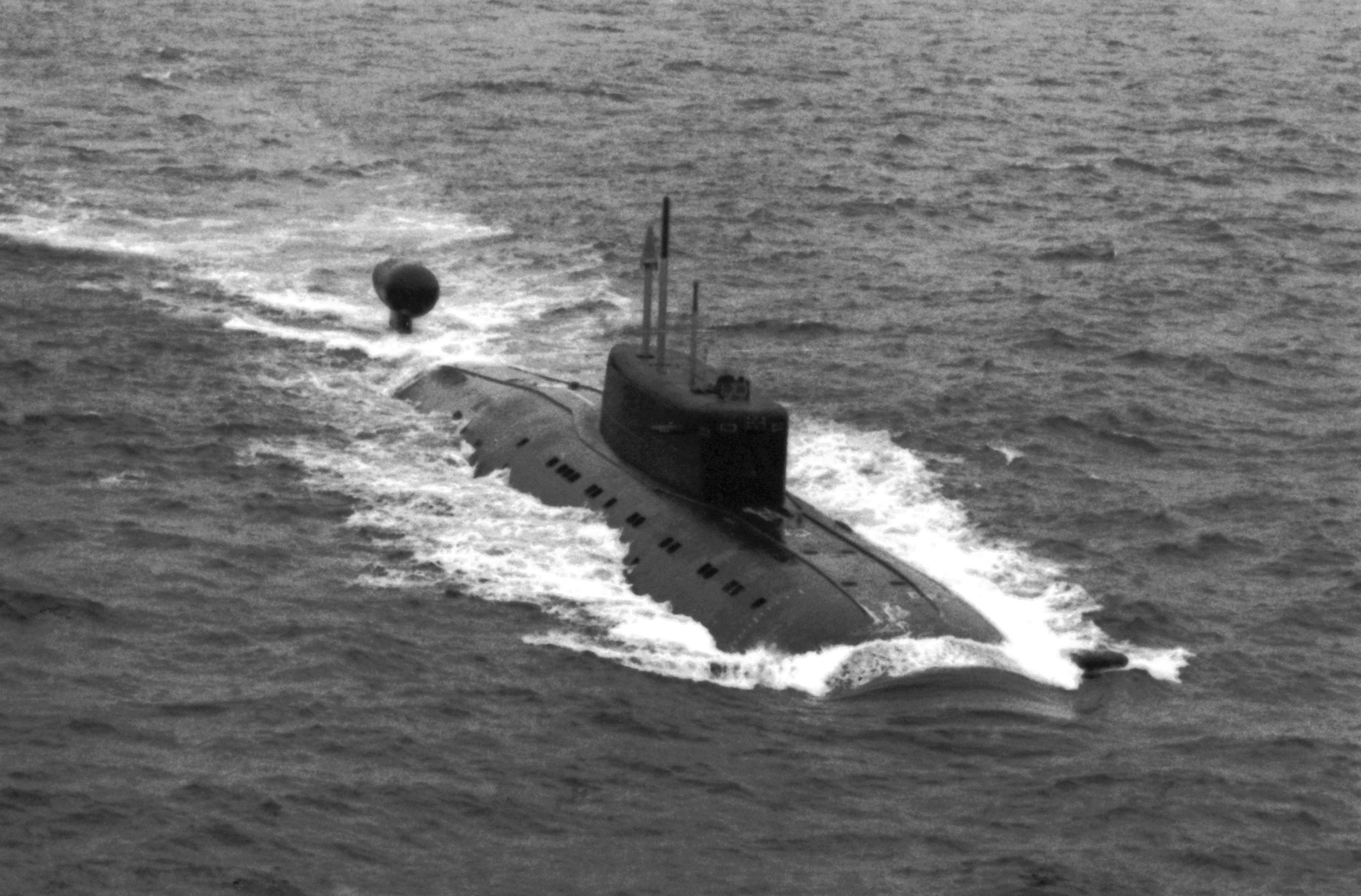
(Sierra II class)

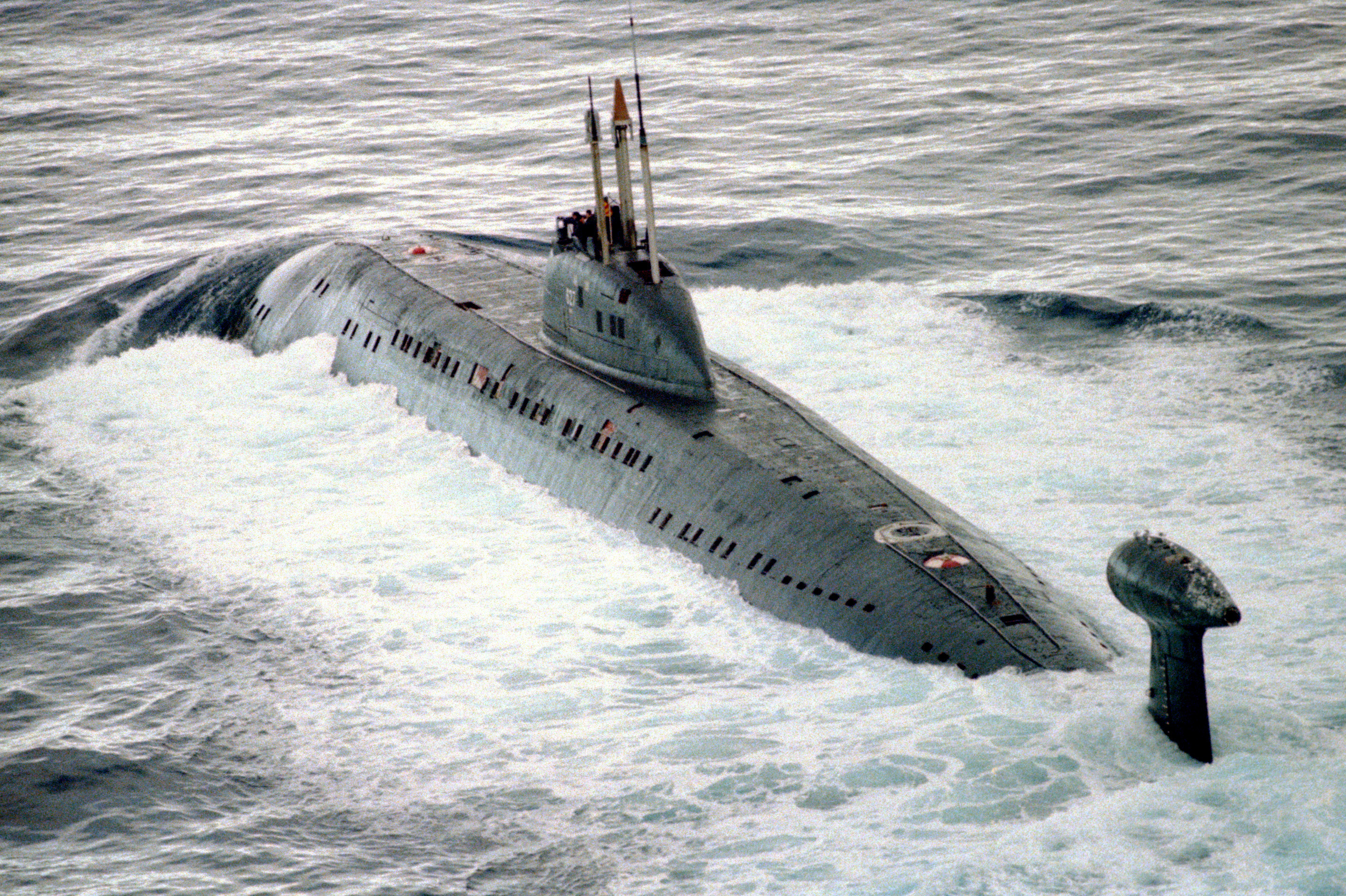
(Victor III class)

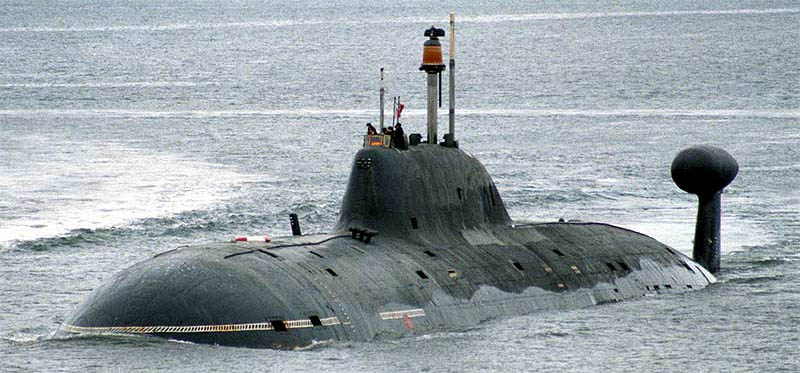
(Akula class)

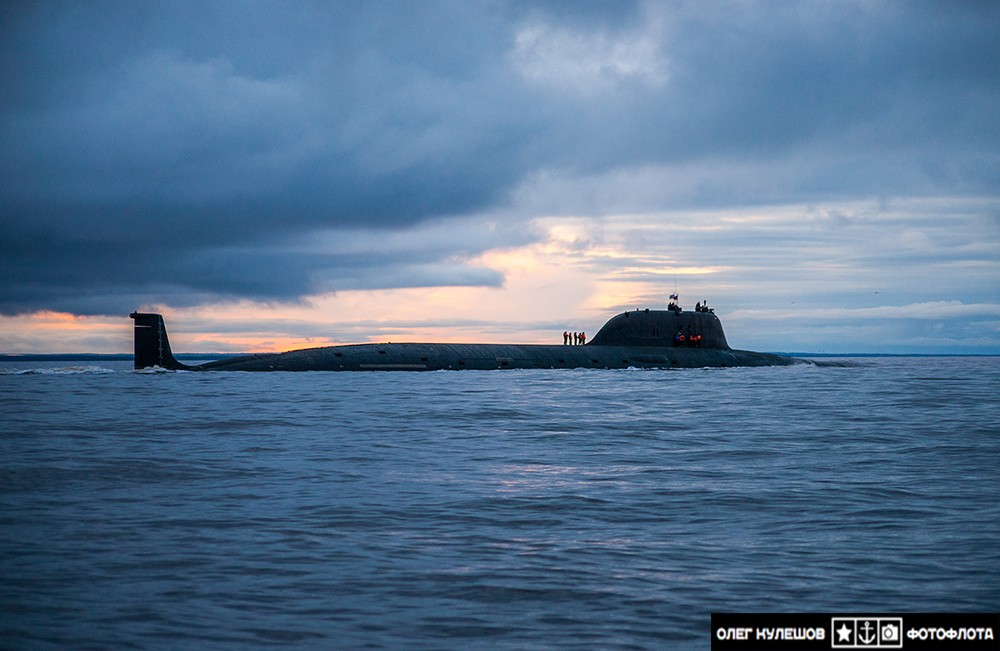
(Yasen class)

=== Conventional attack submarines ===
Class	Project	Boat	Pennant No.	Commissioned	Displacement	Fleet	Note
Quantity (19)
Kilo	877	Vladikavkaz	B-459	1990	3,075 t	Northern Fleet	Vladikavkaz active as of 2021; Kaluga active as of 2025; two other Project 877 Kilos (Magnitogorsk & Lipetsk) tasked to the Northern Fleet but unclear if operational
Kilo	877LPMB	Kaluga	B-800	1989	3,075 t	Northern Fleet	Vladikavkaz active as of 2021; Kaluga active as of 2025; two other Project 877 Kilos (Magnitogorsk & Lipetsk) tasked to the Northern Fleet but unclear if operational
Kilo	877	Komsomolsk-na-Amure	B-187	1991	3,075 t	Pacific Fleet	Active; may continue in service to 2030; two other Project 877 Kilos (Nurlat & Ust'-Kamchatsk) tasked to the Pacific Fleet but unclear if operational
Kilo	877EKM	Dmitrov	B-806	1986	3,075 t	Baltic Fleet	Active
Kilo	877V	Alrosa	B-871	1990	3,075 t	Black Sea Fleet	Active as of the start of the Russo-Ukraine War
Improved Kilo	636.3	Novorossiysk	B-261	2014	3,100 t	Black Sea Fleet	Active; deployed in the Mediterranean/Baltic since start of Russo-Ukraine War; reportedly damaged by fuel system malfunction in the Mediterranean in September 2025
Improved Kilo	636.3	Rostov na Donu?	B-237	2014	3,100 t	Black Sea Fleet	Hit and heavily damaged (Ukraine claimed "sunk") in dry dock by Ukrainian missile attack, August 2, 2024
Improved Kilo	636.3	Krasnodar	B-265	2015	3,100 t	Black Sea Fleet	Reported active as of 2026; deployed in the Mediterranean/Baltic since start of Russo-Ukraine War
Improved Kilo	636.3	Velikiy Novgorod	B-268	2016	3,100 t	Black Sea Fleet	At least two 636.3 Kilos likely active in the Black Sea as of late 2025; third boat (likely B-271 Kolpino) reported damaged or destroyed in Ukrainian UUV attack at Novorossiysk in December 2025, however extent of damage disputed
Improved Kilo	636.3	Kolpino?	B-271	2016	3,100 t	Black Sea Fleet	At least two 636.3 Kilos likely active in the Black Sea as of late 2025; third boat (likely B-271 Kolpino) reported damaged or destroyed in Ukrainian UUV attack at Novorossiysk in December 2025, however extent of damage disputed
Improved Kilo	636.3	Staryy Oskol?	B-262	2015	3,100 t	Black Sea Fleet	At least two 636.3 Kilos likely active in the Black Sea as of late 2025; third boat (likely B-271 Kolpino) reported damaged or destroyed in Ukrainian UUV attack at Novorossiysk in December 2025, however extent of damage disputed
Improved Kilo	636.3	Petropavlovsk-Kamchatsky	B-274	2019	3,100 t	Pacific Fleet	Active as of 2026
Improved Kilo	636.3	Volkhov	B-603	2020	3,100 t	Pacific Fleet	Active; arrived in the Pacific November 2021
Improved Kilo	636.3	Magadan	B-602	2021	3,100 t	Pacific Fleet	Active; arrived in the Pacific in October 2022.
Improved Kilo	636.3	Ufa	B-588	2022	3,100 t	Pacific Fleet	Active as of 2026
Improved Kilo	636.3	Mozhaysk	B-608	2023	3,100 t	Pacific Fleet	Active; deployed in the Baltic as of mid-2025
Improved Kilo	636.3	Yakutsk	B-	2025	3,100 t	Pacific Fleet	Active; deployed in the Baltic as of June 2025
Lada	677	Kronshtadt	B-586	2024	2,700 t	Northern Fleet	Active
Lada	677	Velikiye Luki	B-587	2025	2,700 t	Baltic or Northern Fleet	Active

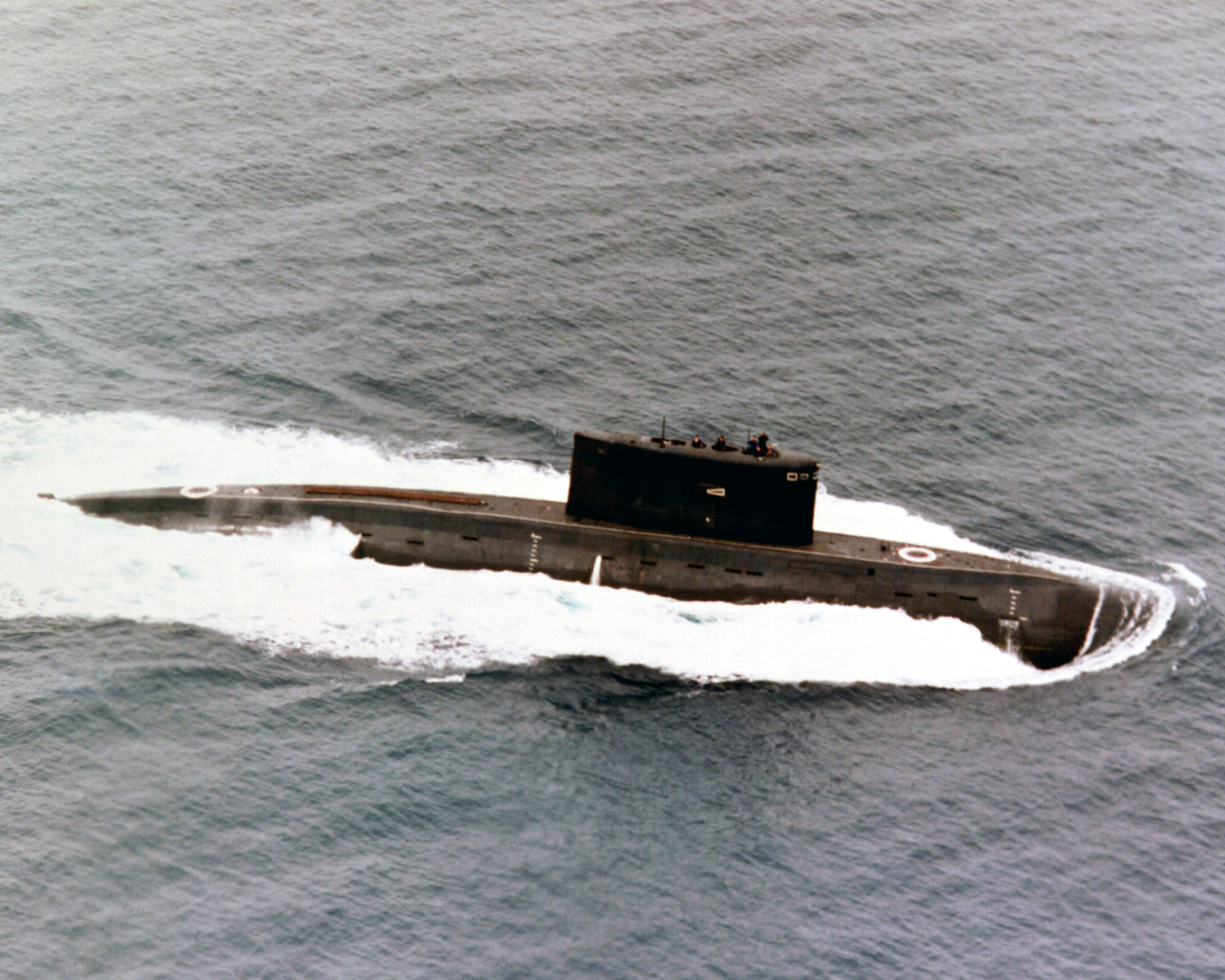
(Kilo class)

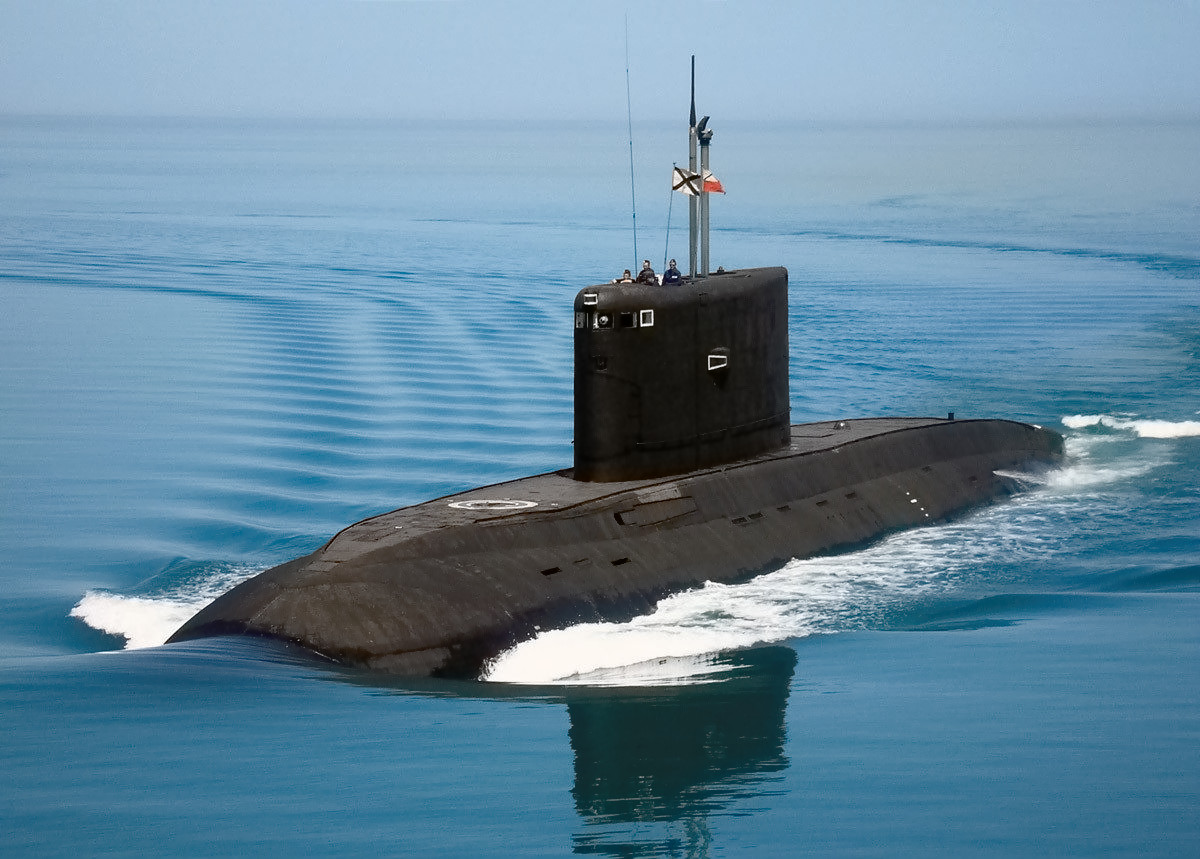
(Improved Kilo class)

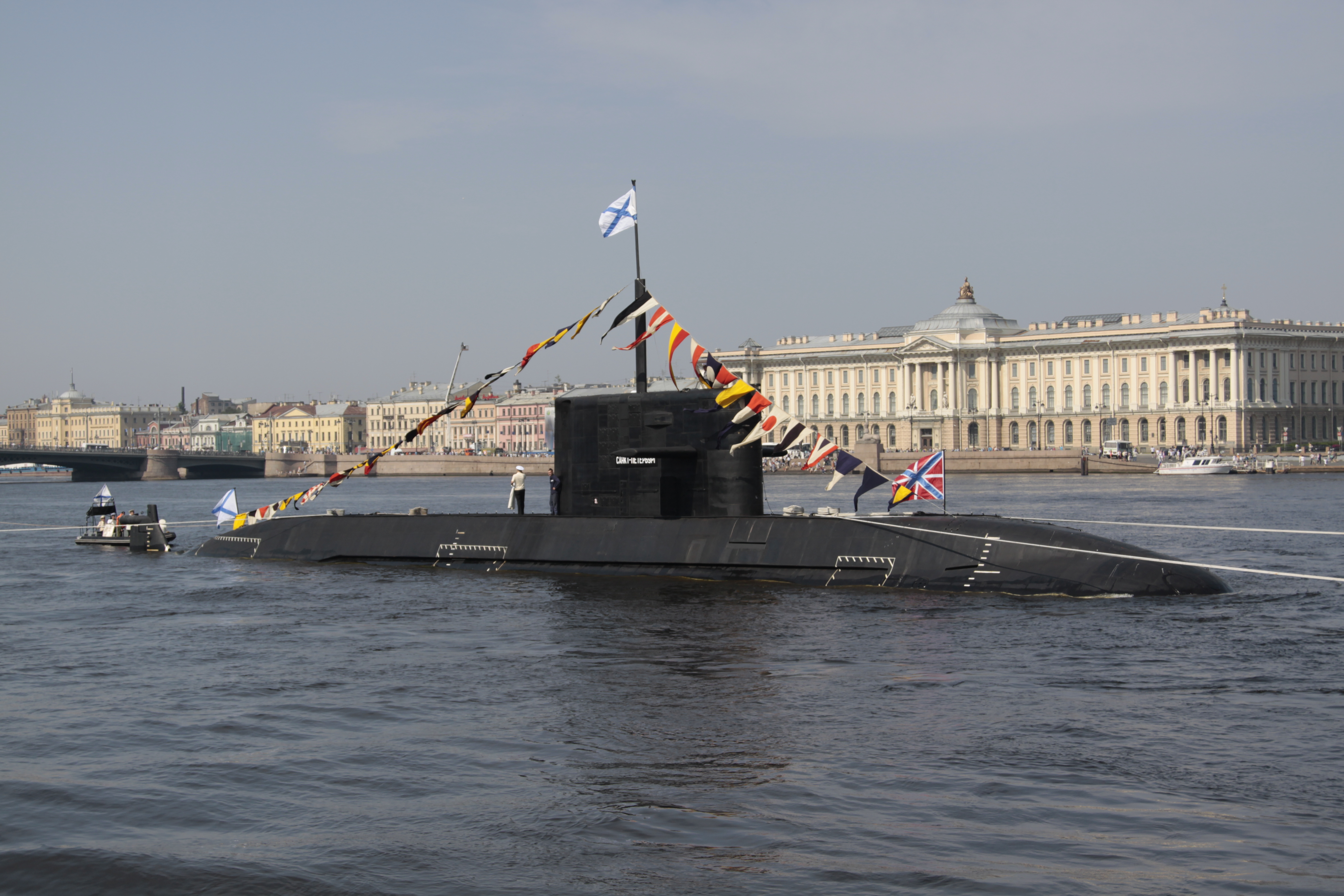
(Lada class)

=== Special-purpose submarines ===
Class	Project	Boat	Pennant No.	Commissioned	Displacement	Fleet	Note
Quantity (10)
ex Delta III	09786	Orenburg		1981 (2002)	13,700 t	All based in the Northern Fleet operational area, but under the command of the Main Directorate of Deep Sea Research (GUGI)	Active as of 2021 (Note: Mother-ship for UUVs.)
ex Delta IV	09787	Podmoskovye		1986 (2016)	18,200 t	All based in the Northern Fleet operational area, but under the command of the Main Directorate of Deep Sea Research (GUGI)	Active as of 2026 (Note: Mother-ship for UUVs.)
Sarov	20120	Sarov		2008	3,950 t	All based in the Northern Fleet operational area, but under the command of the Main Directorate of Deep Sea Research (GUGI)	Active; reported capable of deploying future Poseidon nuclear weapons (Note: Universal test platform for new designs, weapons and military equipment.)
Almaz (X-Ray)	1851	AS-23		1986	1,000 t	All based in the Northern Fleet operational area, but under the command of the Main Directorate of Deep Sea Research (GUGI)	Active; operates from "mothership" submarines
Paltus	18511	AS-21		1991	about 600 t	All based in the Northern Fleet operational area, but under the command of the Main Directorate of Deep Sea Research (GUGI)	Deep diving vessels operated from larger "mothership" submarines
Paltus	18511	AS-35		1995	about 600 t	All based in the Northern Fleet operational area, but under the command of the Main Directorate of Deep Sea Research (GUGI)	Deep diving vessels operated from larger "mothership" submarines
Kashalot	1910	AS-13		1986	about 2000 t submerged	All based in the Northern Fleet operational area, but under the command of the Main Directorate of Deep Sea Research (GUGI)	AS-15 was reportedly being readied for operations from Belgorod as of 2021
Kashalot	1910	AS-15		1991	about 2000 t submerged	All based in the Northern Fleet operational area, but under the command of the Main Directorate of Deep Sea Research (GUGI)	AS-15 was reportedly being readied for operations from Belgorod as of 2021
ex Oscar II	09852	Belgorod	K-329	8 July 2022	24,000-30,000 t submerged	All based in the Northern Fleet operational area, but under the command of the Main Directorate of Deep Sea Research (GUGI)	Extensively redesigned from Oscar-class; designed to carry the Poseidon nuclear torpedo; may also act as "mothership" for smaller special purpose submarines; deployed in the Northern Fleet operational area as of 2025, but may transfer to the Pacific Fleet in due course
Losharik	210/10831	Losharik/AS-31		2010?	2100 tonnes submerged	All based in the Northern Fleet operational area, but under the command of the Main Directorate of Deep Sea Research (GUGI)	Incapacitated after major fire July 2019; major repair undertaken from 2021; may be operational again as of 2026 (unconfirmed)

Orenburg silhouette (Delta III class)

Podmoskovye silhouette (Delta IV-class silhouette)

Sarov silhouette (Sarov class)

Losharik silhouette (Losharik class)

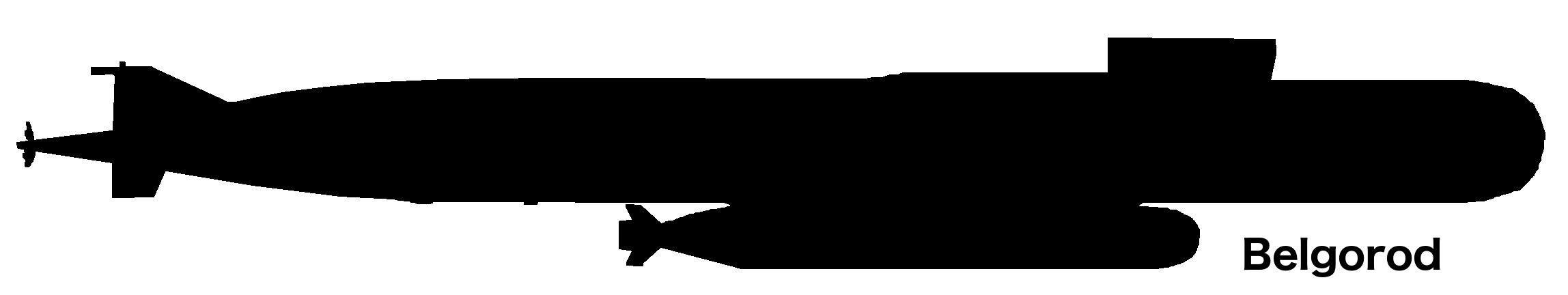
Belgorod silhouette (Oscar II class)

== Major surface combatants ==
- The aircraft carrier Admiral Kuznetsov formally remains in commission as of 2026; however, she has not sailed since 2017, has not completed repairs since suffering a major fire in 2019 and is unlikely to return to service.
- The battlecruiser Pyotr Velikiy formally remains in commission, but was deemed beyond repair and will be decommissioned after its sister ship Admiral Nakhimov returns to service. (Note: Northern Fleet flagship.)

=== Battlecruiser ===
Class	Project	Ship	Pennant No.	Commissioned	Displacement	Fleet	Homeport	Note
Quantity (1)
Kirov	11442	Admiral Nakhimov	080	1988	25,860 t	Northern Fleet	Severomorsk, 43rd Missile Ship Division	Post-refit sea trials as of 2025; expected to return to service in 2026

=== Cruisers ===
Class	Project	Ship	Pennant No.	Commissioned	Displacement	Fleet	Homeport	Note
Quantity (2)
Slava	1164	Marshal Ustinov	055	1986	11,280 t	Northern Fleet	Severomorsk, 43rd Missile Ship Division	Active as of 2026
Slava	1164	Varyag	011	1989	11,280 t	Pacific Fleet	Vladivostok, 36th Surface Ship Division	Active as of 2026 (Note: Pacific Fleet flagship.)

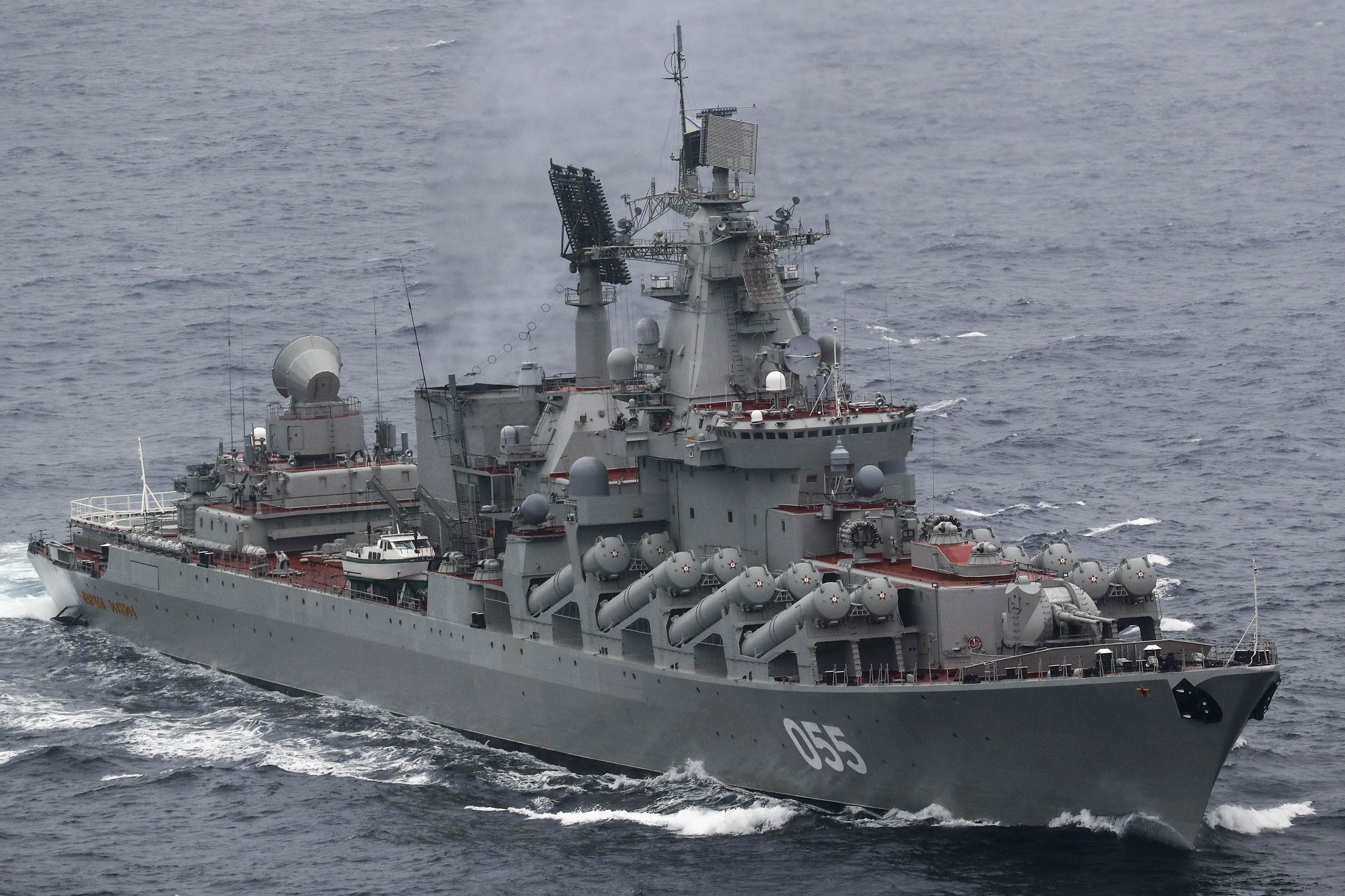
Marshal Ustinov (Slava class)

=== Destroyers ===
Class	Project	Ship	Pennant No.	Commissioned	Displacement	Fleet	Homeport	Note
Quantity (8)
Udaloy	1155	Vice-Admiral Kulakov	626	1982	7,570 t	Northern Fleet	Severomorsk, 2nd Surface Ship Division	Active as of 2025
Udaloy	1155	Marshal Shaposhnikov	543	1985	7,570 t	Pacific Fleet	Vladivostok, 36th Surface Ship Division	Active as of 2026
Udaloy	1155	Admiral Tributs	564	1985	7,570 t	Pacific Fleet	Vladivostok, 36th Surface Ship Division	Active as of 2026
Udaloy	1155	Severomorsk	619	1987	7,570 t	Northern Fleet	Severomorsk, 2nd Surface Ship Division	Active; operating regularly in the Baltic as of 2026 leading to suggestions that she may have replaced the former destroyer Nastoychivy as Baltic Fleet flagship - not officially confirmed.
Udaloy	1155	Admiral Vinogradov	572	1988	7,570 t	Pacific Fleet	Vladivostok, 36th Surface Ship Division	Undergoing refit: status unclear; had been expected to return to service in 2024-5
Udaloy	1155	Admiral Levchenko	605	1988	7,570 t	Northern Fleet	Severomorsk, 2nd Surface Ship Division	Active as of 2026
Udaloy	1155	Admiral Panteleyev	548	1991	7,570 t	Pacific Fleet	Vladivostok, 36th Surface Ship Division	Active as of 2026
Udaloy	11551	Admiral Chabanenko	650	1999	8,320 t	Northern Fleet	Severomorsk, 2nd Surface Ship Division	Inactive; future status unclear

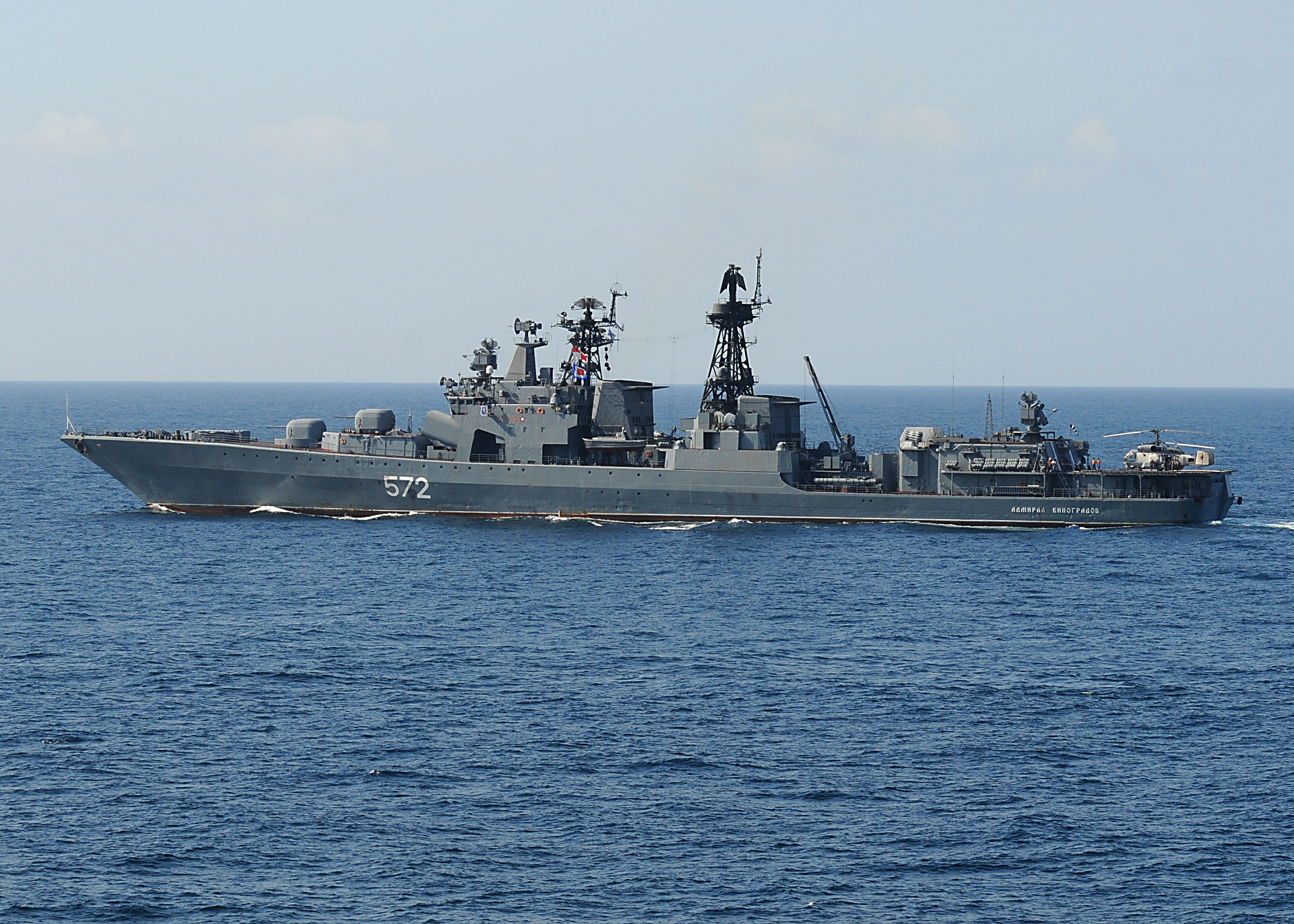
Admiral Vinogradov (Udaloy class)

Admiral Chabanenko (Udaloy II class)

=== Frigates ===
Class	Project	Ship	Pennant No.	Commissioned	Displacement	Fleet	Homeport	Note
Quantity (12)
Krivak	1135	Ladny	861	1980	3,190 t	Black Sea Fleet	Sevastopol, 30th Surface Ship Division	Active as of 2023
Krivak	1135M	Pytlivyy	868	1981	3,305 t	Black Sea Fleet	Sevastopol, 30th Surface Ship Division	Active as of 2024
Neustrashimy	11540	Neustrashimy	772	1990	4,350 t	Baltic Fleet	Baltiysk, 12th Surface Ship Division	Active as of 2026
Neustrashimy	11540	Yaroslav Mudry	777	2009	4,350 t	Baltic Fleet	Baltiysk, 12th Surface Ship Division	Reported active as of 2021
Admiral Grigorovich	11356	Admiral Grigorovich	494	2016	3,860 t	Black Sea Fleet	Sevastopol, 30th Surface Ship Division	Active as of 2026; operating in the Baltic and Mediterranean as of 2025
Admiral Grigorovich	11356	Admiral Essen	490	2016	3,860 t	Black Sea Fleet	Sevastopol, 30th Surface Ship Division	May still be active as of September 2026 though extent of operational capability is unclear; reported by Ukrainian sources to have been attacked and badly damaged in March, August, and September 2026
Admiral Grigorovich	11356	Admiral Makarov	499	2017	3,860 t	Black Sea Fleet	Sevastopol, 30th Surface Ship Division	May remain active as of September 2026 though extent of capability unclear; reports that Admiral Makarov may have been damaged in March 2026 and again in August. (Note: Black Sea Fleet flagship.)
Gepard	11661K	Tatarstan	691	2003	1,930 t	Caspian Flotilla	Makhachkala, 106th Surface Ship Brigade	Active as of 2025
Gepard	11661K	Dagestan	693	2012	1,805 t	Caspian Flotilla	Makhachkala, 106th Surface Ship Brigade	Active as of 2025
Admiral Gorshkov	22350	Admiral Flota Sovetskogo Soyuza Gorshkov	454	2018	5,400 t	Northern Fleet	Severomorsk, 43rd Missile Ship Division	Active as of 2026
Admiral Gorshkov	22350	Admiral Flota Kasatonov	461	2020	5,400 t	Northern Fleet	Severomorsk, 43rd Missile Ship Division	Active as of 2026
Admiral Gorshkov	22350	Admiral Golovko	456	2023	5,400 t	Northern Fleet	Severomorsk, 43rd Missile Ship Division	Active as of 2026

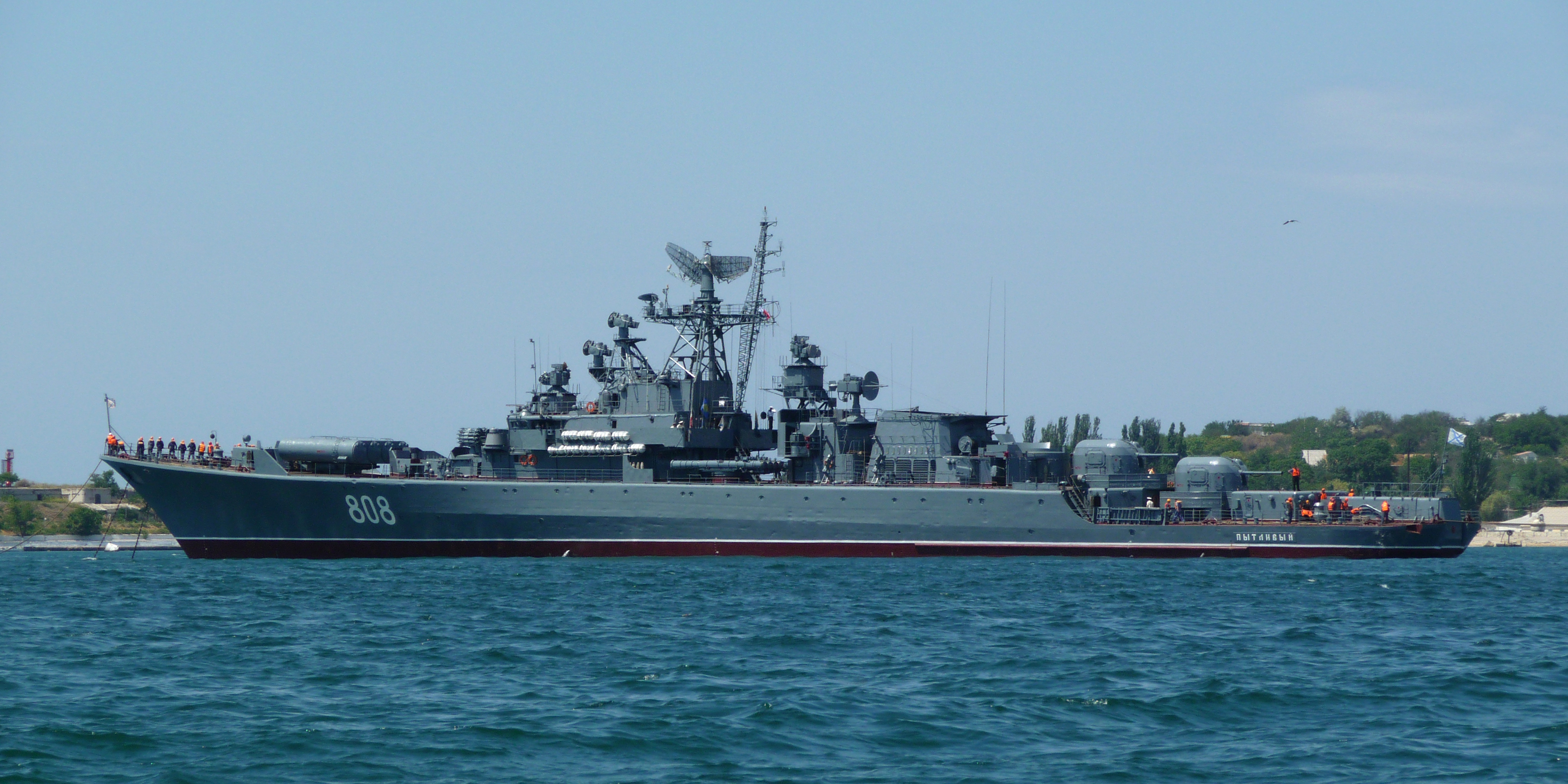
Pytlivyy (Krivak class)

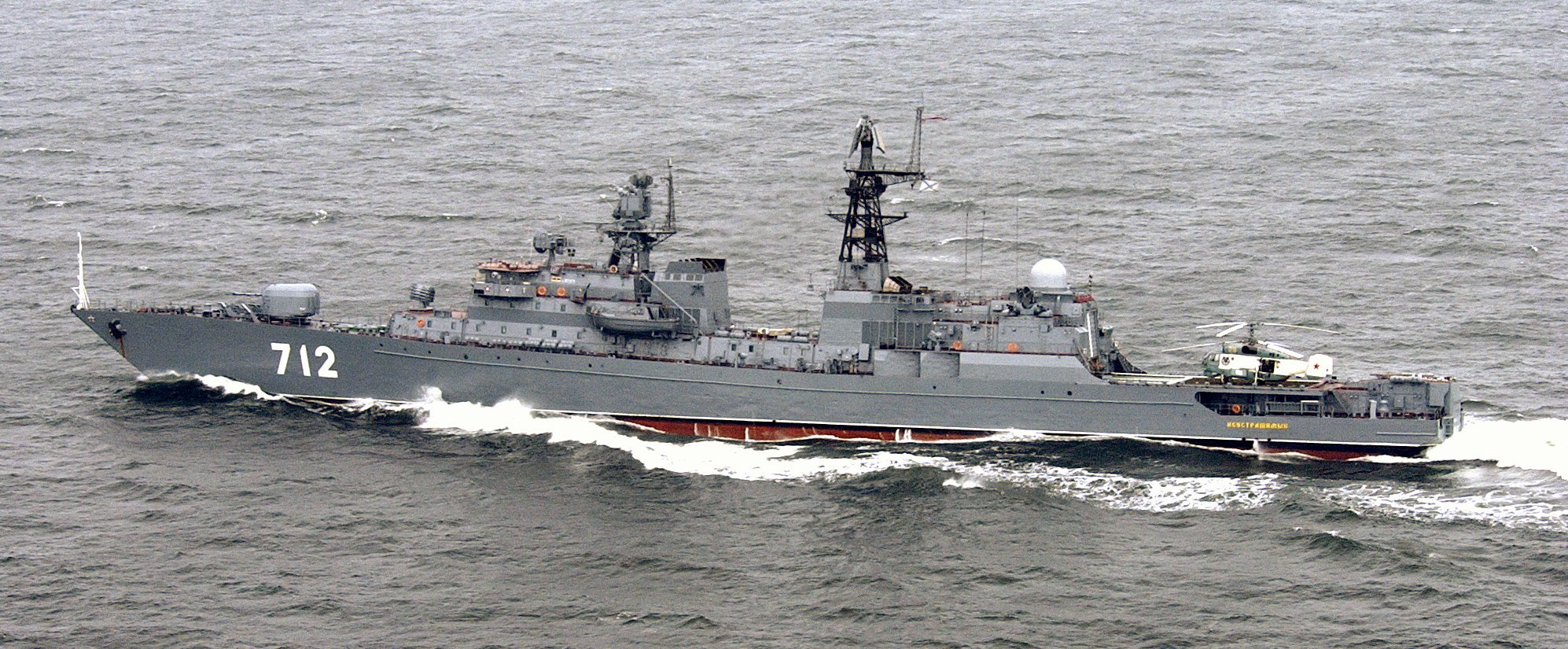
Neustrashimy (Neustrashimy class)

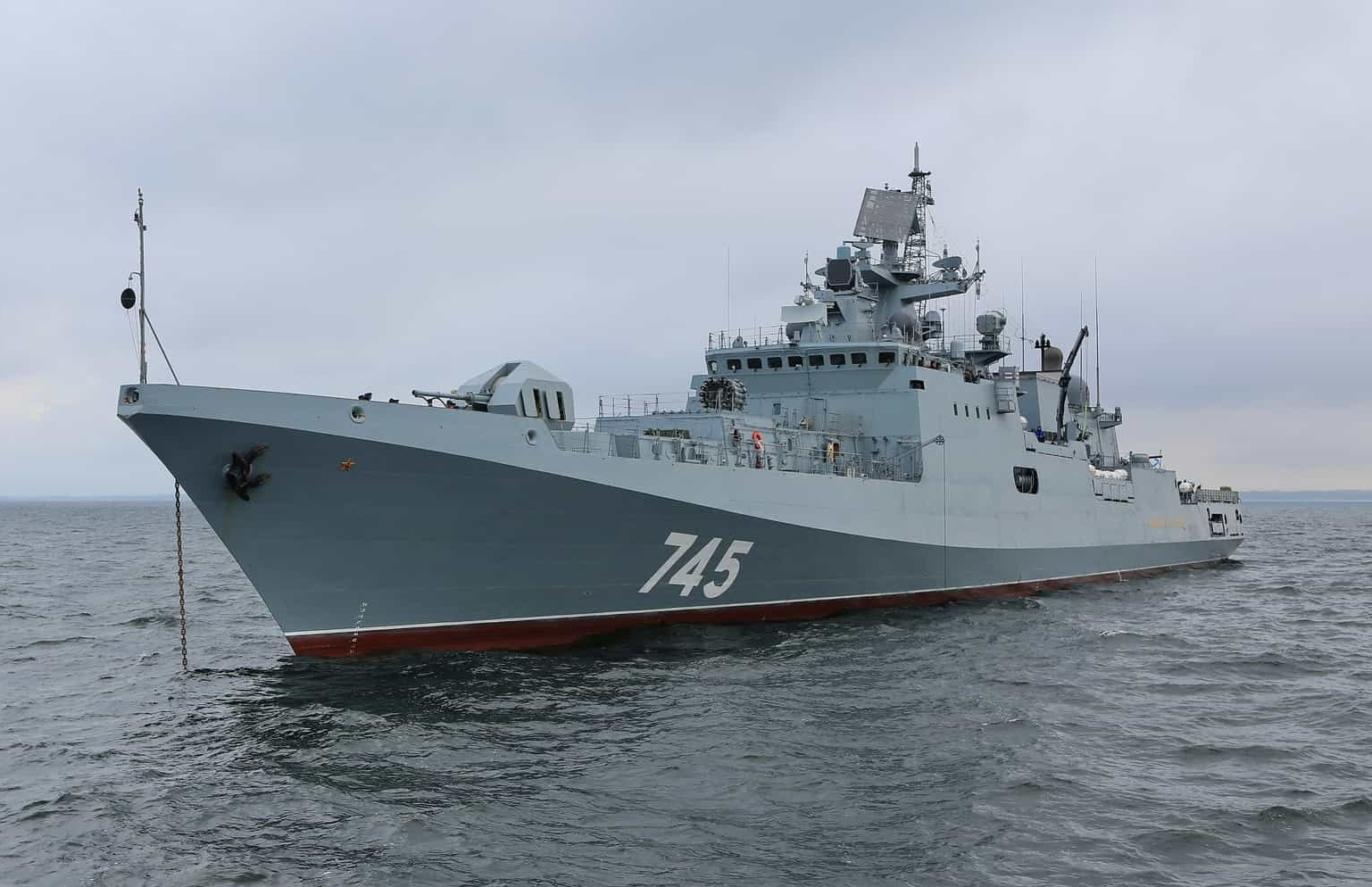
Admiral Grigorovich (Admiral Grigorovich class)

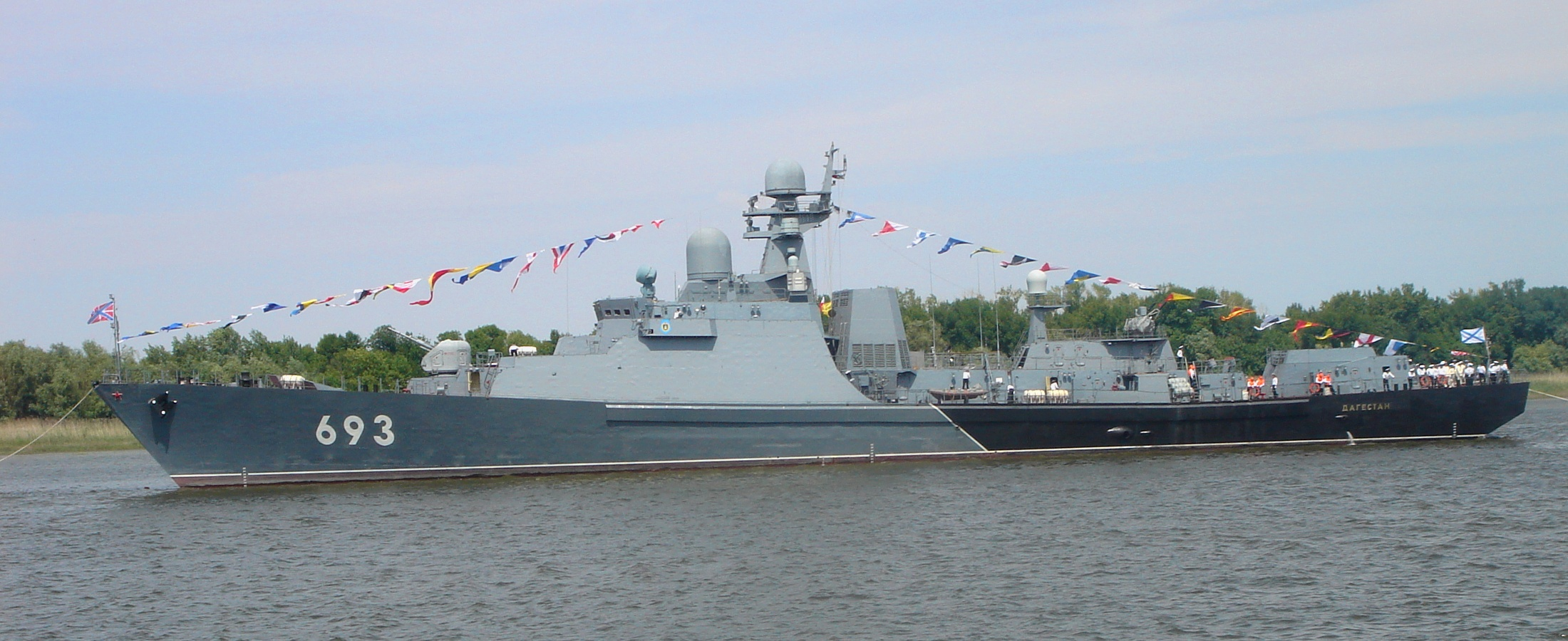
Dagestan (Gepard class)

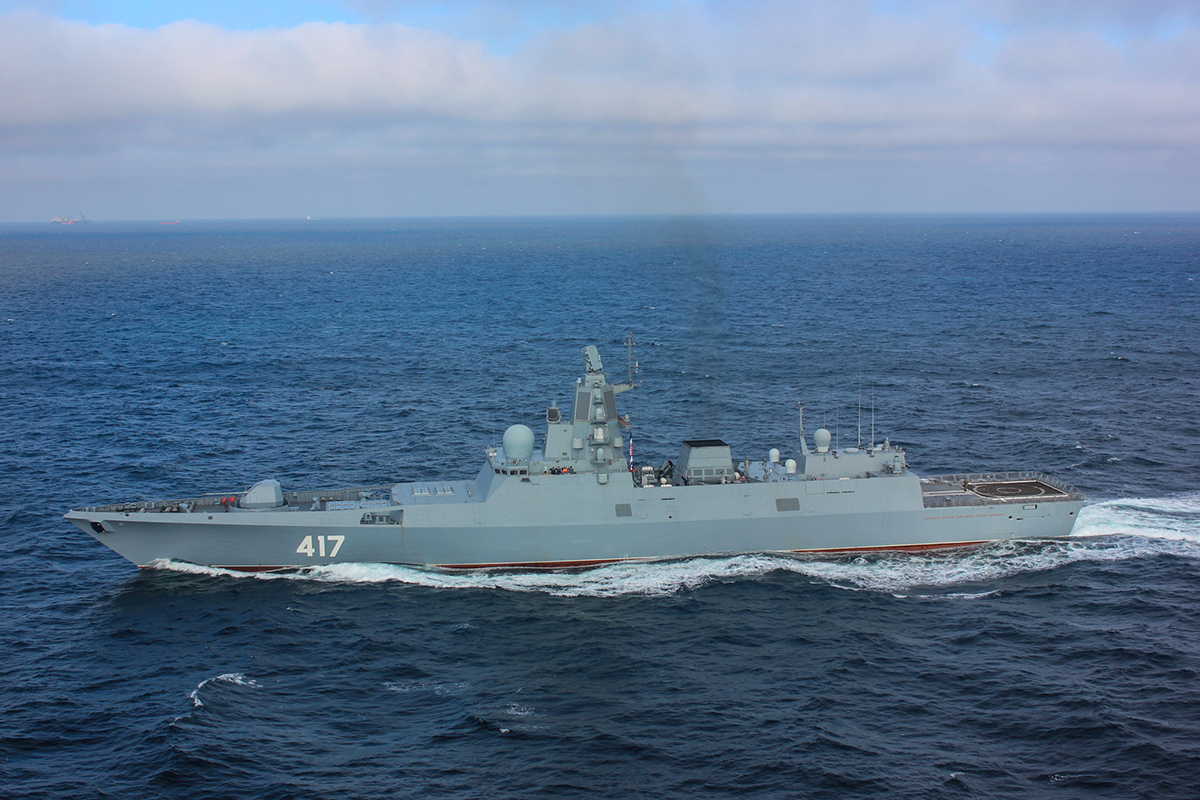
Admiral Flota Sovetskogo Soyuza Gorshkov (Admiral Gorshkov class)

== Corvettes ==
=== Multipurpose corvettes ===
(Classed as "Guard Ships" by the Russian Navy, commonly classified as large corvettes or frigates by NATO)

Class	Project	Ship	Pennant no.	Commissioned	Displacement	Fleet	Note
Quantity (10)
Steregushchiy	20380	Steregushchiy	530,550	2008	2,200 t	Baltic Fleet	Reported in modernization refit as of 2023
Steregushchiy	20380	Soobrazitelnyy	531	2011	2,200 t	Baltic Fleet	Active as of 2026
Steregushchiy	20380	Boikiy	532	2013	2,200 t	Baltic Fleet	Heavily damaged in dry dock during a reported attack by Ukrainian drones in June 2026
Steregushchiy	20380	Stoikiy	545	2014	2,200 t	Baltic Fleet	Active as of 2026
Steregushchiy	20380	Sovershennyy	333	2017	2,200 t	Pacific Fleet	Active as of 2026
Steregushchiy	20380	Gromkiy	335	2018	2,200 t	Pacific Fleet	Active as of 2026
Steregushchiy	20380	Hero of the Russian Federation Aldar Tsydenzhapov	339	2020	2,200 t	Pacific Fleet	Active as of 2025
Steregushchiy	20380	Merkuriy	535	2023	2,200 t	Black Sea Fleet	Nominally assigned to the Black Sea Fleet; owing to the Russo-Ukraine War and limitations imposed by Turkey on use of the Bosphorus Strait has been restricted in entering the Black Sea; operates as part of Russia's Mediterranean Sea Task Force and the Baltic Fleet de facto
Steregushchiy	20380	Rezkiy	343	2023	2,200 t	Pacific Fleet	Active as of 2026
Gremyashchiy	20385	Gremyashchiy	337	2020	2,500 t	Pacific Fleet	Active as of 2026

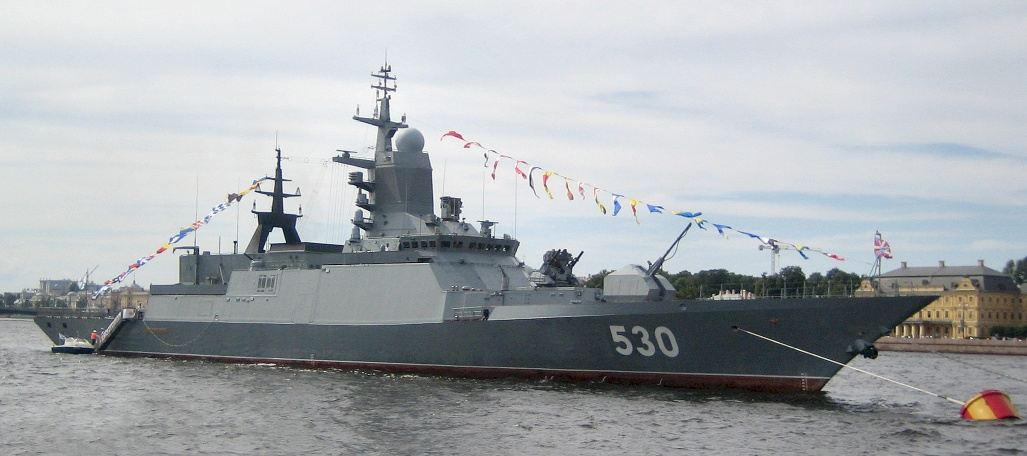
Stoykiy (Steregushchiy class)

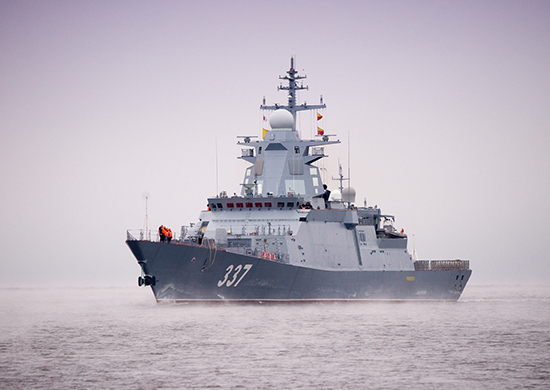
Gremyashchiy class

=== Surface warfare corvettes ===
Class	Project	Ship	Pennant no.	Commissioned	Displacement	Fleet	Note
Quantity (44)
Nanuchka	12341	Smerch	423	1984	730 t	Pacific Fleet	Active as of 2026
Nanuchka	12341	Iney	418	1987	730 t	Pacific Fleet	Status unclear; planned to decommission in 2021 but still reported active as of early 2022
Nanuchka	12341	Rassvyet	520	1988	730 t	Northern Fleet	Active as of 2026
Nanuchka	12341	Zyb'	560	1989	730 t	Baltic Fleet	
Nanuchka	12341	Geyzer	555	1989	730 t	Baltic Fleet	
Nanuchka	12341	Passat	570	1990	730 t	Baltic Fleet	Active as of 2022
Nanuchka	12341	Razliv	450?	1991	730 t	Pacific Fleet	Status unclear; planned to decommission in 2021
Tarantul
Tarantul	12411	R-60	955	1987	540 t	Black Sea Fleet	Active as of 2024
Tarantul	12411	R-261	991	1988	540 t	Pacific Fleet	Active as of 2024
Tarantul	12411	Zarechnyy (ex R-187)	855	1989	540 t	Baltic Fleet	Active as of 2026
Tarantul	12411	Naberezhnye Chelny (ex R-239)	953	1989	540 t	Black Sea Fleet	Active as of 2024
Tarantul	12411	R-297	951	1990	540 t	Pacific Fleet	
Tarantul	12411	R-298	971	1990	540 t	Pacific Fleet	Active as of 2026
Tarantul	12411	Dimitrovgrad (ex R-291)	825	1991	540 t	Baltic Fleet	Active as of 2024
Tarantul	12411	R-11	940	1991	540 t	Pacific Fleet	Active as of 2022
Tarantul	12411	R-14	924	1991	540 t	Pacific Fleet	Active as of 2026
Tarantul	12411	Morshansk (ex R-293)	874	1992	540 t	Baltic Fleet	Active as of 2025
Tarantul	12411	R-18	937	1992	540 t	Pacific Fleet	Active as of 2025
Tarantul	12411	R-19	978	1992	540 t	Pacific Fleet	Active as of 2026
Tarantul	12411	R-20	921	1993	540 t	Pacific Fleet	Active as of 2026
Tarantul	12411	R-24	946	1994	540 t	Pacific Fleet	Active as of 2026
Tarantul	12411	Chuvashiya (ex R-2)	870	2000	540 t	Baltic Fleet	Active as of 2024
Tarantul	12411	R-29	916	2003	540 t	Pacific Fleet	Active as of 2026
Bora	1239	Bora	615	1989	1,050 t	Black Sea Fleet	(Note: Missile hovercraft.) Active as of 2024
Bora	1239	Samum	616	2000	1,050 t	Black Sea Fleet	(Note: Missile hovercraft.) Reported active as of 2024
Buyan-M	21631	Grad Sviyazhsk	021,652	2014	949 t	Caspian Flotilla	Active as of 2026
Buyan-M	21631	Uglich	022,653	2014	949 t	Caspian Flotilla	Active as of 2025
Buyan-M	21631	Velikiy Ustug	023,651	2014	949 t	Caspian Flotilla	Active as of 2024
Buyan-M	21631	Zelenyy Dol	602,562	2015	949 t	Baltic Fleet	Active as of 2025
Buyan-M	21631	Serpukhov	603,563	2015	949 t	Baltic Fleet	Active as of 2025
Buyan-M	21631	Vyshniy Volochek	609	2018	949 t	Black Sea Fleet	Active; damaged in collision with civilian tanker August 2025 while undertaking evasive manoeuvres in the face of a drone attack
Buyan-M	21631	Orekhovo-Zuyevo	626	2018	949 t	Black Sea Fleet	Active; deployed in the Mediterranean/Baltic since start of Russo-Ukraine War
Buyan-M	21631	Ingushetiya	630	2019	949 t	Black Sea Fleet	Reported active as of mid-2023
Buyan-M	21631	Grayvoron	600	2021	949 t	Black Sea Fleet	Reported active as of mid-2023
Buyan-M	21631	Grad	575	2022	949 t	Baltic Fleet	Active as of 2026; reported struck by Ukrainian attack in October 2025 while transiting via Russian inland waterways from the Baltic to the Caspian; damage uncertain; back in service as of May 2026
Buyan-M	21631	Naro-Fominsk	595	2023	949 t	Baltic Fleet	Active as of 2026; reportedly damaged by Ukrainian drones in November 2026
Buyan-M	21631	Stavropol		2025	949 t	Baltic Fleet	Active as of 2026
Karakurt	22800	Mytischchi	567	2018	800 t	Baltic Fleet	Active as of 2024
Karakurt	22800	Sovetsk	577	2019	800 t	Baltic Fleet	Active as of 2024
Karakurt	22800	Odintsovo	584	2020	860 t	Baltic Fleet	Active as of 2024
Karakurt	22800	Amur	646	2024	860 t	Baltic Fleet	Transferred from the Caspian to the Baltic as of October 2025
Karakurt	22800	Tucha	606	2024	860 t	Black Sea Fleet	Deployed to the Caspian and active as of 2025
Karakurt	22800	Typhoon	?	2025	860 t	Black Sea Fleet	Deployed to the Caspian and reported active as of 2025
Karakurt	22800	Burya	578	2026	860 t	Baltic Fleet	Entered service in 2026

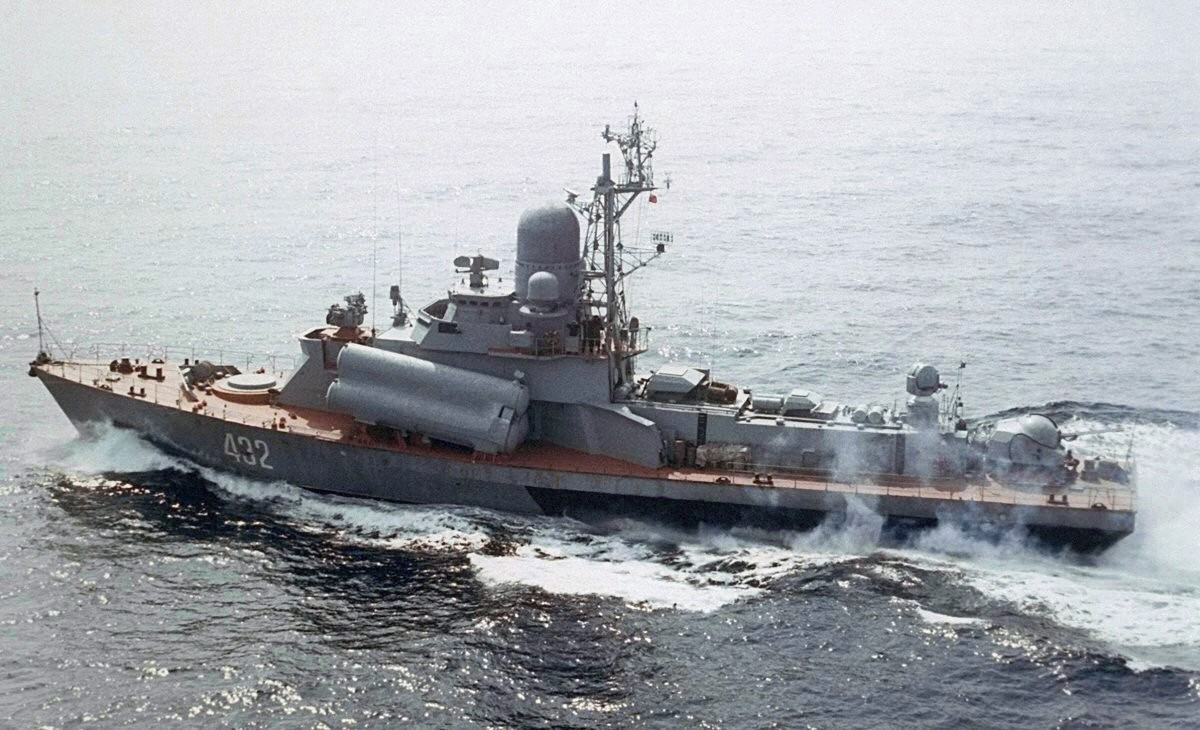
(Nanuchka class)

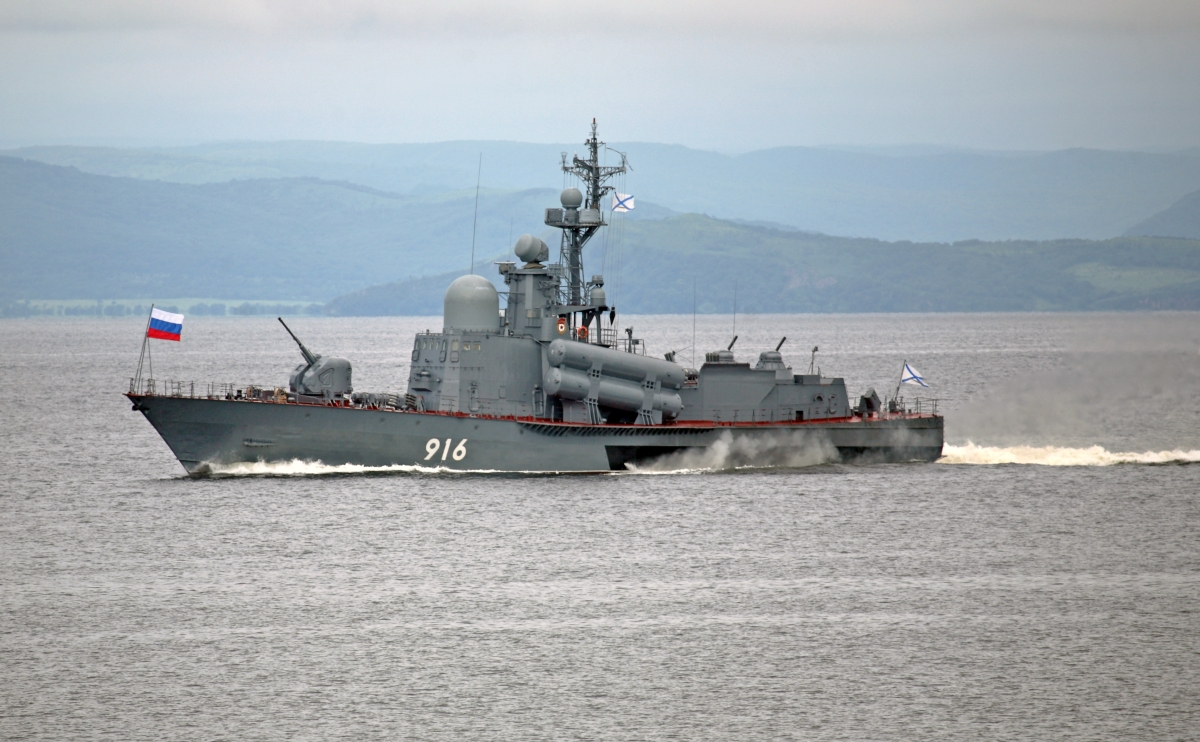
R-29 (Tarantul class)

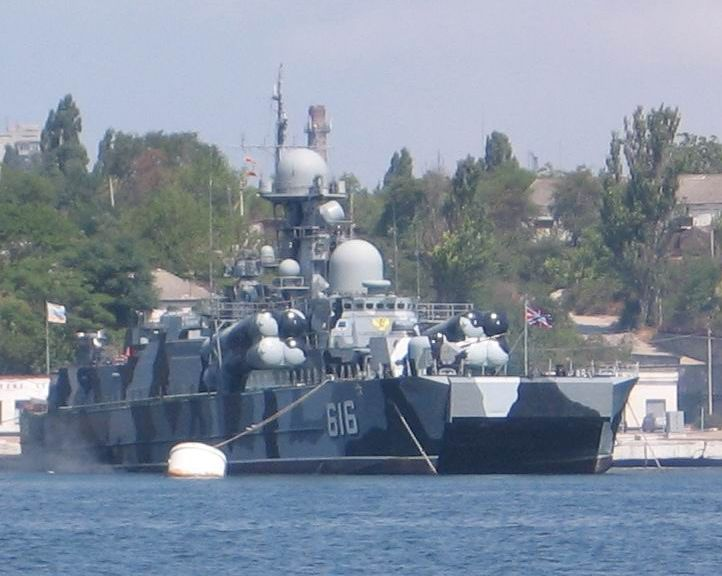
Samum (Bora class)

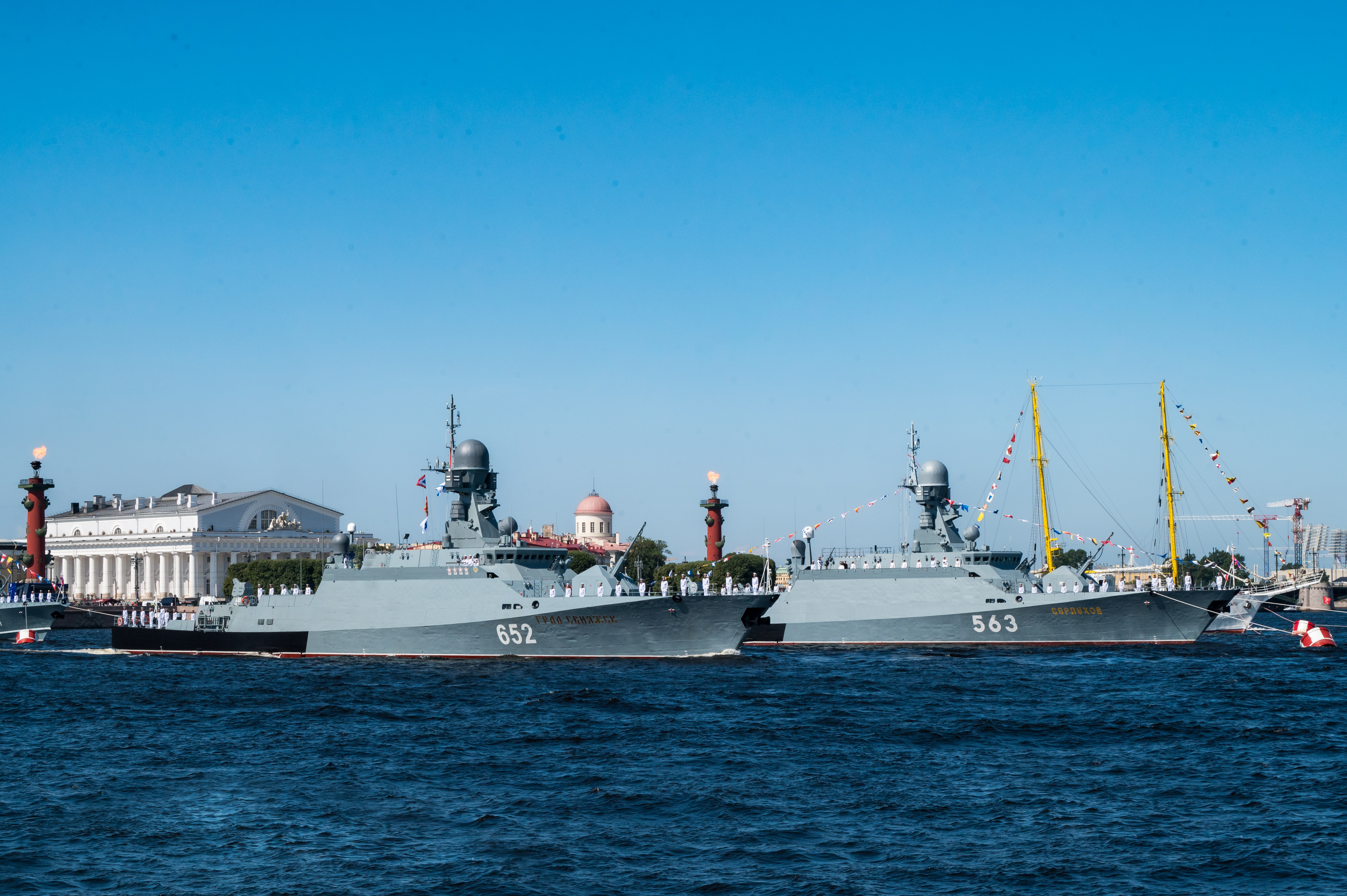
Volgodonsk (Buyan-M class)

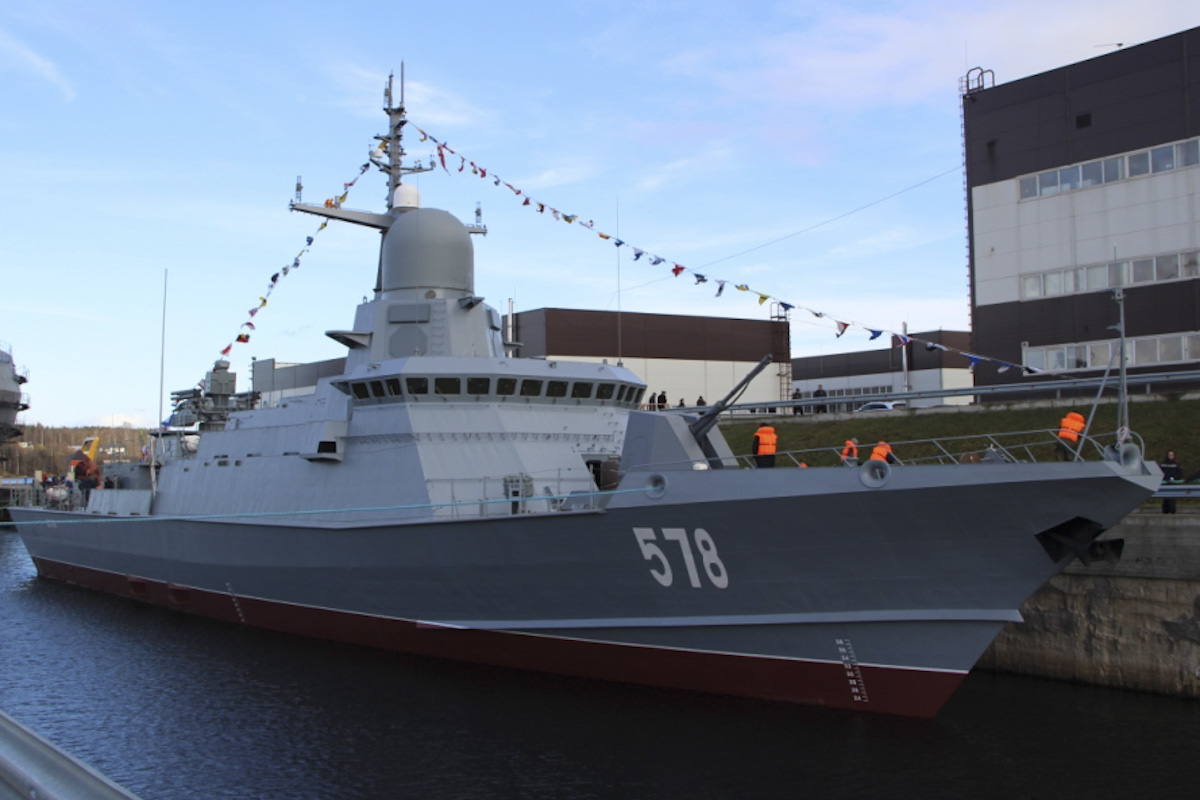
Burya (Karakurt class)

=== Anti-submarine corvettes ===
Class	Project	Ship	Pennant no.	Commissioned	Displacement	Fleet	Note
Quantity (22)
Grisha	1124	Kholmsk	369	1985	990 t	Pacific Fleet	Active in 2022
Grisha	1124M	Muromets	064	1982	1,055 t	Black Sea Fleet	All reported active at the start of the Russo-Ukraine War; Muromets reported active and receiving new camouflage as of 2023 & two reported relocated from Crimea to the eastern Black Sea in 2024; one vessel may have been damaged by fire (specific ship, cause & extent unknown) in November 2025
Grisha	1124M	Suzdalets	071	1983	1,055 t	Black Sea Fleet	All reported active at the start of the Russo-Ukraine War; Muromets reported active and receiving new camouflage as of 2023 & two reported relocated from Crimea to the eastern Black Sea in 2024; one vessel may have been damaged by fire (specific ship, cause & extent unknown) in November 2025
Grisha	1124M	Kasimov	055	1986	1,055 t	Black Sea Fleet	All reported active at the start of the Russo-Ukraine War; Muromets reported active and receiving new camouflage as of 2023 & two reported relocated from Crimea to the eastern Black Sea in 2024; one vessel may have been damaged by fire (specific ship, cause & extent unknown) in November 2025
Grisha	1124M	Yeysk	054	1989	1,055 t	Black Sea Fleet	All reported active at the start of the Russo-Ukraine War; Muromets reported active and receiving new camouflage as of 2023 & two reported relocated from Crimea to the eastern Black Sea in 2024; one vessel may have been damaged by fire (specific ship, cause & extent unknown) in November 2025
Grisha	1124M	Brest	199	1988	1,055 t	Northern Fleet	Active as of 2025
Grisha	1124M	Yunga	113	1989	1,055 t	Northern Fleet	Active as of 2026
Grisha	1124M	Naryan-Mar	138	1990	1,055 t	Northern Fleet	Active as of 2024
Grisha	1124M	Sovetskaya Gavan	350	1990	1,055 t	Pacific Fleet	Active as of 2024
Grisha	1124M	MPK-107	332	1990	1,055 t	Pacific Fleet	Active as of 2025
Grisha	1124M	Onega	164	1990	1,055 t	Northern Fleet	Active as of 2025
Grisha	1124M	Metel	323	1990	1,055 t	Pacific Fleet	Active as of 2024
Grisha	1124M	MPK-82	375	1991	1,055 t	Pacific Fleet	Active as of 2026
Grisha	1124M	Ust-Ilimsk	362	1991	1,055 t	Pacific Fleet	Active as of 2025
Grisha	1124M	Monchegorsk	190	1993	1,055 t	Northern Fleet	Status unclear
Grisha	1124M	Snezhnogorsk	196	1994	1,055 t	Northern Fleet	Active as of 2026
Parchim	1331M	Urengoy	304	1986	950 t	Baltic Fleet	Active as of 2025
Parchim	1331M	Kazanets	311	1986	950 t	Baltic Fleet	Active as of 2025
Parchim	1331M	Zelenodolsk	308	1987	950 t	Baltic Fleet	Active as of 2025
Parchim	1331M	Aleksin	218	1989	950 t	Baltic Fleet	Active as of 2026
Parchim	1331M	Kabardino-Balkariya	243	1989	950 t	Baltic Fleet	Active as of 2026
Parchim	1331M	Kalmykiya	232	1990	950 t	Baltic Fleet	

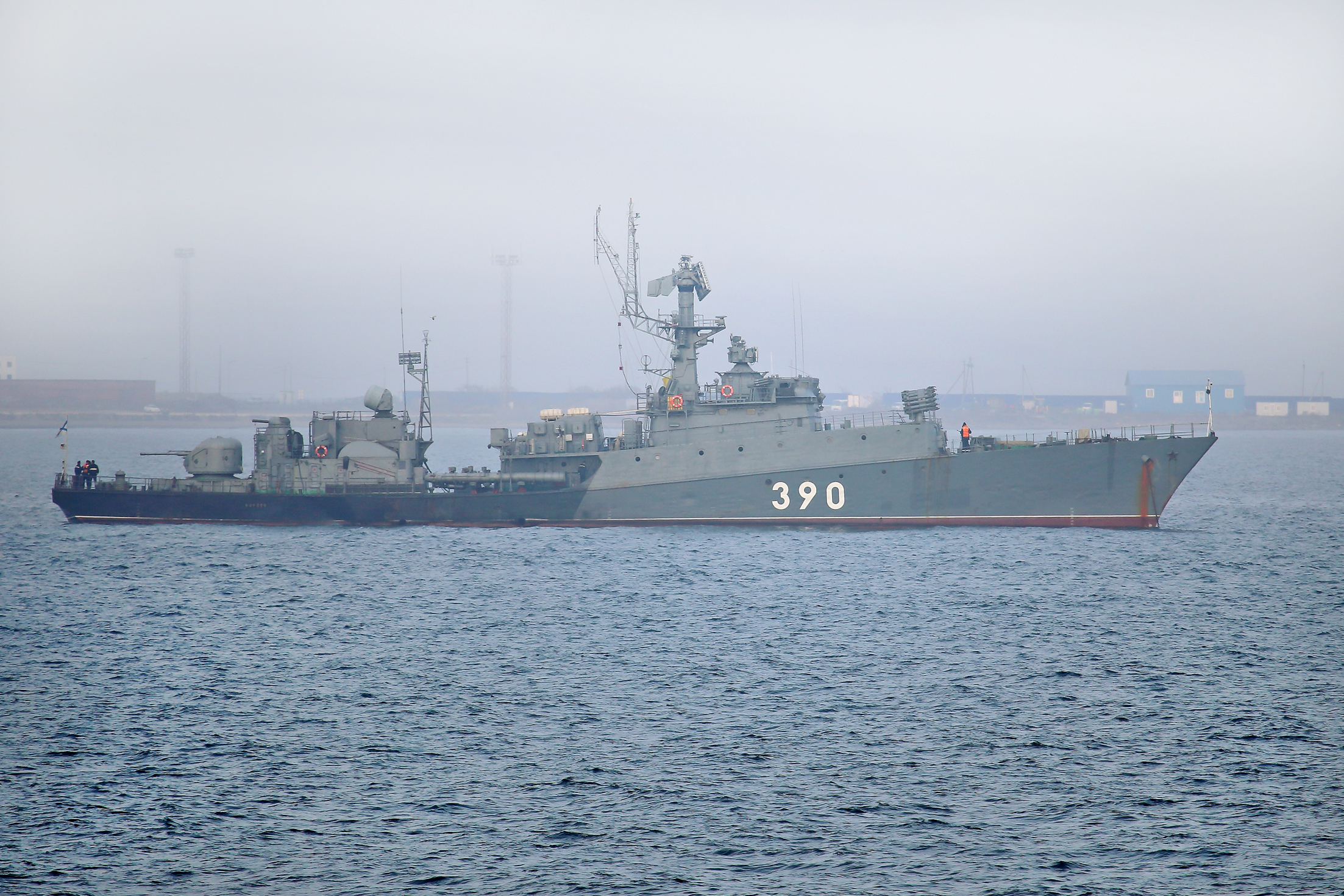
Koryeyets (Grisha class)

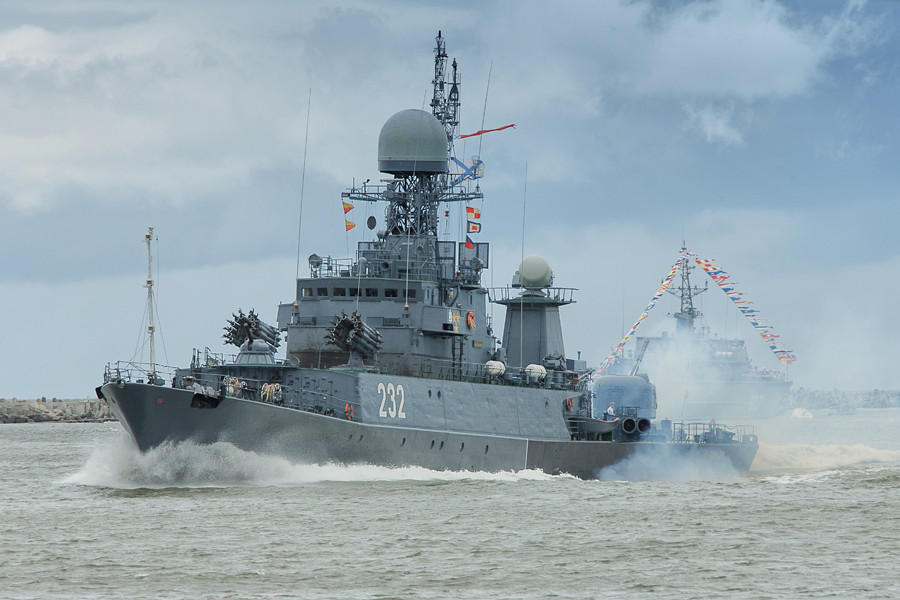
Kalmykiya (Parchim class)

=== Artillery corvettes ===
Class	Project	Ship	Pennant no.	Commissioned	Displacement	Fleet	Note
Quantity (3)
Buyan	21630	Astrakhan	012,017	2006	500 t	Caspian Flotilla	Active as of 2024
Buyan	21630	Volgodonsk	014,018	2012	500 t	Caspian Flotilla	Active as of 2024
Buyan	21630	Makhachkala	015,020	2012	500 t	Caspian Flotilla	

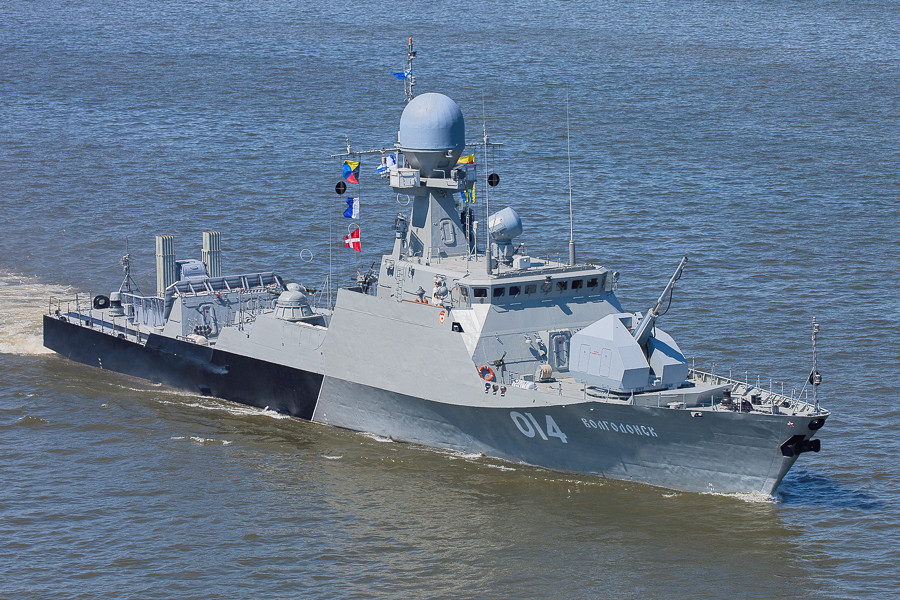
Volgodonsk (Buyan class)

== Amphibious vessels ==
=== Landing ships ===
Class	Project	Ship	Pennant no.	Commissioned	Displacement	Fleet	Note
Quantity (17)
Tapir	1171	Orsk	148	1968	4,946 t	Black Sea Fleet	Active as of 2022 at the start of the Russo-Ukraine War
Tapir	1171	Nikolai Vilkov	081	1974	4,946 t	Pacific Fleet	Active as of 2026
Tapir	1171	Nikolai Filchenkov	152	1975	4,946 t	Black Sea Fleet	Reported active; may have been damaged in drone attack in April 2026
Ropucha	775	Olenegorsky Gornyak	012	1976	4,080 t	Northern Fleet	Deployed to the Black Sea and participating in the War in Ukraine; reportedly seriously damaged in 2023
Ropucha	775	Kondopoga	027	1976	4,080 t	Northern Fleet	Active as of 2026
Ropucha	775	Aleksandr Otrakovsky	031	1978	4,080 t	Northern Fleet	Active as of 2026
Ropucha	775	Oslyabya	066	1981	4,080 t	Pacific Fleet	Active as of 2026
Ropucha	775	Admiral Nevelskoy	055	1982	4,080 t	Pacific Fleet	Active as of 2025
Ropucha	775	Kaliningrad	102	1984	4,080 t	Baltic Fleet	Deployed to the Black Sea and participating in the Russo-Ukraine War as of 2022
Ropucha	775	Georgiy Pobedonosets	016	1985	4,080 t	Northern Fleet	Active; deployed to the Black Sea and participating in the War in Ukraine
Ropucha	775	Aleksandr Shabalin	110	1985	4,080 t	Baltic Fleet	Active as of 2026; refit 2020-24
Ropucha	775	Yamal	156	1988	4,080 t	Black Sea Fleet	Damaged in 2024 and possibly again in 2026
Ropucha	775M	Azov	151	1990	4,080 t	Black Sea Fleet	Damaged in 2024; reported as both awaiting repairs or damage minimal
Ropucha	775M	Peresvet	077	1991	4,080 t	Pacific Fleet	Active as of 2024
Ropucha	775M	Korolyov	130	1991	4,080 t	Baltic Fleet	Deployed to the Black Sea and participating in the Russo-Ukraine War as of 2022
Ivan Gren	11711	Ivan Gren	135	2018	6,600 t	Northern Fleet	Active as of 2025
Ivan Gren	11711	Pyotr Morgunov	117	2020	6,600 t	Northern Fleet	Active; deployed to the Black Sea and participating in the War in Ukraine

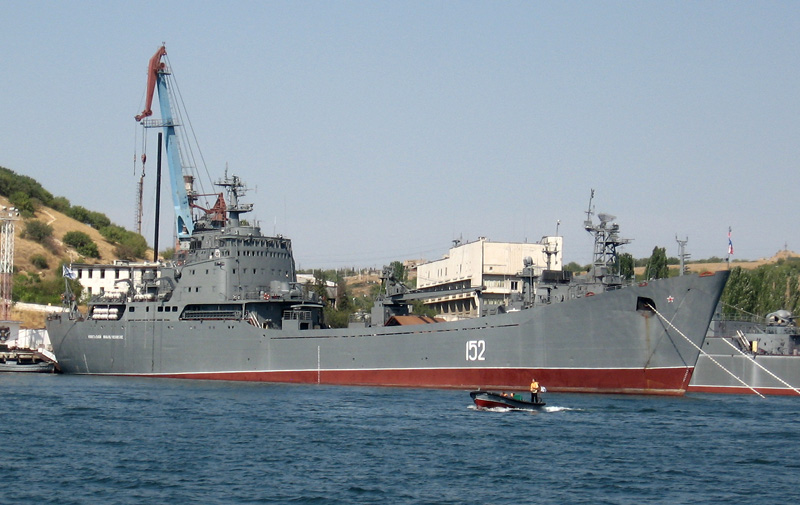
(Alligator class)

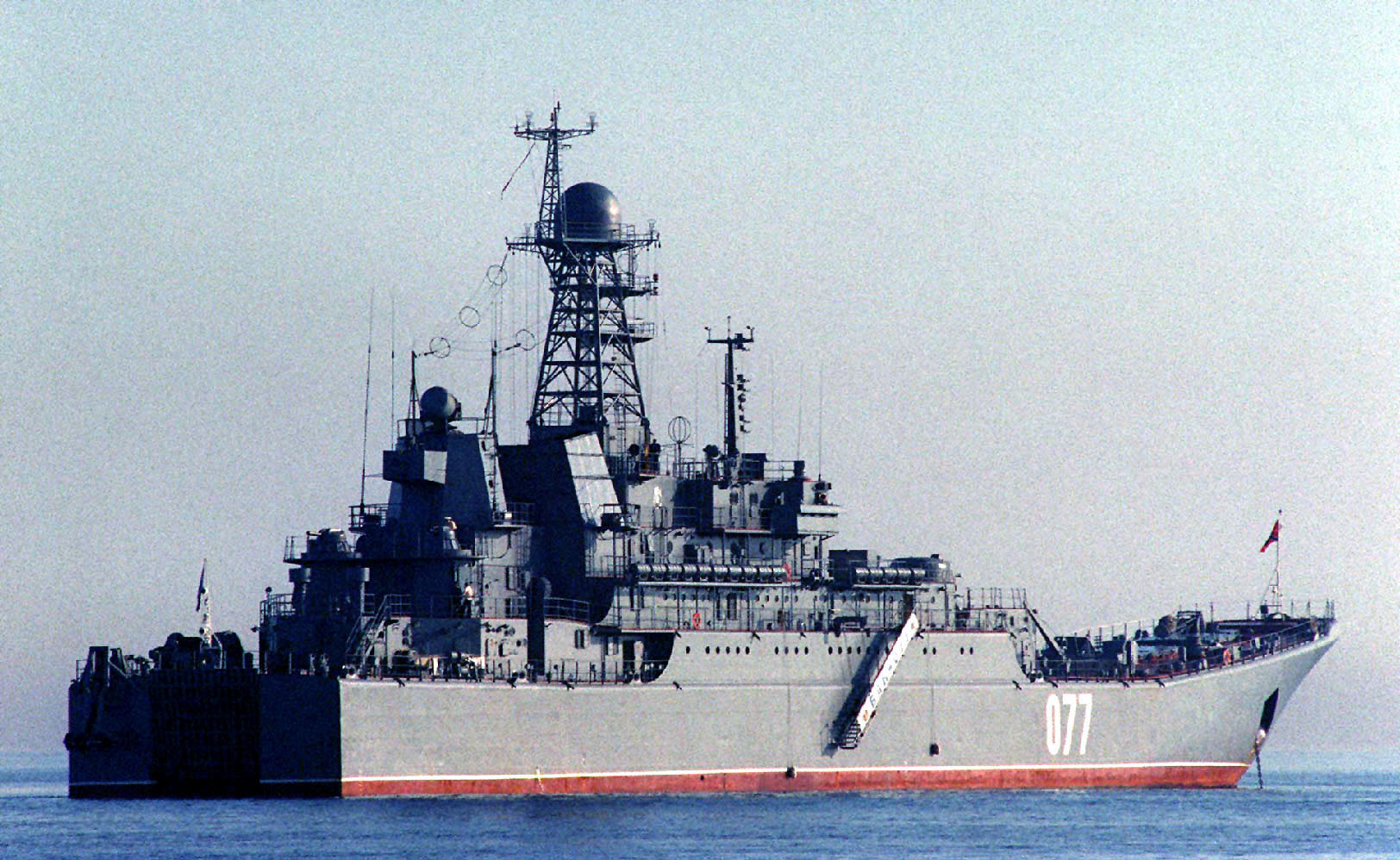
(Ropucha class)

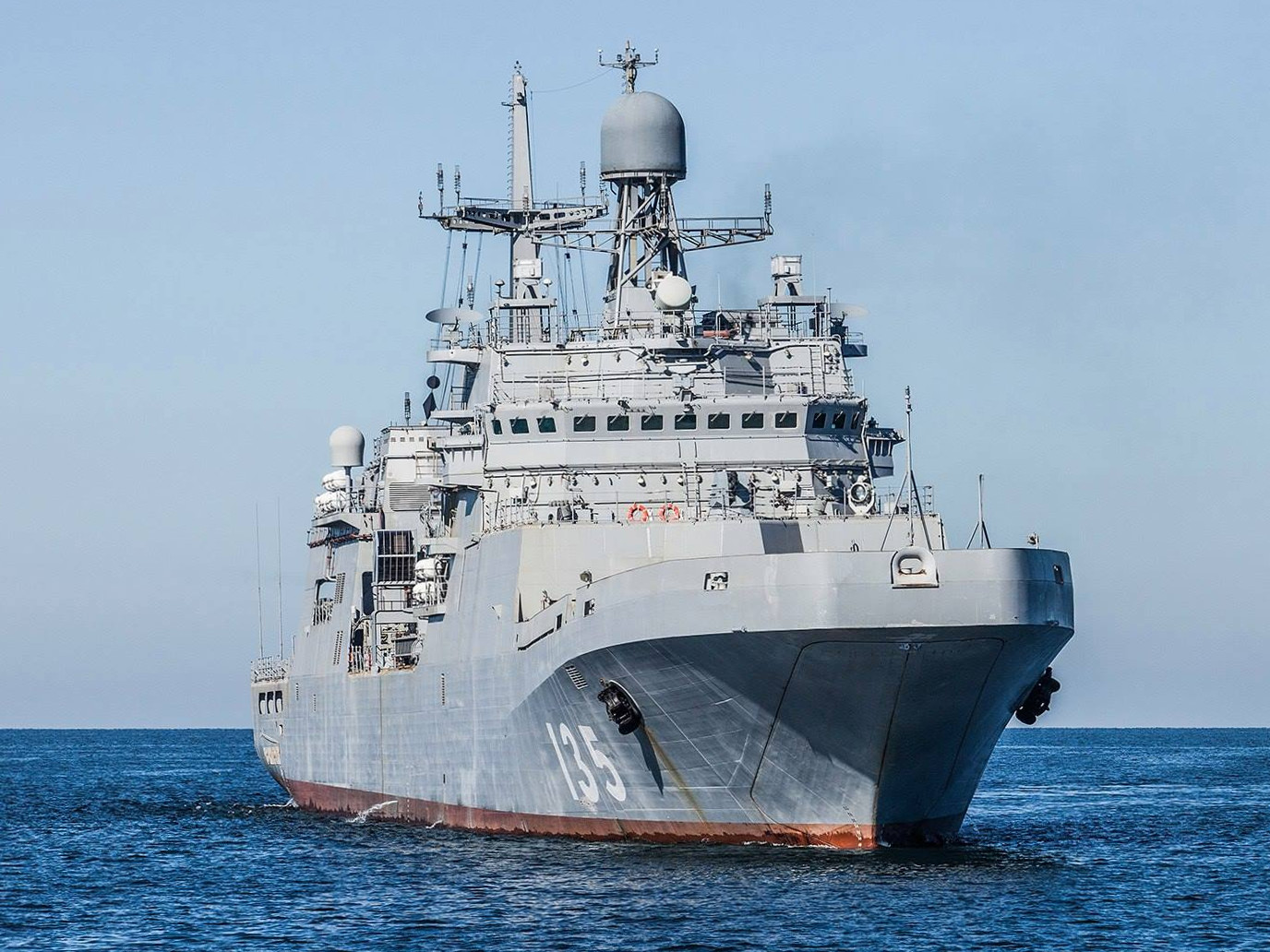
(Ivan Gren class)

=== Landing craft ===
Class	Project	Ship	Pennant no.	Commissioned	Displacement	Fleet	Note
Quantity (>50)
Zubr	12322	Evgeniy Kocheshkov	770	1990	555 t	Baltic Fleet	Active as of 2025
Zubr	12322	Mordoviya	782	1991	555 t	Baltic Fleet	Active as of 2025
Serna	11770	D-67		1994	100 t	Baltic Fleet	
Serna	11770	D-156		1999	100 t	Caspian Flotilla	
Serna	11770	D-131		2002	100 t	Caspian Flotilla	
Serna	11770	D-172		2005	100 t	Caspian Flotilla	
Serna	11770	Alexey Sukhanov		2008	100 t	Caspian Flotilla	
Serna	11770	D-144?		2008	100 t	Black Sea Fleet	Several Serna-class craft reported destroyed; more have likely been deployed to the Black Sea
Serna	11770	D-199?		2014	100 t	Black Sea Fleet	Several Serna-class craft reported destroyed; more have likely been deployed to the Black Sea
Serna	11770	Alexey Barinov		2009	100 t	Baltic Fleet	
Serna	11770	Ivan Pasko		2009	100 t	Baltic Fleet	
Serna	11770	D-107		2010	100 t	Pacific Fleet	
Serna	11770	Zaur Omarov?		2013	100 t	Caspian Flotilla	
Serna	11770	D-178 Yury Kukushkin?		2012	100 t	Caspian Flotilla	
Dyugon	21820	Ataman Platov		2010	280 t	Caspian Flotilla	
Dyugon	21820	Denis Davydov		2014	280 t	Baltic Fleet	
Dyugon	21820	Ivan Kartsov		2015	280 t	Pacific Fleet	
Dyugon	21820	Lieutenant Rimskiy-Korsakov		2014	280 t	Baltic Fleet?	
Dyugon	21820	Midshipman Lermontov		2014	280 t	Baltic Fleet?	
Ondatra	1176	D-704		1976	90 t	Pacific Fleet	
Ondatra	1176	D-70		1981	90 t	Pacific Fleet	
Ondatra	1176	D-464		1985	90 t	Northern Fleet	
Ondatra	1176	D-465		1986	90 t	Baltic Fleet	
Ondatra	1176	D-325		1991	90 t	Baltic Fleet	
Ondatra	1176	D-148		1993	90 t	Northern Fleet	
Ondatra	1176	D-365		1994	90 t	Baltic Fleet	
Ondatra	1176	D-182		1996	90 t	Northern Fleet	
Ondatra	1176	D-185		2000	90 t	Caspian Flotilla	
Ondatra	1176	D-163		2005	90 t	Northern Fleet	
Ondatra	1176	D-57		2007	90 t	Pacific Fleet	
Ondatra	1176	Svatovo?		1979?	90 t	Black Sea Fleet?	ex-D-305 active with the Ukrainian Navy from 1998; possibly captured by Russia, March 2022
BK-16	02510	D-296 Vladislav Dorokhin		2015	22 t	Black Sea Fleet	Several BK-16s reported destroyed (one may have been D-310); Production/deployment of additional BK-16s reported as a priority for the Black Sea Fleet
BK-16	02510	TDK-491?		2019?	22 t	Black Sea Fleet	Several BK-16s reported destroyed (one may have been D-310); Production/deployment of additional BK-16s reported as a priority for the Black Sea Fleet
BK-16	02510	D-212?		2024	22 t	Black Sea Fleet	Several BK-16s reported destroyed (one may have been D-310); Production/deployment of additional BK-16s reported as a priority for the Black Sea Fleet
BK-16	02510	D-309		2018	22 t	Black Sea Fleet	Several BK-16s reported destroyed (one may have been D-310); Production/deployment of additional BK-16s reported as a priority for the Black Sea Fleet
BK-16	02510	D-310?		2021	22 t	Black Sea Fleet	Several BK-16s reported destroyed (one may have been D-310); Production/deployment of additional BK-16s reported as a priority for the Black Sea Fleet
BK-16	02510	D-311		2021	22 t	Black Sea Fleet	Several BK-16s reported destroyed (one may have been D-310); Production/deployment of additional BK-16s reported as a priority for the Black Sea Fleet
BK-16	02510	TDK-490		2019?	22 t	Black Sea Fleet	Several BK-16s reported destroyed (one may have been D-310); Production/deployment of additional BK-16s reported as a priority for the Black Sea Fleet
BK-16	02510	TDK-492		2019	22 t	Black Sea Fleet	Several BK-16s reported destroyed (one may have been D-310); Production/deployment of additional BK-16s reported as a priority for the Black Sea Fleet
BK-16	02510	TDK-493		2019	22 t	Black Sea Fleet	Several BK-16s reported destroyed (one may have been D-310); Production/deployment of additional BK-16s reported as a priority for the Black Sea Fleet
BK-16	02510	D-308		2018	22 t	Northern Fleet	
BK-16	02510	D-2110		2018	22 t	Northern Fleet	
BK-16	02510	D-321		2021	22 t	Northern Fleet	
BK-16	02510	RVK-703		2019?	22 t	Northern Fleet	
BK-16	02510	D-315		2020	22 t	Baltic Fleet	Another vessel of the class may originally have been built for the Baltic Fleet
BK-18	02511			2017	25 t	Black Sea Fleet	Status unknown
BK-18	02511			2017	25 t	Black Sea Fleet	Status unknown
BK-10/M/M1/D	02450	c. 14+ units		Since 2013	6-12 t	Black Sea Fleet	Built/building for Black Sea Fleet

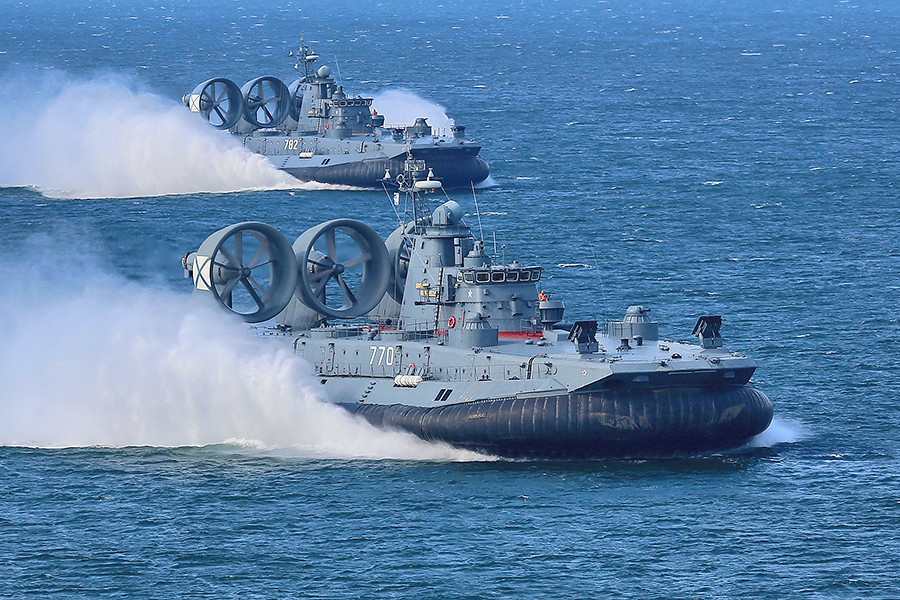
(Zubr class)

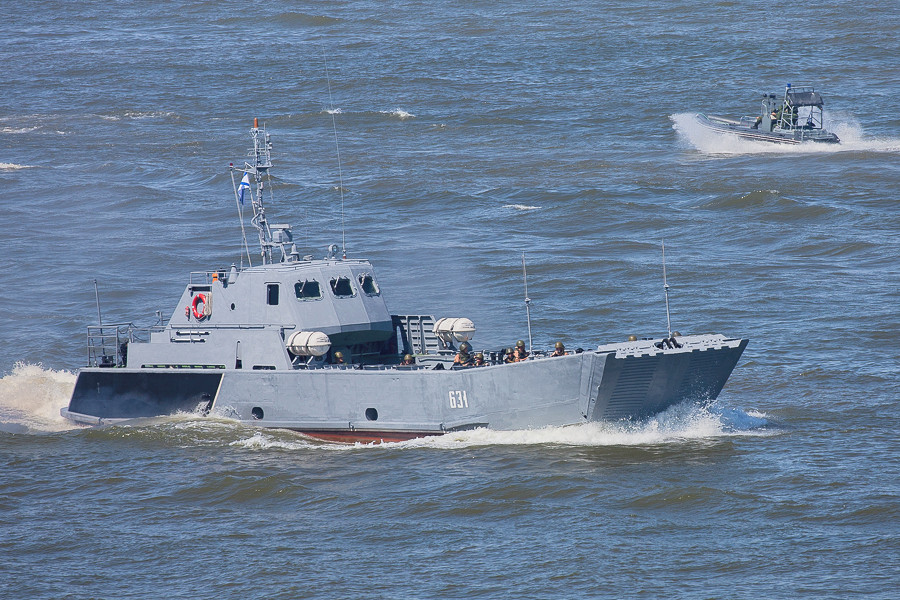
(Serna class)

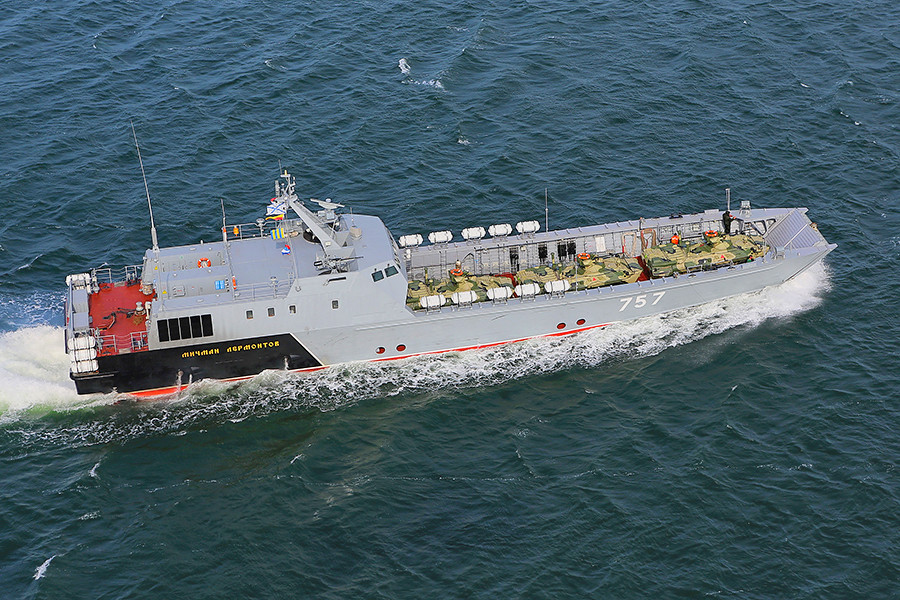
(Dyugon class)

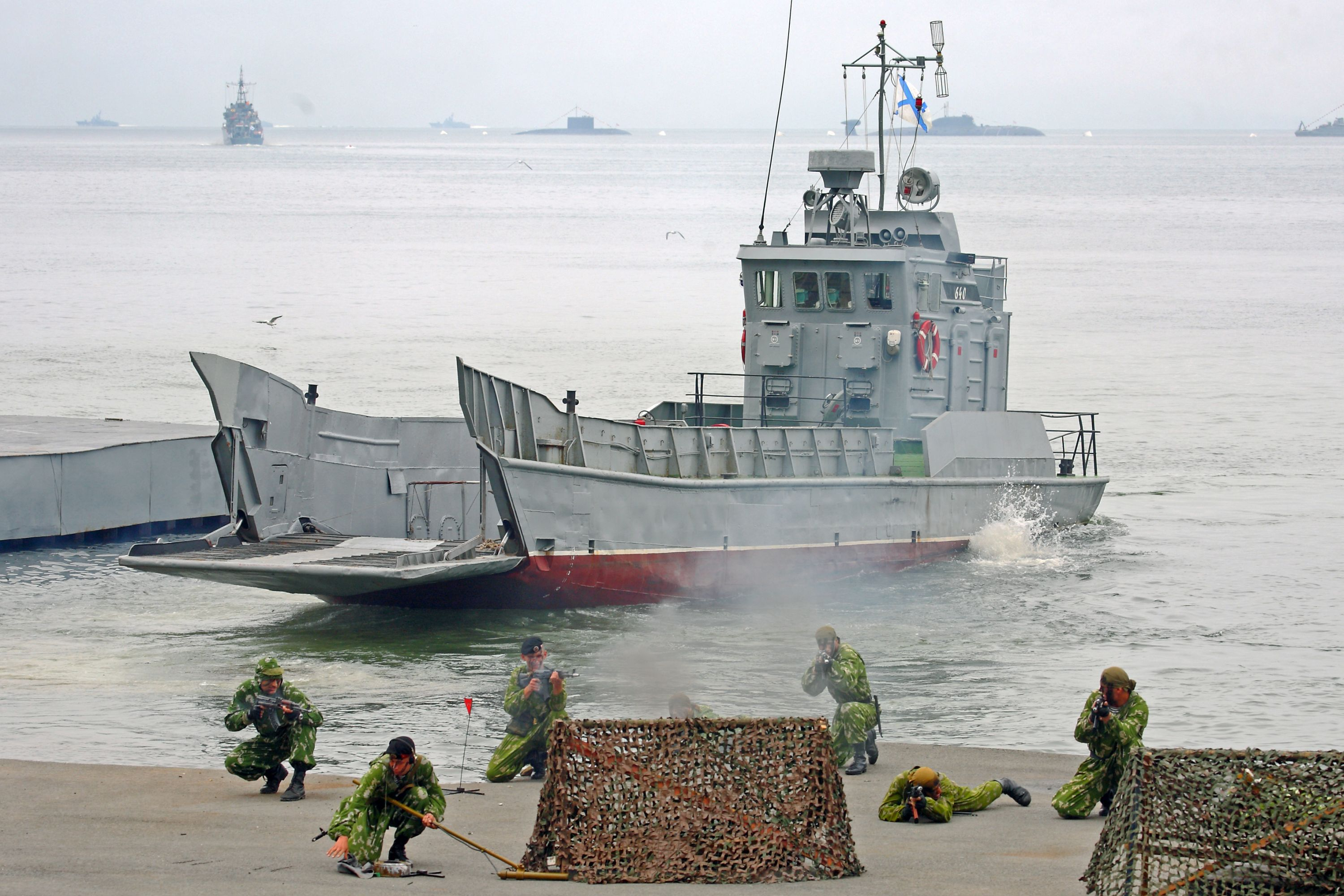
(Ondatra class)

(BK-16 class)

== Patrol ships and boats ==
=== Offshore patrol vessels ===
Class	Project	Ship	Pennant no.	Commissioned	Displacement	Fleet	Note
Quantity (5)
Project 22160	22160	Vasily Bykov	368	2018	1,500 t	Black Sea Fleet	Active as of 2023; claimed attacked in Ukrainian drone strike in August 2026; degree of damage uncertain
Project 22160	22160	Dmitry Rogachev	375	2019	1,500 t	Black Sea Fleet	Active as of the start of the Russo-Ukraine war
Project 22160	22160	Pavel Derzhavin	363	2020	1,500 t	Black Sea Fleet	Active as of 2024
Project 22160	22160	Viktor Velikiy	417	2025	1,500 t	Black Sea Fleet	Active and operating in the Baltic/Mediterranean as of 2026
Project 23550	23550	Ivan Papanin	400	2025	6,800 t	Northern Fleet	Active as of 2026

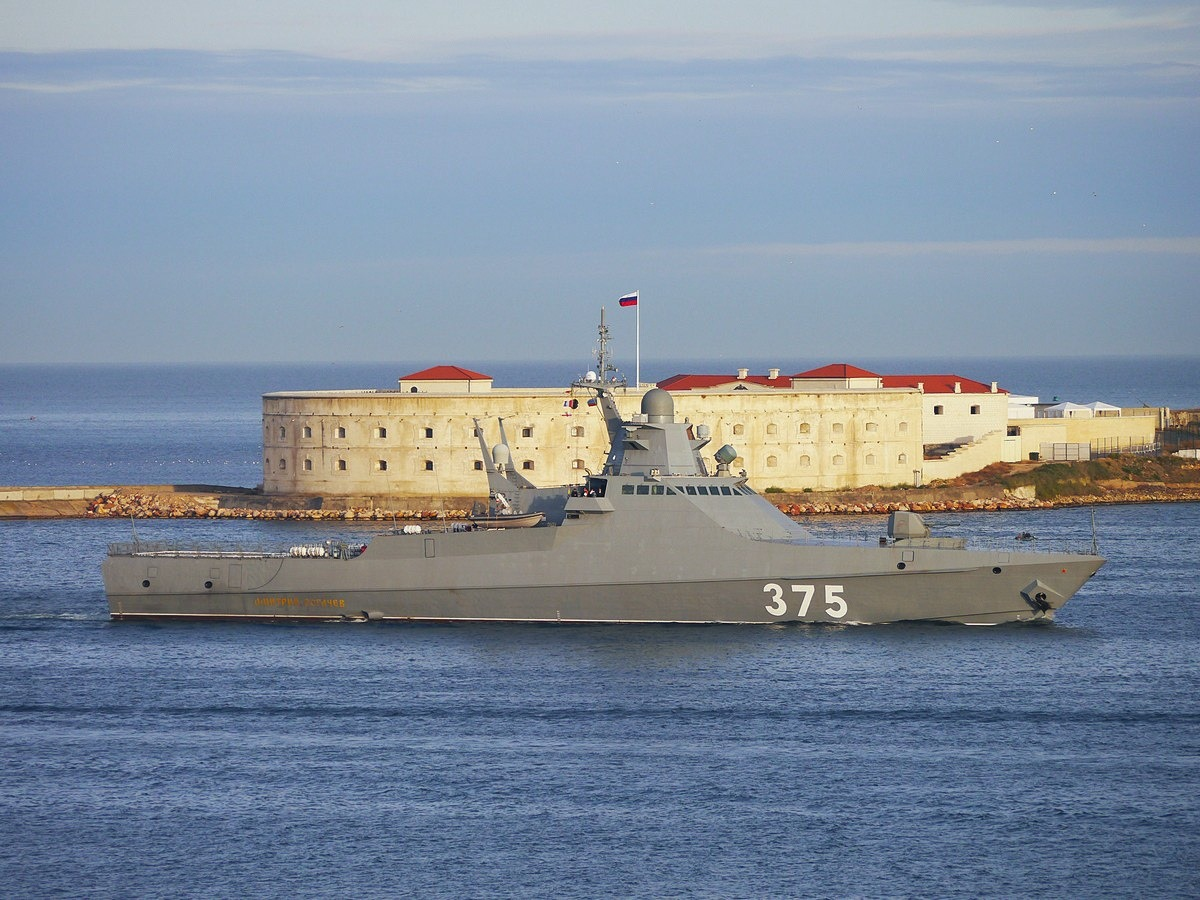
(Project 22160 Dmitriy Rogachev in Sevastopol)

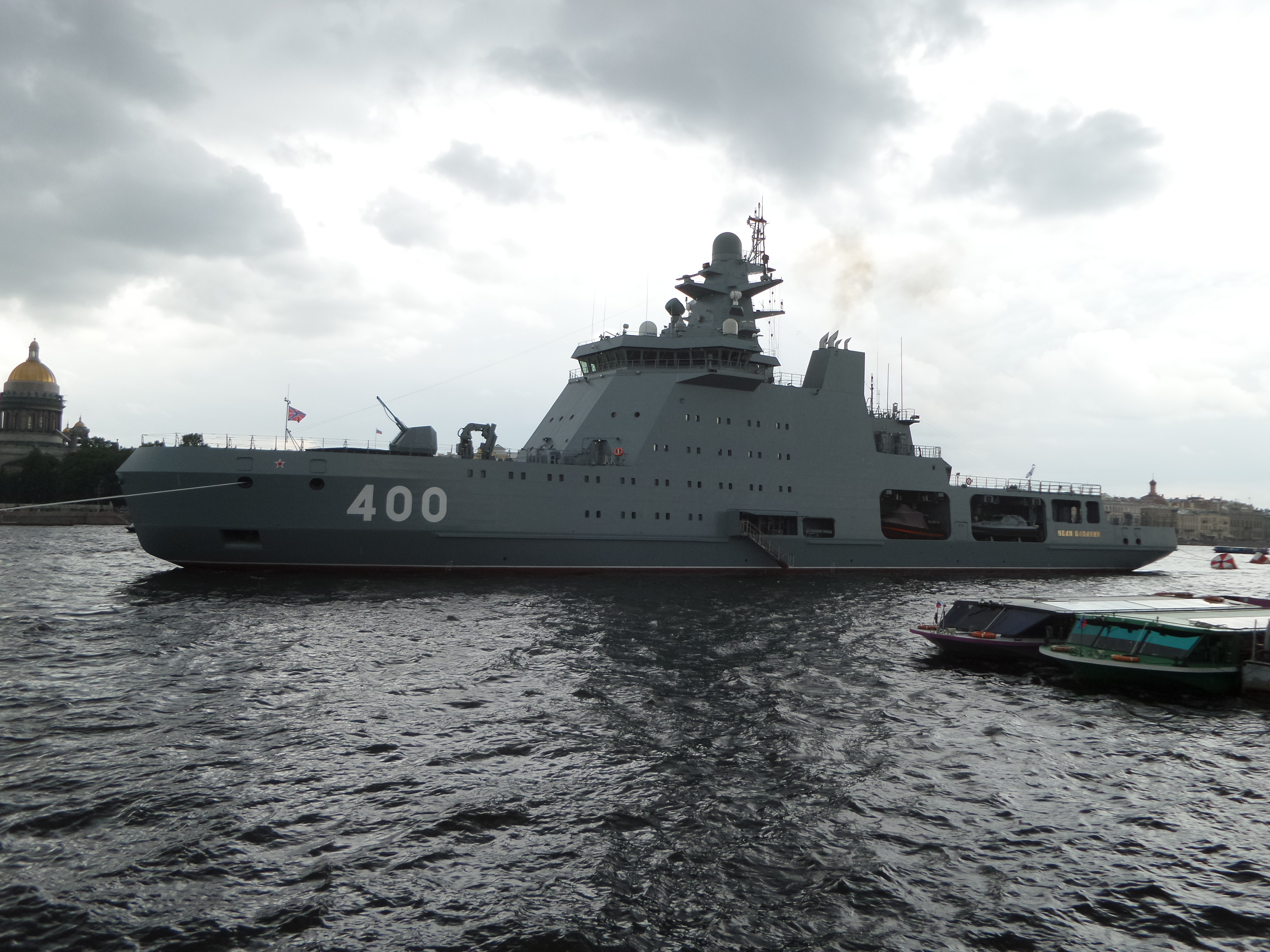
(Russian patrol ship Ivan Papanin)

=== Patrol boats ===
Class	Project	Ship	Pennant no.	Commissioned	Displacement	Fleet	Note
Quantity (>60)
Grachonok	21980	Nakhimovets	689	2009	139 t	Baltic Fleet	
Grachonok	21980	Kadet?	840	2011	139 t	Black Sea Fleet	Reported in the Mediterranean at the start of the Russo-Ukraine War; may have been abandoned at Tartus naval base in Syria in late 2024/early 2025 or possibly reactivated at that same location as of June 2026
Grachonok	21980	Suvorovets	841	2012	139 t	Black Sea Fleet	Reported damaged in drone attack in August 2023; status unknown
Grachonok	21980	Kursant Kirovets	842	2013	139 t	Black Sea Fleet	Active at the start of the Russo-Ukraine War
Grachonok	21980	Yunarmeets Kaspiya	600	2013	139 t	Caspian Flotilla	
Grachonok	21980	Yunarmeets Kryma	836	2014	139 t	Black Sea Fleet	All active at the start of Russo-Ukraine War
Grachonok	21980	Kinel	837	2014	139 t	Black Sea Fleet	All active at the start of Russo-Ukraine War
Grachonok	21980	Pavel Silaev	844	2017	139 t	Black Sea Fleet	All active at the start of Russo-Ukraine War
Grachonok	21980	Yunarmeets Tatarstana	601	2018	139 t	Caspian Flotilla	
Grachonok	21980	Yunarmeets Dagestana	602	2019	139 t	Caspian Flotilla	
Grachonok	21980	P-468	651	2022	139 t	Baltic Fleet	
Grachonok	21980	Vladimir Nosov	652	2022	139 t	Baltic Fleet	
Grachonok	21980	P-	695	2022	139 t	Baltic Fleet	
Grachonok	21980	P-377	996	2013	139 t	Pacific Fleet	
Grachonok	21980	Yunarmeets Primorya	997	2014	139 t	Pacific Fleet	(Note: Shipyard No. 8003)
Grachonok	21980	Yunarmeets Kamchatki	998	2014	139 t	Pacific Fleet	
Grachonok	21980	Yunarmeets Chukotki	994	2017	139 t	Pacific Fleet	
Grachonok	21980	P-445	973	2018	139 t	Pacific Fleet	
Grachonok	21980	Yunarmeets Sakhalina	969	2020	139 t	Pacific Fleet	
Grachonok	21980	Yunarmeets Zapolyarya	938	2016	139 t	Northern Fleet	(Note: Shipyard No. 669)
Grachonok	21980	Yunarmeets Belomorya	939	2016	139 t	Northern Fleet	
Grachonok	21980	P-429	936	2017	139 t	Northern Fleet	
Grachonok	21980	Valery Fedyanin	941	2017	139 t	Northern Fleet	
Grachonok	21980	P-475 Denis Vasilchenko		2024	139 t	Northern Fleet	Formerly Grachonok; named changed 2025
Raptor-class patrol boat	03160	P-281 Maksim Panin		2015	43 t	Baltic Fleet	
Raptor-class patrol boat	03160	P-415 Georgiy Potekhin		2017	43 t	Baltic Fleet	
Raptor-class patrol boat	03160	P-344		2015	43 t	Baltic Fleet	
Raptor-class patrol boat	03160	P-345 Buyevlyanin?		2015	43 t	Black Sea Fleet	Ukrainian officials released three separate videos showing six Raptor-class boats damaged/destroyed in 2022; some may have been repaired but at least three Raptor-class boats listed as destroyed as of mid-2024; some Raptors reported operational at Tartus naval base in Syria as of late 2024 and again in June 2026; additional boats possibly under construction/delivery
Raptor-class patrol boat	03160	P-274?		2015	43 t	Black Sea Fleet	Ukrainian officials released three separate videos showing six Raptor-class boats damaged/destroyed in 2022; some may have been repaired but at least three Raptor-class boats listed as destroyed as of mid-2024; some Raptors reported operational at Tartus naval base in Syria as of late 2024 and again in June 2026; additional boats possibly under construction/delivery
Raptor-class patrol boat	03160	P-275?		2015	43 t	Black Sea Fleet	Ukrainian officials released three separate videos showing six Raptor-class boats damaged/destroyed in 2022; some may have been repaired but at least three Raptor-class boats listed as destroyed as of mid-2024; some Raptors reported operational at Tartus naval base in Syria as of late 2024 and again in June 2026; additional boats possibly under construction/delivery
Raptor-class patrol boat	03160	P-276?		2015	43 t	Black Sea Fleet	Ukrainian officials released three separate videos showing six Raptor-class boats damaged/destroyed in 2022; some may have been repaired but at least three Raptor-class boats listed as destroyed as of mid-2024; some Raptors reported operational at Tartus naval base in Syria as of late 2024 and again in June 2026; additional boats possibly under construction/delivery
Raptor-class patrol boat	03160	P-413 Andrey Paliy?		2017	43 t	Black Sea Fleet	Ukrainian officials released three separate videos showing six Raptor-class boats damaged/destroyed in 2022; some may have been repaired but at least three Raptor-class boats listed as destroyed as of mid-2024; some Raptors reported operational at Tartus naval base in Syria as of late 2024 and again in June 2026; additional boats possibly under construction/delivery
Raptor-class patrol boat	03160	P-? ?		2015	43 t	Black Sea Fleet	Ukrainian officials released three separate videos showing six Raptor-class boats damaged/destroyed in 2022; some may have been repaired but at least three Raptor-class boats listed as destroyed as of mid-2024; some Raptors reported operational at Tartus naval base in Syria as of late 2024 and again in June 2026; additional boats possibly under construction/delivery
Raptor-class patrol boat	03160	P-425 Chapaevsk?		2017	43 t	Black Sea Fleet	Ukrainian officials released three separate videos showing six Raptor-class boats damaged/destroyed in 2022; some may have been repaired but at least three Raptor-class boats listed as destroyed as of mid-2024; some Raptors reported operational at Tartus naval base in Syria as of late 2024 and again in June 2026; additional boats possibly under construction/delivery
Raptor-class patrol boat	03160	P-437 Grigory Davidenko		2018	43 t	Baltic Fleet	
Raptor-class patrol boat	03160	P-436		2018	43 t	Caspian Flotilla	
Raptor-class patrol boat	03160	P-342 Yunarmeets Baltiki		2015	43 t	Baltic Fleet	Originally assigned to the Baltic Fleet, but serving in the Black Sea Fleet as of 2022; damaged in 2022 Ukrainian attack but reported to have undergone repairs
Raptor-class patrol boat	03160	P-456 Yunarmeets Moskvy		2020	43 t	Baltic Fleet	
Raptor-class patrol boat	03160	P-461		2020	43 t	Baltic Fleet	
Raptor-class patrol boat	03160	P-462		2020	43 t	Baltic Fleet	
Raptor-class patrol boat	03160	Evgeny Kolesnikov		2017	43 t	Baltic Fleet	
Dockstavarvet IC16M	IC16MII	12 in service		2004-2013	22 t	Black Sea Fleet & elsewhere?	Fast interceptor craft (original Swedish design); two vessels (P-835 & P-834) reported tasked to the Black Sea Fleet; other taskings/names unclear (some may be Federal Protective Service vessels)
Shmel	1204	Ak-209	045	1982	77 t	Caspian Flotilla	
Shmel	1204	Ak-223	047	1982	77 t	Caspian Flotilla	
Shmel	1204	Al-201	042	1983	77 t	Caspian Flotilla	
Shmel	1204	Ak-248	044	1983	77 t	Caspian Flotilla	
Gyurza-M	58155	Razboynik		2023	54 t	Black Sea Fleet	ex Ukraine navy ship Akkerman
Gyurza-M	58155	Nayezdnik		2023	54 t	Black Sea Fleet	ex Ukraine navy ship Vyshgorod
Zhuk-class patrol boat	1400 "Grif"	Most sold abroad/decommissioned; a few remaining boats tasked to the Coast Guard or possibly the navy		1969-2000	c. 35-40 t	Black Sea Fleet & elswhere?	One vessel, AK-388, transferred from the Northern to the Black Sea Fleet in 2026

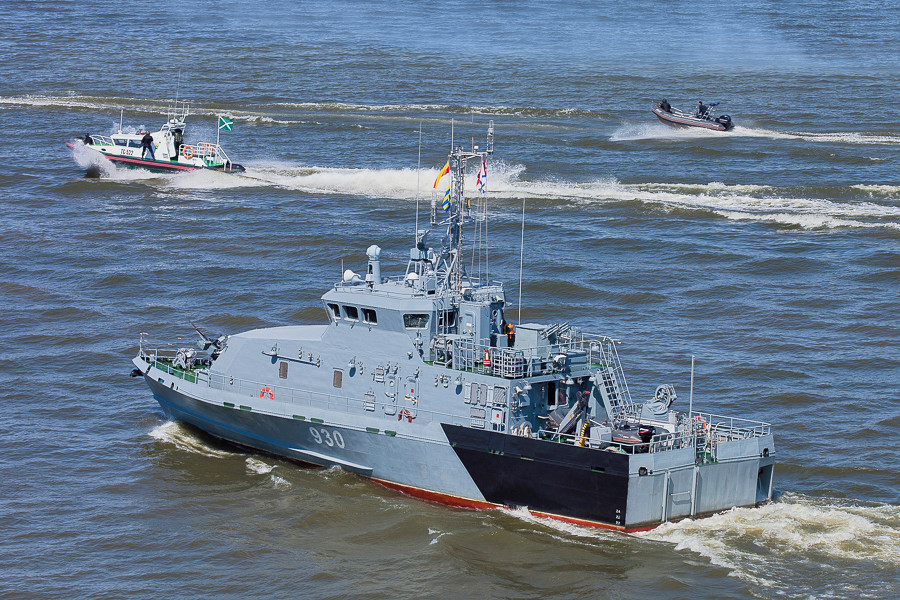
(Grachonok class)

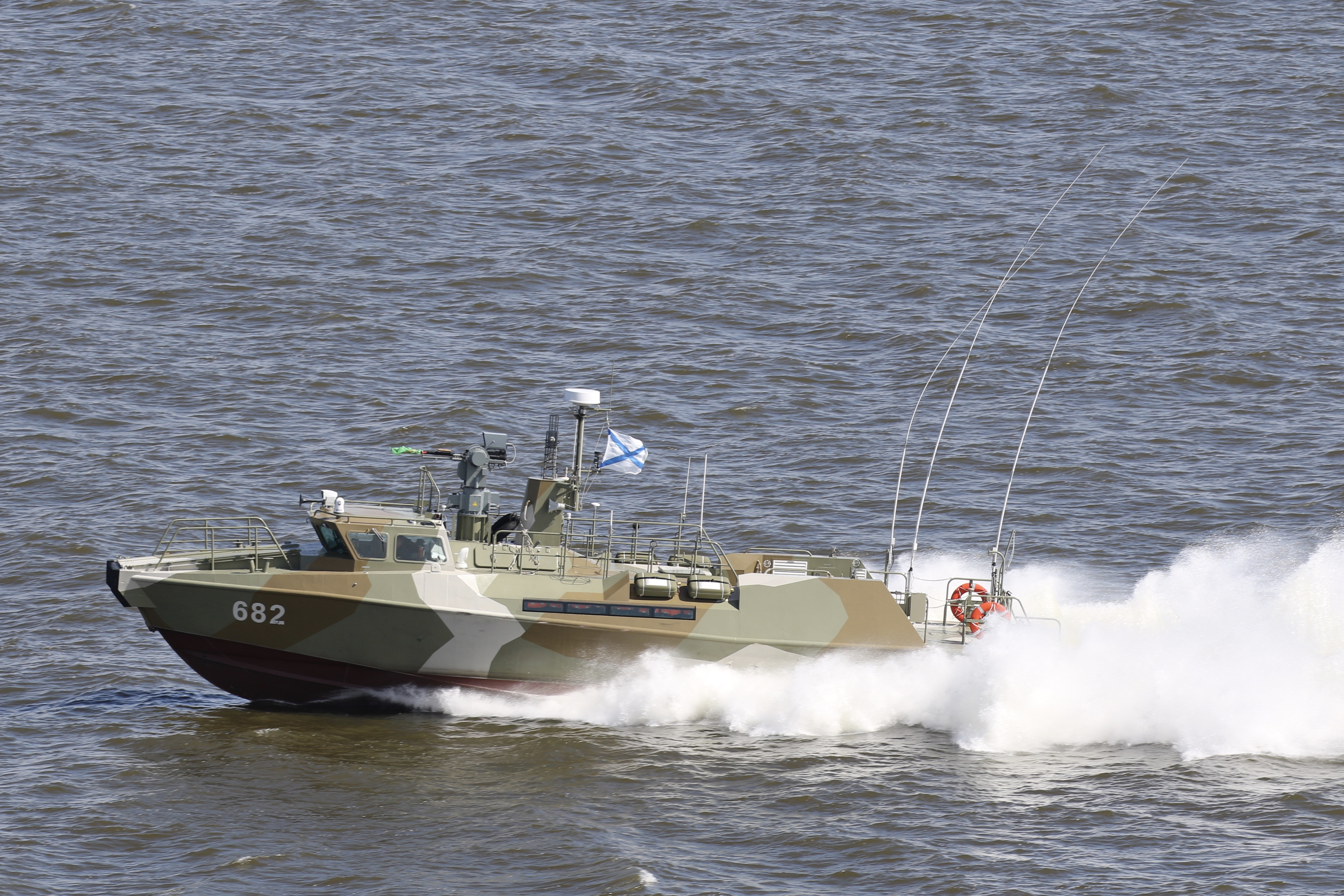
(Raptor class)

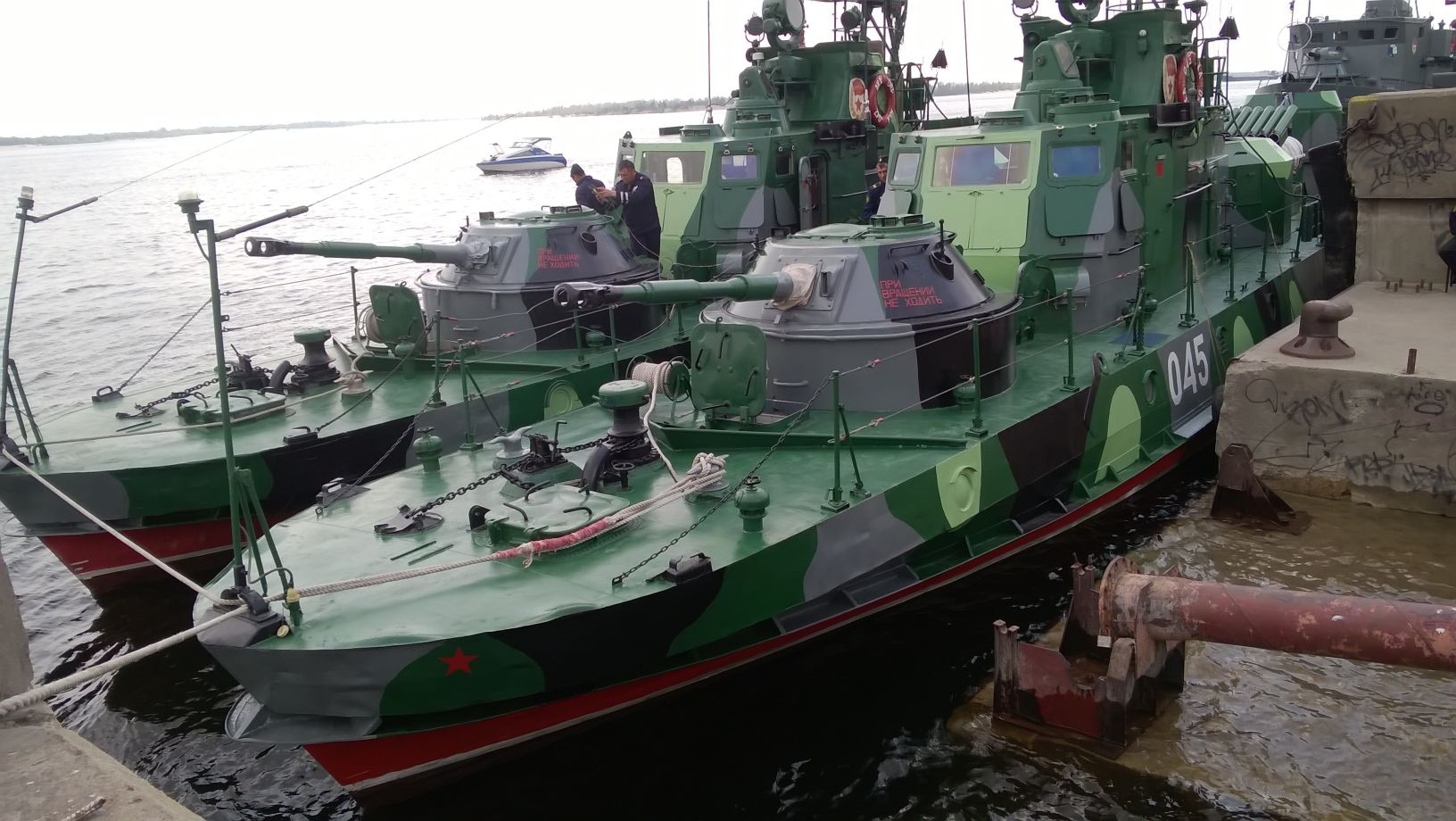
(Shmel class)

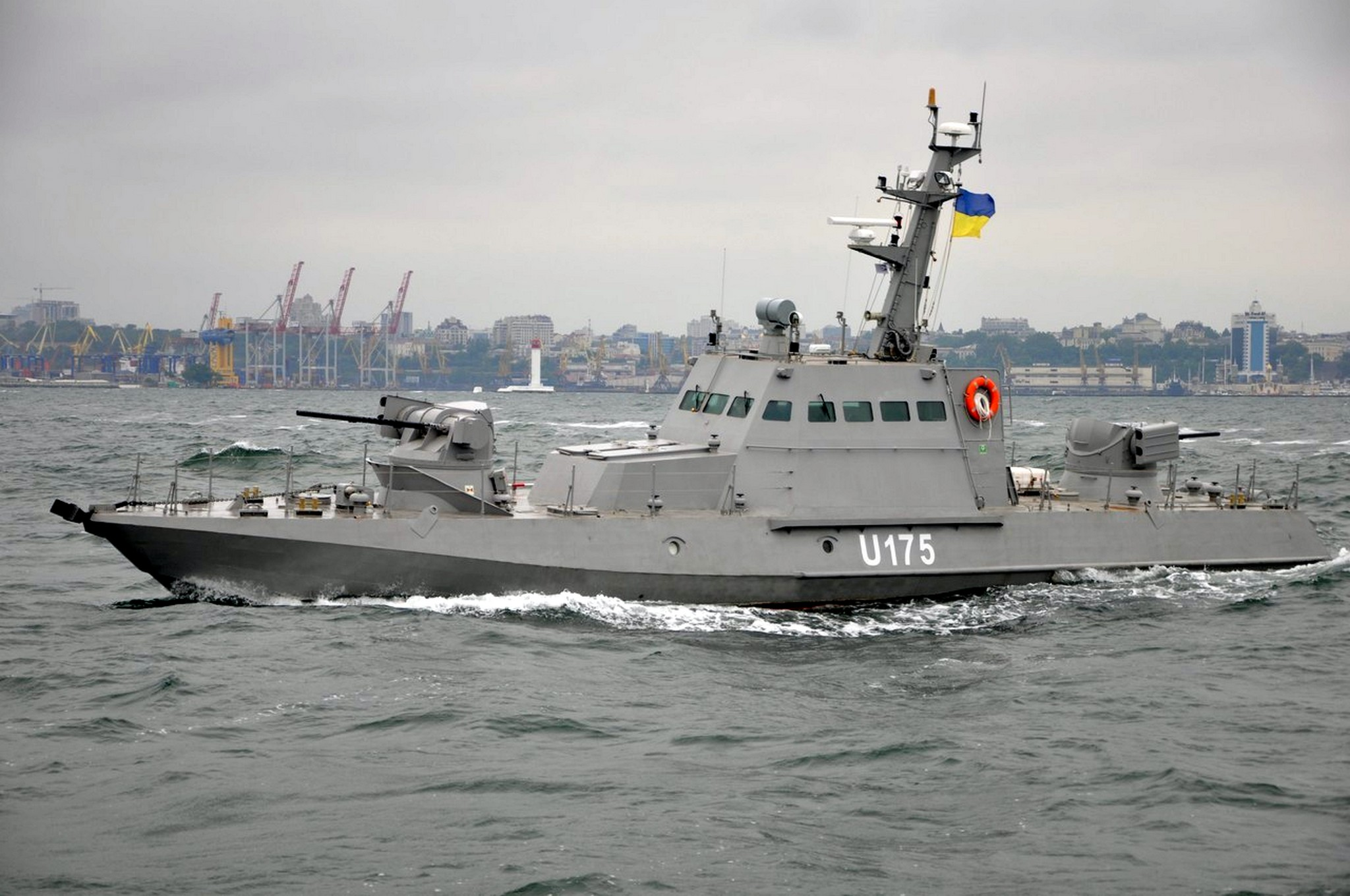
(Gyurza-M class)

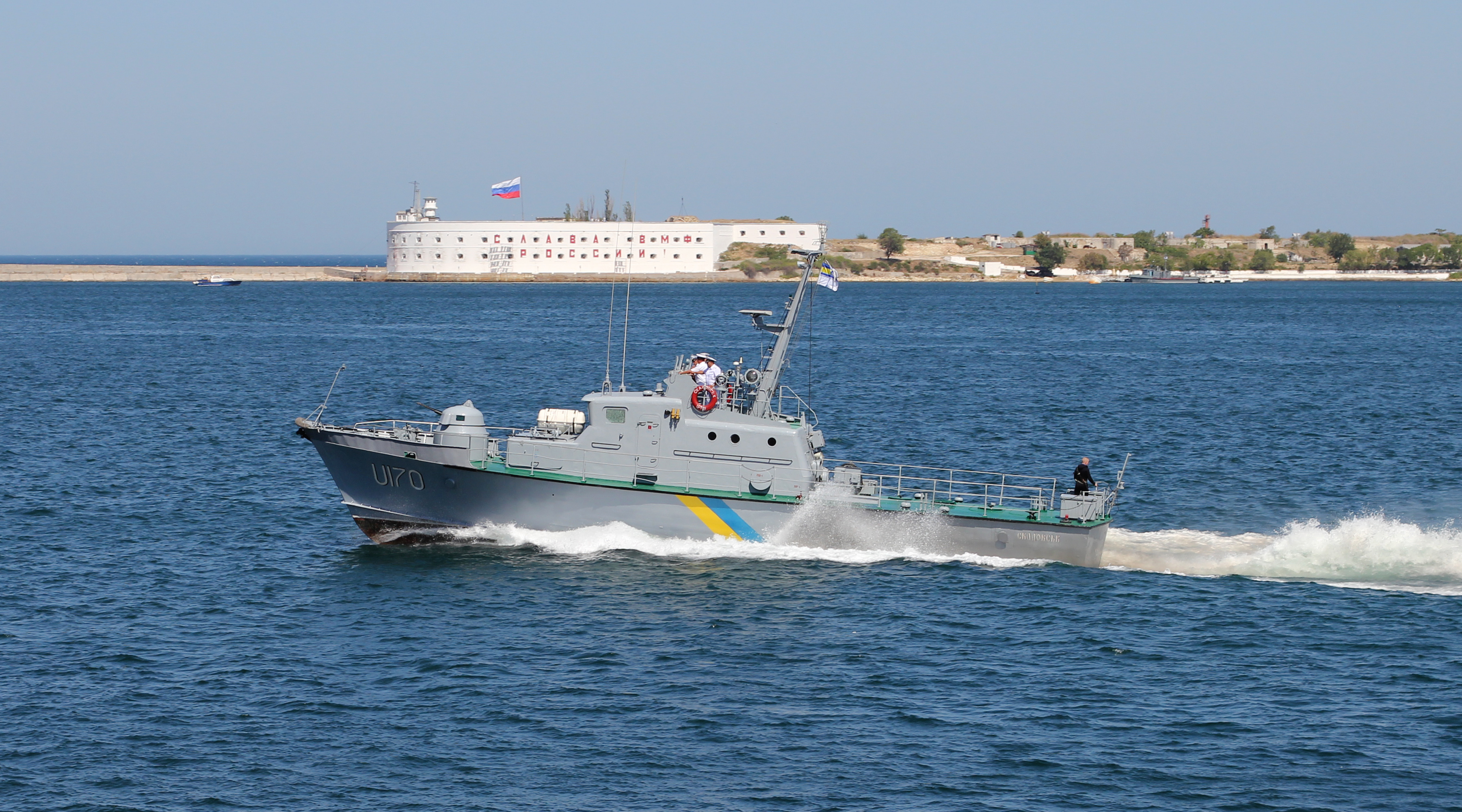
(Zhuk-class; in Ukrainian colours)

== Mine countermeasures vessels ==
Class	Project	Ship	Pennant no.	Commissioned	Displacement	Fleet	Note
Quantity (>43)
Natya	266M	Ivan Golubets		1973	800 t	Black Sea Fleet	Damaged on 29 October 2022 during a drone attack on the port of Sevastopol; subsequently repaired; Active as of 2023
Natya	266ME	Valentin Pikul		2001	804 t	Black Sea Fleet	Active as of 2022; may have been damaged in drone strike March 2026
Natya	266ME	MT-264		1989	804 t	Pacific Fleet	Both reported active as of 2022
Natya	266ME	MT-265		1989	804 t	Pacific Fleet	Both reported active as of 2022
Natya	02668	Vice-admiral Zakharin		2008	804 t	Black Sea Fleet	Active as of 2023
Alexandrit	12700	Alexandr Obukhov		2016	620 t	Baltic Fleet	Active as of 2025
Alexandrit	12700	Georgy Kurbatov		2021	620 t	Black Sea Fleet	Active as of 2022
Alexandrit	12700	Vladimir Emelyanov		2019	620 t	Black Sea Fleet	Assigned to the Black Sea Fleet but operating in the Mediterranean/Baltic as of 2023
Alexandrit	12700	Ivan Antonov		2018	620 t	Black Sea Fleet	Active as of 2023
Alexandrit	12700	Yakov Balyaev		2020	620 t	Pacific Fleet	Active as of 2025
Alexandrit	12700	Pyotr Ilyichev		2022	620 t	Pacific Fleet	Active as of 2025
Alexandrit	12700	Anatoly Shlemov		2022	620 t	Pacific Fleet	Active as of 2026
Alexandrit	12700	Lev Chernavin		2023	620 t	Baltic Fleet	Active as of 2025
Alexandrit	12700	Afanasy Ivannikov		2025	620 t	Northern Fleet	Active as of 2025
Alexandrit	12700	Polyarny		2026	620 t	Northern Fleet	Active as of 2026
Alexandrit	12700	Dmitry Lysov		2026	620 t	Northern Fleet	Entered service in the Baltic in 2026
Sonya	1265	Leonid Sobolev		1990	460 t	Baltic Fleet	Both active as of 2022
Sonya	1265	Novocheboksarsk		1991	460 t	Baltic Fleet	Both active as of 2022
Sonya	1265	Sergey Kolbasev		1992	460 t	Baltic Fleet	Status uncertain; may have decommissioned in 2023
Sonya	1265	Pavel Khenov (former BT-115)		1993	460 t	Baltic Fleet	Active as of 2025
Sonya	1265	Polyarny		1984	460 t	Northern Fleet	Active as of 2020 but may decommission in due course given same name assigned to Alexandrit-class vessel commissioned in 2026
Sonya	1265	Elynya		1986	460 t	Northern Fleet	Active as of 2022
Sonya	1265	Kotelnich		1987	460 t	Northern Fleet	Active as of 2025
Sonya	1265	Solovetskiy Yunga		1988	460 t	Northern Fleet	Active as of 2025
Sonya	1265	Kolomna		1990	460 t	Northern Fleet	Active as of 2026
Sonya	1265	Yadrin		1991	460 t	Northern Fleet	Active as of 2023
Sonya	1265	BT-100		1984	460 t	Pacific Fleet	Active as of 2024
Sonya	1265	BT-325		1985	460 t	Pacific Fleet	Active as of 2024
Sonya	1265	BT-232		1988	460 t	Pacific Fleet	Active as of 2023
Sonya	1265	BT-245		1989	460 t	Pacific Fleet	Active as of 2024
Sonya	1265	BT-256		1990	460 t	Pacific Fleet	Active as of 2024
Sonya	1265	German Ugryumov		1988	460 t	Caspian Flotilla	Active as of 2024
Sonya	1265	Magomed Gadzhiev		1997	460 t	Caspian Flotilla	Active as of 2024
Lida	10750	RT-57?		1989	135 t	Baltic Fleet	Status uncertain; may have decommissioned in 2026 (unconfirmed)
Lida	10750	RT-248		1990	135 t	Baltic Fleet	
Lida	10750	Vasily Polyakov		1991	135 t	Baltic Fleet	Active as of 2025
Lida	10750	Viktor Sigalov		1992	135 t	Baltic Fleet	
Lida	10750	RT-233		1989	135 t	Black Sea Fleet	Reportedly transferred from the Caspian Flotilla to the Black Sea Fleet as of June 2023
Lida	10750	RT-234		1989	135 t	Caspian Flotilla	Active as of 2021
Gorya	12660	Zheleznyakov		1988	1,150 t	Black Sea Fleet	Active as of 2020
Gorya	12660	Gumanenko		2000	1,150 t	Northern Fleet	Active as of 2022
Yevgenya	1258	1 (RT-71) + others? remain in service		1967-1985	91 t	Caspian Flotilla & others?	Total of 53 inshore minesweepers of the class were built between 1967-1985; c. 49 decommissioned/transferred to other countries; a few (eg. RT-71 as of 2024) may remain in commission
697TB	697TB	RT-59		1976	157 t	Caspian Flotilla	Both may still be in service
697TB	697TB	RT-181		1980	157 t	Caspian Flotilla	Both may still be in service

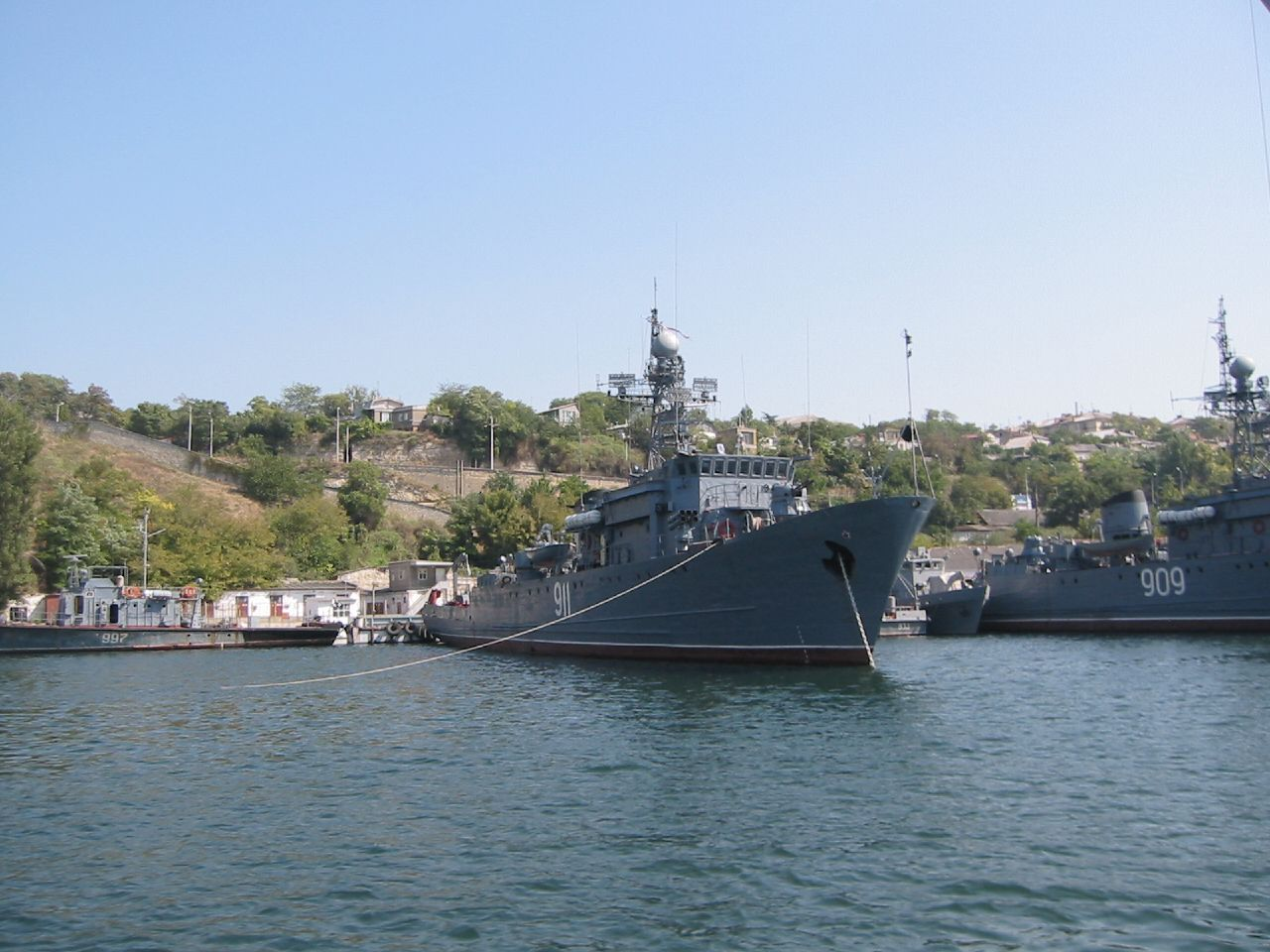
(Natya class)

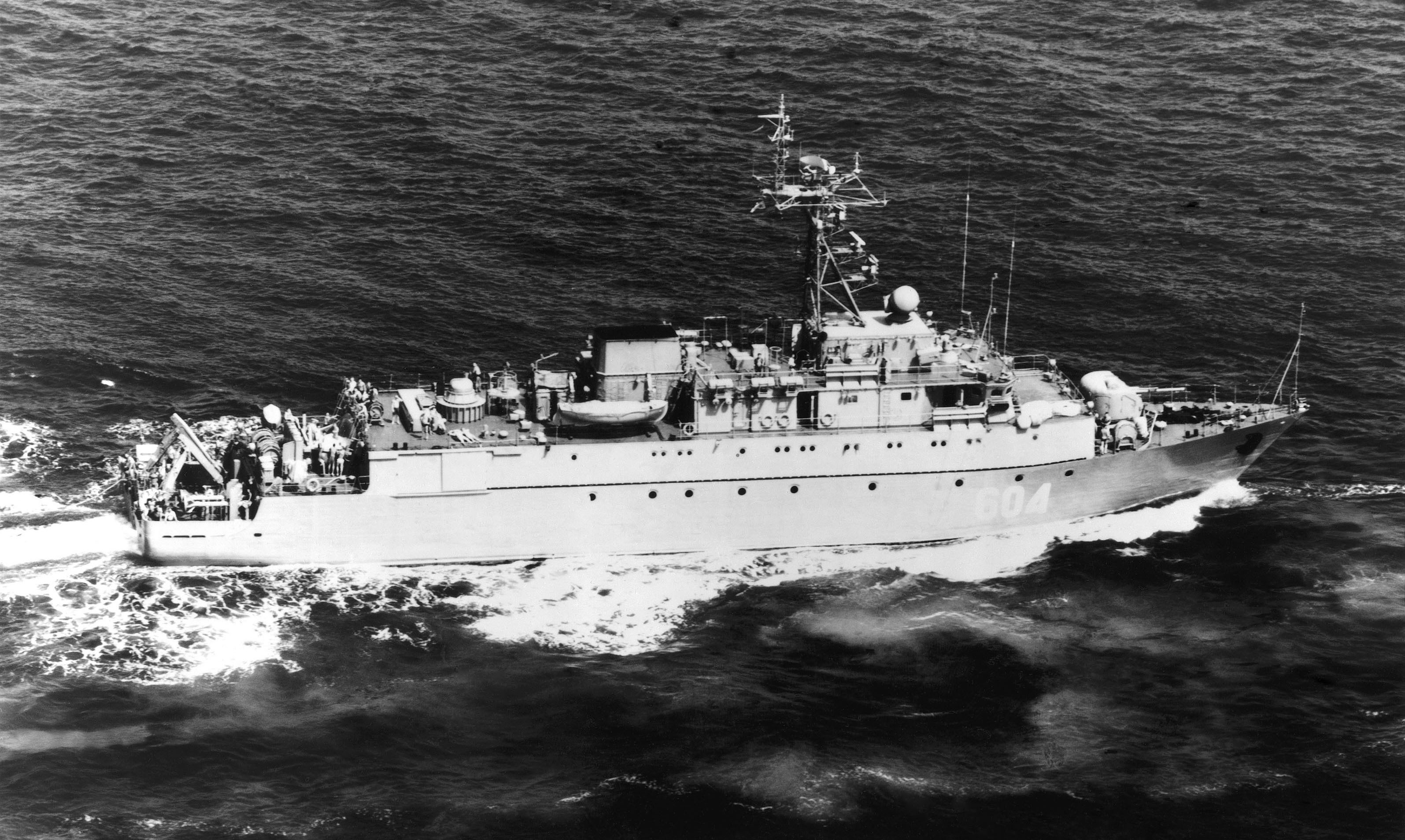
(Gorya class)

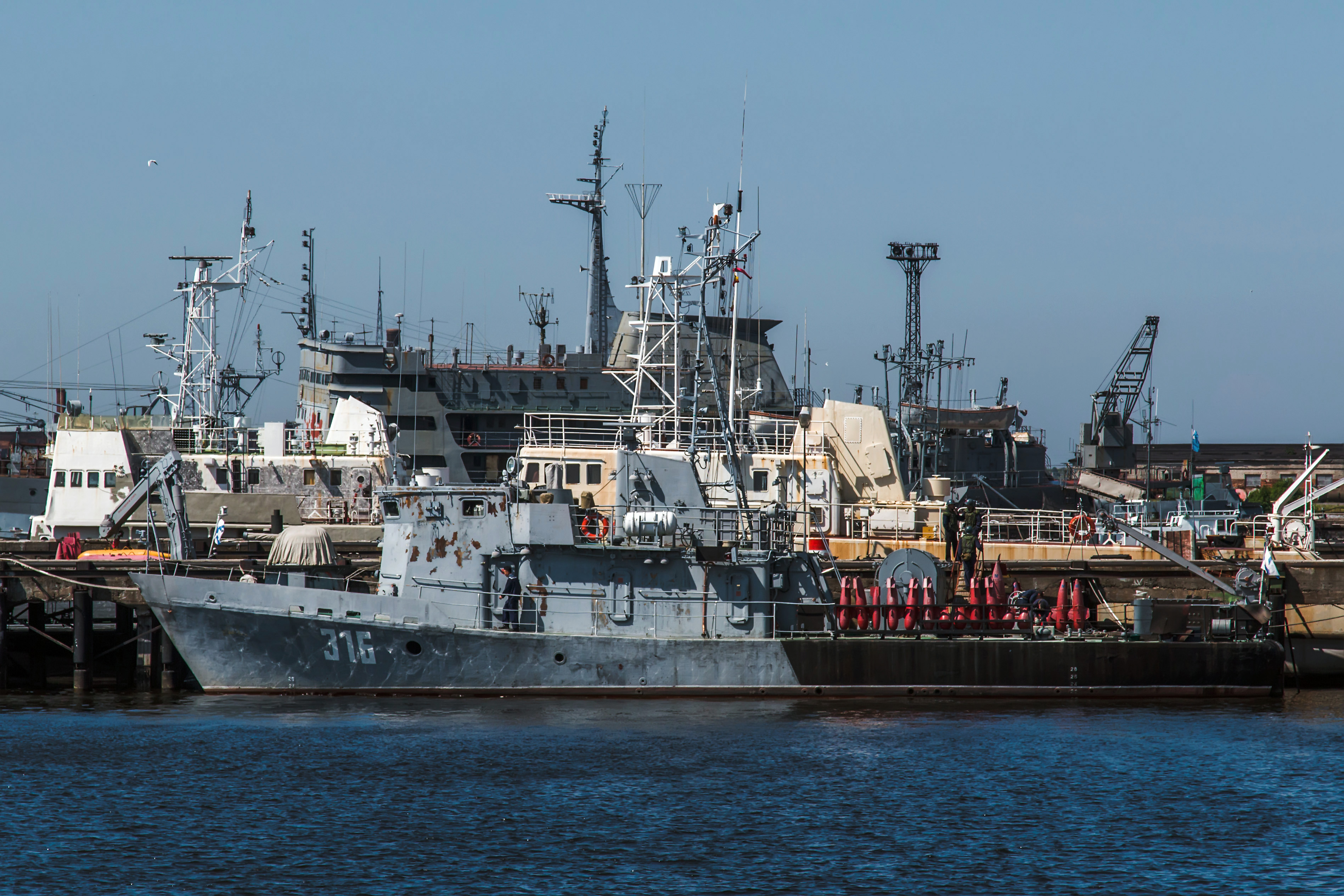
(Lida class)

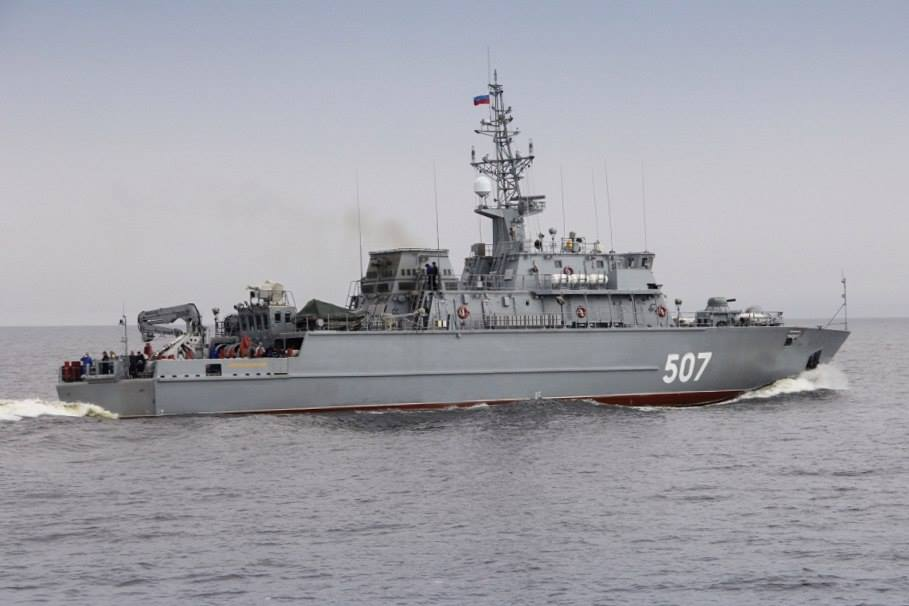
(Aleksandrit class)

== Unmanned surface vessels (USVs) ==
Class	Project	Number	Pennant no.	Commissioned	Displacement	Fleet	Note
Quantity (Unknown)
Skorlupa-class USV	Skorlupa	Unknown	Unknown	2026	Unknown	Black Sea Fleet	Multi-role. Carries two FPV aerial drones.

== Auxiliaries ==
=== Special-purpose (intelligence) ships ===
Class	Project	Ship	Pennant no.	Commissioned	Displacement	Fleet	Note
Quantity (18)
Moma-class intelligence ship	861M	Kil'din	512	1970	1,560 t	Black Sea Fleet	Active & deployed in the Baltic/Mediterranean Medium intelligence ships. Suffered fire while operating in the Mediterranean in 2025.
Moma-class intelligence ship	861M	Ekvator		1968	1,560 t	Black Sea Fleet	Unclear if active
Alpinist-class intelligence ship	503R	Syzran		1981	1,202 t	Baltic Fleet	Medium intelligence ship.
Alpinist-class intelligence ship	503R	Zhigulevsk		1982	1,202 t	Baltic Fleet	Medium intelligence ship; active as of 2026
Vishnya-class intelligence ship	864	Fedor Golovin	520	1985	3,470 t	Baltic Fleet	(Note: Intelligence ship)
Vishnya-class intelligence ship	864	Kurily	208	1986	3,470 t	Pacific Fleet	Active as of 2026
Vishnya-class intelligence ship	864	Tavriya	169	1986	3,470 t	Northern Fleet	
Vishnya-class intelligence ship	864	Kareliya	535	1986	3,470 t	Pacific Fleet	Active as of 2026
Vishnya-class intelligence ship	864	Priazovye	201	1987	3,470 t	Black Sea Fleet	Active as of 2023
Vishnya-class intelligence ship	864	Viktor Leonov	175	1988	3,470 t	Northern Fleet	Active as of 2026
Vishnya-class intelligence ship	864	Vasiliy Tatishchev	231	1988	3,470 t	Baltic Fleet	Active as of 2026
Balzam-class intelligence ship	1826	Pribaltika	80	1983	4,900 t	Pacific Fleet	Active as of 2024 (Note: Intelligence and communications ship)
Yury Ivanov-class intelligence ship	18280	Yuriy Ivanov		2015	4,000 t	Northern Fleet	Active as of 2026
Yury Ivanov-class intelligence ship	18280	Ivan Khurs		2018	4,000 t	Black Sea Fleet	Active in 2023, hit by uncrewed surface vessel in 2023 and reportedly again in April 2026
Baklan-class intelligence ship	1388NZ	KSV-2168		2018	500 t	Baltic Fleet	
Marshal Nedelin-class intelligence ship	1914	Marshal Krylov		1990	23,780 t	Pacific Fleet	Active as of 2026
Project 7452 ship	7452	Chusuvoy		1987	1,300 t	Northern Fleet	Active as of 2024
Project 22010 ship	22010	Yantar		2015	5,200 t	Northern Fleet	Active as of 2025 (Note: Oceanographic research ship)

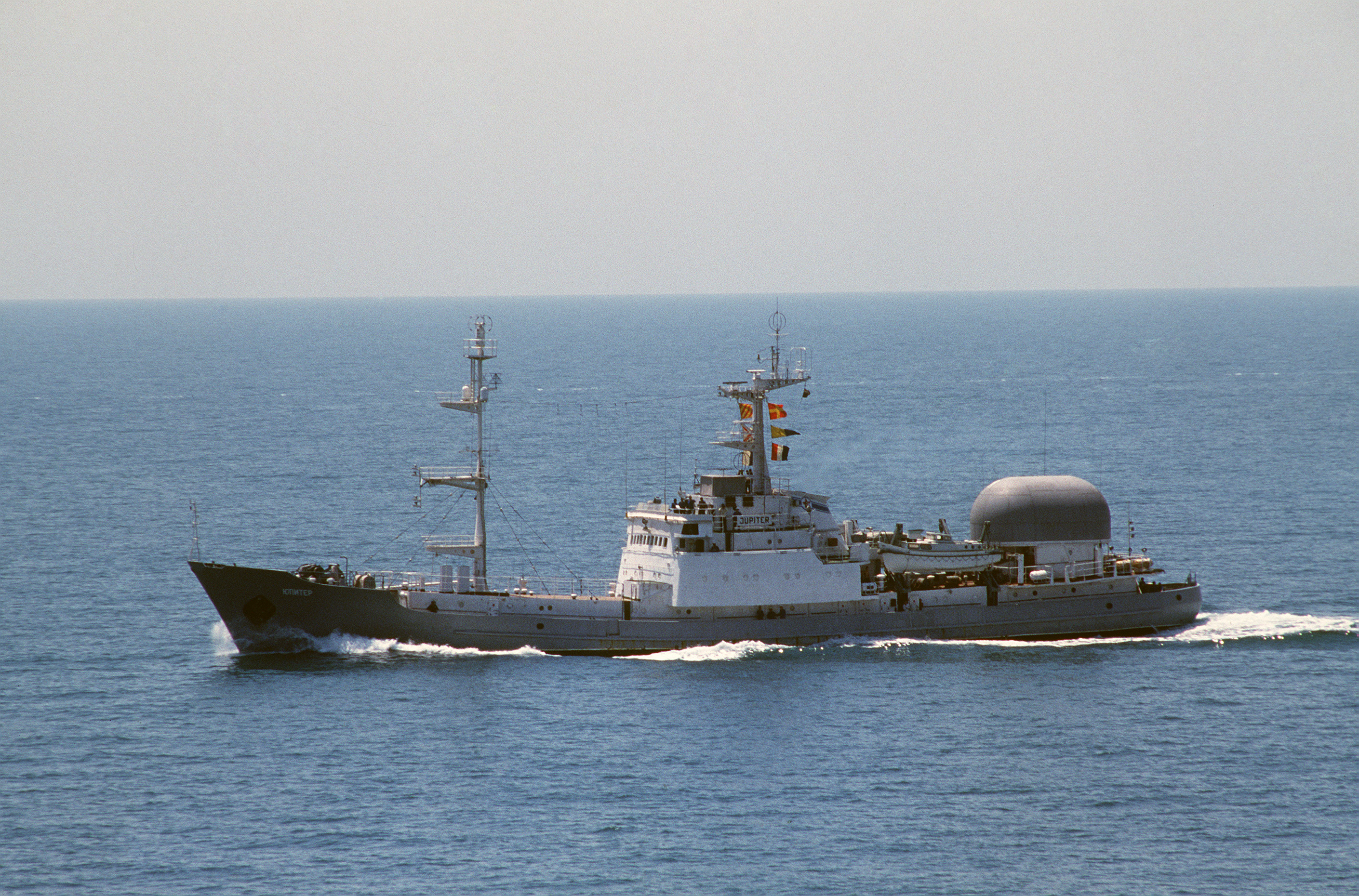
(Moma class)

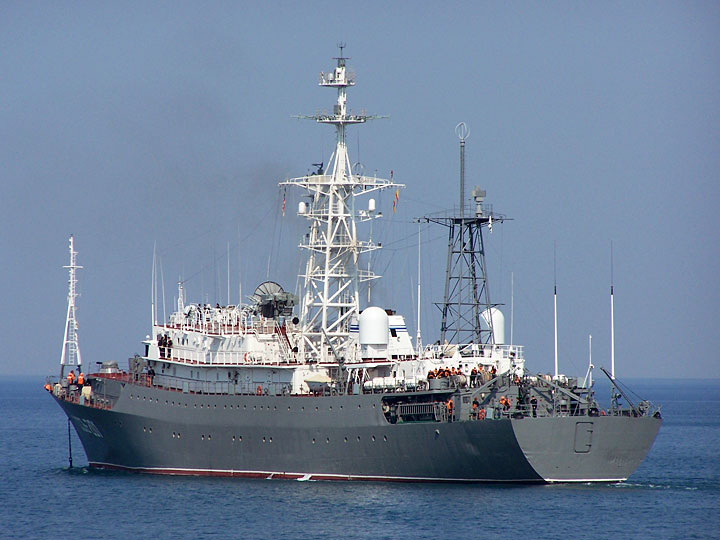
(Vishnya class)

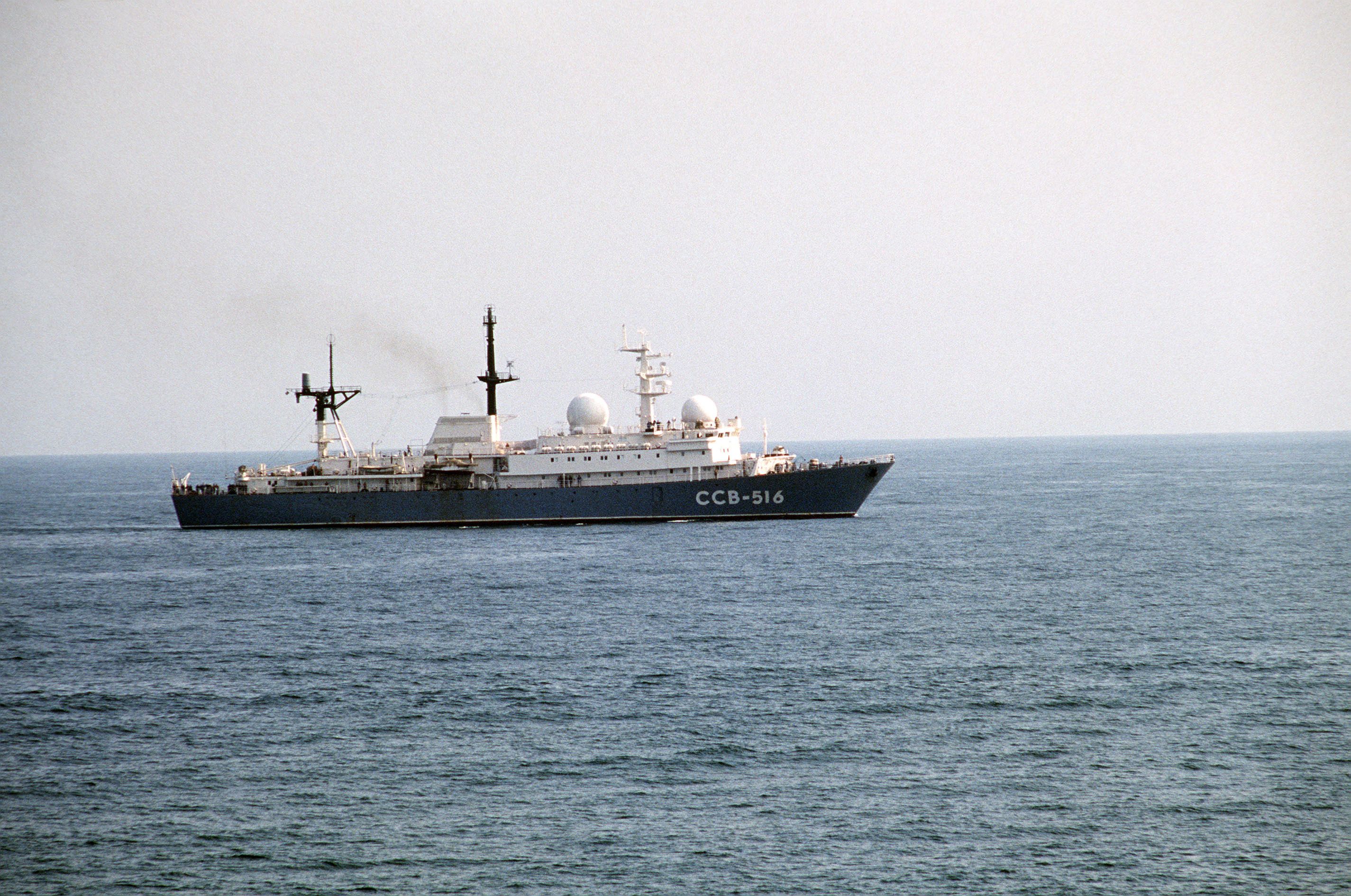
(Balzam class)

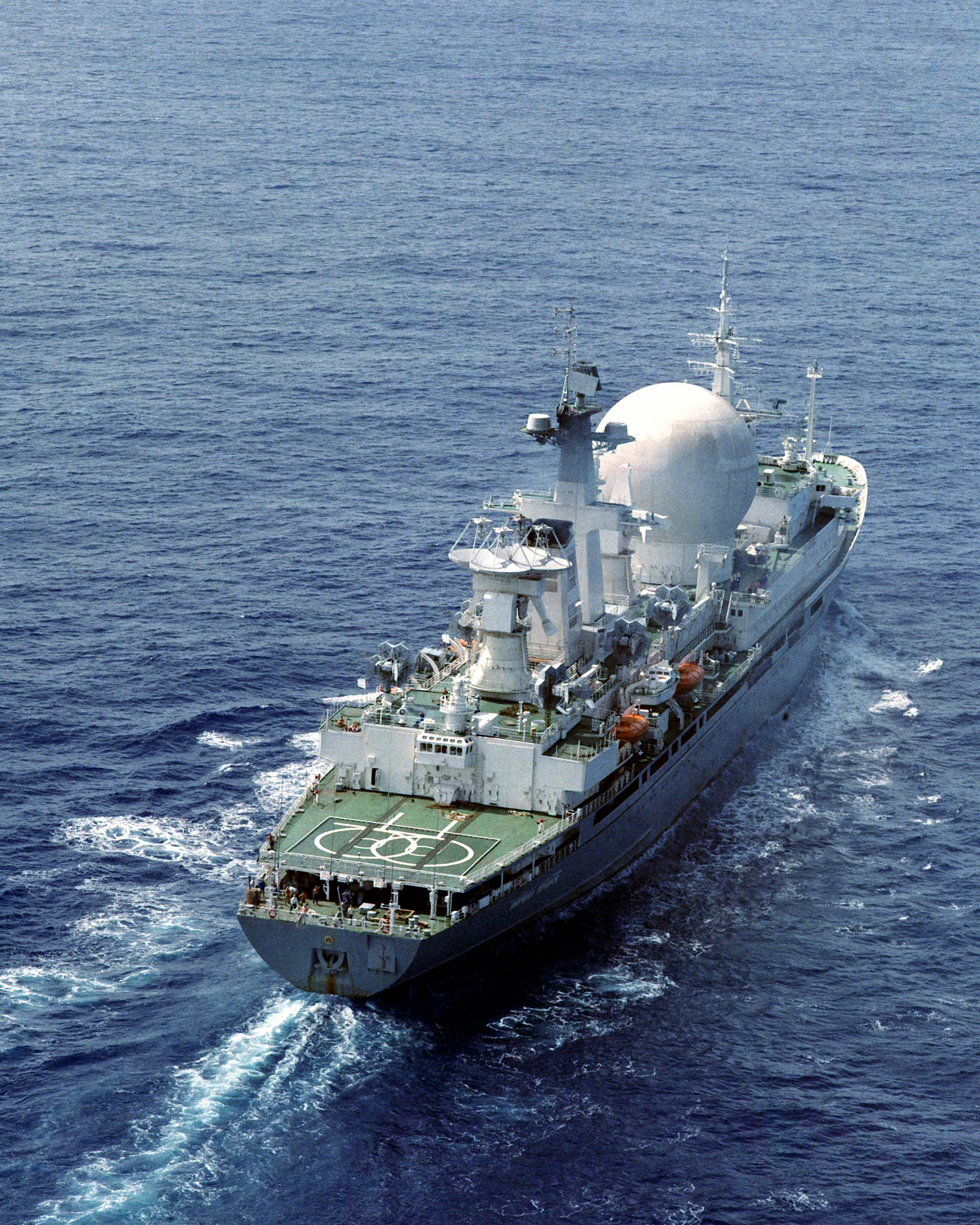
(Marshal Nedelin class)

=== Icebreakers, tenders, replenishment ships and other auxiliaries ===
Class	Project	Type	Number	Name	Commissioned	Fleet	Note
Icebreakers (5)
Dobrynya Nikitich	97K	Diesel-electric icebreaker	1	Buran	1966	Baltic Fleet	All active as of 2024
Ivan Susanin	97P	Icebreaking patrol ship	2	Ivan Susanin	1973	Pacific Fleet	All active as of 2024
Ivan Susanin	97P	Icebreaking patrol ship	2	Ruslan	1975	Northern Fleet	All active as of 2024
Project 21180	21180	Diesel-electric icebreaker	1	Ilya Muromets	2017	Northern Fleet	Active
Project 21180M	21180M	Diesel-electric icebreaker	1	Evpatiy Kolovrat	2024	Pacific Fleet	Active
Hospital ships (3)
Ob class	320	Hospital ship	3	Yenisey	1981	Black Sea Fleet	Inactive; reported in Sevastopol's Yuzhnaya Bay as of 2025
Ob class	320	Hospital ship	3	Svir	1989	Northern Fleet	Inactive (since 2006)
Ob class	320	Hospital ship	3	Irtysh	1990	Pacific Fleet	Reported active as of 2025
Logistic support vessels (58)
Muna	1823	Coastal munitions transport	6	BTP 89	1965	Pacific Fleet	
Muna	1823	Coastal munitions transport	6	BTP 91	1965	Pacific Fleet	
Muna	1823	Coastal munitions transport	6	BTP 85	1967	Pacific Fleet	
Muna	1823	Coastal munitions transport	6	BTP 87	1967	Pacific Fleet	
Muna	1823	Coastal munitions transport	6	BTP 94	1971	Black Sea Fleet	
Muna	1823	Coastal munitions transport	6	BTP 76	1985	Pacific Fleet	
Luza	1541	Missile fuel tanker	3	Selenga	1966	Baltic Fleet	
Luza	1541	Missile fuel tanker	3	Barguzin	1967	Pacific Fleet	
Luza	1541	Missile fuel tanker	3	Alambay	1968	Pacific Fleet	
Vala	1783	Special waste tanker	2	TNT-11	1966	Pacific Fleet	
Vala	1783	Special waste tanker	2	TNT-27	1968	Pacific Fleet	
Amguema	550	Polar logistic vessel	1	Yauza	1974	Northern Fleet	
Project 1791 Kalmar	1791	Armament transport	2	Daugava & Amga	1972 (Amga) & 1980 (Daugava)	Pacific Fleet (Daugava), Northern Fleet (Amga)	Daugava active as of 2026
Project 1807	1807	Weapons transport	1	BTR-139	1978	Caspian Flotilla	
AMGA/Daugava	1791	Ballistic missile transport	1	Daugava	1980	Pacific Fleet	
Dubnyak	20360	Ammunition transport	2	VTR 79	2010	Caspian Flotilla	
Dubnyak	20360	Ammunition transport	2	Viktor Cherokov	2016	Black Sea Fleet	
Project 20181	20181	Ammunition transport	1	Akademik Kovalyov	2015	Pacific Fleet	Transports Bulava missiles
		Refrigerated cargo ship	1	Kazan-60	2015	Black Sea Fleet	Previously named Georgiy Agafanov bought as supply ship for Russian troops in Syria
Polnocny-class landing ship	Polnocny-C (Type 773)	Small seagoing dry-cargo ship	1	VTR-140	1972	Northern Fleet	ex-landing ship; used as support supply ship
		General cargo ship	1	Dvinitsa-50	2015	Black Sea Fleet	Previously named Alican Deval bought as supply ship for Russian troops in Syria; reported in service as of 2025
		General cargo ship	1	Kyzyl-60	2015	Black Sea Fleet	Previously named Smyrna bought as supply ship for Russian troops in Syria
		General cargo ship	1	Vologda-50	2015	Black Sea Fleet	Previously named Dadali bought as supply ship for Russian troops in Syria
		RoRo ship	1	Alexander Tkachenko	2015	Black Sea Fleet	Previously named Robur chartered as supply ship for Russian troops in Syria
Longvinik	23120	Logistic vessel	2	Elbrus	2018	Northern Fleet	
Longvinik	23120	Logistic vessel	2	Vsevelod Bobrov	2021	Black Sea Fleet	Active as of 2022
Project 02690	02690	Seagoing self-propelled floating crane	16	SPK-19150	2014	Northern Fleet	
Project 02690	02690	Seagoing self-propelled floating crane	16	SPK-37150	2014	Northern Fleet	
Project 02690	02690	Seagoing self-propelled floating crane	16	SPK-42150	2015	Pacific Fleet	
Project 02690	02690	Seagoing self-propelled floating crane	16	SPK-43150	2015	Pacific Fleet	
Project 02690	02690	Seagoing self-propelled floating crane	16	SPK-44150	2015	Pacific Fleet	
Project 02690	02690	Seagoing self-propelled floating crane	16	SPK-45150	2016	Northern Fleet	
Project 02690	02690	Seagoing self-propelled floating crane	16	SPK-46150	2016	Black Sea Fleet	
Project 02690	02690	Seagoing self-propelled floating crane	16	SPK-49150	2016	Baltic Fleet	
Project 02690	02690	Seagoing self-propelled floating crane	16	SPK-50150	2016	Baltic Fleet	
Project 02690	02690	Seagoing self-propelled floating crane	16	SPK-53150	2018	Northern Fleet	
Project 02690	02690	Seagoing self-propelled floating crane	16	SPK-54150	2019	Black Sea Fleet	
Project 02690	02690	Seagoing self-propelled floating crane	16	SPK-57150	2020	Pacific Fleet	
Project 02690	02690	Seagoing self-propelled floating crane	16	SPK-59150	2020	Caspian Flotilla	
Project 02690	02690	Seagoing self-propelled floating crane	16	SPK-60150	2021	Northern Fleet	
Project 02690	02690	Seagoing self-propelled floating crane	16	SPK-62150	2025	Northern Fleet	
Project 02690	02690	Seagoing self-propelled floating crane	16	SPK-63150	2025	Pacific Fleet	
Project 304	304	Floating Workshop	15	PM-30	1982	Baltic Fleet	PM-82 reported active and operating in the English Channel as of 2026
Project 304	304	Floating Workshop	15	PM-82	1978	Baltic Fleet	PM-82 reported active and operating in the English Channel as of 2026
Project 304	304	Floating Workshop	15	PM-86	1987	Baltic Fleet	PM-82 reported active and operating in the English Channel as of 2026
Project 304	304	Floating Workshop	15	PM-69	1987	Northern Fleet	PM-82 reported active and operating in the English Channel as of 2026
Project 304	304	Floating Workshop	15	PM-56	1973	Black Sea Fleet	Both active as of 2022
Project 304	304	Floating Workshop	15	PM-138	1969	Black Sea Fleet	Both active as of 2022
Project 304	304	Floating Workshop	15	PM-10	1982	Northern Fleet	
Project 304	304	Floating Workshop	15	PM-75	1978	Northern Fleet	
Project 304	304	Floating Workshop	15	PM-5?	1982?	Pacific Fleet	May have decommissioned in 2021
Project 304	304	Floating Workshop	15	PM-15	1982?	Pacific Fleet	
Project 304	304	Floating Workshop	15	PM-52	1977	Pacific Fleet	
Project 304	304	Floating Workshop	15	PM-59	1986	Pacific Fleet	
Project 304	304	Floating Workshop	15	PM-92	1988	Pacific Fleet	
Project 304	304	Floating Workshop	15	PM-97	1988	Pacific Fleet	
Project 304	304	Floating Workshop	15	PM-156	1972	Pacific Fleet	
Salvage vessels / Submersible supports (58)
Kommuna		Salvage vessel/ Submersible support	1	Kommuna	1915	Black Sea Fleet	Attacked by missile strike in 2024, damage appeared light; It is the world's oldest (apart from ceremonial or museum ships) active duty naval vessel
Project 23040	23040	Boat of comprehensive rescue support	25	RVK-762	2013	Black Sea Fleet	One additional vessel reported under construction; status unclear
Project 23040	23040	Boat of comprehensive rescue support	25	Grom	2021	Black Sea Fleet	One additional vessel reported under construction; status unclear
Project 23040	23040	Boat of comprehensive rescue support	25	RVK-764	2013	Black Sea Fleet	One additional vessel reported under construction; status unclear
Project 23040	23040	Boat of comprehensive rescue support	25	RVK-767	2013	Black Sea Fleet	One additional vessel reported under construction; status unclear
Project 23040	23040	Boat of comprehensive rescue support	25	RVK-771	2013	Black Sea Fleet	One additional vessel reported under construction; status unclear
Project 23040	23040	Boat of comprehensive rescue support	25	RVK-933	2014	Caspian Flotilla	One additional vessel reported under construction; status unclear
Project 23040	23040	Boat of comprehensive rescue support	25	RVK-946	2014	Caspian Flotilla	One additional vessel reported under construction; status unclear
Project 23040	23040	Boat of comprehensive rescue support	25	RVK-1045	2014	Black Sea Fleet	One additional vessel reported under construction; status unclear
Project 23040	23040	Boat of comprehensive rescue support	25	Boris Kiselev	2014	Baltic Fleet	One additional vessel reported under construction; status unclear
Project 23040	23040	Boat of comprehensive rescue support	25	RVK-1102	2014	Baltic Fleet	One additional vessel reported under construction; status unclear
Project 23040	23040	Boat of comprehensive rescue support	25	RVK-1112	2014	Black Sea Fleet	One additional vessel reported under construction; status unclear
Project 23040	23040	Boat of comprehensive rescue support	25	RVK-2162	2015	Baltic Fleet	One additional vessel reported under construction; status unclear
Project 23040	23040	Boat of comprehensive rescue support	25	RVK-2163	2015	Baltic Fleet	One additional vessel reported under construction; status unclear
Project 23040	23040	Boat of comprehensive rescue support	25	Askhat Ziganshin	2015	Baltic Fleet	One additional vessel reported under construction; status unclear
Project 23040	23040	Boat of comprehensive rescue support	25	Valebtin Gordeev	2015	Baltic Fleet	One additional vessel reported under construction; status unclear
Project 23040	23040	Boat of comprehensive rescue support	25	RVK-2164	2015	Baltic Fleet	One additional vessel reported under construction; status unclear
Project 23040	23040	Boat of comprehensive rescue support	25	Vitaly Marienko	2015	Baltic Fleet	One additional vessel reported under construction; status unclear
Project 23040	23040	Boat of comprehensive rescue support	25	Ivan Shvets	2017	Northern Fleet	One additional vessel reported under construction; status unclear
Project 23040	23040	Boat of comprehensive rescue support	25	RVK-1230	2017	Northern Fleet	One additional vessel reported under construction; status unclear
Project 23040	23040	Boat of comprehensive rescue support	25	RVK-1239	2017	Pacific Fleet	One additional vessel reported under construction; status unclear
Project 23040	23040	Boat of comprehensive rescue support	25	RVK-1261	2017	Pacific Fleet	One additional vessel reported under construction; status unclear
Project 23040	23040	Boat of comprehensive rescue support	25	RVK-1264	2020	Pacific Fleet	One additional vessel reported under construction; status unclear
Project 23040	23040	Boat of comprehensive rescue support	25	Alexandr Sheremet	2020	Pacific Fleet	One additional vessel reported under construction; status unclear
Project 23040	23040	Boat of comprehensive rescue support	25	Pavel Simonov	2020	Northern Fleet	One additional vessel reported under construction; status unclear
Project 23040	23040	Boat of comprehensive rescue support	25	Vladimir Timofeev	2021	Northern Fleet	One additional vessel reported under construction; status unclear
Project 5360	5360	Salvage vessel/ Submersible support	4	Mikhail Rudnitskiy	1978	Northern Fleet	Active as of 2024; reported damaged in collision with deep-water reconnaissance vehicle AS-36; extent of damage unknown
Project 5360	5360	Salvage vessel/ Submersible support	4	Georgiy Koz'min	1979	Pacific Fleet	Active as of 2025
Project 5360	5360	Salvage vessel/ Submersible support	4	Georgiy Titov	1982	Northern Fleet	Active as of 2025
Project 5360	5360	Salvage vessel/ Submersible support	4	Sayany	1983	Black Sea Fleet	Reported in Holland Bay near Sevastopol as of early 2024
El'brus	537	Large submarine salvage vessel	1	Alagez	1989	Pacific Fleet	
Kashtan	141	Salvage vessel/ Submersible support	8	Alexandr Pushkin, SS-750, KIL-927, 143, 158, 164, 498, 168	1986-1989	Baltic, Northern, Black Sea & Pacific Fleets	SS-750 active as of 2023
Belousov	21300	Submarine salvage vessel	1	Igor Belousov	2015	Pacific Fleet	Active as of 2026
Project 23370	23370	Rescue boat	12	Leonid Molchanov	2014	Baltic Fleet	
Project 23370	23370	Rescue boat	12	SMK-2094	2014	Black Sea Fleet	
Project 23370	23370	Rescue boat	12	Valery Rozhdestvensky	2014	Baltic Fleet	
Project 23370	23370	Rescue boat	12	Vladimir Egorov	2014	Baltic Fleet	
Project 23370	23370	Rescue boat	12	SMK-2100	2014	Caspian Flotilla	
Project 23370	23370	Rescue boat	12	SMK-2102	2015	Caspian Flotilla	
Project 23370	23370	Rescue boat	12	SMK-2103	2015	Caspian Flotilla	
Project 23370	23370	Rescue boat	12	SMK-2104	2015	Caspian Flotilla	
Project 23370	23370	Rescue boat	12	SMK-2169	2015	Black Sea Fleet	
Project 23370	23370	Rescue boat	12	SMK-2170	2015	Baltic Fleet	
Project 23370	23370	Rescue boat	12	SMK-2171	2015	Black Sea Fleet	
Project 23370	23370	Rescue boat	12	SMK-2172	2015	Baltic Fleet	
Project 23370	23370M	Rescue boat	3	Spasatel Kononenko	2016	Northern Fleet	
Project 23370	23370M	Rescue boat	3	Vitaliy Teplov	2017	Pacific Fleet	
Project 23370	23370M	Rescue boat	3	SMK-2187	2018	Pacific Fleet	
Project 23370	23370G	Rescue boat	3	Mikhail Kazansky	2019	Baltic Fleet	
Project 23370	23370G	Rescue boat	3	Alexander Firsov	2020	Black Sea Fleet	
Project 23370	23370G	Rescue boat	3	Grigory Shadrin	2021	Northern Fleet	
Tenders (32)
Pelym	1799	Degaussing/Deperming vessel	12		1970-1987		29 vessels built for the Russian Navy; 12 remain in service
Bereza	130	Degaussing/Deperming vessel	12		1984-2001		18 vessels built; 12 remain in service
Malina	2020	Submarine tender	3	PTB-5	1984	Northern Fleet	
Malina	2020	Submarine tender	3	PTB-6	1985	Pacific Fleet	
Malina	2020	Submarine tender	3	PTB-7	1990	Northern Fleet	
Oskol	300/301T/303	Light repair vessel	5	PM-20 (Oskol I)	1963	Northern Fleet	
Oskol	300/301T/303	Light repair vessel	5	PM-68 (Oskol I)	1964	Baltic Fleet	
Oskol	300/301T/303	Light repair vessel	5	PM-21 (Oskol II)	1965	Northern Fleet	
Oskol	300/301T/303	Light repair vessel	5	PM-51 (Modified Oskol)	1968	Northern Fleet	
Oskol	300/301T/303	Light repair vessel	5	PKZ-? (former PM-148; Modified Oskol)	1968	Pacific Fleet	
Tugs (124)
Project 527		Ocean salvage vessel	1	Epron	1959	Black Sea Fleet	Active in 2021, 2022
Okhtenskiy/Goliat	733	Ocean salvage tug	3	SB-4	1959	Black Sea Fleet	Active in 2018
Okhtenskiy/Goliat	733	Ocean salvage tug	3	SB-5	1965	Black Sea Fleet	Active in 2018, 2019, 2021
Okhtenskiy/Goliat	733	Ocean salvage tug	3	SB-9	1964	Northern Fleet	
Pamir/Ingul	1452	Ocean salvage tug	3	Pamir	1974	Northern Fleet	Active as of 2026
Pamir/Ingul	1452	Ocean salvage tug	3	Alatau	1983	Pacific Fleet	Active in 2024
Pamir/Ingul	1452	Ocean salvage tug	3	Altay	1987	Northern Fleet	Active as of 2026
Project P-5757		Ocean salvage/rescue tug	2	Nikolay Chiker	1989	Northern Fleet	Active in 2021
Project P-5757		Ocean salvage/rescue tug	2	Fotiy Krylov	1989	Pacific Fleet	Active as of 2026
Project 745/P		Sea tug/Border patrol units	28		745 (Salvage tugs: 1972-1991); 745P (Border patrol units: 1974-2006)		43 built; 28 (745 & 745P) remaining in service; P variants armed & Coast Guard assigned
Project 745 MB	745 MB	Sea salvage tug	1	MB-12	2011	Northern Fleet	
Project 745 MBS	745 MBS	Sea salvage tug	1	Viktor Koneckiy	2013	Baltic Fleet	Active in 2021
Project 563	563	Sea salvage tug	4	MB-15	1977	Northern Fleet	
Project 563	563	Sea salvage tug	4	SB-931? (former MB-18)	1977	Pacific Fleet	May have decommissioned in 2021
Project 563	563	Sea salvage tug	4	MB-105	1978	Pacific Fleet	
Project 563	563	Sea salvage tug	4	Yakov Grebelskiy (former MB-119)	1978	Baltic Fleet	Active in 2021
Project 714	714	Sea rescue tug	7	SB-365, Yevgeniy Khorov, SB-36, SB-521, SB-522, SB-523, SB-524	1982-83		Yevgeniy Khorov active in 2019, SB-36 in 2022
Neftegaz	V92	Sea salvage tug	1	Kalar	1990	Pacific Fleet	Active in 2021
Project 712 Sliva	712	Sea rescue tug	4	SB-406	1984	Northern Fleet	Active in 2020
Project 712 Sliva	712	Sea rescue tug	4	SB-408	1984	Pacific Fleet	
Project 712 Sliva	712	Sea rescue tug	4	Yevgeniy Churov	1985	Baltic Fleet	Active in 2019
Project 712 Sliva	712	Sea rescue tug	4	Shakhter	1985	Black Sea Fleet	Active in 2022
Project 22870	22870	Sea tug		SB-45	2014	Caspian Flotilla	
Project 22870	22870	Sea tug		Nikolay Muru	2014	Black Sea Fleet	Active in 2021
Project 22870	22870	Sea tug		SB-738	2016	Caspian Flotilla	
Project 22870	22870	Sea tug		Kapitan Guryev	2018	Black Sea Fleet	
Project 22870	22870	Sea tug		SB-742	2019	Black Sea Fleet	
Project 22870	22870	Sea tug		Mikhail Chekov	2025	Black Sea Fleet	
Project 02790	02790	Sea tug	6	MB-92	2013	Pacific Fleet	
Project 02790	02790	Sea tug	6	MB-93	2013	Pacific Fleet	
Project 02790	02790	Sea tug	6	MB-97	2015	Baltic Fleet	
Project 02790	02790	Sea tug	6	MB-135	2014	Northern Fleet	
Project 02790	02790	Sea tug	6	MB-134	2014	Northern Fleet	
Project 02790	02790	Sea tug	6	MB-96	2015	Baltic Fleet	
Project 02980	02980	Sea tug	5-6	SB-121	2016	Baltic Fleet	Leningradskaya naval base
Project 02980	02980	Sea tug	5-6	SB-123	2016	Baltic Fleet	Baltiysk naval base
Project 02980	02980	Sea tug	5-6	SB-736	2017	Northern Fleet	Belomorskaya naval base
Project 02980	02980	Sea tug	5-6	SB-737	2017	Baltic Fleet	Baltiysk naval base
Project 02980	02980	Sea tug	5-6	Aleksander Frolov	2018-20 ??	Baltic Fleet	Baltiysk; active as of 2025
Project 90600		Harbour tug	26	RB-34	2009	Northern Fleet	
Project 90600		Harbour tug	26	RB-47	2009	Northern Fleet	
Project 90600		Harbour tug	26	RB-48	2009	Northern Fleet	
Project 90600		Harbour tug	26	RB-386	2010	Northern Fleet	
Project 90600		Harbour tug	26	Pomorye	2011	Northern Fleet	
Project 90600		Harbour tug	26	RB-389	2010	Black Sea Fleet	
Project 90600		Harbour tug	26	RB-43	2011	Black Sea Fleet	
Project 90600		Harbour tug	26	RB-45	2011	Black Sea Fleet	
Project 90600		Harbour tug	26	RB-20	2011	Baltic Fleet	
Project 90600		Harbour tug	26	RB-27	2011	Baltic Fleet	
Project 90600		Harbour tug	26	RB-42	2011	Baltic Fleet	
Project 90600		Harbour tug	26	RB-391	2012	Black Sea Fleet	
Project 90600		Harbour tug	26	RB-394	2012	Baltic Fleet	
Project 90600		Harbour tug	26	RB-395	2012	Baltic Fleet	
Project 90600		Harbour tug	26	RB-392	2013	Black Sea Fleet	
Project 90600		Harbour tug	26	RB-398	2013	Black Sea Fleet	
Project 90600		Harbour tug	26	RB-399	2013	Northern Fleet	
Project 90600		Harbour tug	26	RB-400	2013	Northern Fleet	
Project 90600		Harbour tug	26	RB-401	2013	Baltic Fleet	
Project 90600		Harbour tug	26	RB-412	2014	Black Sea Fleet	
Project 90600		Harbour tug	26	RB-413	2014	Baltic Fleet	
Project 90600		Harbour tug	26	RB-365	2015	Black Sea Fleet	
Project 90600		Harbour tug	26	RB-366	2015	Baltic Fleet	
Project 90600		Harbour tug	26	RB-397	2017	Caspian Flotilla	
Project 90600		Harbour tug	26	RB-393	2017	Baltic Fleet	
Project 90600		Harbour tug	26	Izhorets	2024	Baltic Fleet	
Project 16609		Harbour tug	15	RB-367, 368, 369, 2180, Delfin, Kasatka, Belukha, RB-402, 403, 404, 405, 406, 407, 2186, Afalina	2012–2018	Northern, Pacific, Baltic & Black Sea Fleets	
Project 23470		Sea tug	4	Sergei Balk	2020	Black Sea Fleet	Plus 3 building/fitting out as of 2026; Andrey Stepanov reported active as of 2026
Project 23470		Sea tug	4	Andrey Stepanov	2020	Pacific Fleet	Plus 3 building/fitting out as of 2026; Andrey Stepanov reported active as of 2026
Project 23470		Sea tug	4	Kapitan Nayden	2022	Black Sea Fleet	Plus 3 building/fitting out as of 2026; Andrey Stepanov reported active as of 2026
Project 23470		Sea tug	4	Kapitan Sergeyev	2026	Pacific Fleet	Plus 3 building/fitting out as of 2026; Andrey Stepanov reported active as of 2026
Plamya	1893	Firefighting tugboat	6	PZhS-96, PZhS-123, PZhS-209, PZhS-219, PZhS-279, PZhS-282,	1970–1976	Baltic, Black Sea, Pacific Fleets & Caspian Flotilla	PZhS-123 (tasked to the Black Sea Fleet) active in 2022
Fleet oilers (21)
Boris Chilikin	1559V	Large seagoing tanker	3	Sergey Osipov	1973	Northern Fleet	Active as of 2026
Boris Chilikin	1559V	Large seagoing tanker	3	Ivan Bubnov	1975	Black Sea Fleet	8 month deployment in the Mediterranean in 2020–21
Boris Chilikin	1559V	Large seagoing tanker	3	Boris Butoma	1978	Pacific Fleet	Active as of 2025
Dora		Medium seagoing tanker	1	Istra	1942	Black Sea Fleet	Transferred to the Soviet Union from Germany as part of war reparations; still reported in commission as of 2021 though possibly inactive
Olekma	6404	Medium seagoing tanker	1	Iman	1966	Black Sea Fleet	Active as of 2021
Altay	160	Medium seagoing tanker	4	Kola	1967	Baltic Fleet	Active as of 2021; collision, slight damage in 2021
Altay	160	Medium seagoing tanker	4	Yel'nya	1968	Baltic Fleet	Active as of 2026
Altay	160	Medium seagoing tanker	4	Izhora	1970	Pacific Fleet	Active in 2022
Altay	160	Medium seagoing tanker	4	Ilim	1972	Pacific Fleet	Status unclear
Dubna		Medium seagoing tanker	3	Dubna	1974	Northern Fleet	In refit as of 2021
Dubna		Medium seagoing tanker	3	Irkut	1975	Pacific Fleet	Active as of 2024
Dubna		Medium seagoing tanker	3	Pechenga	1979	Pacific Fleet	Active as of 2026
Kaliningradneft	REF-675	Medium seagoing tanker	2	Kama	1982	Northern Fleet	Active as of 2026
Kaliningradneft	REF-675	Medium seagoing tanker	2	Vyazma	1982	Northern Fleet	Active as of 2025
Project 23130	23130	Medium seagoing tanker	2	Akademik Pashin	2019	Northern Fleet	Active as of 2026
Project 23130	23130	Medium seagoing tanker	2	Vasily Nikitin	2025	Black Sea Fleet	Tasked to the Black Sea Fleet but commissioned in the Baltic in April 2025; likely to operate in the Baltic/Atlantic for the duration of the Russo-Ukraine War
Project 03180	03180	Small seagoing tanker	4	Umba	2014	Northern Fleet	
Project 03180	03180	Small seagoing tanker	4	Pecha	2014	Northern Fleet	
Project 03180	03180	Small seagoing tanker	4	VTN-73	2014	Black Sea Fleet	
Project 03180	03180	Small seagoing tanker	4	Alexandr Grebenschikov	2014	Baltic Fleet	
Project 03182	03182	Small seagoing tanker	2	Vice-admiral Paromov	2021	Black Sea Fleet	Active as of 2024; part of the Black Sea Fleet but deployed in the Mediterranean/Baltic since 2022
Project 03182	03182	Small seagoing tanker	2	Valentin Rykov	2026	Black Sea Fleet	Entered service 2026, but operating in the Baltic
Trial support vessels (2)
Project 11982	11982	Trial vessel/Research vessel	2	Seliger	2012	Black Sea Fleet	Third vessel (Ilmen) may have entered service
Project 11982	11982	Trial vessel/Research vessel	2	Ladoga	2018	Baltic Fleet	Third vessel (Ilmen) may have entered service
Hydrographic ships (71)
Project 860		Hydrographic ship	1	Gigrometer	1965	Baltic Fleet	
Project 861		Hydrographic ship	c. 6		1968–1973		
Project 852	852	Hydrographic ship	1	Admiral Vladimirskiy	1975	Baltic Fleet	Active as of 2025
Yug	862	Hydrographic ship	11	Marshal Gelovani, Donuzlav, Nikolay Matusevich, Gals, Pegas, Vice-Admiral Vorontsov, Vizir, Temryuk, Gorizont, Senezh	1979–1983	Pacific, Northern, Baltic and Black Sea Fleets	Marshal Gelovani active in 2021,Donuzlav active in 2022, Gorizont active as of 2021
Project 865	865	Hydrographic ship	2	Sibiryakov	1990	Baltic Fleet	Active in 2021
Project 865	865	Hydrographic ship	2	Romuald Muklevich	1991	Northern Fleet	Modernized in 2020
Project 872		Hydrographic ship	19		1978–1983	Baltic, Black Sea, Pacific & Northern Fleets	23 vessels originally; 3 decommissioned as of early 2020s; one (Petr Gradov) identified as Project 872E vessel
Project 872E		Special ecologistic ship	1	Petr Gradov	1980	Black Sea Fleet	
Project 19910	19910	Small hydrographic vessel	5	Nikolay Skosyrev, Yakov Lapushkin, Vaygach, Alexandr Rogotskiy, Vasily Bubnov	2007–2025	Northern Fleet, Baltic Fleet	
Project V19910		Hydrographic ship	1	Viktor Faleev	2013		
Project 23370Г	23370Г	Hydrographic catamaran-type boat	3	Mikhail Kazanskii, Alexander Firsov, Georgiy Shadrin	2019–2021	Baltic Fleet, Black Sea Fleet, Northern Fleet	
Project 20180/20181	20180	Ocean rescue tug/Search and rescue ship/armament transport	2	Zvezdochka (20180) & Akademik Kovalev (20181)	Since 2010/2015	Northern & Pacific Fleets	20181 vessels classed as "armament transports"; additional 20181 vessel (Akademik Makeev) fitting out; vessels employed for testing Poseidon nuclear weapons systems
Project 20183	20183	Oceanographic research search and rescue ice-way tug	1	Akademik Aleksandrov	2020	Northern Fleet	Used for testing Poseidon
Project 02670	02670	Oceanographic research ship	1	Yevgeniy Gorigledzhan	1983 (2023)	Baltic Fleet	Tug rebuilt into ship for underwater work
Project 19920	19920	Large hydrographic survey boat	12		2008–2022		
Project 23040G	23040G	Large hydrographic survey boat	5	Georgy Zima, Aleksandr Yevlanov, Vladimir Kozitsky, Boris Slobodnik, Leonid Senchura	2018–2021	Baltic Fleet, Black Sea Fleet, Northern Fleet	
Training ships (3)
Project 887	887	Training ship	2	Smolnyy	1976	Baltic Fleet	Active as of 2025
Project 887	887	Training ship	2	Perekop	1977	Baltic Fleet	Active as of 2026
Project 14400	14400	Training ship	1	Nikolai Kamov	2025	Black Sea Fleet	Delivered 2025
Museum ships (1)
Aurora		Museum ship with active crew, formerly armored cruiser	1	Aurora	1897		

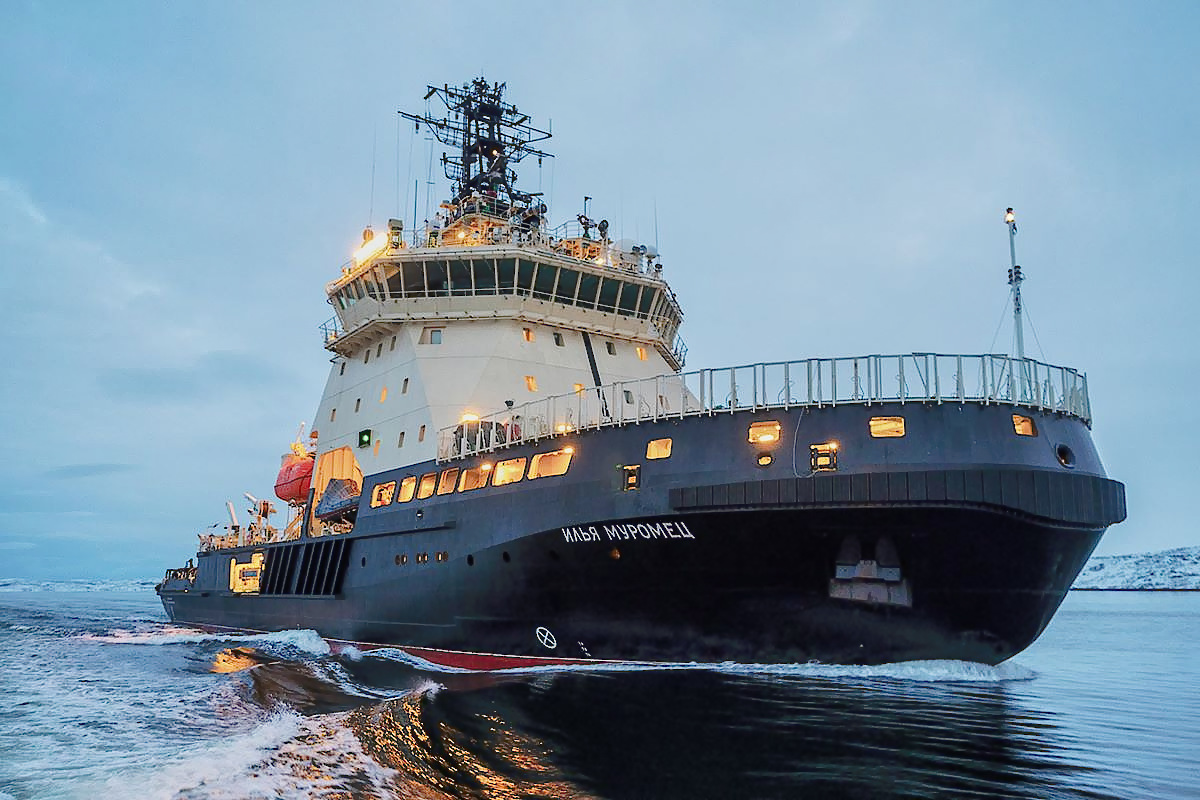
Ilya Muromets (Project 21180)

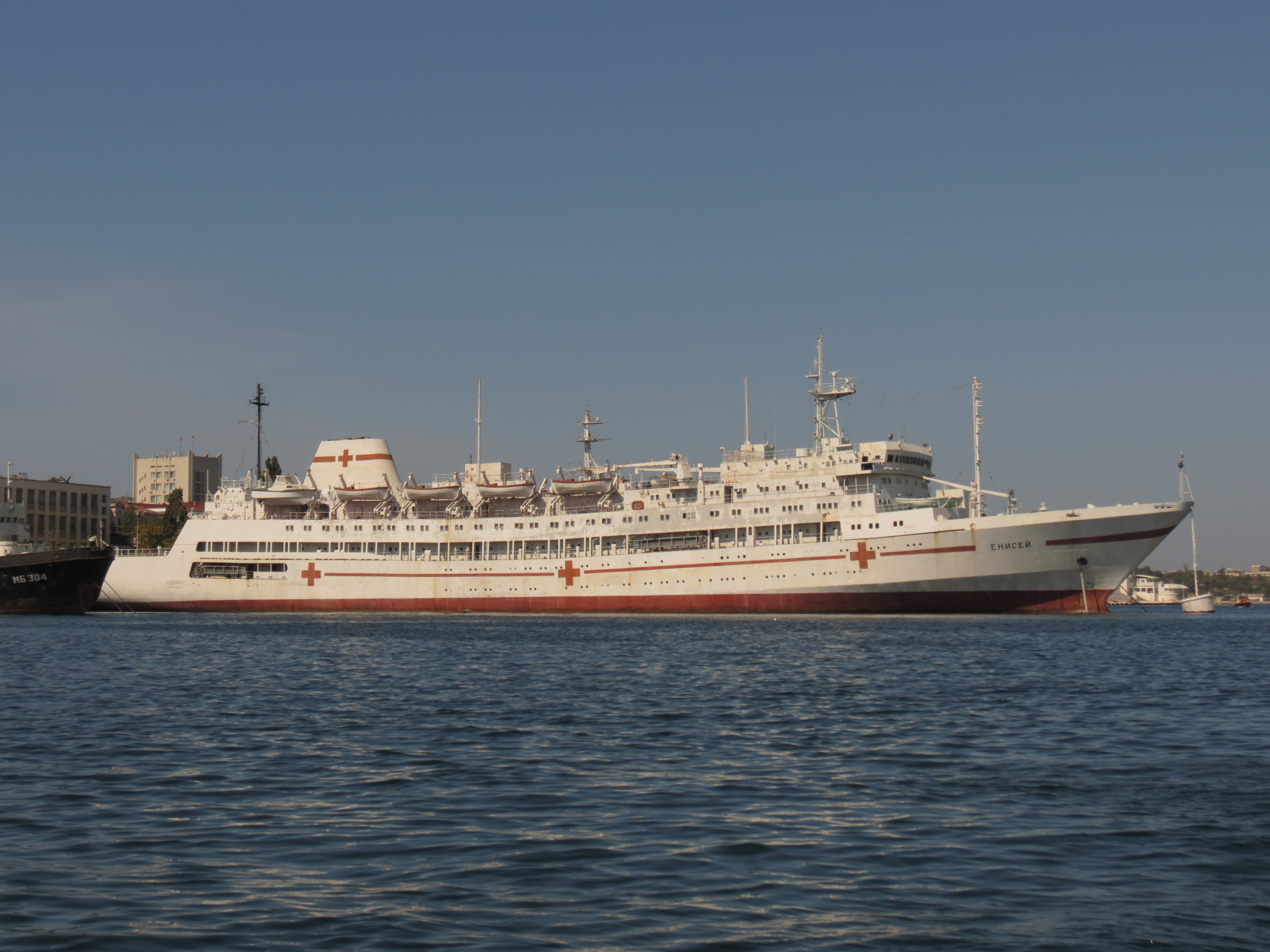
Yenisey (Ob class)

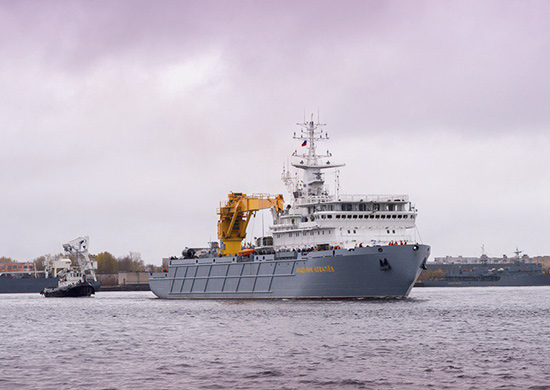
Akademik Kovalev (Project 20181)

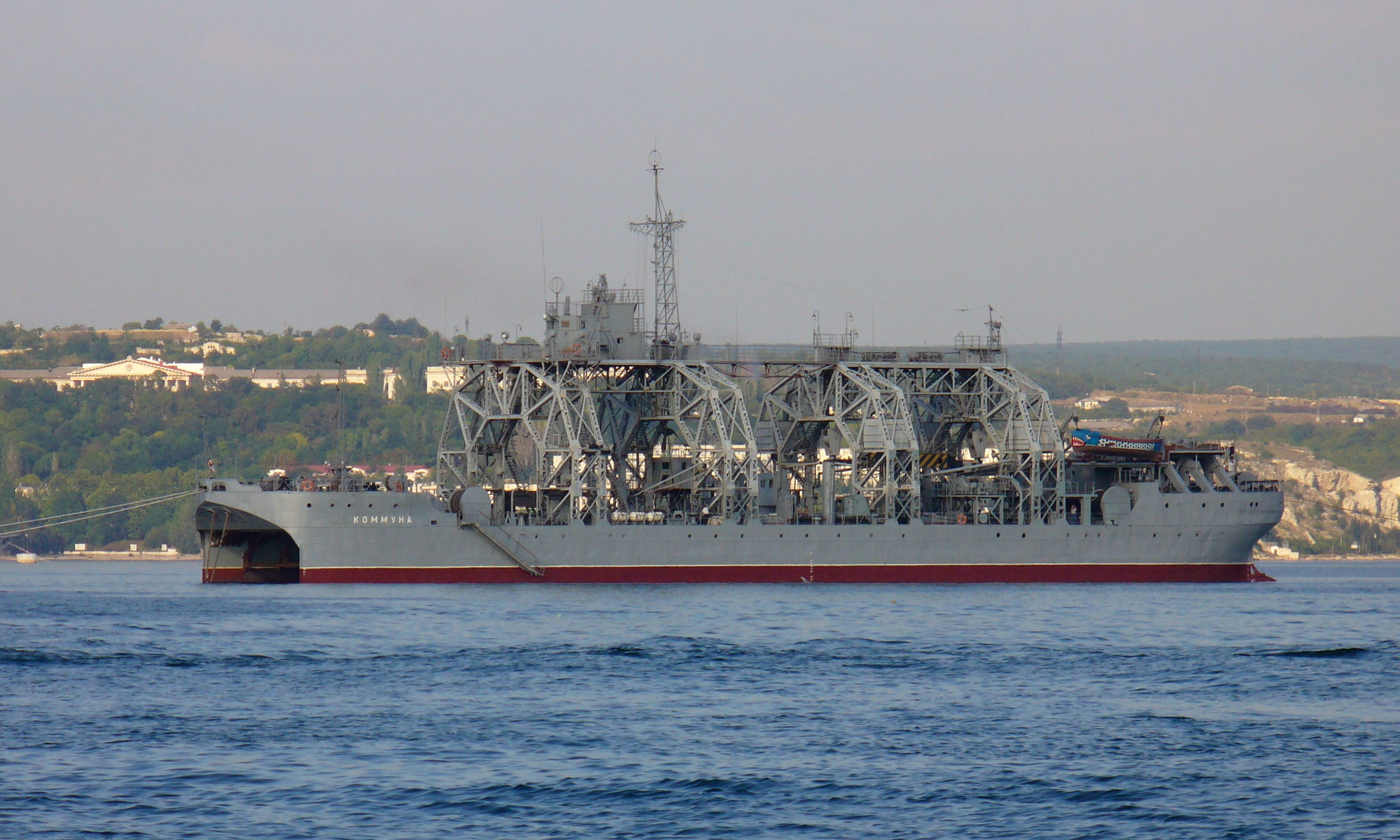
Kommuna is the world's oldest (apart from ceremonial or museum ships) active duty naval vessel

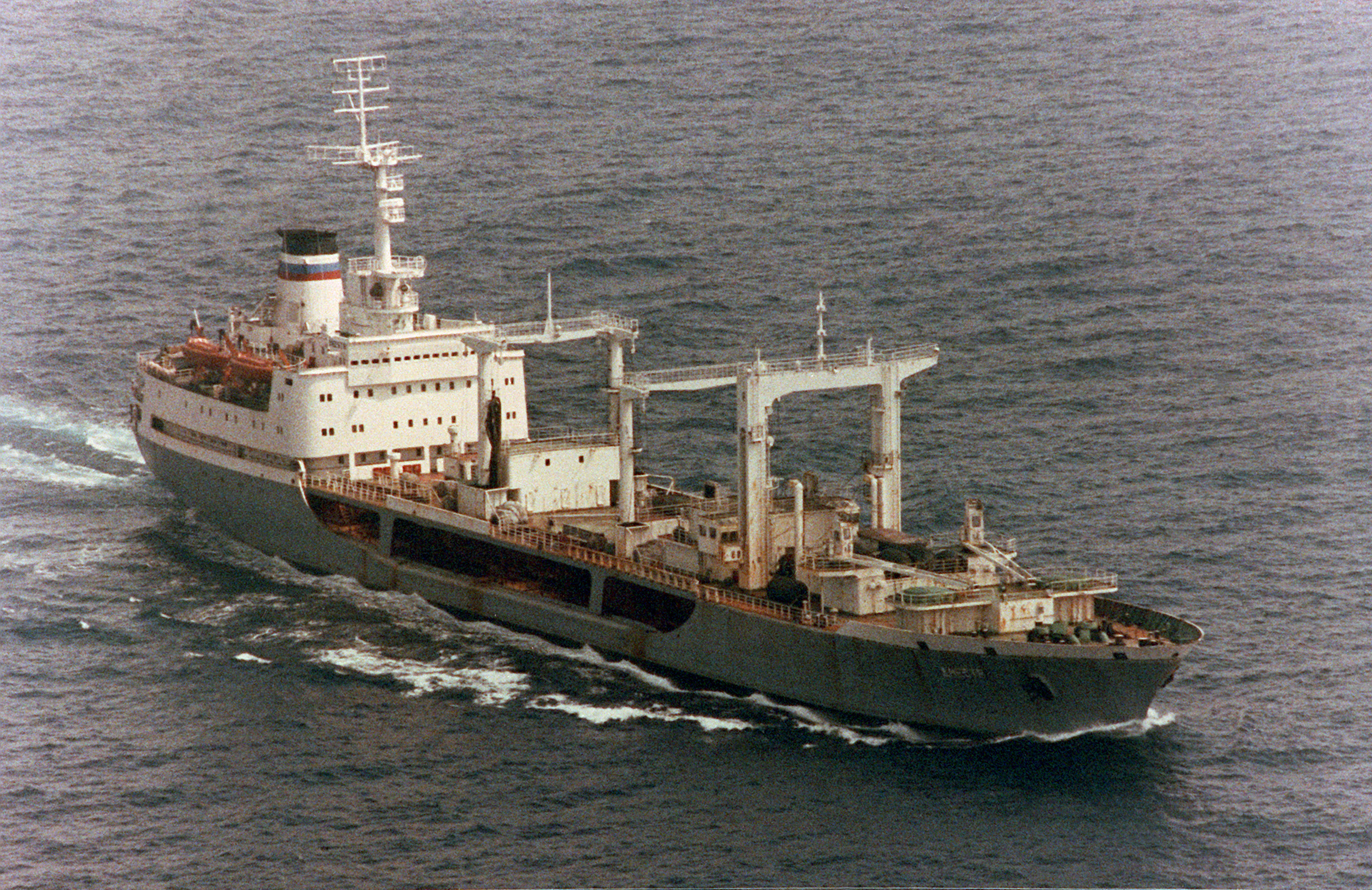
Dnestr (Boris Chilikin class)

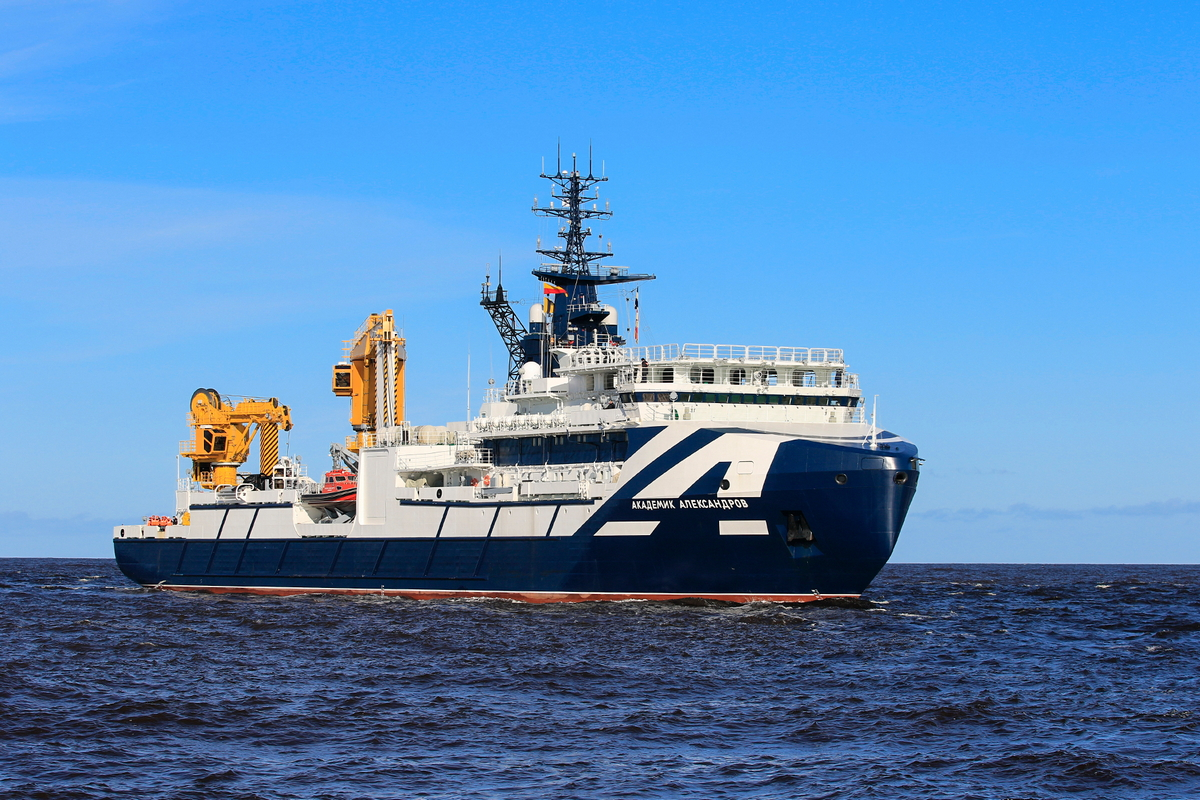
Akademik Alexandrov (Project 20183)

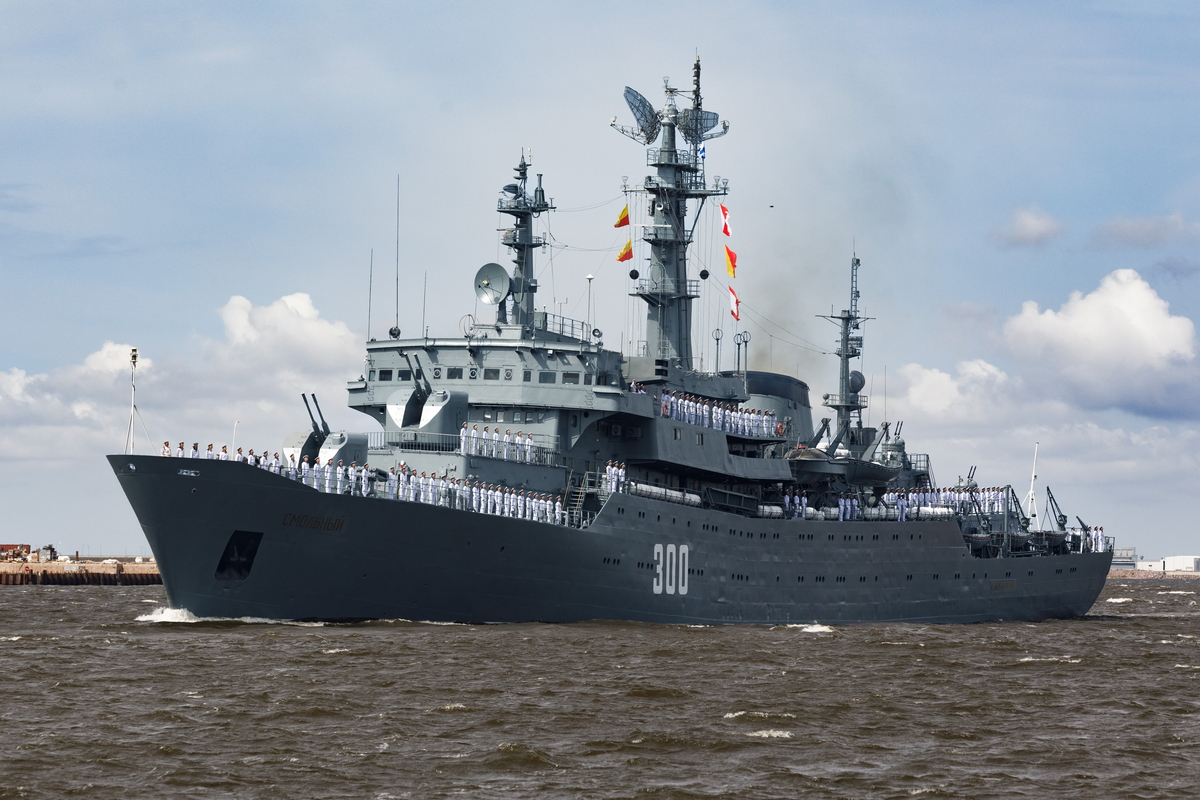
Smolnyy (Project 887)

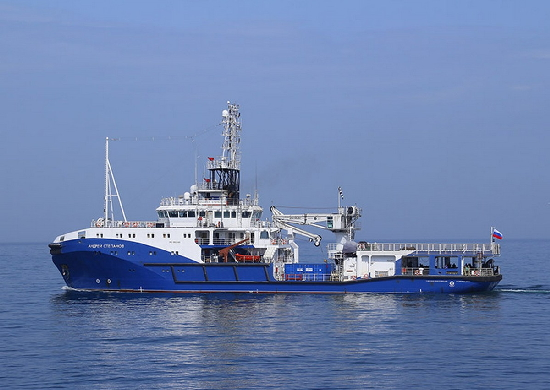
Andrey Stepanov (Project 23470)

== Ships and submarines ordered or under construction ==
(Summary: c. 18 submarines; c. 40 surface warships - 26 major/minor surface combatants; 5 amphibious vessels; 4 Patrol vessels/boats; 5 mine countermeasures vessels - & 2 special purpose intelligence vessels and various other auxiliaries)

- 4 Ballistic missile submarines
- 5 Nuclear-powered attack submarines
- 7 Diesel/electric attack submarines
- 2 Special-purpose submarines
- 7 Frigates
- 19 Corvettes
- 2 Amphibious assault ships
- 3 Landing ships
- 2 Patrol ships
- 2 Patrol boats
- 5 Mine countermeasures vessels
- 2 Special-purpose (intelligence) ships
- Several other auxiliaries of various types

=== Ballistic missile submarines ===
Class	Image	Pennant number	Name	Laid down	Launched	Estimated Commission	Fleet	Note
Project 955A; Borei-A	Borei-A class							
Project 955A; Borei-A	Borei-A class		Knyaz Potemkin	23 August 2021		2028?	Northern Fleet	Under construction
Project 955A; Borei-A	Borei-A class		Dmitry Donskoy	23 August 2021	2026	2026	Northern Fleet	Under construction
Project 955A; Borei-A	Borei-A class		?	?		2030/31?	Pacific?	Both planned/ordered
Project 955A; Borei-A	Borei-A class		?	?		2030/31?	Northern?	Both planned/ordered

=== Nuclear-powered attack submarines ===
Class	Image	Hull number	Name	Laid down	Launched	Estimated Commission	Fleet	Note
Project 885M; Yasen-M	Yasen-M class		Perm	29 July 2016	27 March 2025		Pacific Fleet	Sea trials in the Northern Fleet operational area as of mid-2025
Project 885M; Yasen-M	Yasen-M class		Ulyanovsk	28 July 2017	28 July 2026	2026/27	Northern Fleet	Fitting out
Project 885M; Yasen-M	Yasen-M class		Voronezh	20 July 2020			Northern Fleet	Under construction
Project 885M; Yasen-M	Yasen-M class		Vladivostok	20 July 2020			Pacific Fleet	Under construction
Project 885M; Yasen-M	Yasen-M class		Murmansk	17 June 2026			Likely Northern	Under construction; Up to two more planned

=== Conventional attack submarines ===
Class	Image	Hull number	Name	Laid down	Launched	Estimated Commission	Fleet	Note
Project 677; Lada	Lada class		Vologda	12 June 2022			Northern Fleet	Under Construction
Project 677; Lada	Lada class		Yaroslavl	12 June 2022			Northern Fleet	Under Construction
Project 677; Lada	Lada class		TBA	?			Northern	Ordered; about nine submarines of the class may be planned
Project 636.3; Improved Kilo	Improved Kilo class		Petrozavodsk	2024/25?		?	Baltic Fleet (or Northern Fleet?)	Reported to have started construction
Project 636.3; Improved Kilo	Improved Kilo class		Mariupol	2024/25?		?	Baltic Fleet (or Northern Fleet?)	Reported to have started construction
Project 636.3; Improved Kilo	Improved Kilo class		Donetsk	?		?	Baltic Fleet (or Northern Fleet?)	Both reported as ordered; up to total of six new submarines of the class may be planned; additional submarines with names of Kherson & Zaporizhia reported
Project 636.3; Improved Kilo	Improved Kilo class		Luhansk	?		?	Baltic Fleet (or Northern Fleet?)	Both reported as ordered; up to total of six new submarines of the class may be planned; additional submarines with names of Kherson & Zaporizhia reported

=== Special purpose submarines ===
Class	Image	Hull number	Name	Laid down	Launched	Estimated Commission	Fleet	Note
Project 09851			Khabarovsk	27 July 2014	1 November 2025	2026/27	Pacific Fleet	Sea trials as of August 2026 designed to carry the Poseidon nuclear torpedo
Project 09853			Orenburg	Fall 2025		?	?	Under construction; described as Project 09853 unit; another 09851 or 09853 submarine planned

=== Frigates ===
Class	Image	Hull number	Name	Laid down	Launched	Estimated Commission	Fleet	Note
Project 22350; Admiral Gorshkov	Admiral Gorshkov class		Admiral Isakov	14 November 2013	27 September 2024	2027	Pacific Fleet	Fitting out
Project 22350; Admiral Gorshkov	Admiral Gorshkov class		Admiral Amelko	23 April 2019	14 August 2025	2028	Pacific Fleet	Fitting out
Project 22350; Admiral Gorshkov	Admiral Gorshkov class		Admiral Chichagov	23 April 2019			Northern Fleet	Under construction
Project 22350; Admiral Gorshkov	Admiral Gorshkov class		Admiral Yumashev	20 July 2020			Northern Fleet	Under construction
Project 22350; Admiral Gorshkov	Admiral Gorshkov class		Admiral Spiridonov	20 July 2020			Northern Fleet	Under construction
Project 22350; Admiral Gorshkov	Admiral Gorshkov class		Admiral Gromov	14 May 2026		Projected 2029?	Northern Fleet	Under construction
Project 22350; Admiral Gorshkov	Admiral Gorshkov class		Admiral Vysotsky	Projected 2026		Projected 2029?	Pacific Fleet	Ordered

=== Corvettes ===
Class	Image	Hull number	Name	Laid down	Launched	Estimated Commission	Fleet	Note
Project 22800; Karakurt	Karakurt class		Kozelsk	10 May 2016	9 October 2019	2026?	Baltic Fleet	Reported on "tests" as of 2024; potential vulnerability to attack due to construction at the More (Feodosiya) shipyard in Crimea
Project 22800; Karakurt	Karakurt class		Askold	18 November 2016	21 September 2021	Originally 2024 (not yet commissioned when attacked)	Black Sea Fleet	Attacked in a Ukrainian cruise missile strike on the port Kerch on 4 November 2023; heavily damaged, possibly destroyed; Some reports suggest that repairs were being attempted as of late 2023.
Project 22800; Karakurt	Karakurt class		Okhotsk	17 March 2017	29 October 2019	2028	Black Sea Fleet	Fitting out
Project 22800; Karakurt	Karakurt class		Vikhr	19 December 2017	13 November 2019	2030	Black Sea Fleet	Fitting out
Project 22800; Karakurt	Karakurt class		Rzhev	1 July 2019	27 September 2023	2026	Pacific Fleet	On sea trials as of 2025
Project 22800; Karakurt	Karakurt class		Udomlya	1 July 2019	27 September 2023	2026	Pacific Fleet	Fitting out
Project 22800; Karakurt	Karakurt class		Shtorm	26 December 2019	1 July 2026		Pacific Fleet	Fitting out
Project 22800; Karakurt	Karakurt class		Pavlovsk?	29 July 2020			Pacific Fleet	Under construction; name Uragan also reported for this vessel
Project 20380; Steregushchiy	Steregushchiy class		Strogiy	20 February 2015			Black Sea	Under Construction
Project 20380; Steregushchiy	Steregushchiy class		Groznyy	23 August 2021	23 October 2026		Pacific Fleet	Fitting out
Project 20380; Steregushchiy	Steregushchiy class		Bravyy	29 September 2021			Pacific Fleet	Under construction
Project 20385; Gremyashchiy	Gremyashchiy class		Provornyy	25 July 2013	September 2019 (relaunch June 2024)	?	Pacific Fleet	Fitting out; severe fire damage December 2021. Re-launched in 2024.
Project 20385; Gremyashchiy	Gremyashchiy class		Buynyy	23 August 2021			Pacific Fleet	Under construction
Project 20385; Gremyashchiy	Gremyashchiy class		Razumnyy	12 June 2022			Pacific Fleet	Under construction
Project 20385; Gremyashchiy	Gremyashchiy class		Bystryy	4 July 2022			Pacific Fleet	Under construction
Project 20385; Gremyashchiy	Gremyashchiy class		Retiviy	9 June 2023			Pacific Fleet	Under construction
Project 12418 Molniya (Tarantul IV)			Stupinets	1990s, resumed latter 2010s	29 July 2024		Caspian Flotilla	Stupinets reported on sea trials as of 2025; Strelka fitting out; Ukrainian sources report one Tarantul IV struck by drones in July 2026; specific vessel and extent of damage unclear
Project 12418 Molniya (Tarantul IV)			Strelka	1990s, resumed latter 2010s	1 October 2025		Likely Caspian	Stupinets reported on sea trials as of 2025; Strelka fitting out; Ukrainian sources report one Tarantul IV struck by drones in July 2026; specific vessel and extent of damage unclear
Project 20386; Derzkiy	Project 20386		Derzkiy	28 October 2016	March 2021		Black Sea	Under construction/Fitting out

=== Amphibious assault ships ===
Class	Image	Pennant number	Name	Laid down	Launched	Estimated Commission	Fleet	Note
Project 23900	Project 23900 Amphibious Assault Ship		Ivan Rogov	20 July 2020			Pacific Fleet	Both being constructed at the Zaliv Shipbuilding Yard in Crimea, with potential vulnerability to attack
Project 23900	Project 23900 Amphibious Assault Ship		Mitrofan Moskalenko	20 July 2020			Black Sea	Both being constructed at the Zaliv Shipbuilding Yard in Crimea, with potential vulnerability to attack

=== Landing ships ===
Class	Image	Hull number	Name	Laid down	Launched	Estimated Commission	Fleet	Note
Project 11711; Ivan Gren	Ivan Gren class		Vladimir Andreyev	23 April 2019	30 May 2025	2026	Pacific Fleet	Modified and upgraded project 11711 design; up to seven additional vessels of the type may be planned
Project 11711; Ivan Gren	Ivan Gren class		Vasily Trushin	23 April 2019	2025?	2026	Pacific Fleet	Modified and upgraded project 11711 design; up to seven additional vessels of the type may be planned
Project 11711; Ivan Gren	Ivan Gren class		Sergei Kabanov	8 July 2025				Modified and upgraded project 11711 design; up to seven additional vessels of the type may be planned

- Additional Project 02510 BK-16 and Project 02450 BK-10 fast assault boats may also be in production, particularly for the Black Sea Fleet

=== Patrol ships ===
Class	Image	Hull number	Name	Laid down	Launched	Estimated Commission	Fleet	Note
Project 23550	Russian patrol ship Ivan Papanin		Nikolai Zubov	27 November 2019	25 December 2024			Fitting out
Project 22160	Project 22160 corvette		Nikolay Sipyagin	13 January 2018			Black Sea Fleet	Under construction

=== Patrol Boats ===
Class	Image	Hull Number	Name	Laid Down	Launched	Estimated Commission	Fleet	Note
Project 21980 Grachonok		994		7 May 2025				Both reportedly under construction
Project 21980 Grachonok		995		7 May 2025				Both reportedly under construction

=== Minesweepers ===
Class	Image	Hull number	Name	Laid down	Launched	Estimated Commission	Fleet	Note
Project 12700; Aleksandrit	Alexandrit class		Semyon Agafonov	18 January 2024				Under construction
Project 12700; Aleksandrit	Alexandrit class		Viktor Korner	16 July 2024				Under construction
Project 12700; Aleksandrit	Alexandrit class		Sergey Preminin	16 May 2025				Under construction
Project 12700; Aleksandrit	Alexandrit class		Leonid Balyakin	29 August 2025				Under construction
Project 12700; Aleksandrit	Alexandrit class		Dmitry Glukhov	24 April 2026				Under construction

=== Special-purpose (intelligence) ships ===
Class	Image	Hull number	Name	Laid down	Launched	Estimated Commission	Fleet	Note
Project 22010	Project 22010		Almaz	9 June 2016	October 2019	November 2026	Pacific Fleet	Undergoing factory trials
Project 22010	Project 22010		Vice-Admiral Burilichev	6 February 2021				Modified Project 22011

=== Other auxiliaries ===
Class	Image	Hull number	Name	Laid down	Launched	Estimated Commission	Fleet	Note
Project 21180M	Project 21180M icebreaker		Svyatogor	1 September 2023	29 October 2026	2027	Northern Fleet	Diesel icebreaker; fitting out
Project 23130	Project 23130 replenishment oiler		Admiral Kotov	2022	5 December 2024			Fitting Out
Project 23130	Project 23130 replenishment oiler		Aleksey Shein	16 March 2023				Laid down
Project 23131		301		26 December 2014				Both under construction, though seemingly proceeding very slowly
Project 23131		302		26 December 2014				Both under construction, though seemingly proceeding very slowly
Project 23630			Argun	18 April 2024				Under construction
Project 23630			Yuri Khaliullin	5 June 2025				Under construction
Project 03182	Project 03182 replenishment oiler		Mikhail Barskov	27 October 2015	27 August 2019		Pacific Fleet	Small sea tanker
Project 03182	Project 03182 replenishment oiler		Boris Averkin	6 February 2018			Pacific Fleet	Small sea tanker
Project 03182R			Leonid Bekrenev	12 June 2022			Northern Fleet	Survey/intelligence vessels
Project 03182R			Boris Bobkov	12 June 2022			Northern Fleet	Survey/intelligence vessels
Project 03182R			Mikhail Nefedov	19 October 2023				Survey/intelligence vessels
Project 03182R			Nikolay Zuykov	19 October 2023				Survey/intelligence vessels
Project 23470	Project 23470 tugboat	413	Kapitan Sergeyev	2016	14 May 2021			Reported to have completed sea trials as of December 2025
Project 23470	Project 23470 tugboat	414	Kapitan Ushakov		14 June 2022			Capsized and sank while fitting out on August 9, 2025; salvage effort reported underway as of June 2026
Project 23470	Project 23470 tugboat	415	Kontr-admiral Pinchuk					Seagoing tug
Project 23470	Project 23470 tugboat		Vladimir Kovalev	2 September 2024				Seagoing tug
Project 11982	Project 11982 research vessel		Ilmen	4 December 2014	5 December 2017			Research/trials vessel
Project 20360M			Gennadiy Dmitriyev	5 May 2017	1 June 2021		Black Sea Fleet	Munitions transport
Project 20360M			Vladimir Pyalov	15 March 2018			Baltic Fleet	Munitions transport
Project 20181	Project 20181 ammunition ship		Akademik Makeev	23 July 2015	14 August 2025		Northern Fleet	Munitions transport

== See also ==
- Future of the Russian Navy
- Lists of currently active military equipment by country
