= Russian corvette Shtil' =

Nanuchka-class corvette of the Soviet Navy

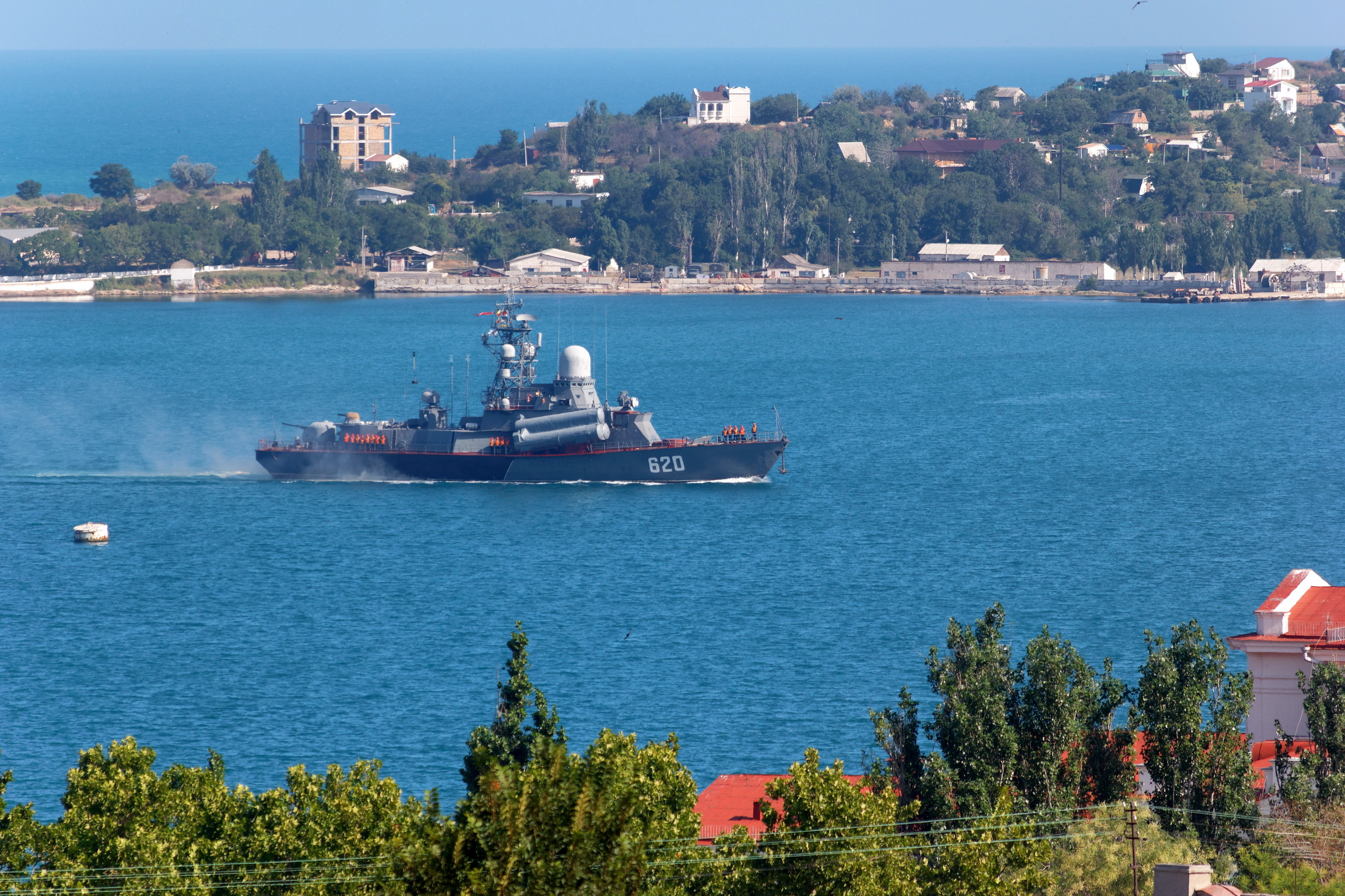
- Shtil' in 2012

History

Russia
- Name: Zyb'; (Зыбь)
- Namesake: Zyb'
- Builder: Almaz Shipyard, Leningrad
- Yard number: 70
- Laid down: 28 June 1976
- Launched: 23 October 1978
- Commissioned: 31 December 1978
- Renamed: Komsomolets Mordovii; (Комсомолец Мордовии)
- Namesake: Komsomolets Mordovii
- Renamed: Shtil'; (Штиль)
- Namesake: Shtil'
- Decommissioned: 16 January 2020
- Identification: See Pennant numbers
- Status: Decommissioned

General characteristics
- Class & type: Nanuchka III-class corvette
- Displacement: 560 long tons (569 t) standard; 660 long tons (671 t) full load
- Length: 59.3 m (194 ft 7 in)
- Beam: 12.6 m (41 ft 4 in)
- Draft: 2.7 m (8 ft 10 in)
- Propulsion: Diesel engines, 30,000 hp (22,371 kW); 3 shaft
- Speed: 32 knots (59 km/h)
- Range: 2,500 nautical miles (4,630 km) at 12 knots (22 km/h; 14 mph); 900 nmi (1,667 km) at 30 knots (56 km/h; 35 mph)
- Complement: 60
- Sensors & processing systems: Radar: Band Stand fire control; Bass Tilt; Peel Pair surface search; Pop group
- Armament: 2 × triple P-120 (SS-N-9 'Siren'); 16 × Kh-35 (SS-N-25 'Switchblade') anti-ship cruise missiles; 1 × 76mm AK-176 gun; 1 × 30mm AK-630 gun; 20 × 4K33 (SA-N-4 'Gecko') surface-to-air missiles

Shtil' was a Nanuchka-class corvette in the Soviet Navy and later the Russian Navy.

== Specifications ==
Small missile ships of the Project 1234 (NATO classification Nanuchka-class) corvette is a series of Soviet small missile ships (MRK) of the third rank built at shipyards of the USSR from 1967 to 1992.

The type consists of three series of subprojects:

- Project 1234, NATO code Nanuchka I
- Project 1234E, NATO code Nanuchka II
- Project 1234.1, NATO code Nanuchka III
- Project 1234.7, NATO code Nanuchka IV

By the name of the project code, the ships received the nickname gadflies in the navy. IRAs of Project 1234 were supplied to the Navy of four countries of the world: the USSR, Algeria, Libya and India. Libyan ones were destroyed during the NATO military operation in the summer of 2011; Indian ships of this project were withdrawn from the Indian Navy in 1999-2004.

The ships of the project were actively operated in all four fleets of the Soviet Navy and during the 1970-1980s carried out combat services in the World Ocean. They left a noticeable mark on the history of Soviet shipbuilding and are currently being gradually withdrawn from the combat strength of the Russian fleet. So, if at the beginning of 2001 in the Russian Navy there were 2 ships of project 1234 and 18 ships of Project 1234.1, then by 2006 all ships of project 1234 were withdrawn from the Navy and only 12 ships of the project remained in Project 1234.1 and 1 ship of Project 1234.7.

== Construction and career ==
Zyb' was laid down on 28 June 1976 at Almaz Shipyard, Leningrad. Launched on 23 October 1978 and commissioned into the Black Sea Fleet on 31 December 1978.

Captain 3rd Rank Viktor Danilovich Kryvtsunov (died in 2004) was appointed the first commander of the Zyb'.

In 1982, after the Komsomol took over the patronage of the fleet, Zyb' was renamed Komsomolets Mordovii.

In 1984, 1989, 1990, 1991, 1993 and 1996, the vessel won prizes of the Navy Main Command for missile training as part of a tactical IBM.

On 15 February 1992, the ship was renamed Shtil'.

On 29 April 1993, she was being repaired at the Balaklava shipyard. Tarligin, at the initiative of the chief of staff of the organizing group of the Ukrainian Navy Captain 2nd Rank Yuri Shalit, an unsuccessful attempt was made to raise the national flag of Ukraine (timed to the 75th anniversary of the raising of the flags of the Ukrainian People's Republic on the ships of the Black Sea Fleet).

On 22 September 1994, the KUG as part of the Shtil' and Zarnitsa MRKs (under the command of the commander of the 166th division, captain 2nd rank A. B. Surov) was declared the best in the Navy in rocket firing at sea targets and was awarded the challenge prize of the Main Committee of the Russian Navy.

On 12 June 1997, Shtil' changed the USSR naval flag to the St. Andrew's flag.

In the period from October 31 to 1 November 1997 MRK Shtil' and Mirazh, missile boats R-109 and R-239 took part in joint exercises with the Ukrainian Navy Fairway of the World '97.

From April 16 to 17 April 1998, the KUG, as part of the Shtil', Mirazh and RKVP Bora, successfully participate in the Black Sea Fleet's spring gathering campaign.

In 2005–2006, the corvette underwent scheduled repairs in Novorossiysk. During the transition of Crimea to Russia, the ship took an active part in the actions of the Black Sea Fleet to block the ships of the Ukrainian Navy in Lake Donuzlav.

In July 2014, the vessel took part in the Black Sea Fleet exercises with the performance of missile firing with the Malakhit complex. Dock repairs in Sevastopol took place from December 2014 to January 2016. On leaving the repair, the ship transferred to the reserve. Currently MRK Shtil'' is in the reserve of the 166th Red Banner Novorossiysk division of MRK of the 41st brigade of the Black Sea Fleet of the Russian Federation.

On 16 January 2020, it was decommissioned from the Black Sea Fleet and sent for disposal.

=== Pennant numbers ===
Date	Pennant number
1982	602
1984	609
1986	605
1990	620
