= Soviet corvette MRK-23 =

Nanuchka-class corvette of the Soviet Navy

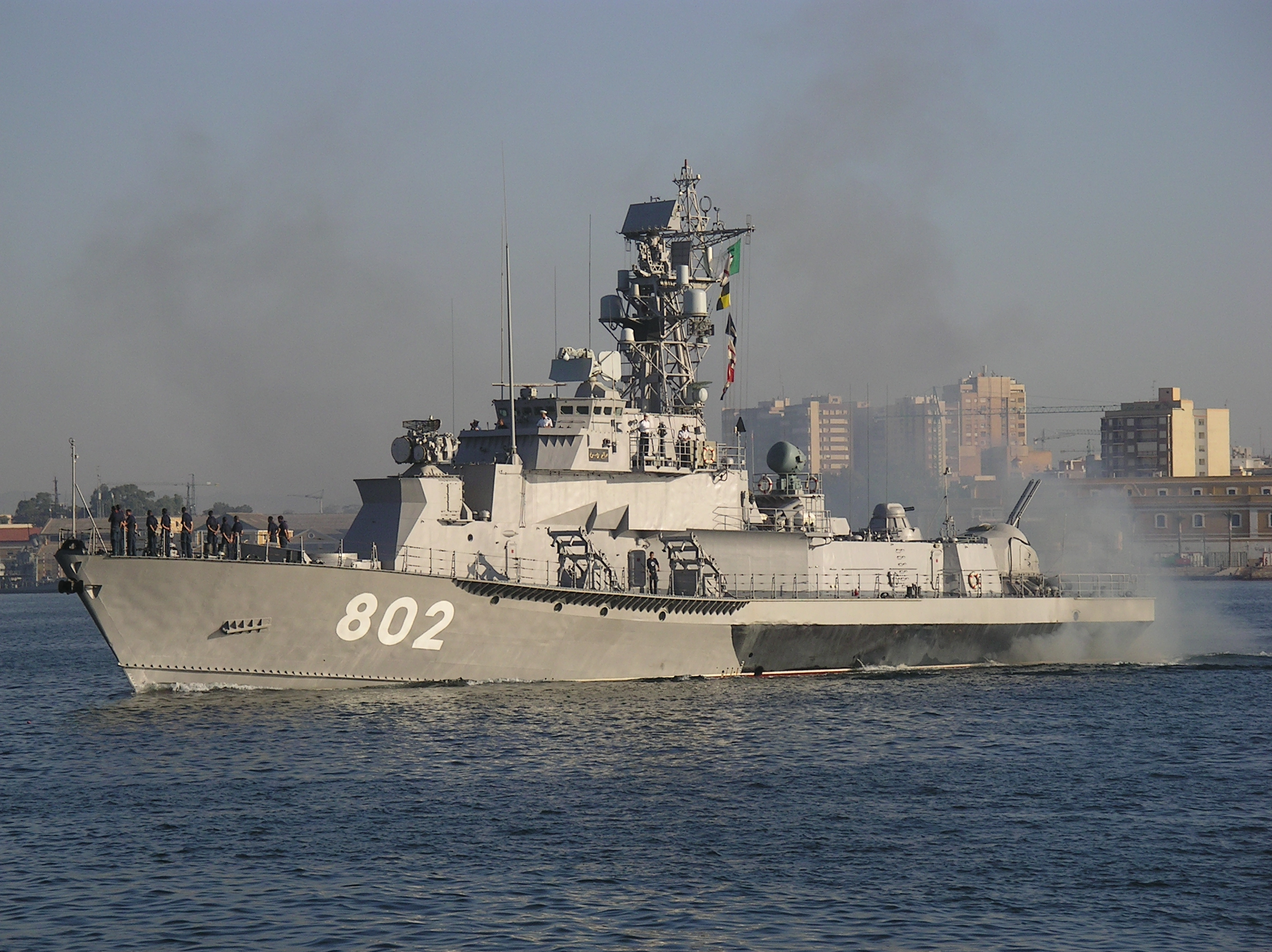
- Salah Rais

History

Soviet Union
- Name: MRK-23
- Builder: Vympel Shipyard, Rybinsk
- Yard number: 202
- Laid down: 17 August 1978
- Launched: 31 July 1980
- Commissioned: 31 October 1980
- Decommissioned: February 1981
- Fate: Transferred to Algeria, 1981

Algeria
- Name: Salah Rais; (صالح ريس)
- Namesake: Salah Rais
- Commissioned: 9 February 1981
- Identification: Pennant number: 802
- Status: Active

General characteristics
- Class & type: Nanuchka II-class corvette
- Displacement: 560 long tons (569 t) standard; 660 long tons (671 t) full load
- Length: 59.3 m (194 ft 7 in)
- Beam: 12.6 m (41 ft 4 in)
- Draft: 2.7 m (8 ft 10 in)
- Propulsion: Diesel engines, 30,000 hp (22,371 kW); 3 shaft
- Speed: 32 knots (59 km/h)
- Range: 2,500 nautical miles (4,630 km) at 12 knots (22 km/h; 14 mph); 900 nmi (1,667 km) at 30 knots (56 km/h; 35 mph)
- Complement: 60
- Sensors & processing systems: Radar: Band Stand fire control; Bass Tilt; Peel Pair surface search; Pop group
- Armament: 2 × triple P-120 (SS-N-9 'Siren'); 4 x P-15 (SS-N-2 'Styx') anti-ship missiles; 20 × 4K33 (SA-N-4 'Gecko') surface-to-air missiles

The MRK-23 is a Nanuchka-class corvette in the Soviet Navy and later transferred in 1981 to the Algerian National Navy as Salah Rais (802).

== Specifications ==
The export modification of the ship was exported to three states friendly to the USSR: India (three units), Algeria (three units) and Libya (four units).

The Indian Navy ordered three small missile ships (according to Indian classification - corvettes) immediately after the Indo-Pakistani war of 1971. Initially, these three ships (Uragan, Priboy, Tide) were intended for the USSR Navy, but were re-equipped according to the project 1234E (code Gadfly-E). The first corvette received in April 1977 by the Indian Navy was the K71 Vijay Durg (formerly Uragan). Algeria initially planned to acquire four MRKs, but later refused to purchase a fourth ship due to financial difficulties. Algerian ships were officially sold to a foreign customer on February 22, 1980. Small missile ships ordered by Libya were transferred to Libya from May 1, 1982 to 1985. The transfer of all export ships to foreign customers took place in Riga.

Since the special design of small missile ships for export was not carried out (as well as the export modification of the Malachite anti-ship missile system), the export modification of the project 1234E MRK was developed on the hull of the basic project 1234, but with a simplified composition of weapons.

The standard / full displacement of the ships of the project 1234E was 560/675 tons, respectively. The dimensions of the hull remained the same as for the project 1234 (except for the draft, which decreased to 2.6 m). The main power plant consisted of three M-507 diesel engines with a capacity of 8600 liters. s, providing a full speed of 34 knots and an economic speed of 12 knots. The cruising range of the 31-knot / economic course reached 900/2500 nautical miles, respectively. The crew consisted of 49 people, including 7 officers. For the first time, air conditioners and an additional refrigerator were installed on export modifications of RTOs to improve the living conditions of the crew.

The armament consisted of two KT-15M paired launchers of P-20 anti-ship missiles (export version of the P-15 Termit anti-ship missiles), one Osa-M air defense missile system, one AK-725 missile launcher, and two PK-16 passive jamming launchers. Instead of the Titanit radar, the old Rangout radar was installed, at the same time the impressive cap from the Titanit radar.

== Construction and career ==
MRK-23 was laid down on 17 August 1978 at Vympel Shipyard, Rybinsk. Launched on 31 July 1980 and commissioned on 31 October 1980.

The ship was decommissioned in February 1981 and was later transferred to the Algerian Navy, where she was renamed Salah Rais and was reclassified into a corvette.

In 1997-2000, she underwent repairs and modernization at the Kronstadt Marine Plant with the strengthening of anti-aircraft and strike weapons.

As of 2021, she remains in the ranks of the Algerian Navy.
