= Russian corvette Razliv =

Nanuchka-class corvette of the Soviet Navy

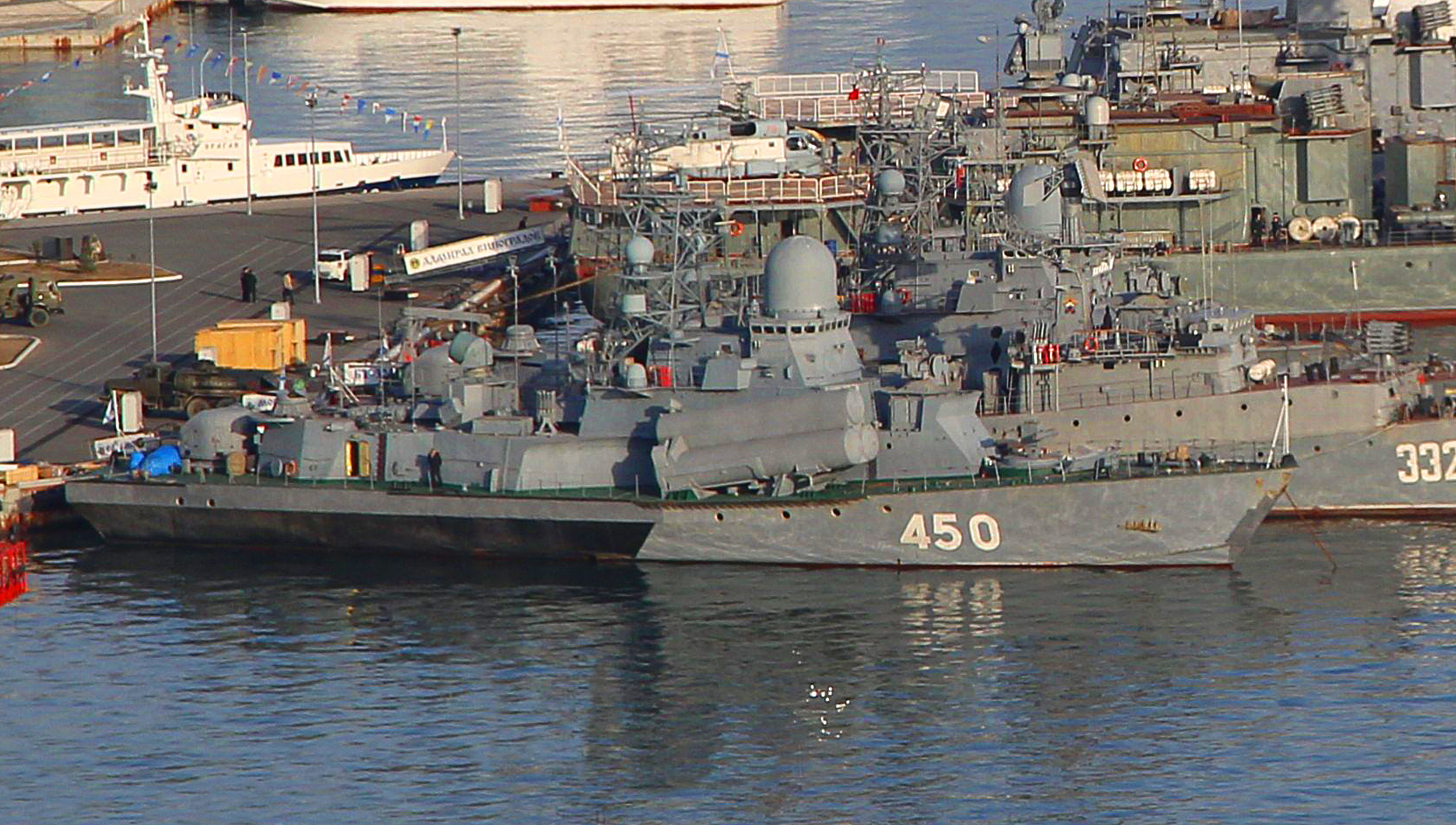
- Razliv in Zolotoy Rog, 2016

History

Russia
- Name: Razliv; (Разлив)
- Namesake: Razliv
- Builder: Vostochnaya Verf, Vladivostok
- Yard number: 1007
- Laid down: 1 November 1986
- Launched: 24 August 1991
- Commissioned: 31 December 1991
- Identification: See Pennant numbers
- Status: Status unclear; possibly decommissioned in 2021

General characteristics
- Class & type: Nanuchka III-class corvette
- Displacement: 560 long tons (569 t) standard; 660 long tons (671 t) full load
- Length: 59.3 m (194 ft 7 in)
- Beam: 12.6 m (41 ft 4 in)
- Draft: 2.7 m (8 ft 10 in)
- Propulsion: Diesel engines, 30,000 hp (22,371 kW); 3 shaft
- Speed: 32 knots (59 km/h)
- Range: 2,500 nautical miles (4,630 km) at 12 knots (22 km/h; 14 mph); 900 nmi (1,667 km) at 30 knots (56 km/h; 35 mph)
- Complement: 60
- Sensors & processing systems: Radar: Band Stand fire control; Bass Tilt; Peel Pair surface search; Pop group
- Armament: 2 × triple P-120 (SS-N-9 'Siren'); 16 × Kh-35 (SS-N-25 'Switchblade') anti-ship cruise missiles; 1 × 76mm AK-176 gun; 1 × 30mm AK-630 gun; 20 × 4K33 (SA-N-4 'Gecko') surface-to-air missiles

Razliv is a Nanuchka-class corvette in the Russian Navy.

== Specifications ==
Small missile ships of the Project 1234 according to NATO classification Nanuchka-class corvette is a series of Soviet small missile ships (MRK) of the 3rd rank built at shipyards of the USSR from 1967 to 1992.

The type consists of three series of subprojects:

- Project 1234, NATO code Nanuchka I
- Project 1234E, NATO code Nanuchka II
- Project 1234.1, NATO code Nanuchka III
- Project 1234.7, NATO code Nanuchka IV

By the name of the project code, the ships received the nickname gadflies in the navy. IRAs of Project 1234 were supplied to the Navy of four countries of the world: the USSR, Algeria, Libya and India. Libyan ones were destroyed during the NATO military operation in the summer of 2011; Indian ships of this project were withdrawn from the Indian Navy in 1999–2004.

The ships of the project were actively operated in all four fleets of the Soviet Navy and during the 1970-1980s carried out combat services in the World Ocean. They left a noticeable mark on the history of Soviet shipbuilding and are currently being gradually withdrawn from the combat strength of the Russian fleet. So, if at the beginning of 2001 in the Russian Navy there were 2 ships of project 1234 and 18 ships of Project 1234.1, then by 2006 all ships of project 1234 were withdrawn from the Navy and only 12 ships of the project remained in Project 1234.1 and 1 ship of Project 1234.7.

== Construction and career ==
Razliv was laid down on 1 November 1986 at Vostochnaya Verf, Vladivostok. Launched on 24 August 1991 and commissioned into the Pacific Fleet on 31 December 1991. The status of the vessel was unclear as of early 2022 and she may have decommissioned in 2021.

=== Pennant numbers ===
Date	Pennant number
2000	450
