= Russian corvette Geyzer =

Nanuchka-class corvette of the Soviet Navy

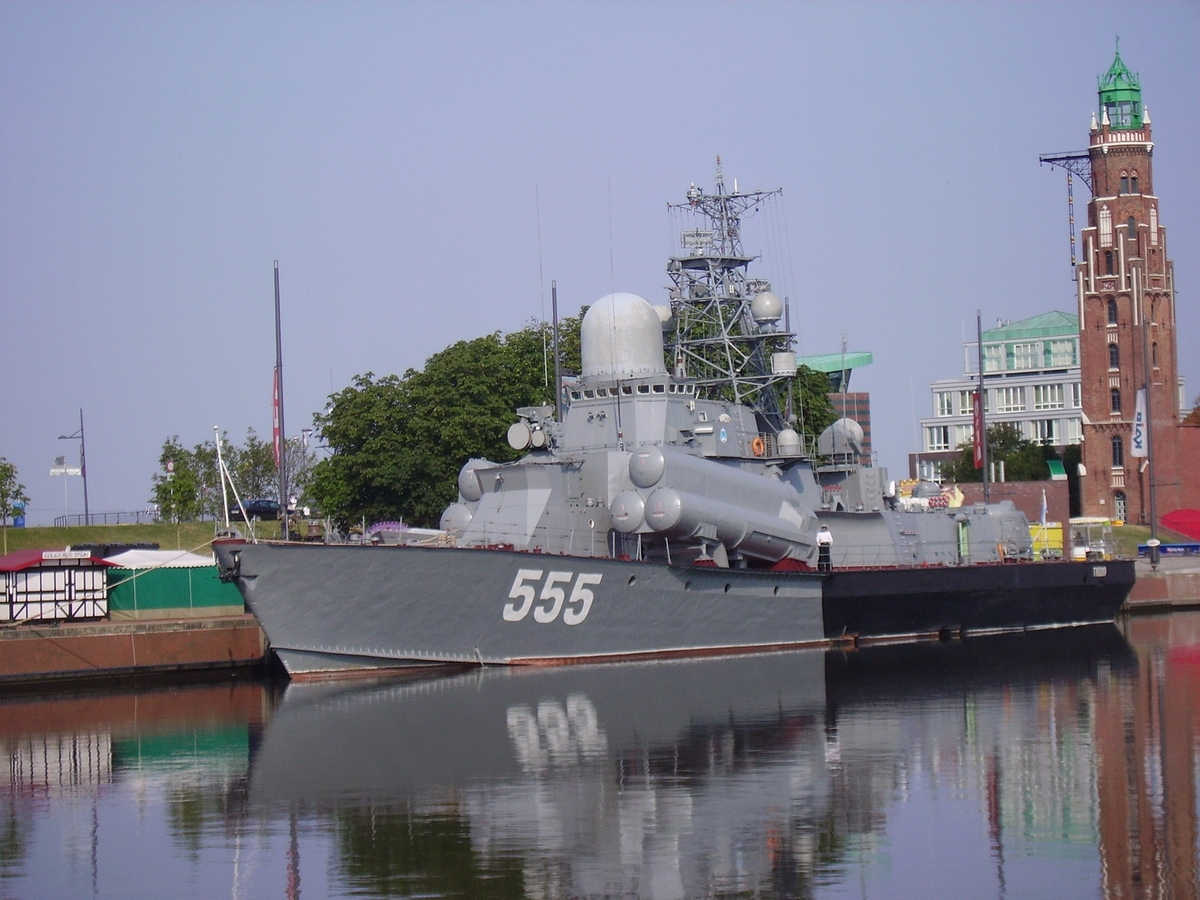
- Geyzer in Bremerhaven, July 2006

History

Russia
- Name: Geyzer; (Гейзер)
- Namesake: Geyzer
- Builder: Almaz Shipyard, Leningrad
- Yard number: 81
- Laid down: 21 December 1987
- Launched: 28 August 1989
- Commissioned: 27 December 1989
- Identification: See Pennant numbers
- Status: Active

General characteristics
- Class & type: Nanuchka III-class corvette
- Displacement: 560 long tons (569 t) standard; 660 long tons (671 t) full load
- Length: 59.3 m (194 ft 7 in)
- Beam: 12.6 m (41 ft 4 in)
- Draft: 2.7 m (8 ft 10 in)
- Propulsion: Diesel engines, 30,000 hp (22,371 kW); 3 shaft
- Speed: 32 knots (59 km/h)
- Range: 2,500 nautical miles (4,630 km) at 12 knots (22 km/h; 14 mph); 900 nmi (1,667 km) at 30 knots (56 km/h; 35 mph)
- Complement: 60
- Sensors & processing systems: Radar: Band Stand fire control; Bass Tilt; Peel Pair surface search; Pop group
- Armament: 2 × triple P-120 (SS-N-9 'Siren'); 16 × Kh-35 (SS-N-25 'Switchblade') anti-ship cruise missiles; 1 × 76mm AK-176 gun; 1 × 30mm AK-630 gun; 20 × 4K33 (SA-N-4 'Gecko') surface-to-air missiles

Geyzer is a Nanuchka-class corvette in the Soviet Navy and later the Russian Navy.

== Specifications ==
Small missile ships of the Project 1234 according to NATO classification Nanuchka-class corvette is a series of Soviet small missile ships (MRK) of the 3rd rank built at shipyards of the USSR from 1967-1992.

The type consists of three series of subprojects:

- Project 1234, NATO code Nanuchka I
- Project 1234E, NATO code Nanuchka II
- Project 1234.1, NATO code Nanuchka III
- Project 1234.7, NATO code Nanuchka IV

By the name of the project code, the ships received the nickname gadflies in the navy. IRAs of Project 1234 were supplied to the Navy of four countries of the world: the USSR, Algeria, Libya and India. Libyan ones were destroyed during the NATO military operation in the summer of 2011; Indian ships of this project were withdrawn from the Indian Navy in 1999-2004.

The ships of the project were actively operated in all four fleets of the Soviet Navy and during the 1970-1980s carried out combat services in the World Ocean. They left a noticeable mark on the history of Soviet shipbuilding and are currently being gradually withdrawn from the combat strength of the Russian fleet. So, if at the beginning of 2001 in the Russian Navy there were 2 ships of project 1234 and 18 ships of Project 1234.1, then by 2006 all ships of project 1234 were withdrawn from the Navy and only 12 ships of the project remained in Project 1234.1 and 1 ship of Project 1234.7.

== Construction and career ==
Geyzer was laid down on 21 December 1987 at Almaz Shipyard, Leningrad. Launched on 28 August 1989 and commissioned into the Baltic Fleet on 27 December 1989.

On 12 August 2016, together with the missile boats Zarechny and Morshansk, Geyzer took part in exercises with artillery firing (from 76 and 30 mm artillery mounts) at targets simulating combat ships and air attack weapons of a conventional enemy, and also performed electronic missile launches at targets imitating a detachment of imaginary enemy ships.

In September 2016, as part of a checkout to the sea, the crew of Geyzer successfully fired a Malachite cruise missile at a naval shield imitating a simulated enemy ship. According to objective control data, the launched cruise missile successfully hit the designated target at a distance of over 50 kilometres (31 mi). Then the corvette launched a target missile for the testing of the frigate Admiral Makarov.

=== Pennant numbers ===
Date	Pennant number
1990	555
