= Russian corvette Smerch =

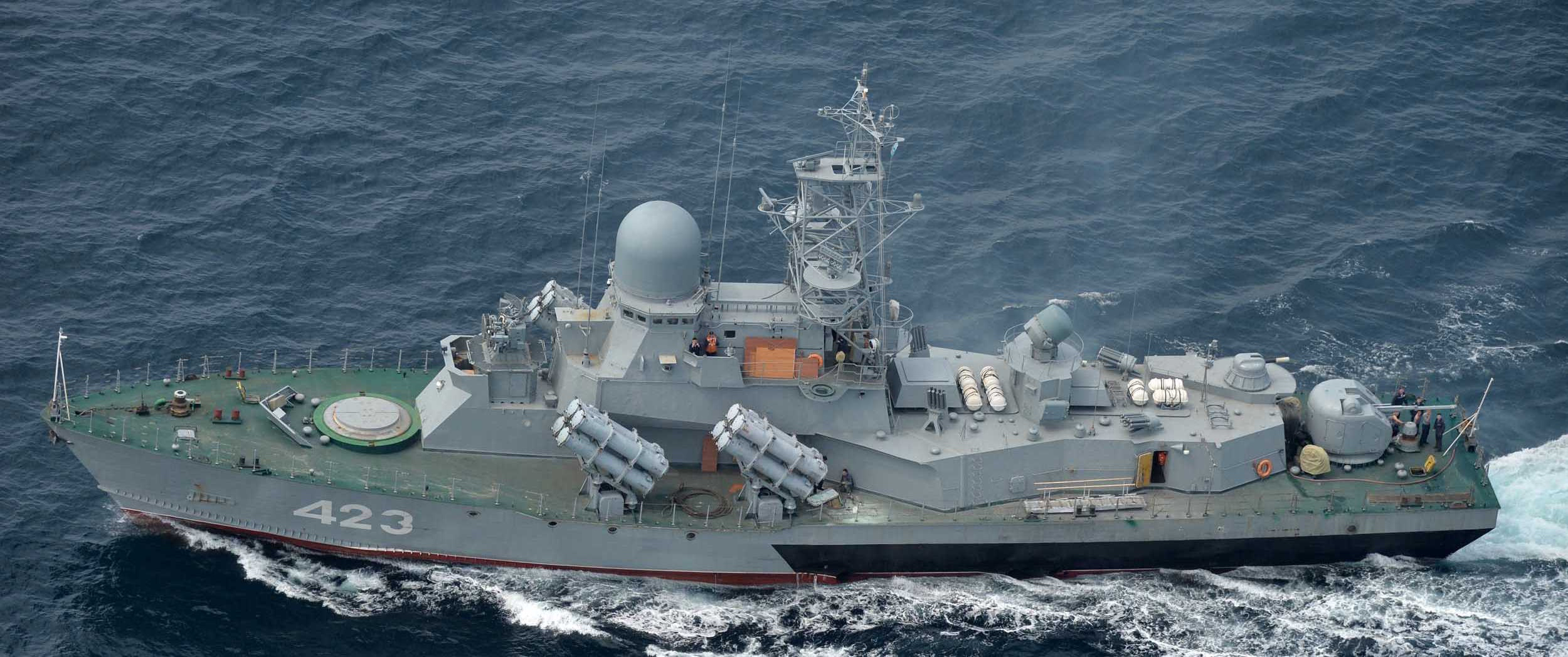
- Smerch showing new missiles and gun in 2019

History

→ Soviet Union → Russia
- Name: Smerch
- Laid down: 1981
- Launched: 1984
- Home port: Petropavlovsk-Kamchatskiy
- Status: Active

General characteristics
- Class & type: Nanuchka III-class corvette
- Displacement: 560 t (551 long tons) standard; 660 t (650 long tons) full load
- Length: 194 ft 7 in (59.31 m)
- Beam: 41 ft 4 in (12.60 m)
- Draught: 12 ft 11 in (3.94 m)
- Propulsion: 3 shaft diesels, 30,000 hp
- Speed: 32 knots (59 km/h; 37 mph)
- Range: 2,500 nautical miles (4,600 km) at 12 knots (22 km/h; 14 mph)
- Complement: 60
- Armament: 4 × 4 Uran/SS-N-25 'Switchblade' SSM (was 2 × 3 SS-N-9); 1 × 2 SA-N-4 SAM (20 missiles); 1 × AK-176MA (76mm turret); 1 × AK-630 (6-barrel 30mm gun)

Smerch (Russian: Смерч, lit. 'Tornado') is a Nanuchka III-class corvette of the Russian Navy. It is classified as a Small Missile Ship/FFL (Малый Ракетный Корабль/МРК) and is currently registered with hull number 423.

She is currently assigned to the Russian Pacific Ocean Fleet and was built in 1984.

== Construction and career ==
On 1 February 2014 it was reported that while under the command of Captain 3rd Rank Alexei Petrov (Алексей Петров), she conducted training in local waters near the Kamchatka Peninsula. Training events included protecting the vessel, chemical contamination of the water supply, using personal protective equipment, disinfection, and decontamination of the ship.

On 25 March 2013 it was reported that she participated in local training with her Nanuchka III-class sister ship Iney and the Grisha V-class MPK-82 in Avacha Bay. Her crew trained on survival in severe weather conditions and responding to emergencies. Future training was to consist of anti-aircraft and anti-submarine warfare. One of the corvettes was pictured launching an SA-N-4 missile and shooting its AK-176 gun.

Following an extensive refit from 2017 to 2019, Smerch was re-entered service with a new AK-176MA 76 mm gun and four quad Uran/SS-N-25 'Switchblade' replacing the old triple SS-N-9 launchers. Smerch remained active as of 2024, participating in joint exercises with the Chinese Navy in October of that year. She was again reported active on exercises in early 2026.

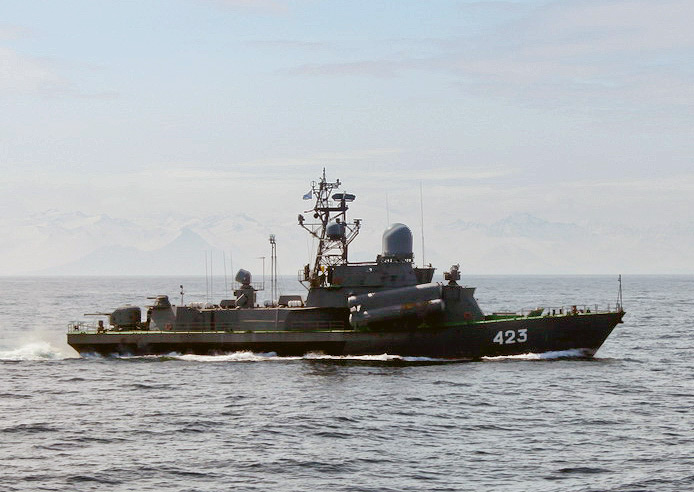
Smerch before modernisation, c. 2014
