= Russian corvette Passat =

Nanuchka-class corvette of the Soviet Navy

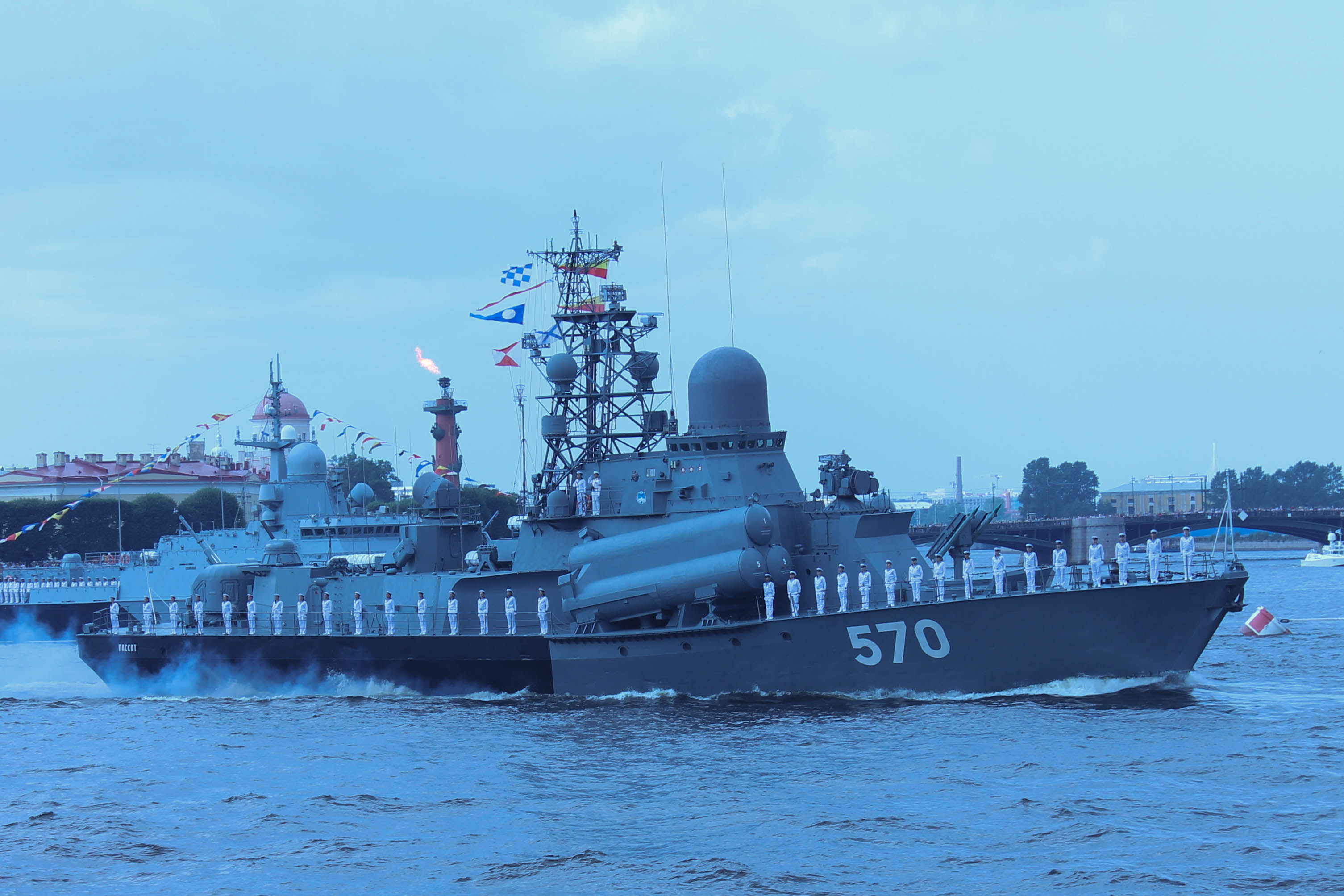
- Passat

History

→ Soviet Union → Russia
- Name: Passat; (Пассат)
- Namesake: Passat
- Builder: Almaz Shipyard, Leningrad
- Yard number: 82
- Laid down: 27 May 1988
- Launched: 13 June 1990
- Commissioned: 6 December 1990
- Identification: See Pennant numbers
- Status: Active

General characteristics
- Class & type: Nanuchka III-class corvette
- Displacement: 560 long tons (569 t) standard; 660 long tons (671 t) full load
- Length: 59.3 m (194 ft 7 in)
- Beam: 12.6 m (41 ft 4 in)
- Draft: 2.7 m (8 ft 10 in)
- Propulsion: Diesel engines, 30,000 hp (22,371 kW); 3 shaft
- Speed: 32 knots (59 km/h)
- Range: 2,500 nautical miles (4,630 km) at 12 knots (22 km/h; 14 mph); 900 nmi (1,667 km) at 30 knots (56 km/h; 35 mph)
- Complement: 60
- Sensors & processing systems: Radar: Band Stand fire control; Bass Tilt; Peel Pair surface search; Pop group
- Armament: 2 × triple P-120 (SS-N-9 'Siren'); 16 × Kh-35 (SS-N-25 'Switchblade') anti-ship cruise missiles; 1 × 76mm AK-176 gun; 1 × 30mm AK-630 gun; 20 × 4K33 (SA-N-4 'Gecko') surface-to-air missiles

Passat is a Nanuchka-class corvette in the Soviet Navy and later the Russian Navy.

== Specifications ==
Small missile ships of the Project 1234 according to NATO classification Nanuchka-class corvette is a series of Soviet small missile ships (MRK) of the 3rd rank built at shipyards of the USSR from 1967 to 1992.

The type consists of three series of subprojects:

- Project 1234, NATO code Nanuchka I
- Project 1234E, NATO code Nanuchka II
- Project 1234.1, NATO code Nanuchka III
- Project 1234.7, NATO code Nanuchka IV

By the name of the project code, the ships received the nickname gadflies in the navy. IRAs of Project 1234 were supplied to the Navy of four countries of the world: the USSR, Algeria, Libya and India. Libyan ones were destroyed during the NATO military operation in the summer of 2011; Indian ships of this project were withdrawn from the Indian Navy in 1999-2004.

The ships of the project were actively operated in all four fleets of the Soviet Navy and during the 1970-1980s carried out combat services in the World Ocean. They left a noticeable mark on the history of Soviet shipbuilding and are currently being gradually withdrawn from the combat strength of the Russian fleet. So, if at the beginning of 2001 in the Russian Navy there were 2 ships of project 1234 and 18 ships of Project 1234.1, then by 2006 all ships of project 1234 were withdrawn from the Navy and only 12 ships of the project remained in Project 1234.1 and 1 ship of Project 1234.7.

== Construction and career ==
Passat was laid down on 27 May 1988 at Almaz Shipyard, Leningrad. Launched on 13 June 1990 and commissioned into the Baltic Fleet on 6 December 1990.

In 2006, Passat paid a port visit to Germany. In July 2007, Passat visited the port of Vlissingen, the Netherlands, taking part in the celebrations on the occasion of the 400th anniversary of the Dutch admiral Michael de Reiter. On 28 June 2008, the ship took part in the naval parade at Bruges, Belgium.

In 2013, Passat was under refit. In 2015, repairs were planned to extend the life of the ship.

On 6 September 2017, the ship took part in a live-firing exercise. On 28 July 2019, the ship took part in the Main Naval Parade to mark the Day of the Russian Navy. On 26 July 2020, the ship took part in the Main Naval Parade to mark the Day of the Russian Navy.

=== Pennant numbers ===
Date	Pennant number
1990	465
1990	570
