= Russian corvette Aysberg =

Nanuchka-class corvette of the Soviet Navy

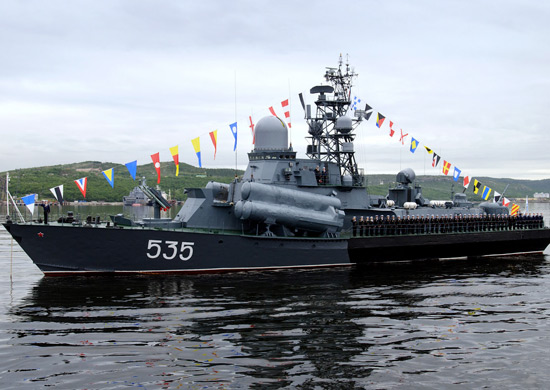
- Aysberg

History

→ Soviet Union → Russia
- Name: Aysberg; (Айсберг)
- Namesake: Aysberg
- Builder: Almaz Shipyard, Leningrad
- Yard number: 71
- Laid down: 11 November 1976
- Launched: 20 April 1979
- Commissioned: 30 September 1979
- Identification: See Pennant numbers
- Status: Decommissioned

General characteristics
- Class & type: Nanuchka III-class corvette
- Displacement: 560 long tons (569 t) standard; 660 long tons (671 t) full load
- Length: 59.3 m (194 ft 7 in)
- Beam: 12.6 m (41 ft 4 in)
- Draft: 2.7 m (8 ft 10 in)
- Propulsion: Diesel engines, 30,000 hp (22,371 kW); 3 shaft
- Speed: 32 knots (59 km/h)
- Range: 2,500 nautical miles (4,630 km) at 12 knots (22 km/h; 14 mph); 900 nmi (1,667 km) at 30 knots (56 km/h; 35 mph)
- Complement: 60
- Sensors & processing systems: Radar: Band Stand fire control; Bass Tilt; Peel Pair surface search; Pop group
- Armament: 2 × triple P-120 (SS-N-9 'Siren'); 16 × Kh-35 (SS-N-25 'Switchblade') anti-ship cruise missiles; 1 × 76mm AK-176 gun; 1 × 30mm AK-630 gun; 20 × 4K33 (SA-N-4 'Gecko') surface-to-air missiles

Aysberg was a Nanuchka-class corvette in the Soviet Navy and later the Russian Navy.

== Specifications ==
Small missile ships of the Project 1234 (NATO classification Nanuchka-class) corvette is a series of Soviet small missile ships (MRK) of the 3rd rank built at shipyards in the USSR from 1967 to 1992.

The type consists of three series of subprojects:

- Project 1234, NATO code Nanuchka I
- Project 1234E, NATO code Nanuchka II
- Project 1234.1, NATO code Nanuchka III
- Project 1234.7, NATO code Nanuchka IV

By the name of the project code, the ships received the nickname Gadflies in the Navy. IRAs from Project 1234 were supplied to the Navy of four countries in the world: the USSR, Algeria, Libya, and India. Libyan ones were destroyed during the NATO military operation in the summer of 2011; Indian ships for this project were withdrawn from the Indian Navy in 1999–2004.

The ships of the project were actively operated in all four fleets of the Soviet Navy and, during the 1970-1980s, carried out combat services in the World Ocean. They left a noticeable mark on the history of Soviet shipbuilding and are currently being gradually withdrawn from the combat strength of the Russian fleet. So, if at the beginning of 2001 in the Russian Navy there were 2 ships of project 1234 and 18 ships of Project 1234.1, then by 2006 all ships of Project 1234 were withdrawn from the Navy and only 12 ships of the project remained in Project 1234.1 and 1 ship of Project 1234.7.

== Construction and career ==
Aysberg was laid down on 11 November 1976 at Almaz Shipyard, Leningrad. Launched on 20 April 1979 and commissioned into the Northern Fleet on 30 September 1979.

From 20 September 1989 to 14 November 1990, the Shipyard No. 82 at Roslyakovo underwent an average repair.

From 1994 to 2011, after the disbandment of 55 brk (m), it was part of the 108th Pechenga Red Banner Order of Ushakov, 1st degree, of the small missile ship division of the Kola Flotilla of heterogeneous forces of the Northern Fleet based in the Yekaterininskaya harbor (Polyarny).

From 9 January 1998 to December 2011, in the composition of 7 brnk (military unit 90829).

Since 2000, in the composition of 7 brkovr (military unit 90829).

Having celebrated its 40th anniversary in 2019, along with the Rassvet MRK of a later construction, it remained part of the constant readiness forces. The ship was reported to have decommissioned from service with the Northern Fleet in 2022.

=== Pennant numbers ===
Date	Pennant number
	523
	511
1988	535
