= Bogomol-class patrol boat =

Class overview
- Name: Bogomol class (Project 02065)
- Operators: Soviet Navy; Russian Navy; Guinea Navy; Guinea-Bissau Navy; Iraqi Navy
- Built: 1988 - 1990
- In service: 1988 - 2020
- In commission: 1988 - 2020
- Planned: 9
- Completed: 9
- Retired: 9

General characteristics
- Type: Coast guard patrol ship
- Displacement: 225 tons standard; 266 tons full load
- Length: 41 m (134 ft 6 in)
- Beam: 7.6 m (24 ft 11 in)
- Draught: 2.01 m (6 ft 7 in)
- Propulsion: 3 x 4800 hp M520TM-5 diesels, 1 x 200 kW DGR-200 diesel generator, 1x100 kW DGR-100 diesel generator
- Speed: 36 knots (67 km/h; 41 mph)
- Range: 400 nautical miles (740 km; 460 mi) at 36 knots (67 km/h; 41 mph); 1,700 nautical miles (3,100 km; 2,000 mi) at 12 knots (22 km/h; 14 mph)
- Endurance: 8 days
- Complement: 32
- Sensors & processing systems: Rangout radar, Nakat, Liman navigation radar, Nikhrom-R IFF, SPO-3 EW complex
- Armament: 1 x 76 mm AK-176; 1 x 30 mm AK-630; 12 depth charges

The Bogomol class (Project 02065 Vikhr-III) is the NATO reporting name for a group of small coast guard patrol ship built for the Soviet Navy and some export customer's navies, all were built in the Vladivostok Shipyard.

== Design and service ==
Only 9 units were built, 6 units were exported to the navies of Guinea, Guinea-Bissau and Iraq.

== Ships ==
A total of 9 boats were built for the Soviet Navy and export customers.

- Guinea Navy - 2 units transferred by the USSR in 1990, derelict by the 2000s.
