= Russian corvette Iney =

Nanuchka-class corvette of the Soviet Navy

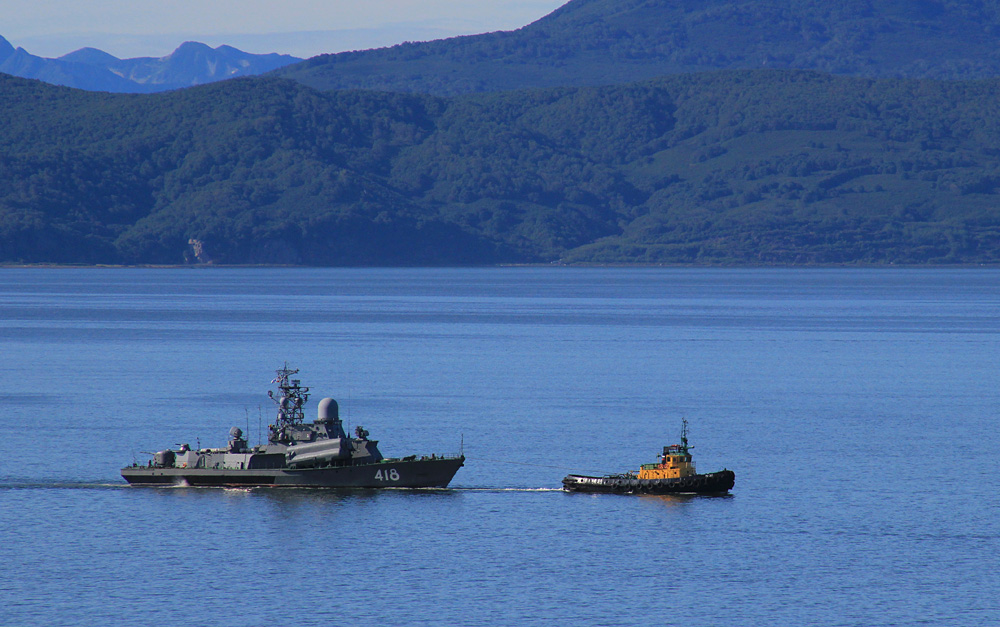
- Iney in 2010

History

Russia
- Name: Livien'; (Ливень)
- Namesake: Livien'
- Builder: Vostochnaya Verf, Vladivostok
- Yard number: 1005
- Laid down: 6 July 1983
- Launched: 5 October 1986
- Commissioned: 25 December 1987
- Renamed: Iney; (Иней)
- Namesake: Iney
- Identification: See Pennant numbers
- Status: Status unclear; still active as of early 2022

General characteristics
- Class & type: Nanuchka III-class corvette
- Displacement: 560 long tons (569 t) standard; 660 long tons (671 t) full load
- Length: 59.3 m (194 ft 7 in)
- Beam: 12.6 m (41 ft 4 in)
- Draft: 2.7 m (8 ft 10 in)
- Propulsion: Diesel engines, 30,000 hp (22,371 kW); 3 shaft
- Speed: 32 knots (59 km/h)
- Range: 2,500 nautical miles (4,630 km) at 12 knots (22 km/h; 14 mph); 900 nmi (1,667 km) at 30 knots (56 km/h; 35 mph)
- Complement: 60
- Sensors & processing systems: Radar: Band Stand fire control; Bass Tilt; Peel Pair surface search; Pop group
- Armament: 2 × triple P-120 (SS-N-9 'Siren'); 16 × Kh-35 (SS-N-25 'Switchblade') anti-ship cruise missiles; 1 × 76mm AK-176 gun; 1 × 30mm AK-630 gun; 20 × 4K33 (SA-N-4 'Gecko') surface-to-air missiles

Iney is a Nanuchka-class corvette in the Soviet Navy and later the Russian Navy.

== Specifications ==
Small missile ships of the Project 1234 according to NATO classification Nanuchka-class corvette is a series of Soviet small missile ships (MRK) of the 3rd rank built at shipyards of the USSR from 1967 to 1992.

The type consists of three series of subprojects:

- Project 1234, NATO code Nanuchka I
- Project 1234E, NATO code Nanuchka II
- Project 1234.1, NATO code Nanuchka III
- Project 1234.7, NATO code Nanuchka IV

By the name of the project code, the ships received the nickname gadflies in the navy. IRAs of Project 1234 were supplied to the Navy of four countries of the world: the USSR, Algeria, Libya and India. Libyan ones were destroyed during the NATO military operation in the summer of 2011; Indian ships of this project were withdrawn from the Indian Navy in 1999–2004.

The ships of the project were actively operated in all four fleets of the Soviet Navy and during the 1970-1980s carried out combat services in the World Ocean. They left a noticeable mark on the history of Soviet shipbuilding and are currently being gradually withdrawn from the combat strength of the Russian fleet. So, if at the beginning of 2001 in the Russian Navy there were 2 ships of project 1234 and 18 ships of Project 1234.1, then by 2006 all ships of project 1234 were withdrawn from the Navy and only 12 ships of the project remained in Project 1234.1 and 1 ship of Project 1234.7.

== Construction and career ==
Iney was laid down on 6 July 1983 at Vostochnaya Verf, Vladivostok. Launched on 5 October 1986 and commissioned into the Pacific Fleet on 25 December 1987. On 14 April 1987, she was renamed from his originally planned name of Livien' to Iney.

The status of the vessel was unclear as of early 2022. She was reported as scheduled to decommission in 2021, but was still active off Japan as of early 2022.

=== Pennant numbers ===
Date	Pennant number
1987	422
1990	415
2000	418
