= Nanuchka-class corvette =

Type of Soviet naval vessel (1969–1991)

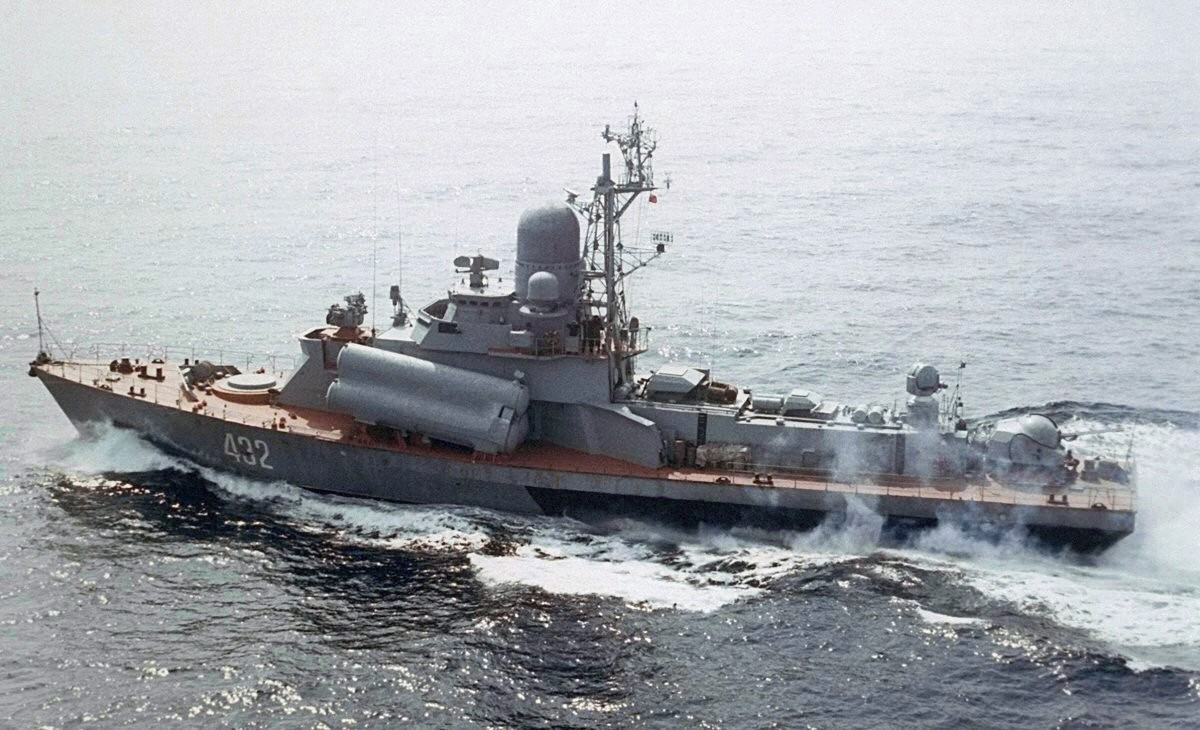
- Nanuchka I class corvette Vikhr in 1988

Class overview
- Operators: Soviet Navy (former); Russian Navy; Algerian National Navy; Indian Navy (former); Libyan Navy (former)
- Succeeded by: Buyan class
- Subclasses: Durg-class corvette
- Completed: 47
- Canceled: 1
- Active: 8-10
- Lost: 5
- Retired: 30+

General characteristics
- Type: Guided missile corvette
- Displacement: 560 long tons (569 t) standard, 660 long tons (671 t) full load
- Length: 59.3 m (194.6 ft)
- Beam: 12.6 m (41.3 ft)
- Draught: 2.7 m
- Propulsion: 3 shaft Diesels, 30,000 hp (22,371 kW)
- Speed: 32 knots (59 km/h)
- Range: 2,500 nautical miles (4,630 km) at 12 kn (22 km/h); 900 nmi (1,667 km) at 30 kn (56 km/h)
- Complement: 60
- Sensors & processing systems: Radar: Band Stand fire control; Bass Tilt; Peel Pair surface search; Pop group
- Armament: 6 × P-120 (SS-N-9 'Siren') (2×3) or 4 × P-15 (SS-N-2 'Styx') (export ships) anti-ship missiles; 16 × Kh-35 (SS-N-25 'Switchblade') anti-ship cruise missiles (Nanuchka III); 20 × 4K33 (SA-N-4 'Gecko') surface-to-air missiles; Twin 57mm AK-257 gun (Nanuchka I); 1 × 76mm AK-176 gun (Nanuchka III); 1 × 30mm AK-630 gun (Nanuchka III)

The Nanuchka class, Soviet designation Project 1234 Ovod, are series of corvettes (small missile ships in Soviet classification) built for the Soviet Navy and export customers between 1969 and 1991.

== Variants ==
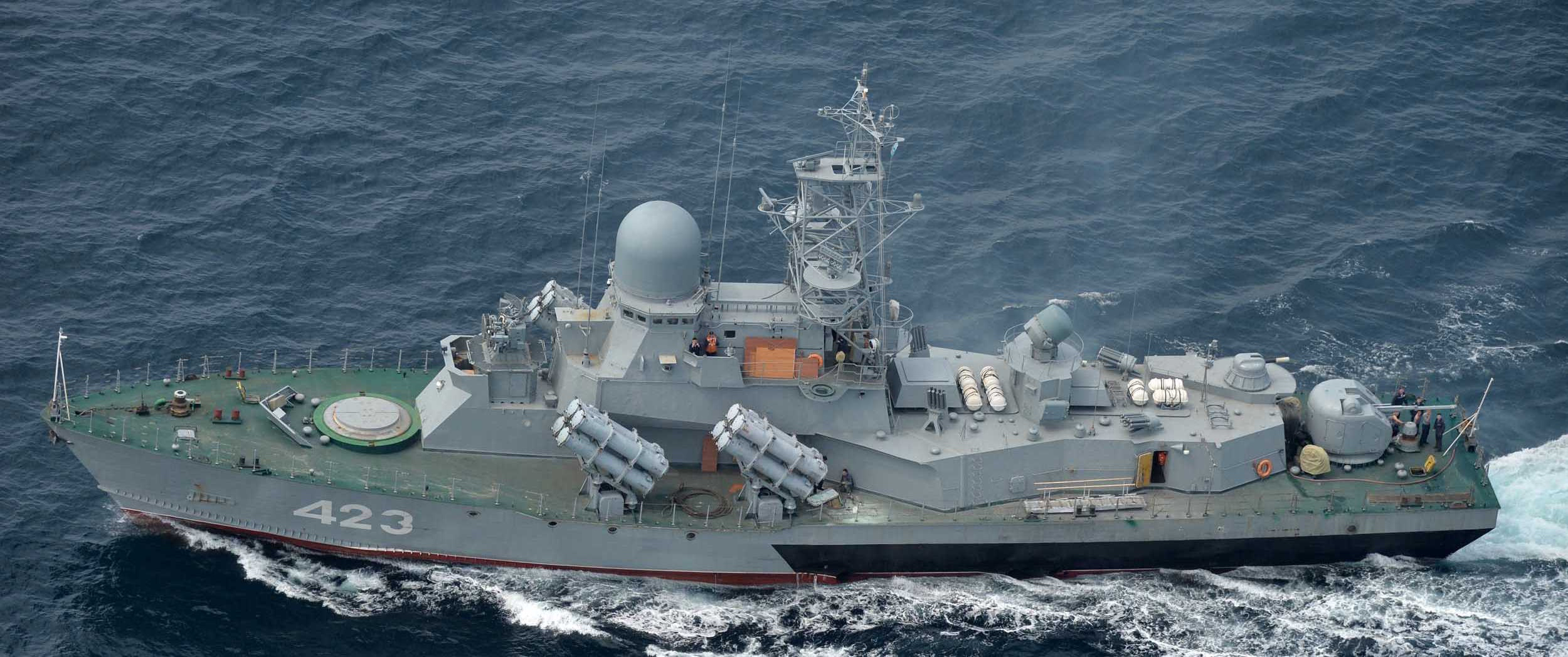
Nanuchka III class corvette Smerch after refit in 2019

These ships were designed around the P-120 Malakhit ("Siren") anti ship missile. Export versions used the P-15 Termit ("Styx") missile. In 2019 the missiles on Smerch were replaced with sixteen Uran/SS-N-25 'Switchblade'. Unlike smaller missile boats, both carry SA-N-4 ("Gecko") SAMs for self-defence. The original Nanuchka I carried a twin 57mm AK-257 main gun, replaced by a 76mm AK-176 in the Nanuchka III and an updated AK-176MA was added to Smerch during the refit. The Nanuchka III also has a rotary 30mm AK-630 point-defence gun to bolster its protection against missile attack. Currently Project 12341 ships are receiving BAGIRA Fire Control System turning them into multirole vessels.

== Operational history ==
Reportedly the Mirazh, a Nanuchka III corvette, sank a Georgian vessel during an attempted attack on Russian ships off Abkhazia on 10 August 2008.

== Operators ==
Russian Navy

- Nanuchka I (Project 1234) - 17 boats - retired in the 1990s, except Musson which was sunk in error by an SSM during an exercise in 1987 (39 fatalities).
- Nanuchka III (Project 12341) - 16 boats - 5-7 in service with the Russian Navy as of 2025 (3 Baltic, 1-3 Pacific, 1 Northern).
- Nanuchka IV (Project 12347) - 1 boat Nakat - retired in 2012. Trial vessel for P-800 Oniks ASHM.

Algerian National Navy

- Nanuchka II (Project 1234E) - 3 ships delivered in 1980-81, still in service.

Indian Navy

- Nanuchka II (Project 1234E) - 3 ships known as the Durg class, last ship decommissioned in 2004.

Libyan Navy

- Nanuchka II (Project 1234E) - 4 ships delivered in 1982-85. Al Zaquit was sunk and Ain Al Gazala was damaged (later scrapped) by US forces on March 25, 1986. Ain Zaara was in repairs in Misrata and was destroyed in a NATO airstrike on May 19, 2011. The last ship, Tariq Ibn Ziyad was destroyed during a fight between Libyan government army and radical Islamist forces in Benghazi harbour November 3, 2014.

(Libya) Libyan People's Army

- Nanuchka II (Project 1234E) - 1 ship Tariq Ibn Ziyad was captured in 2011 from the Libyan Navy. The ship was returned to Libyan Navy after the civil war. Subsequently destroyed in 2014.

== Ships ==
=== Project 1234 (Nanuchka I) ===
Name	Builder	Laid down	Launched	Commissioned	Status	Notes
Burya	Almaz Shipyard, St. Petersburg	13 January 1967	18 October 1968	30 September 1970	Decommissioned in 1991	
Briz	Almaz Shipyard, St. Petersburg	5 November 1967	10 October 1969	31 December 1970	Decommissioned in 1992	
Vikhr	Almaz Shipyard, St. Petersburg	21 August 1967	22 July 1970	30 September 1971	Decommissioned in 1994	
Volna	Almaz Shipyard, St. Petersburg	27 September 1968	20 July 1971	31 December 1971	Decommissioned in 1993	
Grad	Almaz Shipyard, St. Petersburg	29 November 1967	30 April 1972	30 September 1972	Decommissioned in 1993	
Groza	Almaz Shipyard, St. Petersburg	9 January 1969	26 July 1972	26 December 1972	Decommissioned in 1991	
Grom	Almaz Shipyard, St. Petersburg	1 October 1969	29 October 1972	28 December 1972	Decommissioned in 1995	
Zarnica	Almaz Shipyard, St. Petersburg	27 July 1970	28 April 1973	18 September 1973	Decommissioned in 2005	
Molniya	Almaz Shipyard, St. Petersburg	30 September 1971	27 August 1973	28 December 1973	Decommissioned in 2001	
Shkval	Almaz Shipyard, St. Petersburg	17 May 1972	28 December 1973	16 Juny 1974	Decommissioned in 1994	
Zaria	Almaz Shipyard, St. Petersburg	18 October 1972	18 May 1974	28 September 1974	Decommissioned in 1994	
Myetyel	Almaz Shipyard, St. Petersburg	19 February 1973	10 August 1974	8 December 1974	Decommissioned in 1998	
Shtorm	Almaz Shipyard, St. Petersburg	28 October 1973	30 March 1975	15 June 1975	Decommissioned in 1998	
Raduga	Almaz Shipyard, St. Petersburg	6 January 1974	20 June 1975	1 December 1975	Decommissioned in 1994	
Tsiklon	Vostochnaya Verf, Vladivostok	22 September 1973	24 May 1977	31 December 1977	Decommissioned in 1995	
Tayfun	Vostochnaya Verf, Vladivostok	10 May 1974	14 August 1979	30 December 1979	Decommissioned in 1995	
Musson	Vostochnaya Verf, Vladivostok	14 July 1975	1 July 1981	30 December 1981	Sunk on 16 April 1987	

=== Project 1234E (Nanuchka II) ===
Name	Builder	Laid down	Launched	Commissioned	Status	Notes
INS Vijaydurg (ex-Uragan)	Almaz Shipyard, St. Petersburg	31 May 1974	16 April 1976	30 September 1976	Scrapped in 2002	Transferred to Indian Navy in 1977.
INS Sindhudurg (ex-Priboy)	Almaz Shipyard, St. Petersburg	22 January 1975	2 October 1976	18 February 1977	Scrapped in 2004	Transferred to Indian Navy in 1977.
INS Hosdurg (ex-Priliv)	Almaz Shipyard, St. Petersburg	23 June 1975	14 April 1977	20 September 1977	Scrapped in 1999	Transferred to Indian Navy in 1978.
Ras Hamidou (ex-MRK-21)	Vympel Shipyard	10 March 1978	31 December 1979	4 July 1980	Active	Transferred to Algerian Navy in 1980.
Salah Reis (ex-MRK-23)	Vympel Shipyard	17 August 1978	31 July 1980	9 February 1981	Active	Transferred to Algerian Navy in 1981.
Reis Ali (ex-MRK-22)	Vympel Shipyard	4 April 1980	13 August 1981	30 November 1981	Active	Transferred to Algerian Navy in 1981.
Tariq Ibn Ziyad (ex-MRK-9)	Vympel Shipyard	21 April 1979	10 January 1981	26 May 1981	Active	Transferred to Libyan Navy in 1982.
Ain Al Gazala (ex-MRK-24)	Vympel Shipyard	20 February 1981	26 March 1982	31 May 1982	Damaged 25 March 1986, decommissioned	Transferred to Libyan Navy in 1983.
Ain Zaara (ex-MRK-25)	Vympel Shipyard	27 May 1981	21 July 1982	31 May 1983	Destroyed 20 May 2011	Transferred to Libyan Navy in 1984.
Ain Zaquit (ex-MRK-15)	Vympel Shipyard	25 March 1983	31 March 1984	10 September 1984	Sunk on 25 March 1986	Transferred to Libyan Navy in 1985.

=== Project 12341 (Nanuchka III) ===
Name	Builder	Laid down	Launched	Commissioned	Status	Notes
Burun	Almaz Shipyard, St. Petersburg	1975	1977	30 December 1977	Decommissioned in 2002	
Vyetyer	Almaz Shipyard, St. Petersburg	27 February 1976	21 April 1978	30 September 1978	Decommissioned in 1995	
Shtil' (ex-Komsomolets Mordovii), (ex-Zyb')	Almaz Shipyard, St. Petersburg	28 June 1976	23 October 1978	31 December 1978	Decommissioned in 2020	
Aysberg	Almaz Shipyard, St. Petersburg	11 November 1976	20 April 1979	30 September 1979	Decommissioned in 2022	
Tucha	Almaz Shipyard, St. Petersburg	4 May 1977	29 April 1980	31 July 1980	Decommissioned in 2005	
Uragan	Almaz Shipyard, St. Petersburg	1 August 1980	27 May 1983	30 September 1983	Decommissioned in 2002	
Priboy	Almaz Shipyard, St. Petersburg	25 November 1978	20 April 1984	30 November 1984	Decommissioned in 2001	
Priliv	Almaz Shipyard, St. Petersburg	29 April 1982	26 April 1985	31 October 1985	Decommissioned in 2002	
Mirazh	Almaz Shipyard, St. Petersburg	30 August 1983	19 August 1986	30 December 1986	Decommissioned in 2020	
Meteor	Almaz Shipyard, St. Petersburg	13 November 1984	16 September 1987	31 December 1987	Decommissioned in 2005	
Rassvyet	Almaz Shipyard, St. Petersburg	20 September 1986	22 August 1988	28 December 1988	Active as of 2026	
Zyb’	Almaz Shipyard, St. Petersburg	26 August 1986	28 February 1989	26 September 1989	Active	
Geyzer	Almaz Shipyard, St. Petersburg	21 December 1987	28 August 1989	27 December 1989	Active	
Passat	Almaz Shipyard, St. Petersburg	27 May 1988	13 June 1990	6 December 1990	Active	
Perekat	Almaz Shipyard, St. Petersburg	20 September 1988			Not completed	
Livien’	Almaz Shipyard, St. Petersburg	29 September 1988	8 May 1991	25 October 1991	Decommissioned 2025	
Smerch	Vostochnaya Verf, Vladivostok	16 November 1981	30 November 1984	30 December 1984	Active	
Iney (ex-Livien)	Vostochnaya Verf, Vladivostok	6 July 1983	5 October 1986	25 December 1987	Scheduled to decommission in 2021; status unclear; still reported active as of early 2022	
Moroz	Vostochnaya Verf, Vladivostok	17 February 1985	29 September 1989	30 December 1989	Decommissioned in 2021	
Razliv	Vostochnaya Verf, Vladivostok	1 November 1986	24 August 1991	31 December 1991	Scheduled to decommission in 2021; status unclear	

=== Project 12347 (Nanuchka IV) ===
Name	Builder	Laid down	Launched	Commissioned	Status	Notes
Nakat	Almaz Shipyard, St. Petersburg	4 November 1982	16 April 1987	30 September 1987	Decommissioned in 2012	

== See also ==
- List of ships of the Soviet Navy
- List of ships of Russia by project number

== Other sources ==
- Gardiner, Robert, ed. (1995). Conway's All the World's Fighting Ships 1947–1995. London: Conway Maritime. ISBN 0-85177-605-1. OCLC 34284130. Also published as Gardiner, Robert; Chumbley, Stephen; Budzbon, Przemysław (1995). Conway's All the World's Fighting Ships 1947–1995. Annapolis, MD: Naval Institute Press. ISBN 1-55750-132-7. OCLC 34267261.
- Berezhnoy, S.S.; Бережной, С.С. (2001). Malye protivolodochnye i malye raketnye korabli VMF SSSR i Rossii (Малые противолодочные и малые ракетные корабли ВМФ СССР и России). Morskaya Kollektsya no. 2/2001 (in Russian). Moscow: Zhurnal Modelist-konstruktor. ISBN 9780851776057. OCLC 48149340.
- "Project 1234 Nanuchka class Guided Missile Corvette". Federation of American Scientists. 7 September 2000.
- "Guided Missile Corvette Shtil'". Flot.sevastopol.info.
- "Guided Missile Corvette Mirazh". Flotsevastopol.info.

== Gallery ==
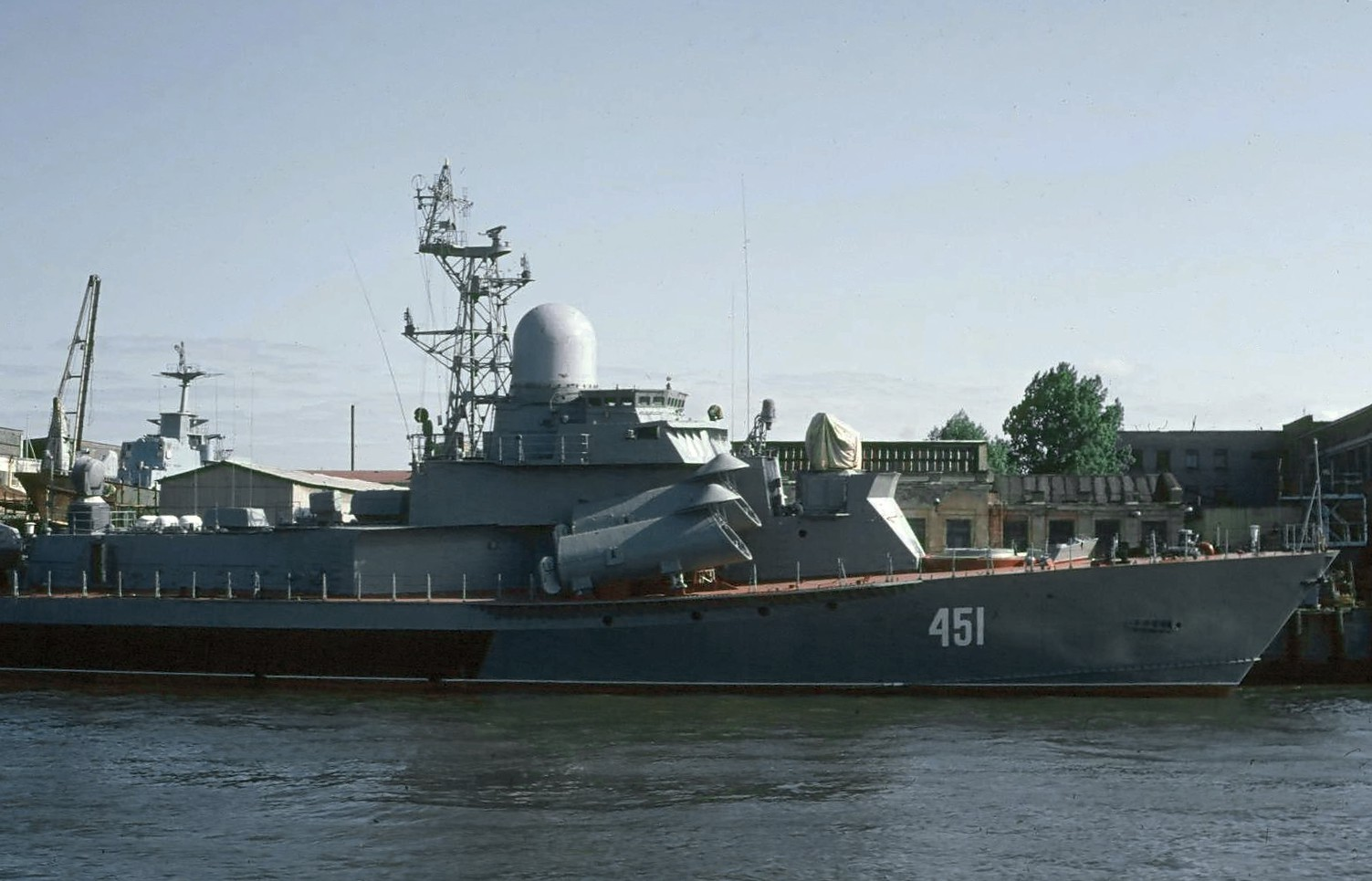
Export Nanuchka II-class corvette moored in Leningrad (i.e., Saint Petersburg). Photo was taken in July 1983

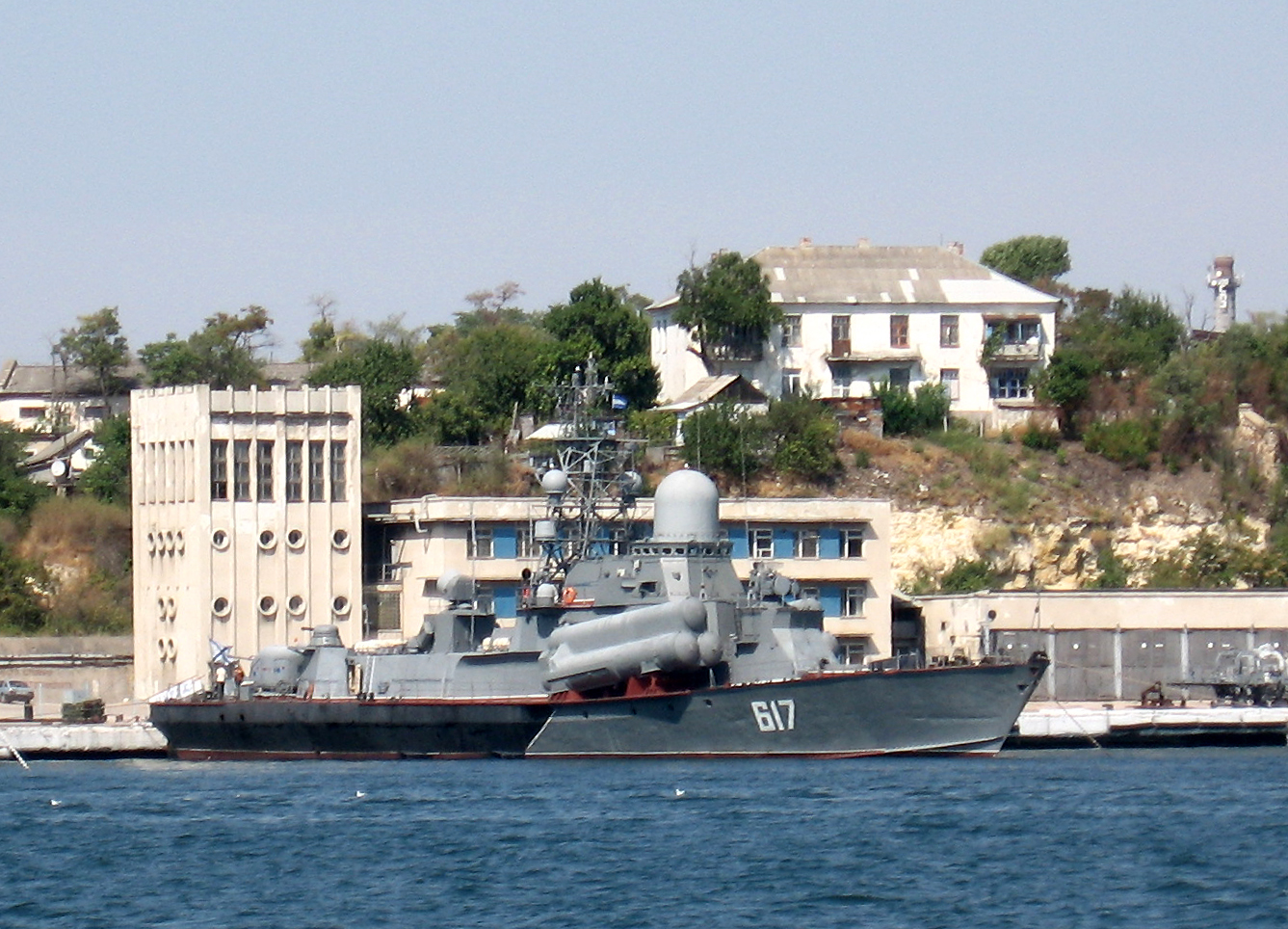

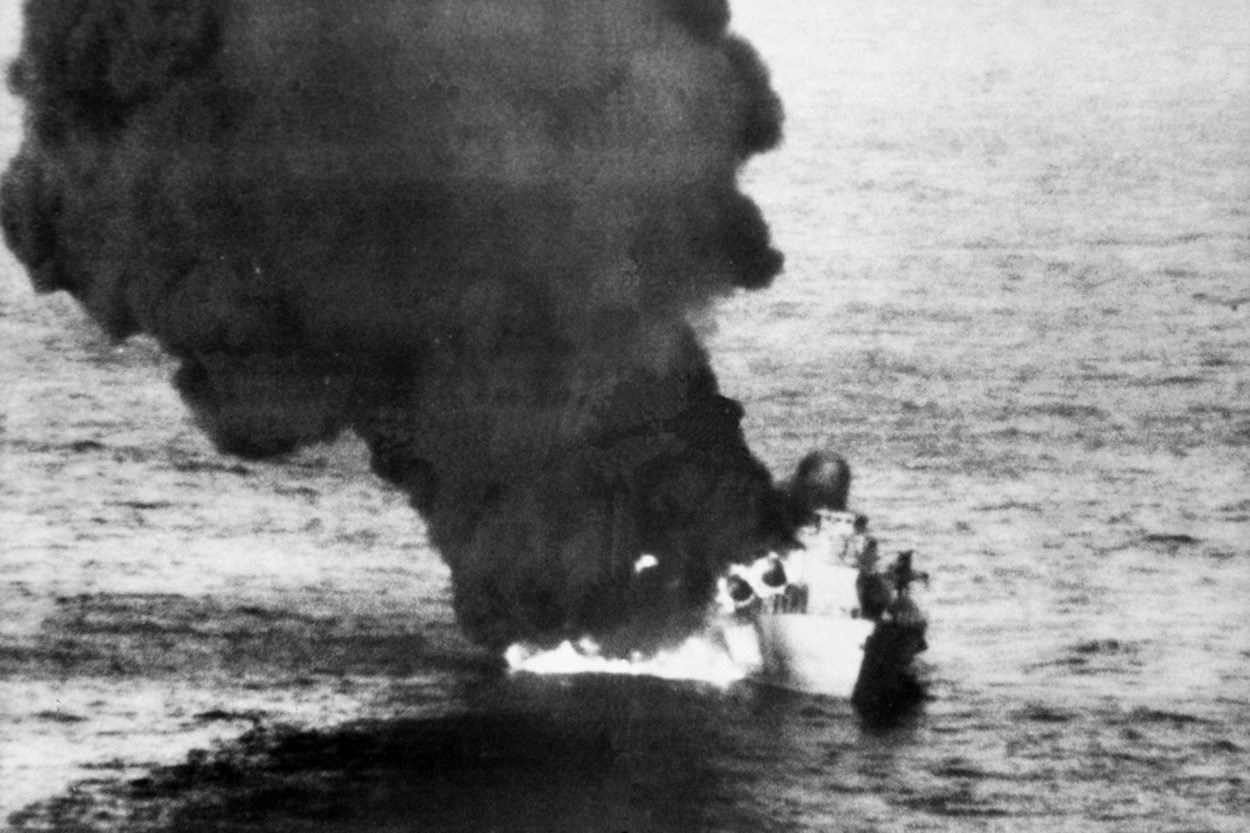
Libyan Nanuchka II burns after being hit 25 March 1986

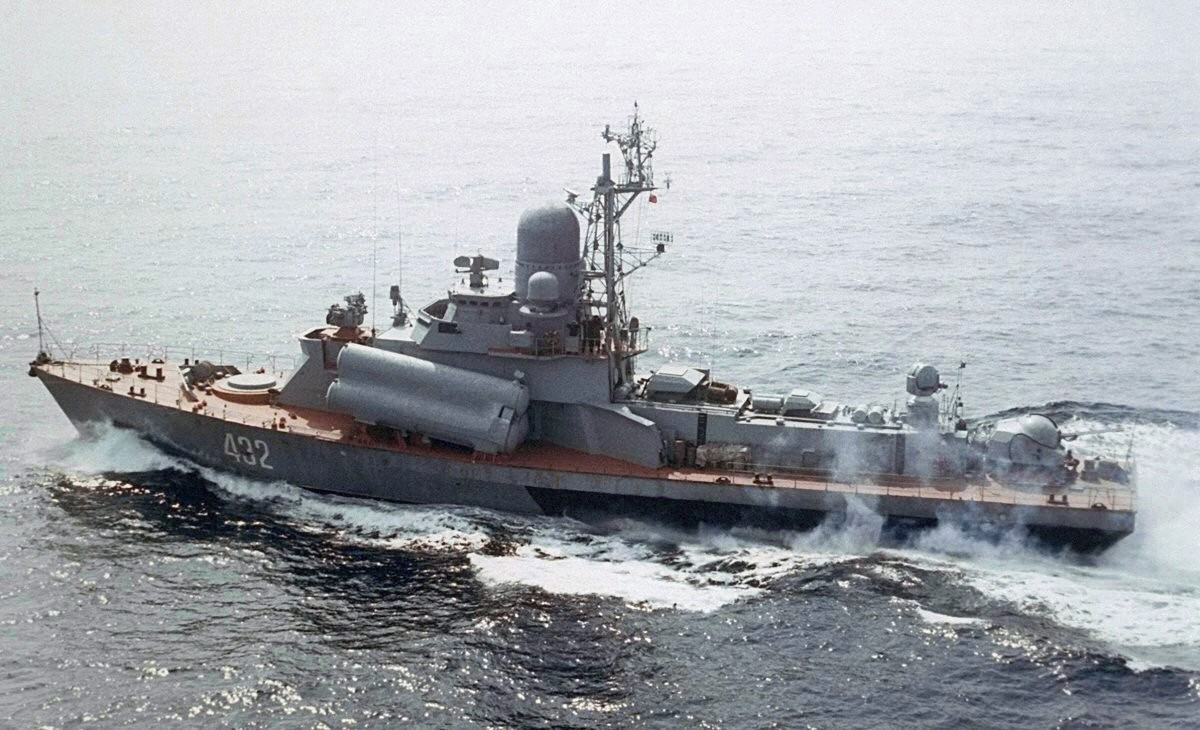
A port beam view of a Soviet Nanuchka I.
