= Kronstadt Marine Plant =

Coordinates: 59°58′54″N 29°47′07″E

- Industry: Shipbuilding
- Founded: 1858
- Headquarters: Kronstadt, Russia
- Revenue: $33.4 million (2017)
- Operating income: $5.65 million (2017)
- Net income: $3.42 million (2017)
- Total assets: $52.8 million (2017)
- Total equity: $27.7 million (2017)
- Parent: United Shipbuilding Corporation

The Kronstadt Marine Plant (Russian: Кронштадтский морской завод), originally established 16 March [O.S. 4 March] 1858 as 'Parokhodnyi mekhanicheskii z-d goroda Kronshtadta' (Russian: Пароходный завод), is a shipbuilding and repair center. It became the main repair center for the Baltic Fleet around 1900. By 1914 there were two dry docks, but no building slips. Operational 1917–1920; one of three military plants in the 1930s that produced munitions and torpedoes; arms parts and munitions during wartime.

Currently part of the United Shipbuilding Corporation.

== Bibliography ==
- Breyer, Siegfried (1992). Soviet Warship Development: Volume 1: 1917–1937. London: Conway Maritime Press. ISBN 0-85177-604-3.
