= Vostochnaya Verf =

Russian company

Coordinates: 43.084000°N 131.924000°E

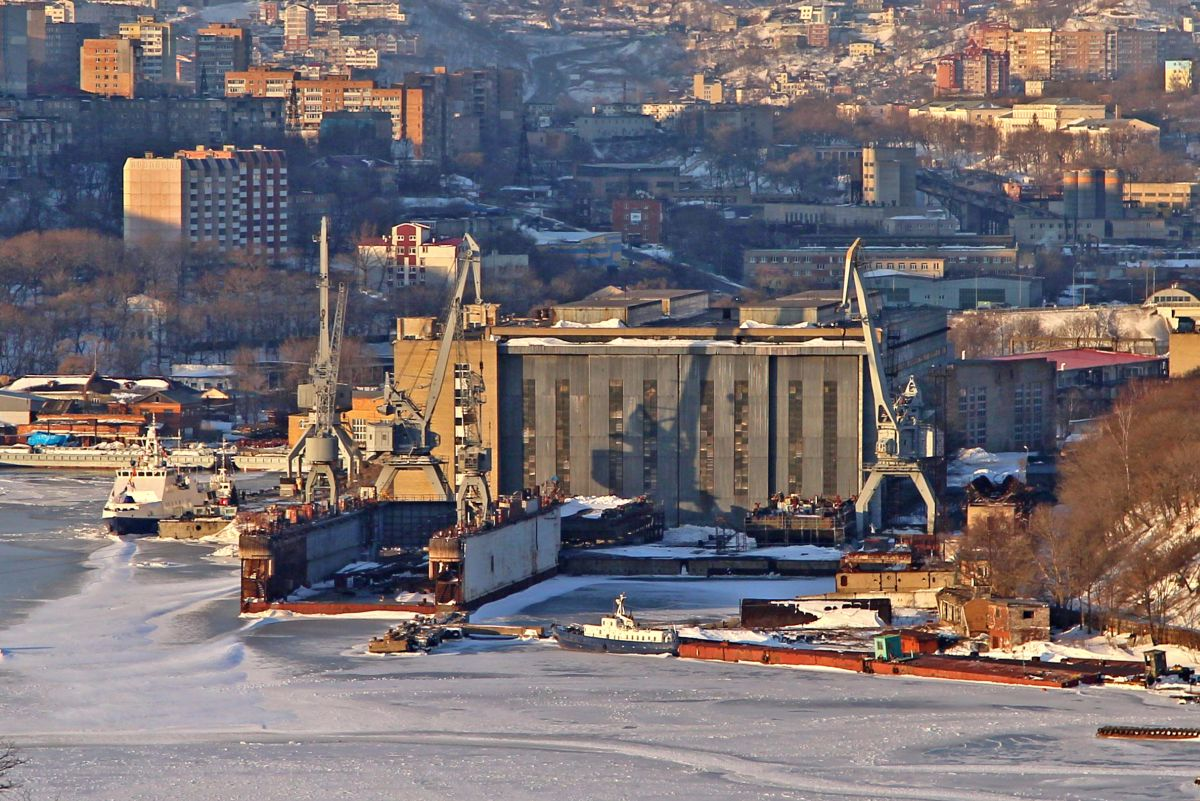
- Formerly: Vladivostok Shipyard
- Type: Joint-stock company
- Industry: Shipbuilding
- Founded: 1952; 74 years ago
- Headquarters: Vladivostok, Primorsky Krai, Russia
- Area served: International
- Key people: Sidenko Oleg Borisovich
- Products: Naval ships
- Number of employees: 1000
- Parent: United Shipbuilding Corporation
- Website: www.vverf.com

JSC Vostochnaya Verf (until 1994 - Vladivostok Shipyard) is a Russian shipbuilding enterprise in Vladivostok.

== Background ==
The enterprise was founded in 1952 for the construction of low-tonnage ships from non-magnetic materials for the needs of the Pacific Fleet and the border forces of the Far Eastern region of the USSR, such as minesweepers. In 1994, the plant was transformed into a joint stock company. From the 1950s to the 2000s, the enterprise built more than 400 ships for the Navy, border forces and fishing organizations. More than 30 units of military equipment were supplied for export to eight countries of the world (Vietnam, Cuba, China, Indonesia, Ethiopia, Guinea, Iraq, Yemen): torpedo and missile boats were built at this shipyard.

According to Igor Miroshnichenko, General Director of OJSC Vostochnaya Verf, by 2010, Vostochnaya Verf in terms of production volume reached 80-85% of the production level before restructuring.

PSKR Project 22460 patrol boats were ordered on 9 September 2014.

By the end of 2013, the full computerization of the enterprise was completed. The enterprise's capacities allow building ships and ships with a displacement of up to 2.5 thousand tons.

In 2015, Oleg Sidenko was appointed Acting Director General of Vostochnaya Verf.

Construction of the Project 03182 Mikhail Barskov small sea tanker was laid down on 27 October 2015, developed at Zelenodolsk Design Bureau as a multipurpose vessel of reinforced ice class for transporting liquid and dry cargo, performing rescue operations with the ability to receive helicopters, including unmanned aerial vehicles, continues. building No. 9001.

As of January 2016, at Vostochnaya Verf for the Federal Border Service of the FSB of Russia, PSKR Project 22460 Dozornyy was being built.

On 6 February 2018, a small sea tanker of Project 03182, serial number 9002, was laid down on the slipway.

On October 13, 2022, Vostochnaya Verf filed an application with the Primorsky Krai Arbitration Court with a request to declare it bankrupt. According to the results of 2021, the company received a large loss and cannot pay for its obligations.

== Naval ships ==
Naval ships built by Vostochnaya Verf include:

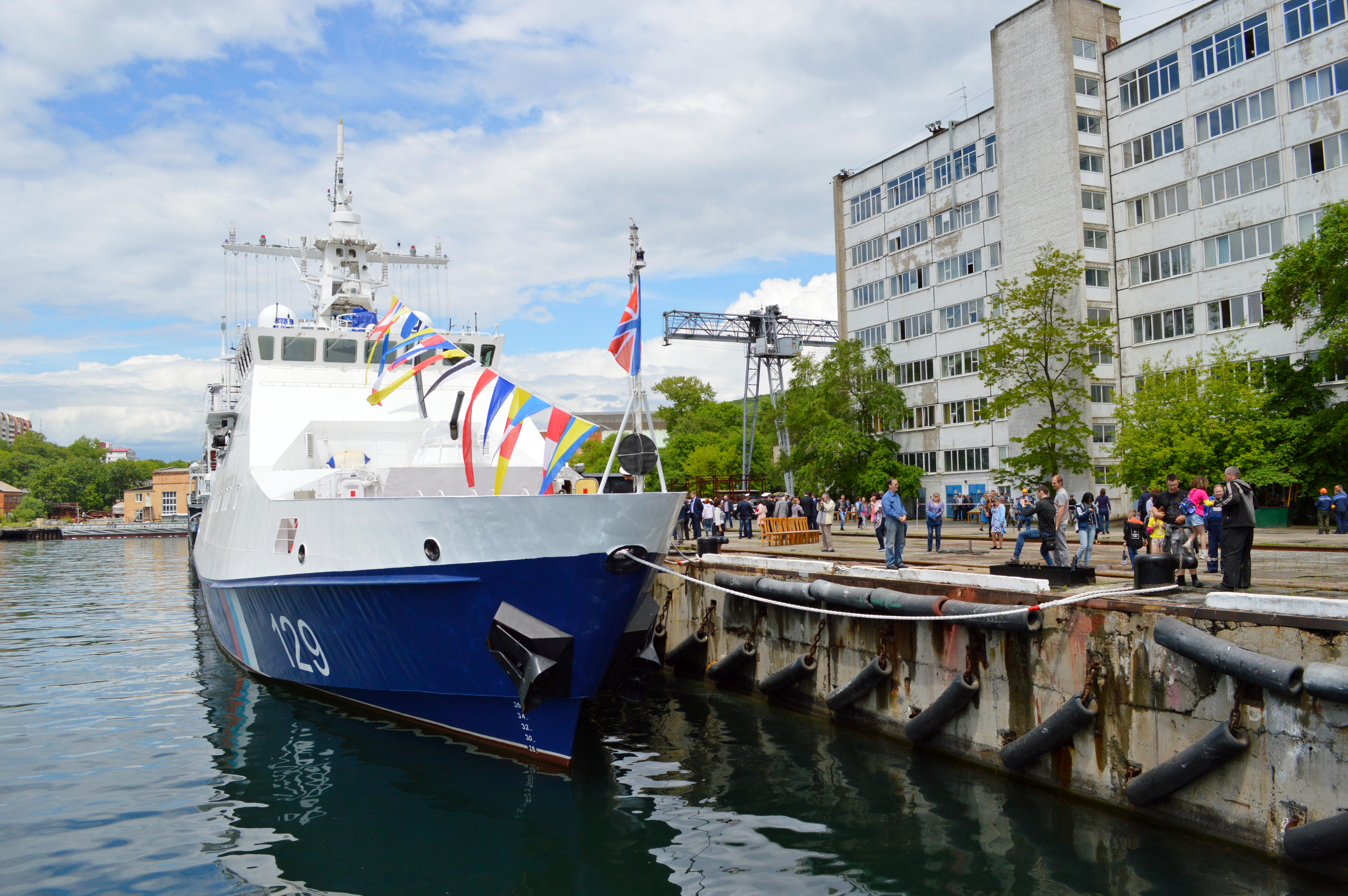
- Project 22460 Dozornyy on 21 June 2018
  Project 206-ME minehunters
- Project 10410 patrol boats
- Project 12200 patrol boats
- Project 22460 patrol boats
- Project 1496M patrol boats
- Project 11770 landing crafts
- Project 21820 landing crafts
- Project 205P missile boats
- Project 12341 corvettes
- Project 12412 corvettes
- Project 21980 anti-saboteur ships
- Project V19910 hydrographic survey vessels
- Project 03182 tankers
- Project CD342 catamaran vessels
