= Almaz Shipbuilding Company =

Shipbuilding company based in Saint Petersburg, Russia

- Industry: Shipbuilding
- Founded: 1933
- Headquarters: Saint Petersburg, Russia
- Website: www.almaz.spb.ru

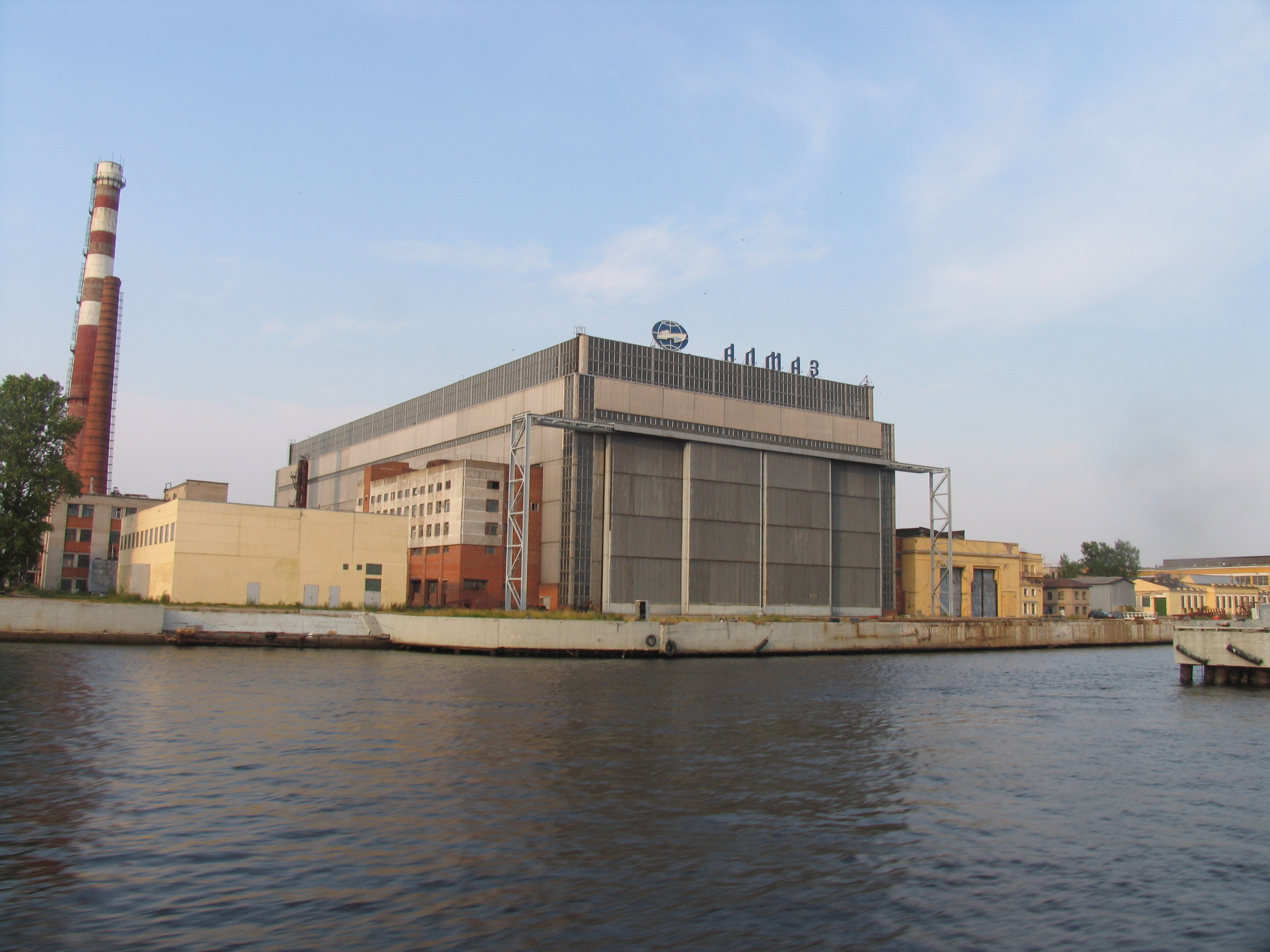
The Almaz plant

The Almaz Shipbuilding Company (Russian: Судостроительная фирма Алмаз) is a Russian manufacturing enterprise, specializing in military and commercial ship design, along with its development and production.

Headquartered in St. Petersburg, the factory has 165,000 square metres located in the central part of St. Petersburg on Petrovsky Island (near the Gulf of Finland). It was founded in 1901 for the production of motorboats. It has produced more than a thousand military and commercial ships.

== Production ==
- Hovercraft
- Patrol boats
- High-speed motor boats

== See also ==
- Lebed-class LCAC
- Aist-class LCAC
