= P-120 Malakhit =

Soviet subsonic antiship missile

P-120/P-50 Malakhit (NATO reporting name: SS-N-9 'Siren')
- P-120 Malakhit medium range cruise missile
- Type: Anti-ship missile
- Place of origin: Soviet Union

Service history
- In service: 1972–current
- Used by: Russia

Production history
- Designer: Zvezda
- Manufacturer: OKB-52 MAP (later NPO Mashinostroyeniye)

Specifications
- Mass: 3,180 kg (7,010 lb)
- Length: 8.84 m (29.0 ft)
- Diameter: 76.2 cm (30.0 in)
- Wingspan: 2.1 m (6.9 ft)
- Warhead: HE-SAP or 200 kt nuclear
- Warhead weight: total 840 kg (1,850 lb); HE 500 kg (1,100 lb)
- Propellant: Turbojet, solid fuel
- Operational range: Sub launched - conventional warhead: 70 km, nuclear warhead: 110 km; Ship launched - conventional warhead: 120 km, nuclear warhead: 150-160 km
- Maximum speed: Mach 1+
- Launch platform: Nanuchka and Sarancha, Charlie-II

The P-120 Malakhit (Russian: П-120 «Малахит» 'Malachite'; NATO reporting name: SS-N-9 Siren, GRAU designation: 4K85) is a Soviet medium range anti-ship missile used by corvettes and submarines. Introduced in 1972, it remains in service but has been superseded by the P-270 Moskit.

== Development ==
The Echo-class submarine was required to spend 30 minutes or more on the surface when firing its P-5 Pyatyorka (SS-N-3A 'Shaddock') missiles. This made the submarines very vulnerable to enemy attack, so in 1963 the Soviets started work on a new missile that could be fired whilst submerged, and a submarine to carry it. These became the P-50 Malakhit and Charlie-class submarine. The P-50 was replaced by the P-120 design during development.

However, problems in development meant that the twelve Charlie I submarines were built with the shorter-ranged P-70 Ametist (SS-N-7 'Starbright', an evolution of the SS-N-2C 'Styx') as a stopgap before the introduction of the P-120 Malakhit on the Charlie II.

The P-120 missile was later used as the basis for the SS-N-14 Silex rocket-propelled torpedo.

== Design ==
The L band seeker and radar altimeter originally designed for the 'Siren' were first used on the 'Starbright' whilst the Soviets sorted out the P-120's troublesome engines. However the 'Siren' has space for datalink equipment, allowing mid-course guidance from the launch platform or something else. When fired from a submarine, the missile can be launched at a maximum depth of 50 meters.

== Operational history ==
The 'Siren' entered service on corvettes of the Soviet Navy on March 17, 1972. It would be installed on Nanuchka-class corvettes. About 500 missiles were produced.

It was not until November 1977 that it was accepted for use on submarines. The Charlie-II submarine carried eight missiles (of which two usually carried thermonuclear warheads).

It saw action in 2008 in the hands of the Black Sea Fleet of the Russian Navy during the action off Abkhazia, where it was used without success, mistakenly against MV Lotos-1 from Moldova.

== Operators ==
Russia

- Russian Navy

Soviet Union
