= Project 23131 replenishment oiler =

Class overview
- Name: Project 23131
- Builders: Zaliv shipyard
- Operators: Russian Navy
- Built: 2014–present
- Building: 2

General characteristics
- Type: Replenishment oiler
- Tonnage: 12,000 DWT
- Length: 145 m (476 ft)
- Beam: 24 m (79 ft)
- Draught: 7 m (23 ft)
- Propulsion: 2 × diesels, 2 × fixed pitch propellers, 2 × bow thrusters
- Speed: 16 kn (30 km/h; 18 mph)
- Range: 8,000 nmi (15,000 km; 9,200 mi)
- Endurance: 60 days
- Complement: 24

Project 23131 is a series of replenishment oilers, developed by the Spetssudoproect JSC and being constructed by the Zaliv shipyard for the Russian Navy since December 2014. It is a heavier version and further development of Project 23130 replenishment oiler Academic Pashin.

== History ==
The first two Project 23131 ships, serial numbers "301" and "302", were laid down during a keel laying ceremony at the Zaliv shipyard, Kerch on 26 December 2014, planned to enter service in 2018. However, in February 2015, it was reported that construction of the two tankers had been halted, and that the sections that had been laid down in 2014 had been subsequently cut into scrap metal. In November 2018, Zaliv shipyard reported that the formation of the ships' hulls and superstructures was complete and that work was currently underway to prepare the two hulls for electrical installations.

== Ships ==
Name	Builder	Laid down	Launched	Commissioned	Status
	Zaliv Shipyard	26 December 2014			Under construction
	Zaliv Shipyard	26 December 2014			Under construction

== See also ==
- List of active Russian Navy ships
- Future of the Russian Navy
