= Uda-class oiler =

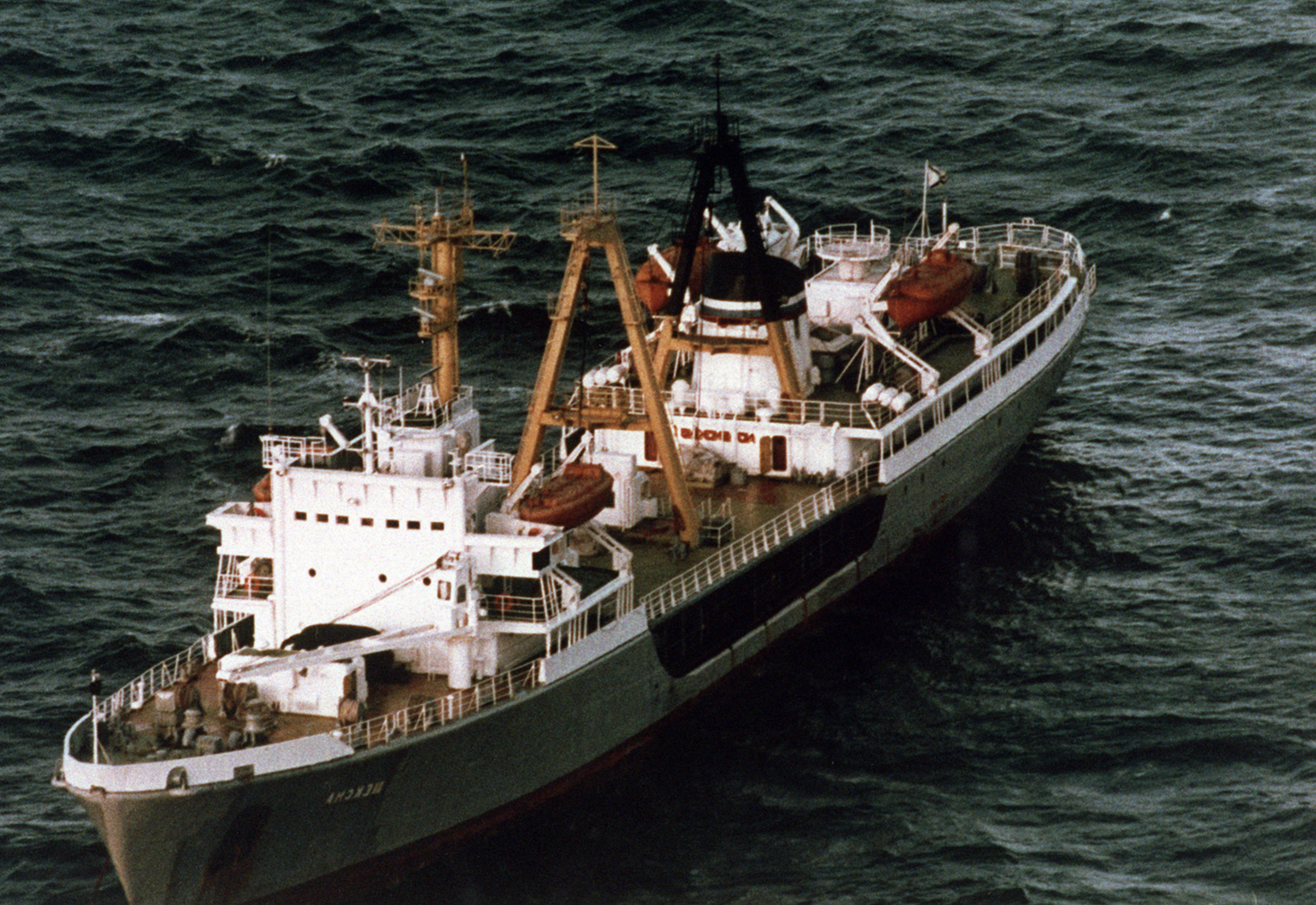
- Sheksna on 1 June 1993

Class overview
- Name: Project 577 (NATO: Uda Class)
- Builders: Vyborg Shipyard
- Operators: Soviet Navy; Russian Navy; Indonesian Navy
- Succeeded by: Olekma class
- Built: 1959–1967
- In commission: 1962–present
- Completed: 9
- Active: 5
- Retired: 4

General characteristics
- Type: Replenishment oiler
- Displacement: 2,910 tons (standard load); 7,240 tons (full load)
- Length: 121.9 m (400 ft)
- Beam: 16 m (52 ft)
- Draught: 6.51 m (21.4 ft)
- Propulsion: 2 × 4500 hp 58D diesels; 2 x 300 kW diesel-generators; 3 x 100 kW diesel-generators; 1 x 25 kW diesel-generator
- Speed: 17.7 kn (32.8 km/h; 20.4 mph)
- Range: 4,000 nmi (7,400 km; 4,600 mi)
- Endurance: 30 days
- Capacity: 3,600 tons
- Complement: 75
- Sensors & processing systems: MR-302 Rubka (air/surface search radar); Neptune (navigation radar); MR-103 Bars (fire control system)
- Armament: Project 577: 2 x 4 57 mm ZIF-75 anti-air guns; Project 577E: 3 x 2 25 mm 2M-3M anti-air guns

The Uda class, Soviet designation Project 577, is a class of replenishment oiler built for the Soviet Navy between 1962 and 1967.

== Construction ==
Project 577 vessels were built at the Vyborg, USSR shipyard during the 1960s and were designated VTR Voyenyy Tanker, Military Tanker) by the Soviet Navy. They are capable of replenishment at sea and an A-frame kingpost provides two amidships refueling positions. They are also capable of refueling over the stern.

The Project 577 is similar in design to a US Navy AO fleet tanker or a Royal Fleet Auxiliary fleet support tanker and performs the same operational role. Unlike US or British vessels of this type, the Project 577 does not have facilities for helicopters and is incapable of vertical replenishment.

There are provisions for fitting eight ZIF-75 57mm AA guns in quad mounts, plus one MR-302 Strut Curve and two MR-103 Bars radar, but no weapons systems have been reported fitted to the Uda class since the 1960s.

== Variants ==
- Project 577 – Soviet Navy
- Project 577E – Export version

== Ships ==
Name	Builder	Laid down	Launched	Commissioned	Fleet	Status
Project 577
Terek	Vyborg Shipyard	15 May 1959	19 December 1961	14 July 1962	Northern Fleet	Decommissioned in 2012
Sheksna	Vyborg Shipyard	28 December 1959	16 October 1962	31 December 1962	Baltic Fleet	Decommissioned in 1996
Dunay	Vyborg Shipyard	5 May 1964	14 October 1965	19 December 1965	Pacific Fleet	Decommissioned in 2021
Koyda	Vyborg Shipyard	15 December 1964	26 May 1966	28 July 1966	Black Sea Fleet	Active
Lena	Vyborg Shipyard	20 July 1965	22 October 1966	28 December 1966	Baltic Fleet	Active
Vishera	Vyborg Shipyard	21 March 1966	24 May 1967	30 June 1967	Pacific Fleet	Decommissioned in 2011
Project 577E (Indonesian Navy)
Balikpapan	Vyborg Shipyard	20 March 1962	16 August 1963	30 September 1963		Active
Pangkalan Brandan	Vyborg Shipyard	10 December 1962	23 May 1964	14 August 1964		Active
Vongkromo	Vyborg Shipyard	2 November 1963	18 July 1964	30 September 1964		Active

== See also ==
- List of ships of Russia by project number
- Altay-class oiler
- Khobi-class tanker
