= Project 23130 replenishment oiler =

Class of Russian replenishment oilers

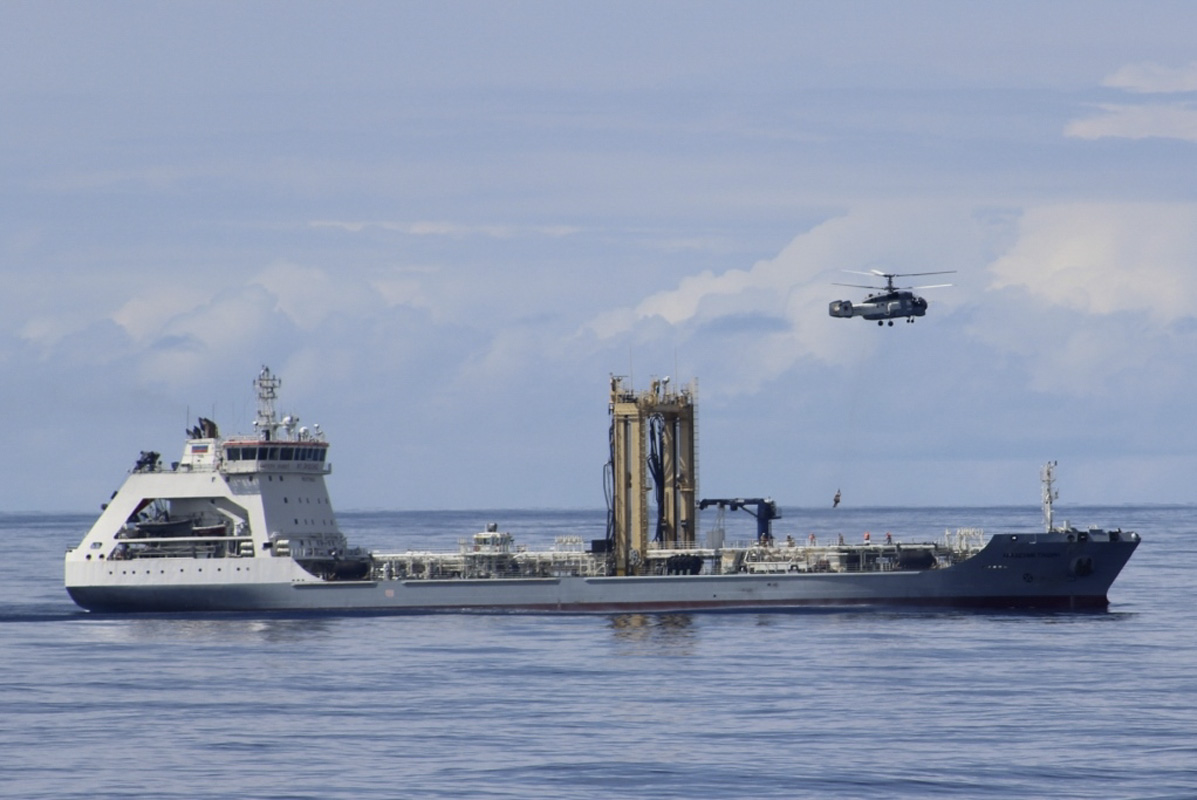
- Academic Pashin in 2021

Class overview
- Name: Project 23130
- Builders: Nevsky Shipyard, Schlisselburg
- Operators: Russian Navy
- Preceded by: Kaliningradneft class
- Subclasses: Project 23131
- Built: 2014–present
- In commission: 2020–present
- Planned: 6
- Building: 3
- Completed: 3
- Active: 1-2

General characteristics
- Type: Replenishment oiler
- Tonnage: 9,000 DWT
- Displacement: 5,000 tons (standard load); 14,000 tons (full load)
- Length: 130 m (430 ft)
- Beam: 21.5 m (71 ft)
- Draught: 7 m (23 ft)
- Propulsion: 2 × 6310 hp diesels, 1 × bow thruster
- Speed: 16 kn (30 km/h; 18 mph)
- Range: 8,000 nmi (15,000 km; 9,200 mi)
- Endurance: 60 days
- Capacity: 7,350 tons
- Complement: 24

Project 23130 is a series of medium-size replenishment oilers developed by the Spetssudoproect JSC and built by Nevsky Shipyard for the Russian Navy. Initially, it was to be limited only by one vessel, Akademik Pashin, however in January 2020, a decision was made to build five more vessels of the class. in parallel with Project 23130, larger Project 23131 oilers are being constructed by Zaliv shipyard in Crimea. It was indicated that the Russian Navy planned to create an "Arctic Group" to operate some of these ships within the Northern Fleet.

== Design ==
Project 23130 tankers are a medium-sized sea tankers with a strengthened steel double-hull of the Arc 4 class, for operations in the Arctic conditions. They can operate in temperatures from +45 ºС in summer to -30 ºС in winter. The ships are approximately 130 m (430 ft) long, 22 m (72 ft) wide and has a maximum draught of 7 m (23 ft). The service life of ships' hull and pipelines is estimated at 40 years. When fully loaded, they could displace about 14,000 tons while carrying about 7,350 tons of various liquids in its onboard storage tanks as well as some dry cargoes. They could transport for example 3,000 tons of fuel oil, 2,500 tons of diesel fuel, 500 tons of jet fuel, 150 tons of lubricating oil, 1,000 tons of fresh water or additionally 100 tons of dry cargo such as food and spare parts to a distance of 8,000 mi (13,000 km) at a top speed of 16 kn (30 km/h; 18 mph). The total deadweight of the ship is 9,000 tons at maximal draught.

== Ships ==
Name	Builder	Laid down	Launched	Commissioned	Fleet	Status
Academic Pashin	Nevsky Shipyard, Saint Petersburg	26 April 2014	26 May 2016	21 January 2020	Northern	Active
Vasiliy Nikitin	Nevsky Shipyard, Saint Petersburg	26 March 2021	5 October 2023	23 April 2025	Assigned to the Black Sea Fleet but likely to operate in the Baltic/Atlantic at least for the duration of the Russo-Ukraine War	Commissioned
Admiral Kotov	Nevsky Shipyard, Saint Petersburg	2022	5 December 2024	[Projected by 2028]		Launched
Aleksey Shein	Nevsky Shipyard, Saint Petersburg	16 March 2023	14 July 2026	[Projected by 2028]		Launched
TBD	Nevsky Shipyard, Saint Petersburg			[Projected by 2028]		Ordered
TBD	Nevsky Shipyard, Saint Petersburg			[Projected by 2028]		Ordered

== Deployments ==
In June 2024, Academic Pashin was part of a flotilla of four Russian vessels that will visit Havana from June 12 to June 17. It sailed close to the East Coast of the United States, while remaining in international waters.

== See also ==
- List of active Russian Navy ships
- Future of the Russian Navy
