= Project 03182 replenishment oiler =

Russian replenishment oiler class

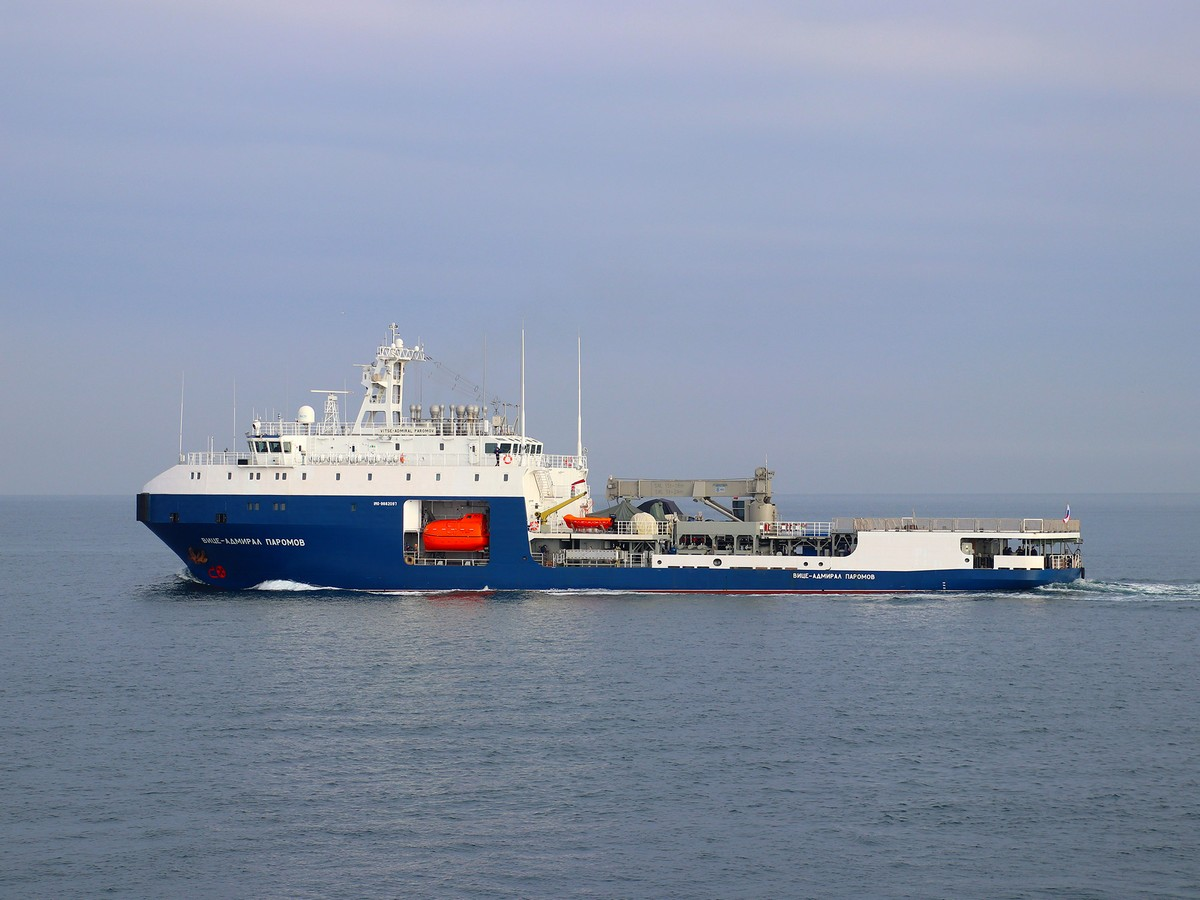
- Vice-admiral Paromov in 2021

Class overview
- Name: Project 03182
- Builders: Volga Shipyard, Nizhny Novgorod; Vostochnaya Verf, Vladivostok
- Operators: Russian Navy
- Preceded by: Project 03180
- Subclasses: Project 03182R
- Built: 2015–present
- In commission: 2021-present
- Planned: 4
- Building: 1
- Completed: 3
- Active: 2

General characteristics
- Type: Replenishment oiler
- Displacement: 1,940 tons (standard load); 3,500 tons (full load)
- Length: 78.8 m (259 ft)
- Beam: 15.4 m (51 ft)
- Draught: 4.9 m (16 ft)
- Propulsion: 2 × 2175 hp electric motors; 3 x 1600 kW diesel-generators; 2 x 400 kW diesel-generators; 2 × Azipod
- Range: 1,500 nmi (2,800 km; 1,700 mi)
- Endurance: 30 days
- Capacity: 1,350 tons
- Complement: 33
- Aviation facilities: 1 x helipad

Project 03182 is a series of small-size replenishment oilers being built for the Russian Navy. The Russian Defense Ministry ordered four small tankers of the project in 2014–2015, with two vessels being built by Volga Shipyard for the Black Sea Fleet, while two are being built by Vostochnaya Verf for the Pacific Fleet.

Vessels of the class are intended to be able to perform a variety of different missions, including patrolling navigational areas, search and rescue, and transporting both liquid and dry cargo. They are also able to operate at any latitude, including beyond the Arctic Circle.

== Ships ==
Name	Builder	Laid down	Launched	Commissioned	Fleet	Status
Mikhail Barskov	Vostochnaya Verf	27 October 2015	27 August 2019		Pacific Fleet	Launched
Vice-admiral Paromov	Volga Shipyard	1 September 2016	20 December 2018	29 May 2021	Black Sea Fleet	Active
Valentin Rykov (ex-Vasiliy Nikitin)	Volga Shipyard	10 March 2017	20 August 2021	1 August 2026	Black Sea Fleet, but operating in the Baltic	Active
Boris Averkin	Vostochnaya Verf	6 February 2018			Pacific Fleet	Laid down

== See also ==
- List of active Russian Navy ships
- Future of the Russian Navy
