= Lüneburg-class replenishment ship =

Class of German Navy replenishment ships

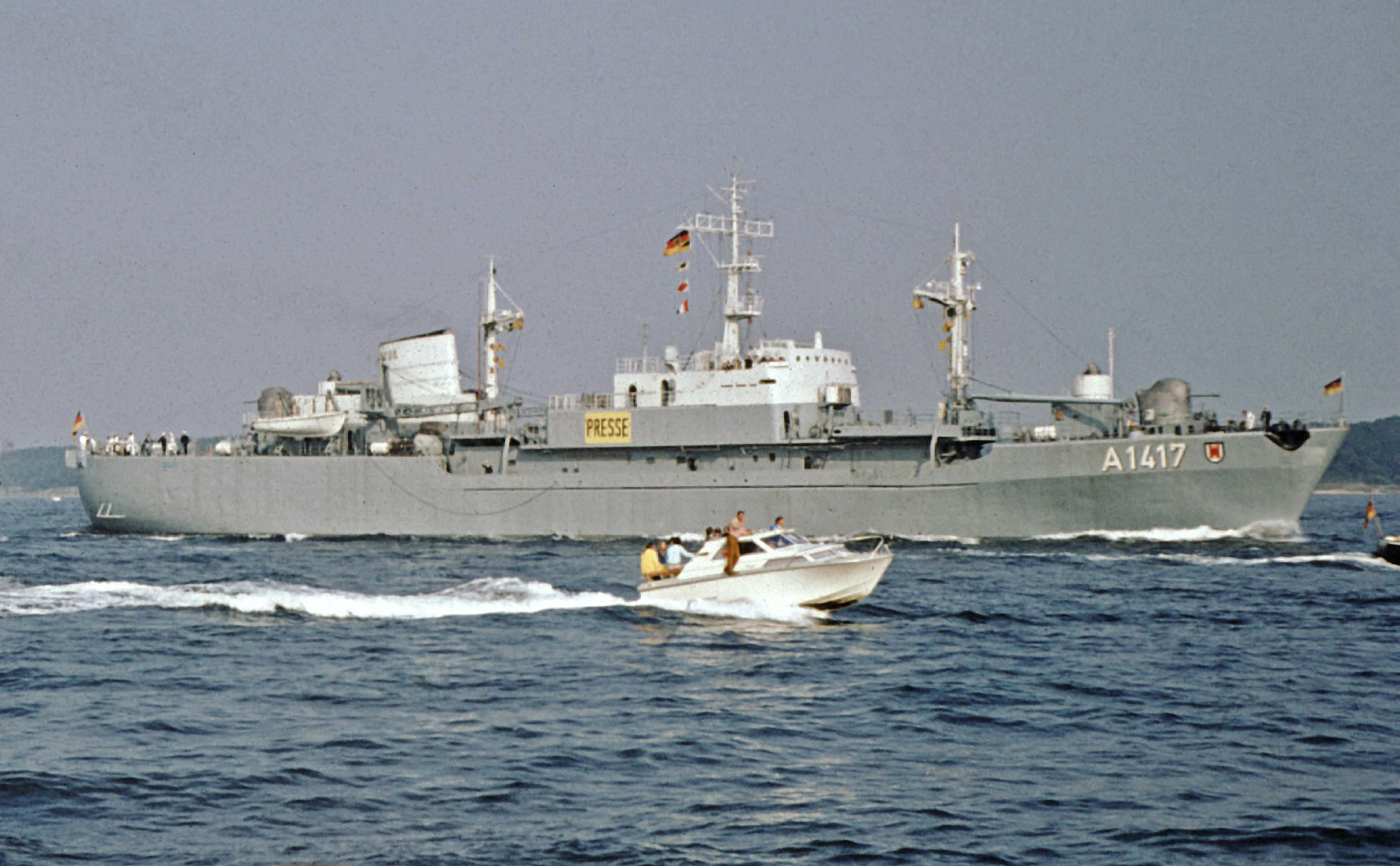
- Offenburg

Class overview
- Name: Lüneburg class
- Builders: Bremer Vulkan; AG Weser; Blohm+Voss; Thyssen Nordseewerke; Howaldtswerke-Deutsche Werft; Flensburger Schiffbau-Gesellschaft
- Operators: German Navy; Hellenic Navy; Egyptian Navy; Colombian National Navy; National Navy of Uruguay
- Cost: DM 65 million
- Built: 1963-1966
- In commission: 1966-2004
- Planned: 8
- Completed: 8
- Retired: 8

General characteristics
- Type: Replenishment ship
- Displacement: 3,770 tonnes (3,710 long tons) (A); 3,483 tonnes (3,428 long tons) (B); 3,770 tonnes (3,710 long tons) (C); 3,710 tonnes (3,650 long tons) (D); 3,984 tonnes (3,921 long tons) (E)
- Length: 118 m (387 ft 2 in)
- Beam: 13.23 m (43 ft 5 in)
- Draft: 4.2 m (13 ft 9 in)
- Propulsion: 16 cylinder Mb MD872 diesel engines, 3 × shafts, 2,060 kW (2,760 hp)
- Speed: 12–17 knots (22–31 km/h)
- Complement: 82 crew
- Electronic warfare & decoys: AN/SLQ-25 Nixie
- Armament: 2 × twin Bofors 40mm / L70 guns; FIM-92 Stinger

The Type 701 Lüneburg-class replenishment ship was a class of eight replenishment ships of the German Navy. Each ship in the class bore the name of a German city that ended in -burg.

The ships were not all identical, and they were initially divided into different types such as 701 A and 701 B. Only the Coburg was part of the Type 701 B, as it was able to carry heavy fuel oil (NATO code: F82) in addition to diesel fuel.

All units of the Type 701 ships have now been decommissioned. After the service period, which usually lasted around 30 years, they were no longer able to meet the growing demands of the fleet. Today their tasks are partly carried out by the tenders of the Elbe class, but mainly by the task force suppliers (EGV) of the Berlin-class (Type 702).

== Development ==
The supply ships of the German Navy are used to provide operational supply (logistical support) to units at sea. They supply the combat units (destroyers, frigates, speedboats, minehunters , submarines, minesweepers, etc.) with operating materials, consumables and durables, provisions and ammunition in order to ensure their operational capability, to enlarge their operational radius and to make them independent of ports.

The suppliers of the Lüneburg-class were assigned to certain units or associations and ability to conduct replenishment at sea. They were able to hand over goods, liquids and personnel during the journey from ship to ship. The eight ships were at times part of the supply chain, so that the assigned ships and boats were also supplied by these suppliers in the port.

== Design ==
In the 1970s, new sea target weapon systems for combat units were introduced, which meant that the supply units for the storage and transport of these new systems had to be modified. Since the previous structure of the ships was not sufficiently suitable for this, five Type 701 ships were converted at MWB Motorenwerke Bremerhaven in Bremerhaven between 1975 and 1984 and were given the suffix C, D and E.

The five ships were not all rebuilt in the same way:

- Coburg, Glücksburg, Saarburg and Meersburg, a new section with a length of 10.5 m was added between departments VI and VII.
- Freiburg was even extended by 14.3 m at the same point because a helicopter landing deck was being built on the Schanz.

Since the ships already had poor maneuverability before the conversion, all eight units of the type were successively equipped with a transverse thrust system (bow thruster) in the foredeck and with a new rudder system.

=== Equipment ===
==== Active roll damping system ====
The ships of this class had an active roll damping system, which was intended to stabilize the ship, especially when it was being supplied at sea. As a rule, however, it was not used, since when approaching closely or even in a collision there was a risk that the deployed elements would damage the ship to be supplied.

==== Data processing ====
The ships were equipped with data technology from Nixdorf Computer from 1973 (starting with the Freiburg). At that time, it allowed a highly modern target and requirement calculation for the supplies carried.

== Ships of class ==
Pennant number	Name	Type	Builders	Launched	Commissioned	Decommissioned	Status
Lüneburg-class replenishment ship
A1411	Lüneburg	A		3 May 1965	31 January 1966	2 June 1994	Sold to Colombia as ARC Cartagena de Indias (BM-161)
A1412	Coburg	B/D	Flensburger Schiffbau-Gesellschaft	15 December 1965	9 July 1968	19 December 2001	Sold to Greece as HS Axios (A464)
A1413	Freiburg	E	Blohm+Voss; Flensburger Schiffbau-Gesellschaft	15 April 1966	27 May 1968	17 December 2003	Sold to Uruguay as General Artigas (ROU04)
A1414	Glücksburg	C	Flensburger Schiffbau-Gesellschaft	3 May 1966	9 July 1968	1 November 2001	Sold to Egypt as ENS Shalatein (A230)
A1415	Saarburg	C		15 July 1966	30 July 1968	14 April 1994	Sold to Greece as HS Aliakmon (A470)
A1416	Nienburg	A		28 July 1966	1 August 1968	26 March 1998	Sold to Colombia as ARC Buenaventura (BL162)
A1417	Offenburg	A		10 September 1966	27 May 1968	30 June 1993	Sold to Spain
A1418	Meersburg	C			25 June 1968	22 December 2004	Mothballed at Marinearsenal (MArs) at Wilhelmshaven
