= Project 03180 replenishment oiler =

Russian replenishment oiler class

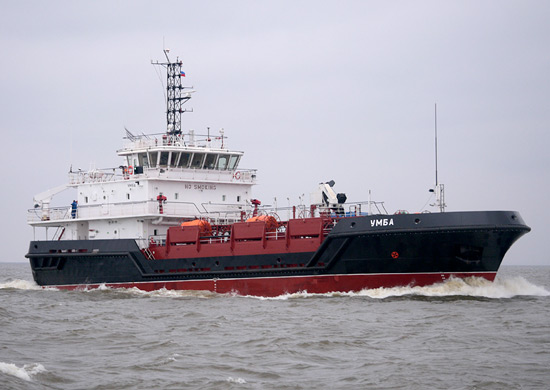
- Umba

Class overview
- Name: Project 03180
- Builders: Pella Shipyard, Otradny
- Operators: Russian Navy
- Subclasses: Project 03182
- Built: 2012–2014
- In commission: 2014–present
- Planned: 4
- Completed: 4
- Active: 4

General characteristics
- Type: Replenishment oiler
- Displacement: 1,069 tons (standard load); 2,269 tons (full load)
- Length: 50.6 m (166 ft)
- Beam: 14 m (46 ft)
- Draught: 5 m (16 ft)
- Propulsion: 2 × 1320 hp Caterpillar C32 diesels, 3 x 150 kW diesel-generators, 1 x 65 kW diesel-generators, 2 × azimuth thrusters, 1 x bow thruster
- Speed: 9 kn (17 km/h; 10 mph)
- Range: 1,500 nmi (2,800 km; 1,700 mi)
- Endurance: 10 days
- Complement: 14

Project 03180 is a series of small-size replenishment oilers in service with the Russian Navy.

== Ships ==
Name	Builder	Laid down	Launched	Commissioned	Fleet	Status
Umba	Pella Shipyard		21 December 2012	February 2014	Northern Fleet	Active
Pecha	Pella Shipyard		11 June 2013	February 2014	Northern Fleet	Active
VTN-73 (ex-Luga)	Pella Shipyard		11 January 2014	27 November 2014	Black Sea Fleet	Active
Alexandr Grebenschikov (ex-VTN-74)	Pella Shipyard		4 September 2014	30 December 2014	Baltic Fleet	Active

== See also ==
- List of active Russian Navy ships
- Future of the Russian Navy
