= Dubna-class tanker =

Soviet replenishment oiler class

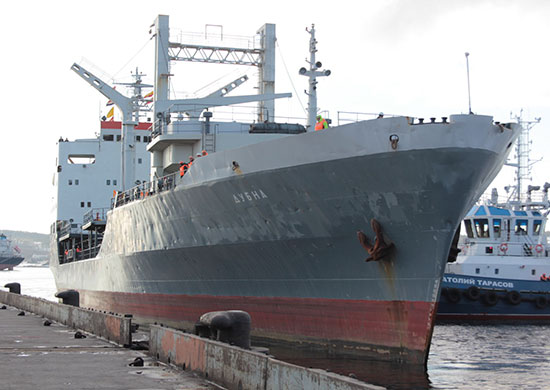
- Dubna in 2017

Class overview
- Name: Dubna class
- Builders: Rauma-Repola, Finland
- Operators: Soviet Navy; Russian Navy; Ukrainian Navy
- Preceded by: Altay class
- Succeeded by: Kaliningradneft class
- Built: 1974–1978
- In commission: 1974–present
- Completed: 4
- Active: 3
- Retired: 1

General characteristics
- Type: Replenishment oiler
- Displacement: 6,022 tons (standard load); 12,891 tons (full load)
- Length: 130 m (430 ft)
- Beam: 20 m (66 ft)
- Draught: 7.2 m (24 ft)
- Propulsion: 1 × 6000 hp diesel; Dubna and Irkut: 4 x 300 kW diesel-generators; 1 x 160 kW diesel-generators; Pechenga and Sventa: 4 x 500 kW diesel-generators; 1 x 300 kW diesel-generators
- Speed: 16 kn (30 km/h; 18 mph)
- Range: 8,200 nmi (15,200 km; 9,400 mi)
- Endurance: 60 days
- Capacity: 5,250 tons
- Complement: 62
- Sensors & processing systems: Don (navigation radar); MR-212/201 "Vaygach-U" (navigation radar)

The Dubna class is a series of medium-size replenishment oilers built for the Soviet Navy between 1974 and 1978.

Sventa was transferred to the Ukrainian Navy following the breakup of the Soviet Union, and renamed to Kerch in July 1997.

== Ships ==
Name	Builder	Laid down	Launched	Commissioned	Fleet	Status
Dubna	Rauma-Repola		15 January 1974	1 December 1974	Northern Fleet	Active
Irkut	Rauma-Repola		11 April 1975	30 December 1975	Pacific Fleet	Active
Pechenga	Rauma-Repola	31 October 1977	3 February 1978	12 January 1979	Pacific Fleet	Active
Kerch (ex-Sventa)	Rauma-Repola		25 August 1978	April 1979	Black Sea Fleet	Scrapped in 2004

== Gallery ==
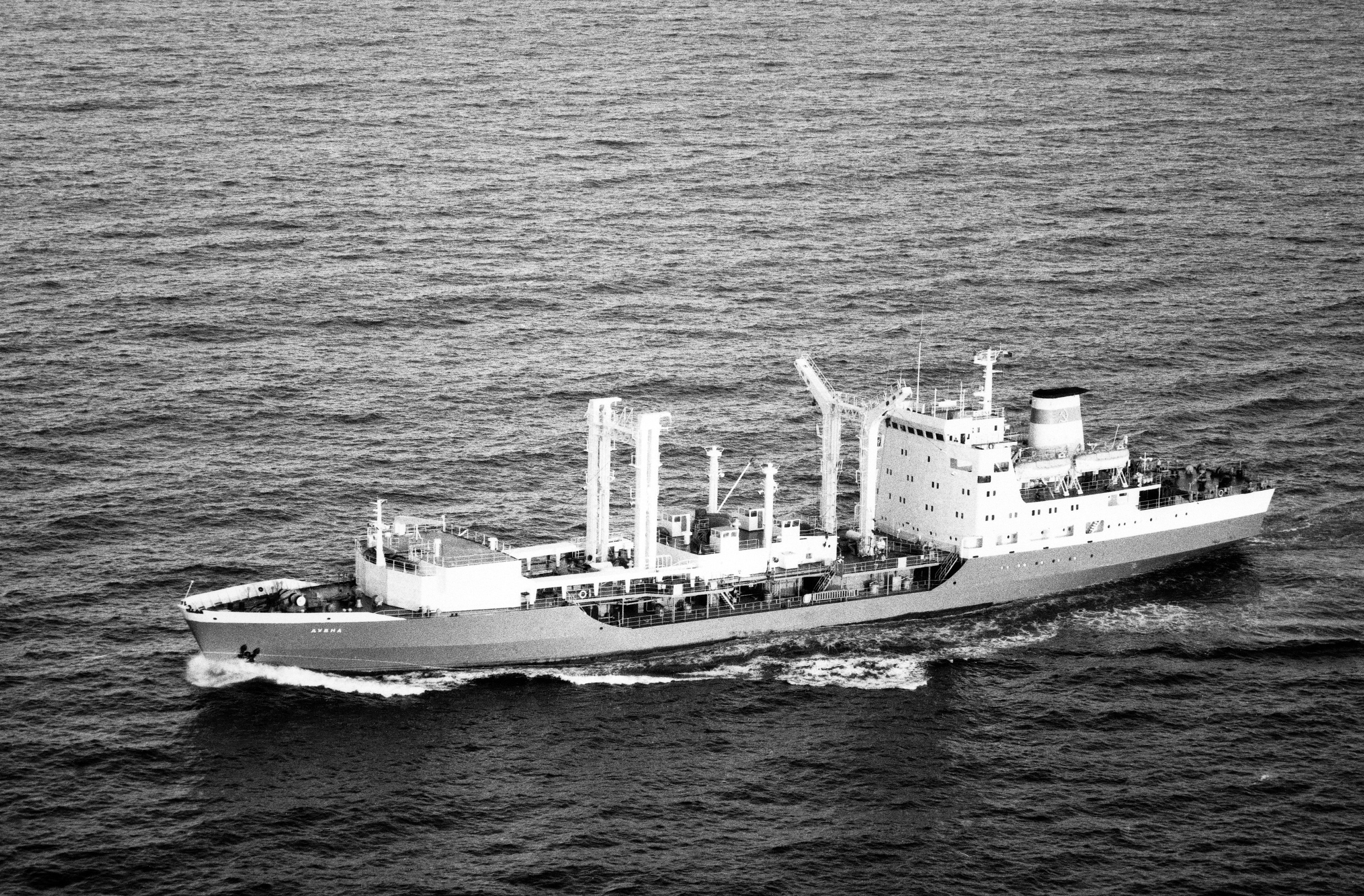
Dubna in 1987

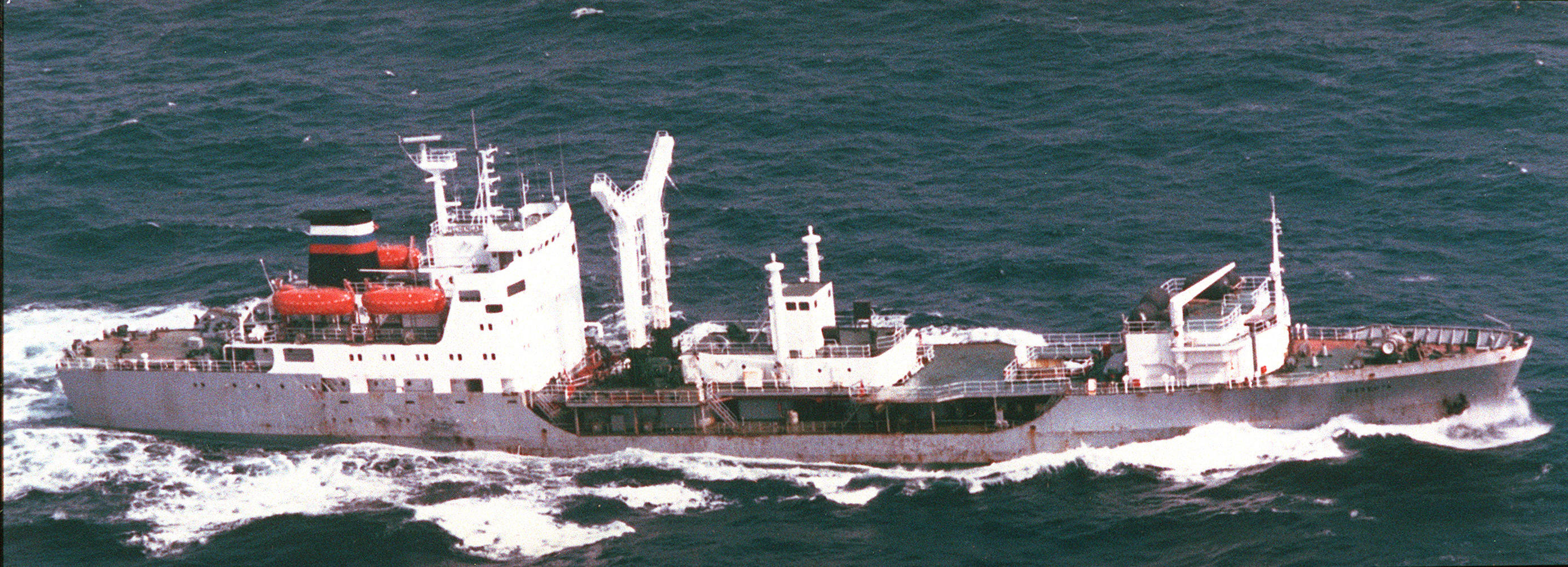
Pechenga in 1994

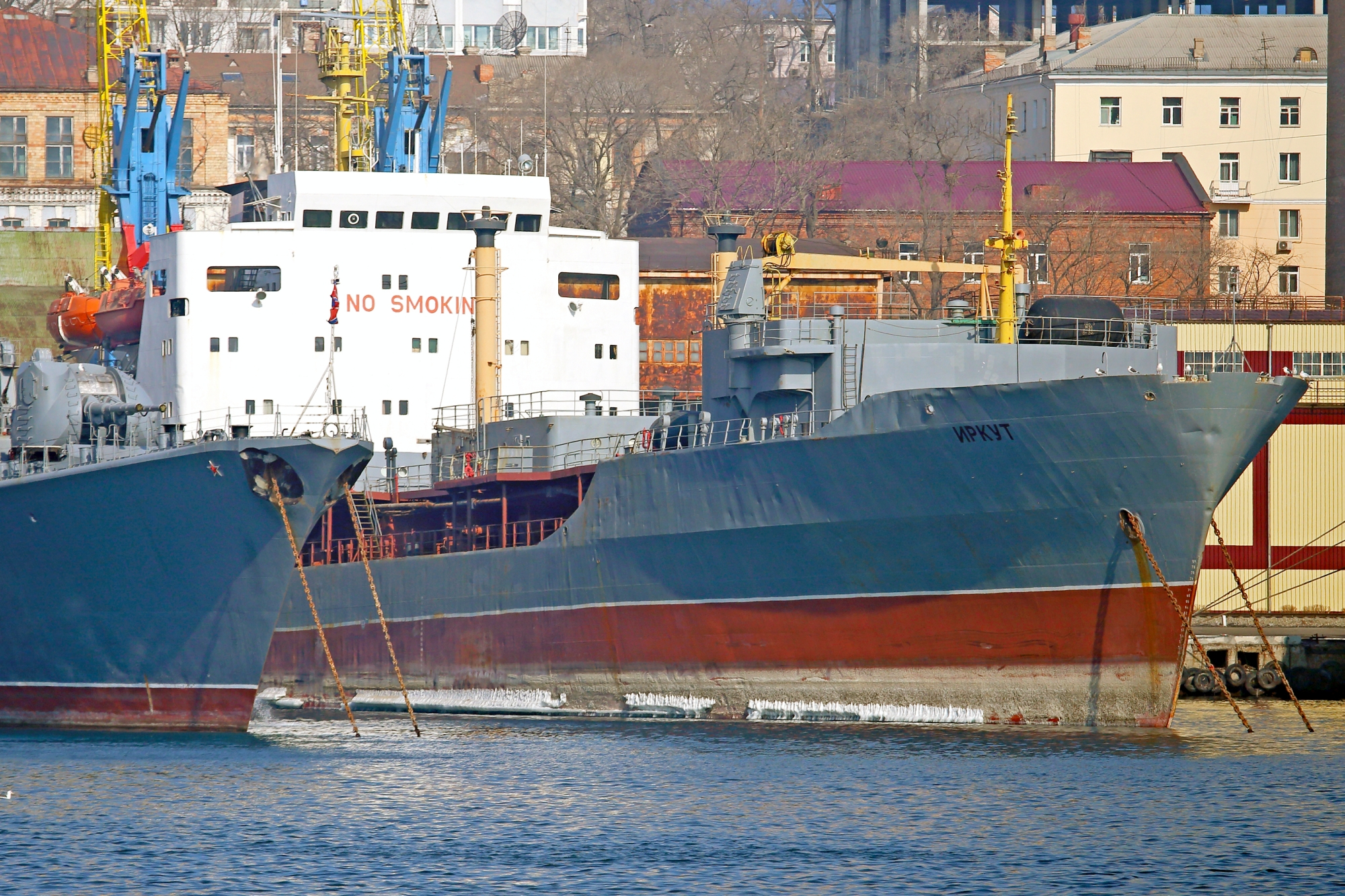
Irkut in 2015

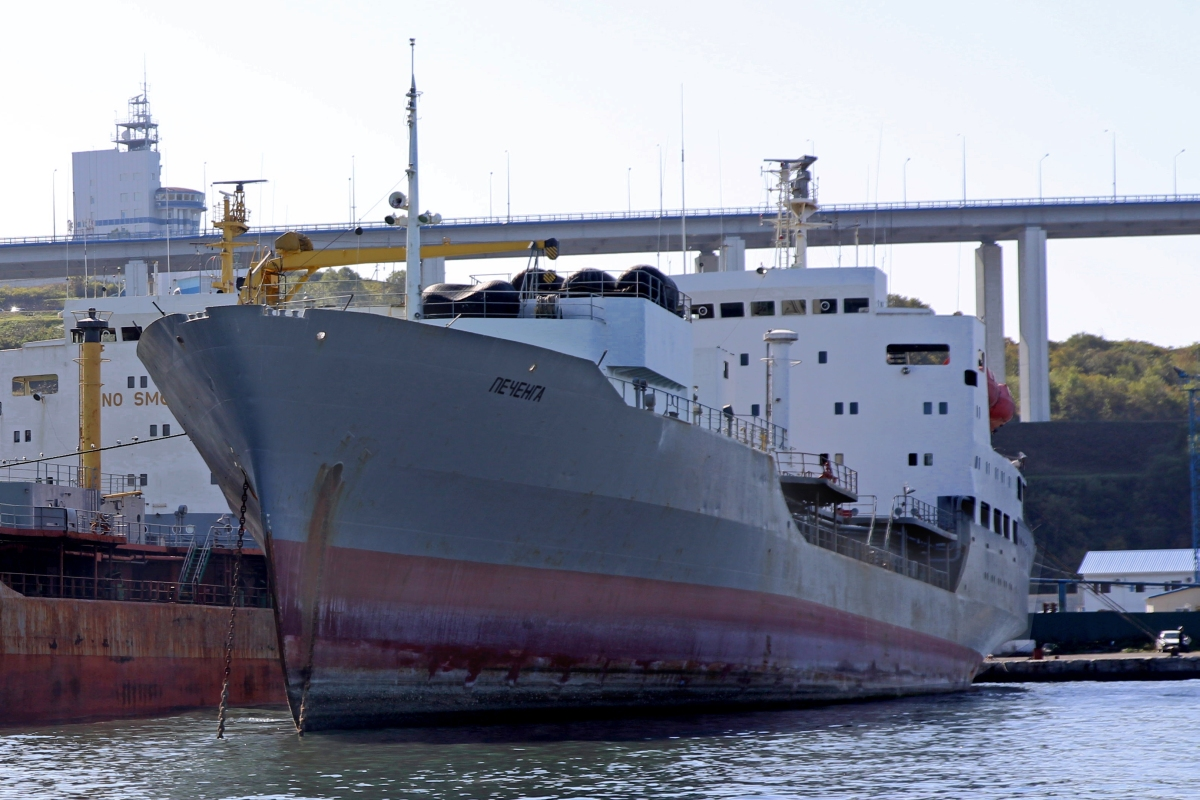
Pechenga in 2017

== See also ==
- List of active Russian Navy ships
- List of former warships of the Ukrainian Navy
