= Olekma-class oiler =

Soviet replenishment oiler class

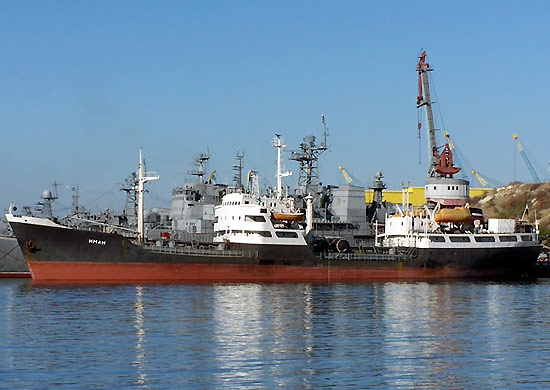
- Iman docking in Syria, 2012

Class overview
- Name: Project 6404
- Builders: Rauma-Repola, Finland
- Operators: Soviet Navy; Russian Navy
- Preceded by: Uda class
- Succeeded by: Altay class
- Built: 1964–1966
- In commission: 1964–present
- Completed: 2
- Active: 1
- Retired: 1

General characteristics
- Type: Replenishment oiler
- Displacement: 2,040 tons (standard load); 6,480 tons (full load)
- Length: 105.4 m (346 ft)
- Beam: 14.78 m (48.5 ft)
- Draught: 6.09 m (20.0 ft)
- Propulsion: 1 × 2900 hp BW-550VTBF-110 diesel; 2 x 168 kW diesel-generators; 1 x 8 kW diesel-generators; 1 x 60 kW steam-dynamo
- Speed: 14.2 kn (26.3 km/h; 16.3 mph)
- Range: 4,000 nmi (7,400 km; 4,600 mi)
- Endurance: 20 days
- Capacity: 4,050 tons
- Complement: 40
- Sensors & processing systems: Donets-2 (navigation radar); SFP4/N PLATH (radio direction finder)

The Olekma class (Soviet designation Project 6404) is a series of medium-size replenishment oilers built for the Soviet Navy between 1964 and 1966.

== Ships ==
| Name | Builder | Laid down | Launched | Commissioned | Fleet | Status |
|---|---|---|---|---|---|---|
| Olekma | Rauma-Repola | | 21 March 1964 | 19 July 1964 | Baltic Fleet | Decommissioned in 2012 |
| Iman | Rauma-Repola | | 3 June 1966 | 3 September 1966 | Black Sea Fleet | Active |

== See also ==
- List of active Russian Navy ships
