= Kaliningradneft-class tanker =

Soviet replenishment oiler class

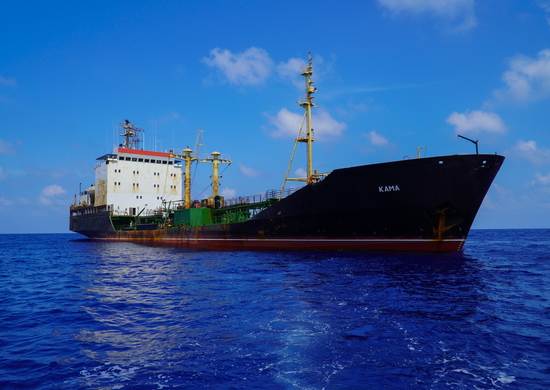
- Kama in 2023

Class overview
- Name: Kaliningradneft class
- Builders: Rauma-Repola, Finland
- Operators: Soviet Navy; Russian Navy
- Preceded by: Dubna class
- Succeeded by: Project 23130
- Built: 1981–1982
- In commission: 1982–present
- Completed: 2
- Active: 2

General characteristics
- Type: Replenishment oiler
- Displacement: 3,050 tons (standard load); 8,913 tons (full load)
- Length: 115.5 m (379 ft)
- Beam: 17.03 m (55.9 ft)
- Draught: 7 m (23 ft)
- Propulsion: 1 × 3500 hp BW-550VTBF-110 diesel; 3 x 264 kW diesel-generators
- Speed: 14 kn (26 km/h; 16 mph)
- Range: 5,000 nmi (9,300 km; 5,800 mi)
- Endurance: 50 days
- Capacity: 5,200 tons
- Complement: 32
- Sensors & processing systems: Okean M-18 (navigation radar); SEP705LN6 (radio direction finder)

The Kaliningradneft class (Soviet designation Project REF-675) is a series of medium-size replenishment oilers built for the Soviet Navy between 1981 and 1982.

== Ships ==
Name	Builder	Laid down	Launched	Commissioned	Fleet	Status
Kama (ex-Argun)	Rauma-Repola	4 December 1981	19 March 1982	29 September 1982	Northern Fleet	Active
Vyazma	Rauma-Repola		1 July 1982	29 September 1982	Northern Fleet	Active

== See also ==
- List of active Russian Navy ships
