= Valentin Pashin =

Russian naval engineer (1937–2013)

Valentin Mikhailovich Pashin (Russian: Валентин Михайлович Пашин; 25 July 1937 – 15 December 2013) was a Russian naval engineer.

Pashin was born in 1937, in the Saratov Oblast of the Russian SSR. He studied at the Leningrad Shipbuilding Institute, from which he graduated in 1960, and joined the Krylov Research Institute, a shipbuilding research unitary enterprise where he would spend his entire career, and lead the institute for over 22 years.

== Awards and honours ==
In 1985, Pashin was awarded the USSR State Prize. He became a Corresponding Member of the Russian Academy of Sciences in 1991, and a Full Member in 1995. In October 1994, Pashin was awarded the Gold Star medal as a Hero of the Russian Federation for "courage and heroism displayed during the performance of special operations".

== See also ==
- List of Heroes of the Russian Federation
