= Altay-class oiler =

Soviet class of replenishment oiler

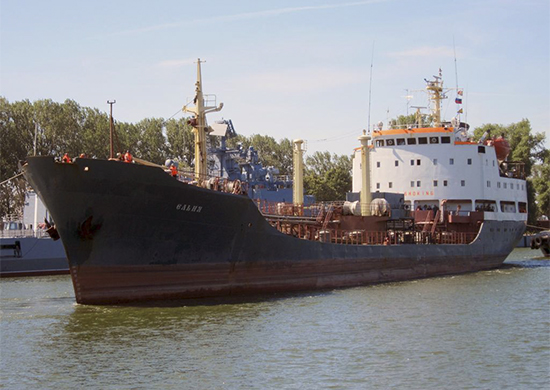
- Yel'nya in 2018

Class overview
- Name: Project 160 (NATO: Altay class)
- Builders: Rauma-Repola, Finland
- Operators: Soviet Navy; Russian Navy
- Preceded by: Olekma class
- Succeeded by: Dubna class
- Built: 1967–1972
- In commission: 1968–present
- Completed: 6
- Active: 4?
- Retired: 2

General characteristics
- Type: Replenishment oiler
- Displacement: 7,230 tons full load
- Length: 106.17 m (348 ft 4 in)
- Beam: 15.4 m (50 ft 6 in)
- Draught: 6.7 m (22 ft 0 in)
- Propulsion: 1 B&W-550 VTBN-110 diesel engine; 3,250 bhp (2,420 kW); 1 shaft
- Speed: 14 knots (26 km/h; 16 mph)
- Range: 5,000 nmi (9,300 km; 5,800 mi) at 13 knots (24 km/h; 15 mph); 8,600 nmi (15,900 km; 9,900 mi) at 12 knots (22 km/h; 14 mph)
- Capacity: 1,300 tons heavy oil; 2,700 tons distilled fuel; 200 tons water; 100 tons lube oil
- Complement: 60
- Sensors & processing systems: 2 Don-2 (navigation); NEL-5 (sonar); MGL-25 (underwater telephone)
- Electronic warfare & decoys: IFF

The Altay class, Soviet designation Project 160, is a class of replenishment oiler built for the Soviet Navy between 1967 and 1972.

== Construction ==
The Altay-class vessels were built for the USSR by the Finnish shipbuilding yard Rauma-Repola. Over 60 vessels of this type were built for Soviet service, most with the fishing fleet and merchant fleet. Only six vessels were ordered for service with the Soviet Navy. Project 160 tankers can refuel one ship at a time from either side or over the stern.

== Operational history ==
=== 1993 Yel'nya incident ===
In April 1993, while in reserve with the Black Sea Fleet at Sevastopol, Yel'nya was taken over by Ukrainian dissidents. After a brief seizure, control was reestablished by the Russian Navy. Yel'nya was later transferred to the Baltic Fleet.

=== 2021 Kola Gulf of Suez collision and Suez Canal obstruction ===
On 23 March 2021, Kola, along with Steregushchiy-class corvette Stoikiy, were in the northern part of the Gulf of Suez when Kola collided with civilian bulk carrier Ark Royal. The two ships, which were both approaching Suez, sustained light damage, according to the Russian Navy. Kola and Ark Royal resumed sailing after the collision.

That same day, Kola and Stoikiy were in the Gulf of Suez when the container ship Ever Given ran aground in the Suez Canal, completely obstructing the canal. Kola, along with Stoikiy and around 350 other ships on both sides of the canal, were forced to wait for the Ever Given to be refloated. Initially, Kola and Stoikiy were the only known military vessels to have been affected by the obstruction, however since normally military ships do not transmit their position to commercial websites, an unknown number of military ships were involved, with the Spanish amphibious assault ship Juan Carlos I being among the first ships to move through the canal. At the time of the incident, maritime tracking website vesselfinder.com temporarily misidentified Kola as Stoikiy (specifically "Russian Warship 545"); this was corrected on 25 March. As of 29 March, Kola was still anchored in the Gulf of Suez.

== Ships in class ==
There were six vessels in the class.

Name	Yard No.	Laid down	Launched	Commissioned	Fate
Kola	No. 163	not known	30 July 1967	1967	Still active as of 2021
Yel'nya	No. 168	not known	21 February 1968	June 1968	Active as of 2026
Yergorlik	No. 174	not known	15 November 1968	April 1969	Decommissioned 2007
Izhora	No. 181	not known	21 October 1969	1970	Active as of 2022
Prut	No. 203	not known	30 July 1971	1971	Decommissioned 2011
Ilim	No. 215	not known	21 August 1972	November 1972	Reported in the Pacific Fleet; status unclear

== Gallery ==
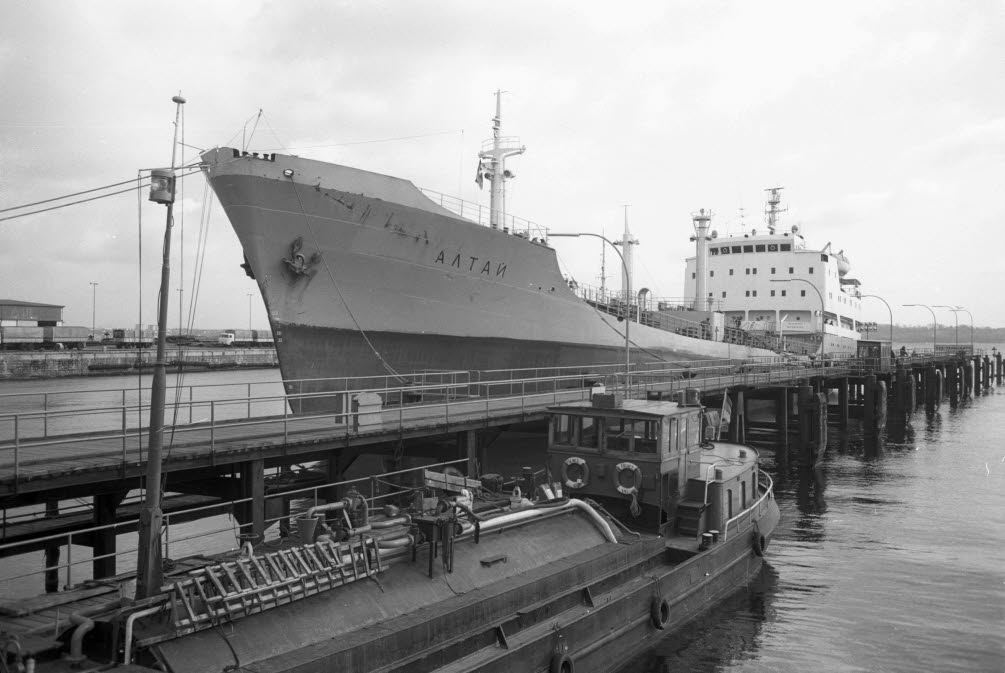
Altay – the civilian type ship of the class.
