= Replenishment oiler =

Naval auxiliary ship

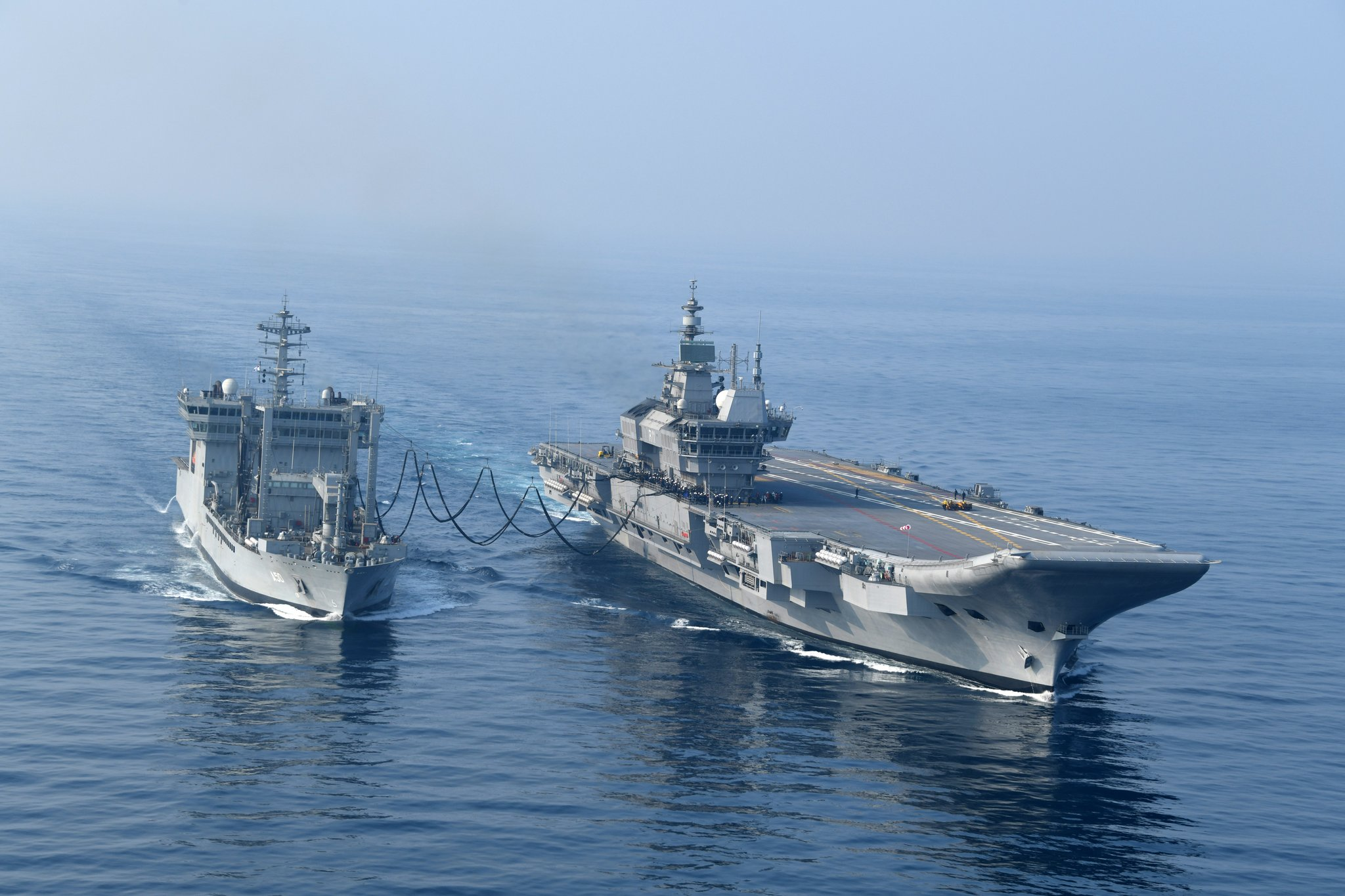
INS Deepak (left) conducting replenishment at sea with aircraft carrier INS Vikrant.

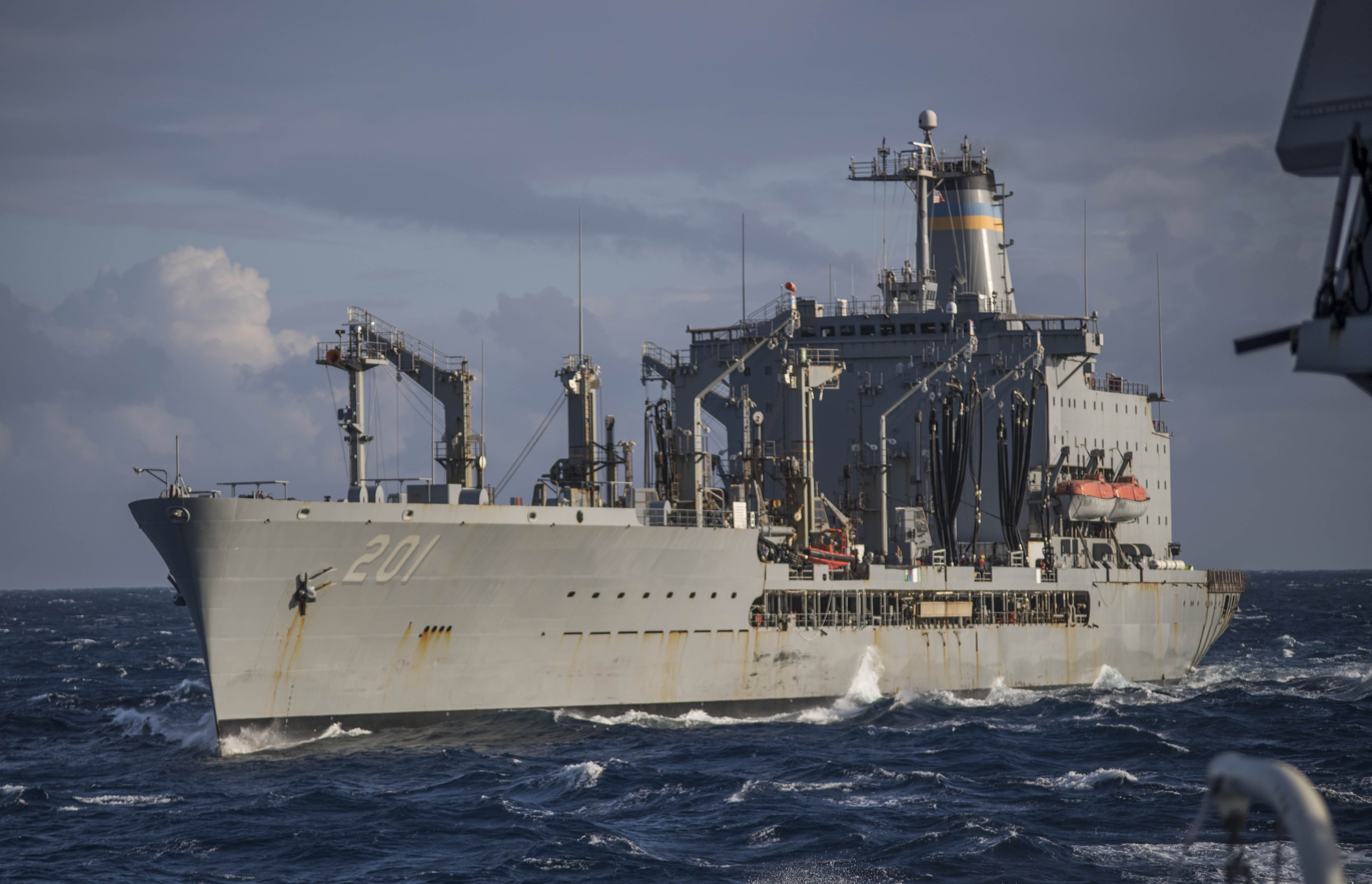
Fleet replenishment oiler USNS Patuxent

A replenishment oiler or replenishment tanker is a naval auxiliary ship with fuel tanks and dry cargo holds which can supply both fuel and dry stores during underway replenishment (UNREP) at sea. Many countries have used replenishment oilers.

The United States Navy's hull classification symbol for this type of ship was 'AOR' (Auxiliary Oil Replenishment). Replenishment oilers are slower and carry fewer dry stores than the US Navy's modern fast combat support ships, which carry the classification 'AOE'. In 2020 the US Navy began to develop a new type of ship, the 'AOL' or light replenishment oiler; construction of the first is planned for 2026.

== History ==
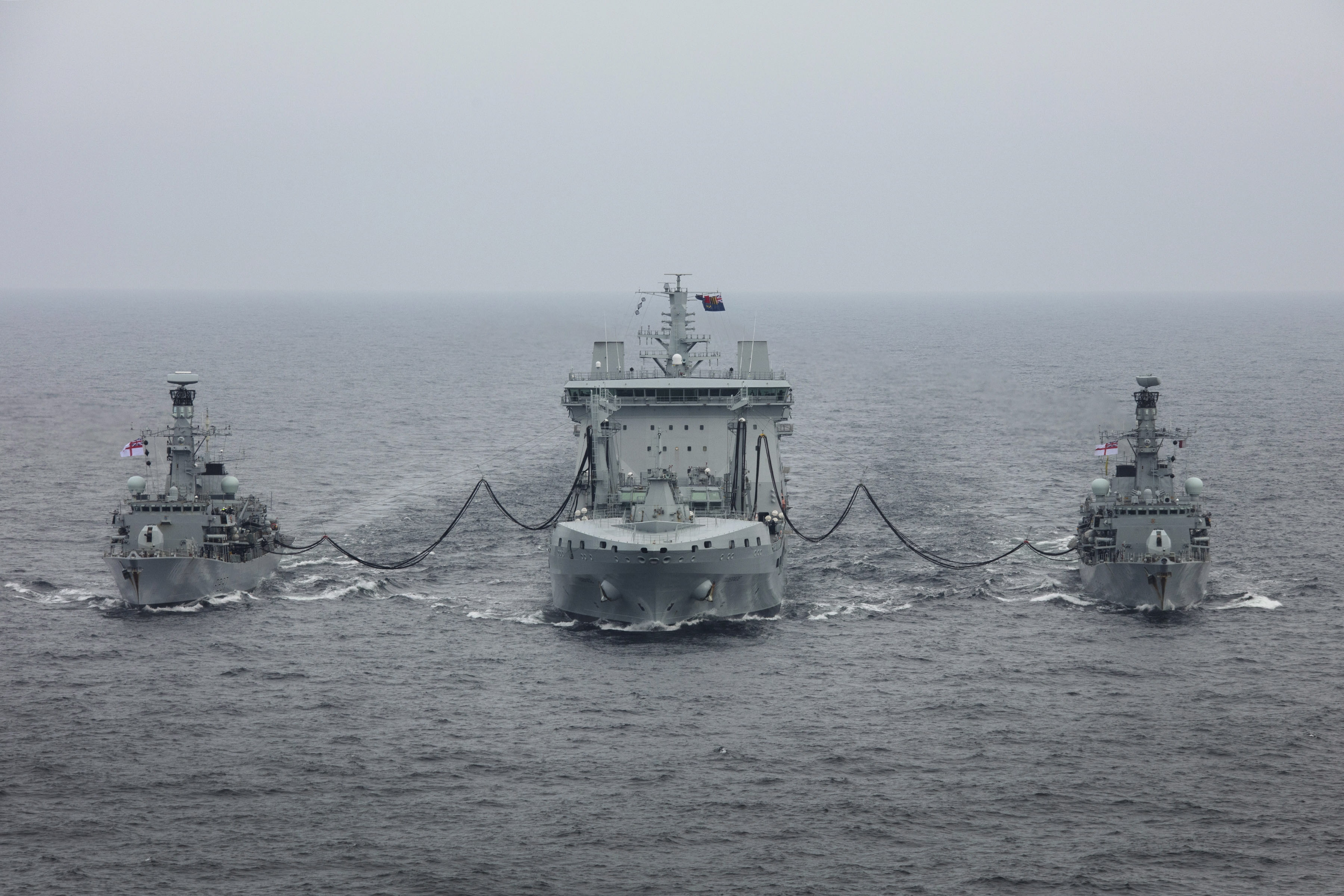
RFA Tiderace performing a dual repenishment of Royal Navy frigates HMS Lancaster and HMS Westminster.

The development of the "oiler" paralleled the change from coal- to oil-fired boilers in warships. Prior to the adoption of oil fired machinery, navies could extend the range of their ships either by maintaining coaling stations or for warships to raft together with colliers and for coal to be manhandled aboard. Though arguments related to fuel security were made against such a change, the ease with which liquid fuel could be transferred led in part to its adoption by navies worldwide.

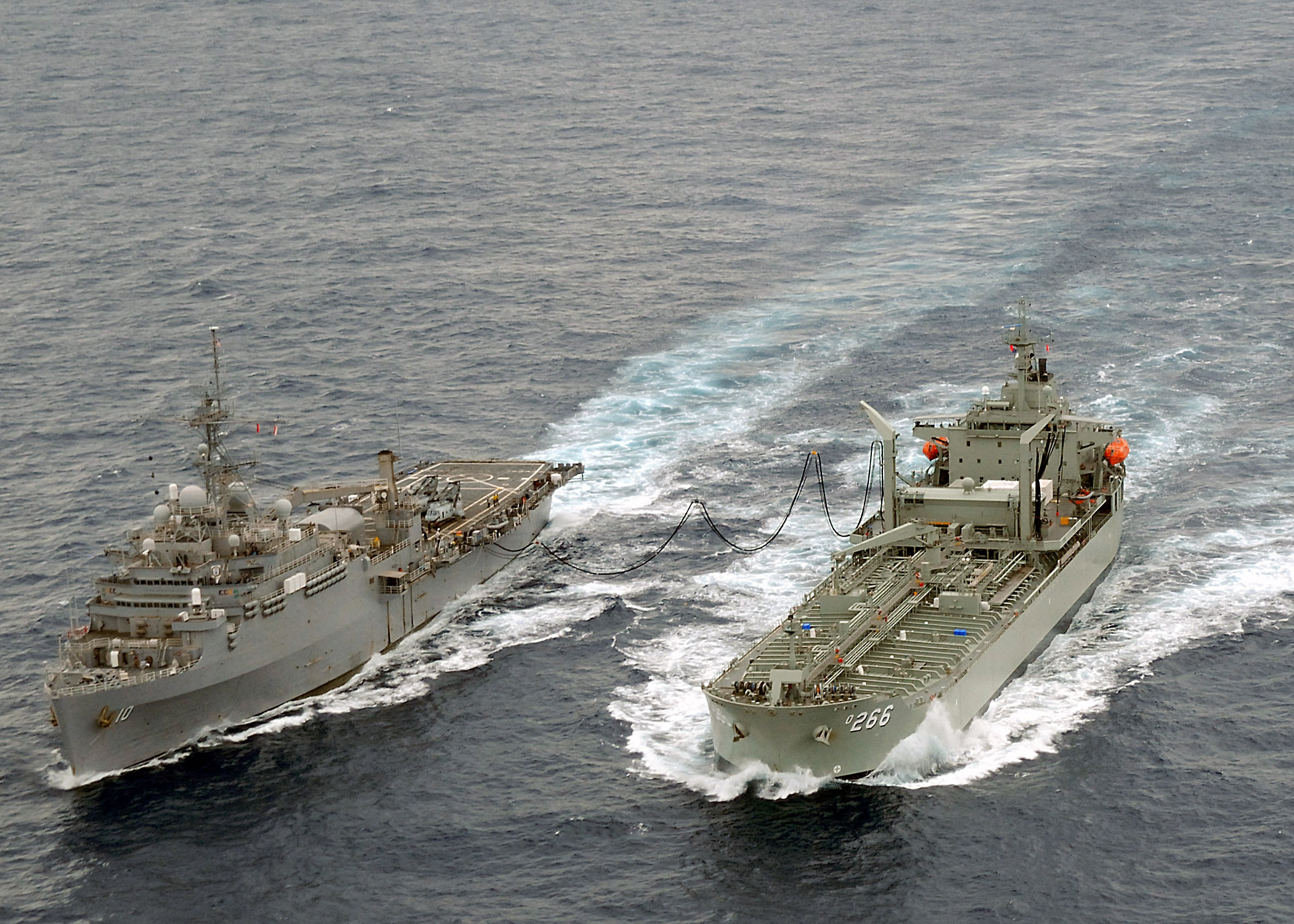
The replenishment oiler HMAS Sirius (right) providing fuel to the amphibious warfare ship USS Juneau while both are underway

One of the first generation of "blue-water" navy oiler support vessels was the British RFA Kharki, active 1911 in the run-up to the First World War. Such vessels heralded the transition from coal to oil as the fuel of warships and removed the need to rely on, and operate within range of coaling stations. During the Second World War, the United States Navy's dramatically enlarged fleets, especially those in the Pacific Theater, required massive quantities of black oil, diesel oil, avgas, and other fuels and lubricants to support American land, sea, and air operations against remote, widely dispersed Japanese forces. Those supply demands resulted in U.S. Navy personnel refining many established practices for oilers and creating new procedures for replenishing warships while underway and for transporting highly combustible materials with increased effectiveness through hostile waters and over vast ocean distances.

== Characteristics ==
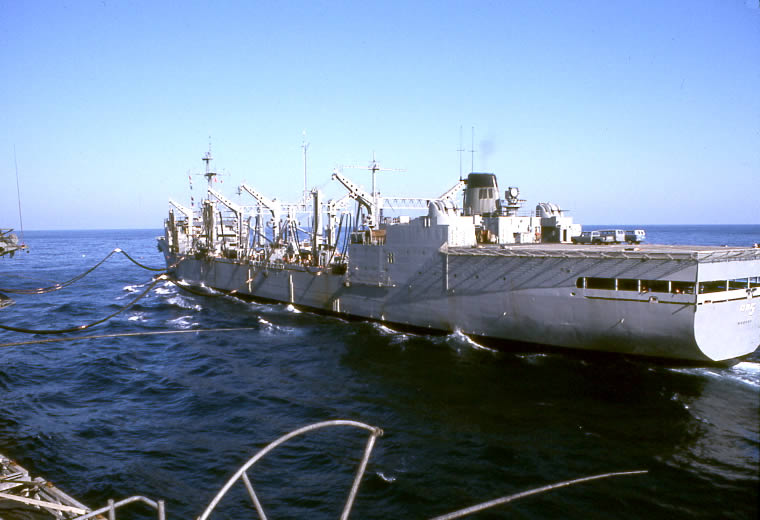
Replenishment oiler USS Wabash at work

For all but the largest navies, replenishment oilers are typically one of the largest ships in the fleet. Such ships are designed to carry large amounts of fuel and dry stores for the support of naval operations far away from port. Replenishment oilers are also equipped with more extensive medical and dental facilities than smaller ships can provide.

Such ships are equipped with multiple refueling gantries to refuel and resupply multiple ships at a time. The process of refueling and supplying ships at sea is called underway replenishment. Furthermore, such ships often are designed with helicopter decks and hangars. This allows the operation of rotary-wing aircraft, which allows the resupply of ships by helicopter. This process is called vertical replenishment. These ships, when operating in concert with surface groups, can act as an aviation maintenance platform where helicopters receive more extensive maintenance than can be provided by the smaller hangars of the escorting ships.

Their size, additional facilities, and ability to support the operation of other vessels, means that replenishment oilers have been used as command ships, with some ships, such as the French Durance class, this capability being built into the vessels from the start.

== Armament ==
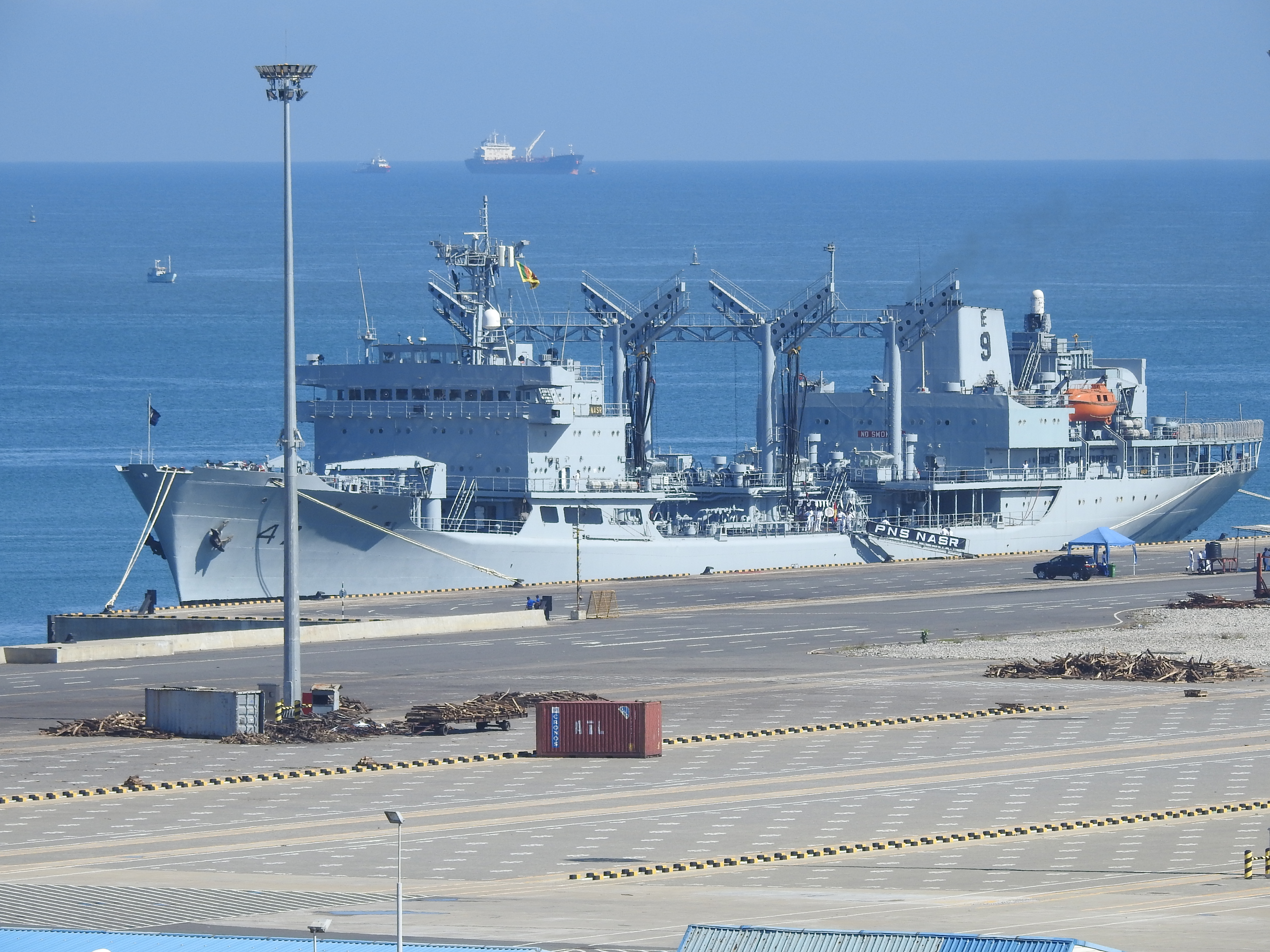
PNS Nasr armed with Phalanx CIWS.

Because the replenishment oiler is not a combat unit, but rather a support vessel, such ships are often lightly armed, usually with self-defense systems (such as the Phalanx CIWS close-in weapons systems), small arms, machine guns and/or light automatic cannons. They may also carry man-portable air-defense systems for additional air defense capability.

== Operators ==
- Argentine Navy operates ARA Patagonia
- Royal Australian Navy operates two Supply-class replenishment oilers.
- Brazilian Navy operates Almirante Gastão Motta
- Royal Canadian Navy operates MV Asterix.
- Chilean Navy operates Almirante Montt and Araucano
- People's Liberation Army Navy operates two Fuyu-class fast combat support ships, four Dayun-class general stores issue ships, nine Fuchi-class replenishment ships, and a single Fusu-class replenishment ship.
- Republic of China Navy operates ROCS Wu Yi and ROCS Panshih
- Colombian National Navy operates two Lüneburg-class replenishment ships, purchased from Germany.
- Egyptian Navy operates a single Lüneburg-class replenishment ship, purchased from Germany (being supplemented or replaced by two Fort Rosalie-class replenishment ships, purchased from the United Kingdom).
- French Navy operates two Jacques Chevallier-class and one Durance-class tankers
- German Navy operates six Elbe-class replenishment ships, two Rhön-class tankers, and three Berlin-class replenishment ships.
- Hellenic Navy operates a single Etna-class replenishment oiler and two Lüneburg-class replenishment ships, purchased from Germany.
- Indian Navy operates two Deepak-class fleet tankers, one Aditya-class auxiliary ship, and a single Komandarm Fedko-class oiler.
- Indonesian Navy operates a single Rover-class tanker purchased from the United Kingdom, two Tarakan-class tankers and more on order.
- Italian Navy operates two Vulcano-class logistic support ship, a single Etna-class replenishment oiler and a single Stromboli-class replenishment oilers.
- Islamic Republic of Iran Navy operates two Bandar Abbas-class replenishment ships.
- Japan Maritime Self-Defense Force operates three Towada-class replenishment ships and two Mashū-class replenishment ships.
- Republic of Korea Navy operates three Cheonji-class fast combat support ships, and ROKS Soyang
- Royal Netherlands Navy operates HNLMS Karel Doorman & HNLMS Den Helder
- Royal New Zealand Navy operates HMNZS Aotearoa
- Royal Norwegian Navy operates HNoMS Maud
- Pakistan Navy operates PNS Nasr and PNS Moawin
- Peruvian Navy operates BAP Tacna
- Polish Navy operates ORP Bałtyk
- Russian Navy operates three Boris Chilikin-class fleet oilers, one Dora-class tanker, one Olekma-class oilers, four Altay-class oilers, three Dubna-class tankers, two Kaliningradneft-class tankers, two Project 23130 replenishment oilers, four Project 03180 replenishment oilers, and a single Project 03182 replenishment oiler.
- Royal Saudi Navy operates two Durance-class tankers.
- South African Navy operates SAS Drakensberg
- Spanish Navy operates Patiño and Cantabria.
- Royal Thai Navy operates HTMS Similan
- Turkish Navy operates two Akar-class replenishment oilers and one Derya class.
- British Royal Fleet Auxiliary operates one Fort Victoria-class replenishment oiler, four Tide-class tankers and two Wave-class tankers (maintained in reserve).
- United States Military Sealift Command operates six John Lewis-class replenishment oilers, thirteen Henry J. Kaiser-class replenishment oilers, fourteen Lewis and Clark-class dry cargo ships, and two Supply-class fast combat support ships.
- National Navy of Uruguay operates a single Lüneburg-class replenishment ship purchased from Germany
- Bolivarian Navy of Venezuela operates RBNV Ciudad Bolívar
- Vietnam People's Navy operates the replenishment oiler HQ-905

=== Former operators ===
- Philippine Navy decommissioned BRP Lake Caliraya in 2020.
- Portuguese Navy decommissioned NRP Bérrio in 2020. Two new Luís de Camões-class vessels under construction.
- Ukrainian Navy decommissioned its only Boris Chilikin-class fleet oiler in 2001.

== United States Navy oilers ==
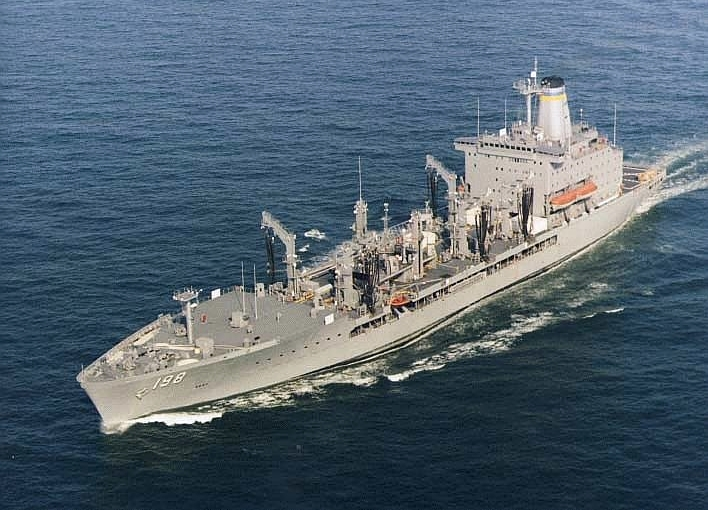
USNS Big Horn, an underway replenishment oiler.

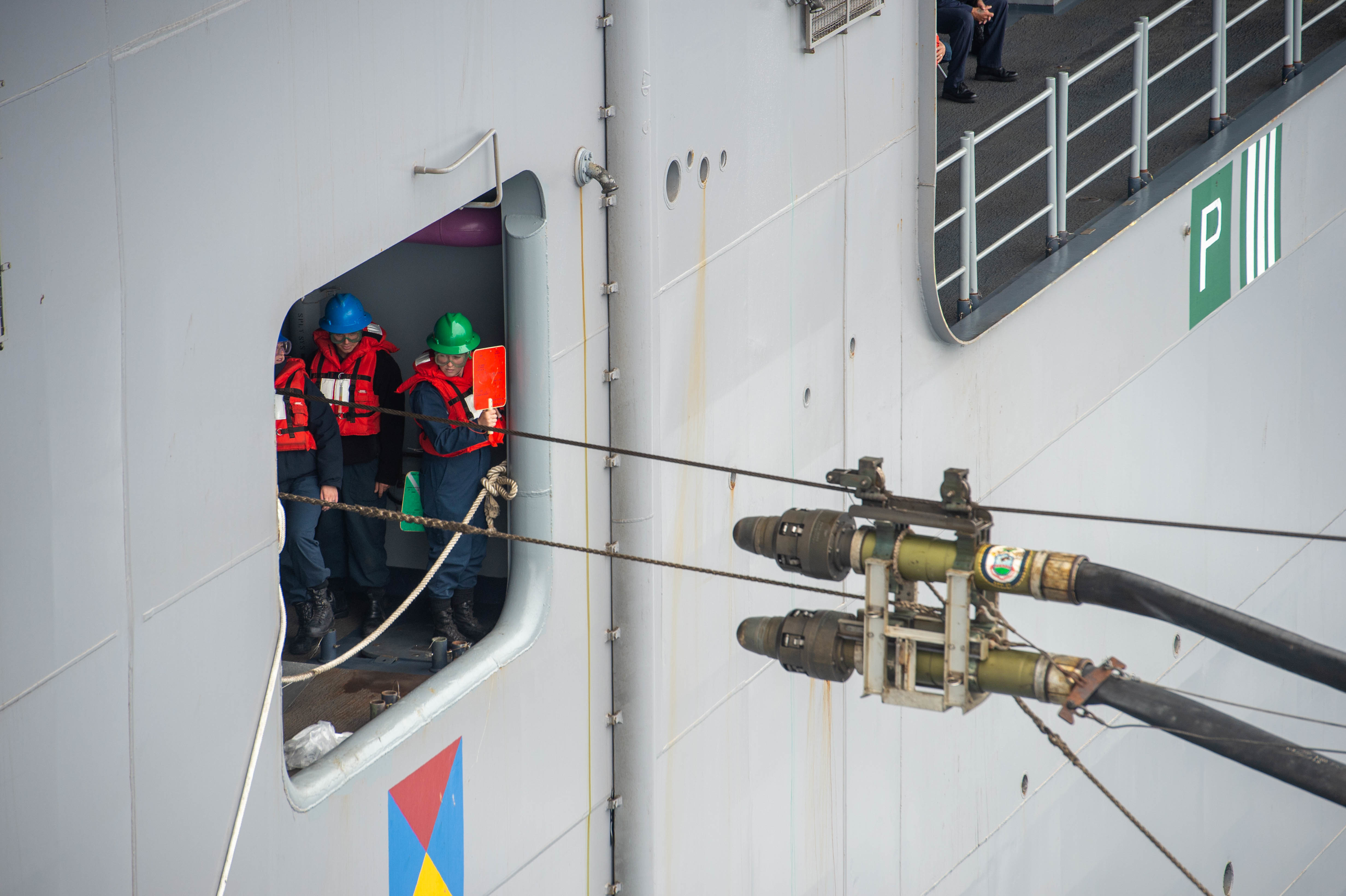
US sailors aboard USS Makin Island prepare to receive replenishment from USNS Yukon

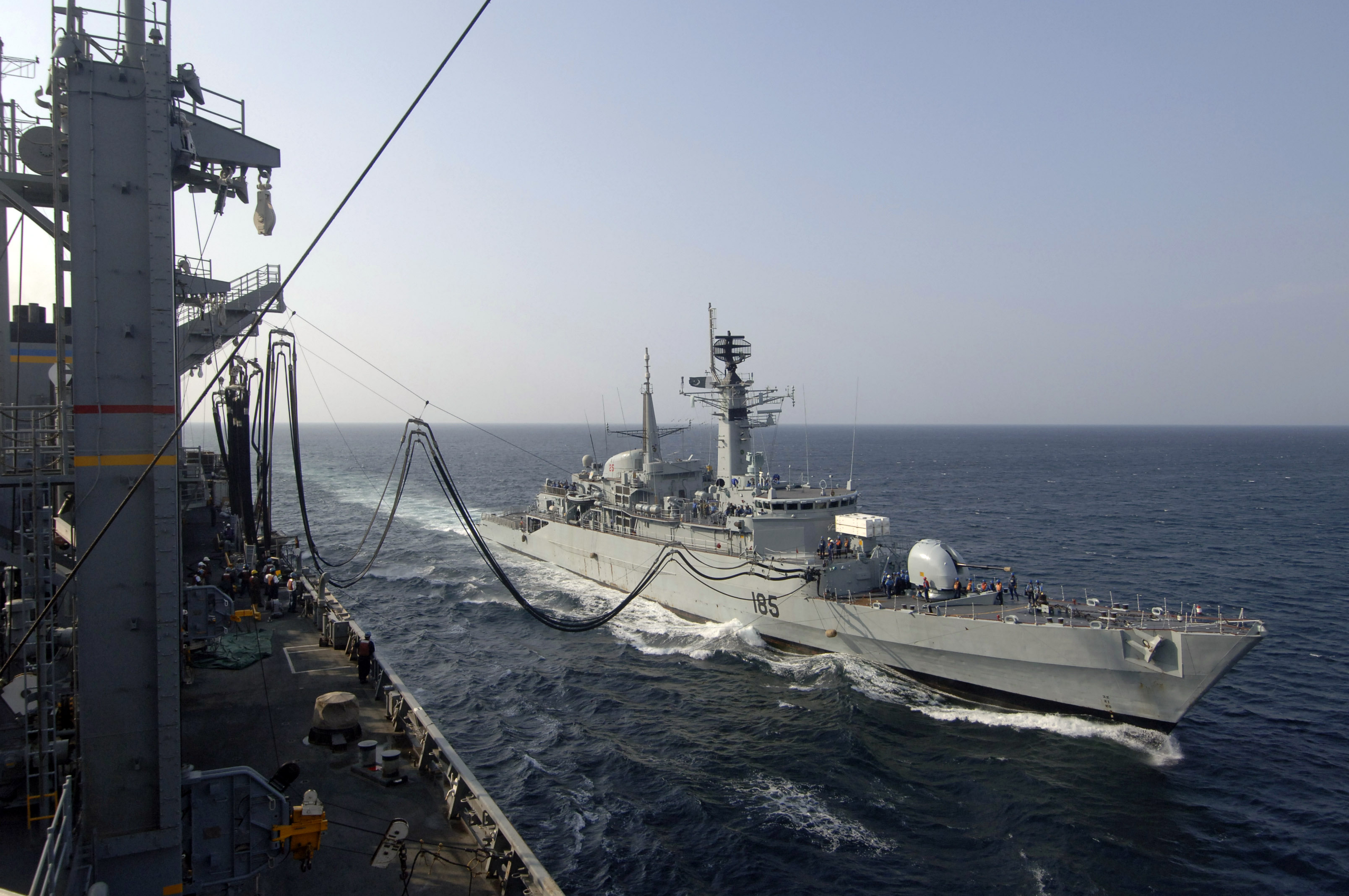
Underway replenishment of PNS Tippu Sultan from USNS Supply.

In the United States Navy, an Oiler is a Combat Logistics ship that replenishes other ships with fuel and in some cases food, mail, ammunition and other necessities while at sea, in a process called Underway Replenishment or UNREP. Up through the Second World War Navy oilers used commercial tanker hulls, with the addition of UNREP gear, defensive guns, and military electronic and damage-control equipment; since the 1950s however they have been built from the keel up as specialized naval auxiliaries. They were previously classified as Fleet Oilers in the 20th century; under the current MSC operation their full classification is listed as Fleet Replenishment Oilers. Since the 1960s the classification Transport Oiler (AOT) has applied to tankers which ship petroleum products to depots around the world, but do not engage in UNREP.

The first fleet oilers were identified by the hull designation AO, which is still in use. Large, fast multifunction oilers which also provide ammunition and dry stores are identified as Fast Combat Support Ships (AOE), and mid-size ones Replenishment Oilers (AOR). The AOR designation is no longer in use. All of these oilers provide the combined services of the AO, AE, AFS and AK.

The style "USNS" and prefix "T" identify a ship as being operated by a civilian crew under the Military Sealift Command (known as the Military Sea Transportation Service until 1970).

=== Current classes ===
There are three classes of vessels currently in commissioned service:

- Henry J. Kaiser class, T-AO-187-T-AO-204, in service 1986
- Supply class, T-AOE, in service 1990
- John Lewis class, T-AO-205-T-AO-221, in service 2022

Both the Henry J. Kaiser and Supply classes will be replaced by the John Lewis-class ships.
