= Soviet submarine K-68 =

Soviet Juliett-class cruise-missile submarine

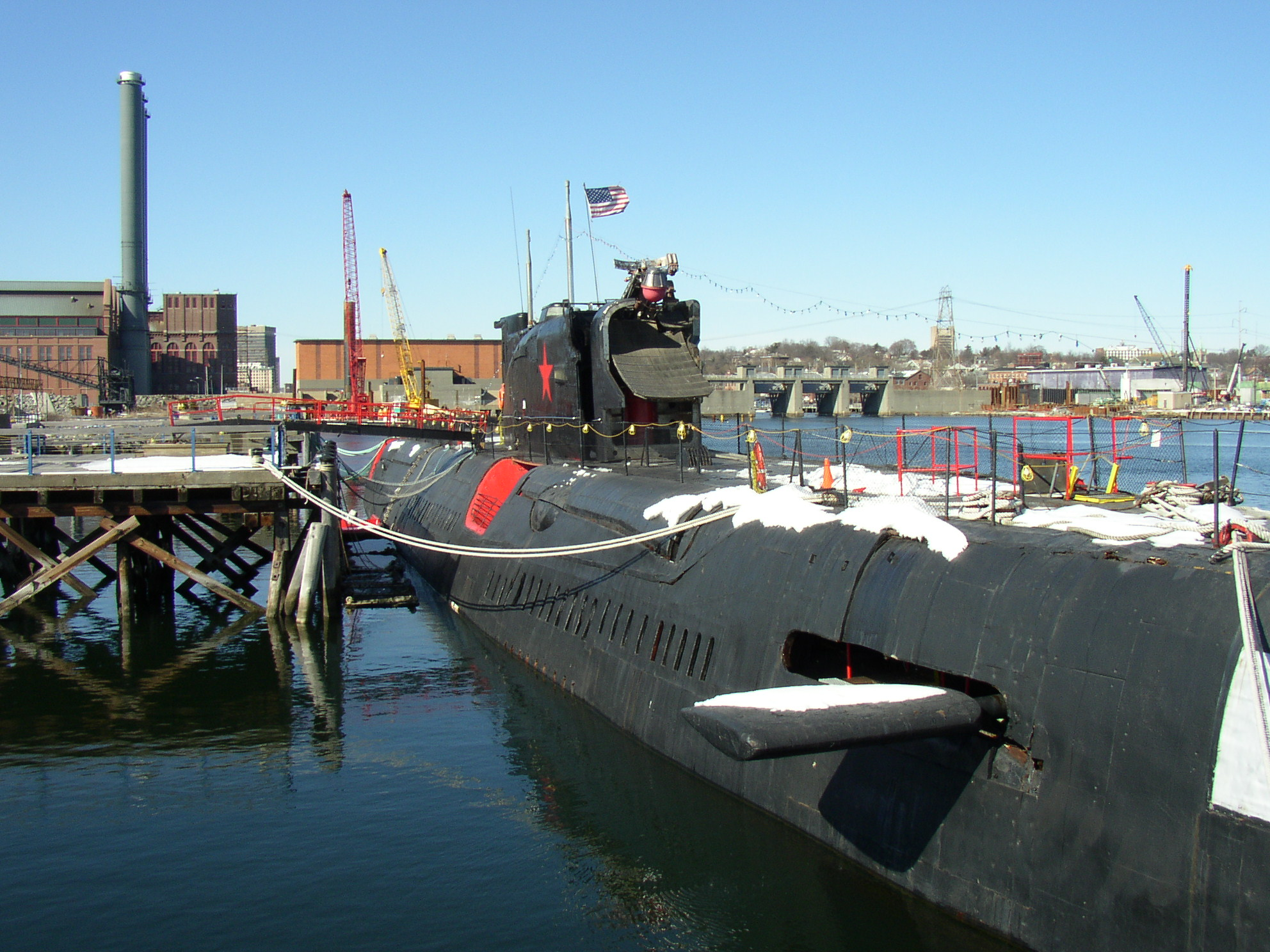
- Sister ship K-77 docked in Providence, Rhode Island

History

Soviet Union
- Name: K-68
- Builder: Krasnoye Sormovo Factory No. 112, Gorky
- Laid down: 25 January 1961
- Launched: 30 April 1963
- Commissioned: 25 December 1965
- Renamed: B-68, 25 July 1977; BS-68, 19 April 1990
- Stricken: 3 July 1992
- Fate: Scrapped after 3 July 1992

General characteristics
- Type: Juliett-class submarine
- Displacement: 3,174 t (3,124 long tons) (surfaced); 3,750 t (3,690 long tons) (submerged)
- Length: 85.9 m (281 ft 10 in)
- Beam: 9.7 m (31 ft 10 in)
- Draft: 3.29 m (10 ft 10 in)
- Propulsion: 2 × propeller shafts; 2 × diesel engines (4,000 PS (2,900 kW)); 2 × electric motors (3,000 PS (2,200 kW)); 2 × electric motors (200 PS (150 kW))
- Speed: 16 knots (30 km/h; 18 mph) (surfaced); 18 knots (33 km/h; 21 mph) (submerged)
- Range: 18,000 nmi (33,000 km; 21,000 mi) at 7 knots (13 km/h; 8.1 mph) (snorkeling); 27.8 nmi (51.5 km; 32.0 mi) at 18 knots (33 km/h; 21 mph) (submerged)
- Test depth: 240 m (790 ft)
- Complement: 78
- Sensors & processing systems: Artika-M (MG-200) and Herkules (MG-15) sonars; Feniks-M (MG-10) and MG-13 hydrophones; Albatros (RLK-50) search radar; Argument missile guidance radar
- Electronic warfare & decoys: Nakat-M ESM
- Armament: 2 × twin SS-N-3 Shaddock (P-5 or P-6) cruise missiles; 6 × 533 mm (21 in) bow torpedo tubes; 4 × 406 mm (16 in) stern torpedo tubes

K-68 was a "Project 651" (NATO reporting name: Juliett-class) diesel–electric submarine built for the Soviet Navy during the 1960s. Commissioned in 1965, the boat was armed with long-range cruise missiles to carry out its mission of destroying American aircraft carriers and bases. The missiles could be fitted with either conventional or nuclear warheads. While much of the submarine's activities during the Cold War are unknown, she did make at least one patrol in the Mediterranean Sea before serving as the test bed for an auxiliary nuclear reactor from 1976 to 1991. K-68 was decommissioned in 1992 and subsequently scrapped.

== Background and description ==
In the late 1950s, the Soviet Navy was tasked to neutralize American bases and aircraft carriers and decided that submarines armed with cruise missiles were its best method to accomplishing this. The number of expensive nuclear-powered (Echo-class submarines) that it could afford and build in a timely manner was insufficient to meet its requirements, so it decided to build the Juliett class as it was significantly cheaper and faster to build.

The Juliett-class boats are a double-hulled design that displaces 3,174 metric tons (3,124 long tons) on the surface and 3,750 tonnes (3,690 long tons) submerged. Unlike the later submarines of the class, K-68's hull was not covered with anechoic tiles. The boats have an overall length of 85.9 meters (281 ft 10 in), a beam of 9.7 meters (31 ft 10 in) and a draft of 6.29 meters (20 ft 8 in). The Julietts have a test depth of 240 meters (790 ft) and a design depth of 300 meters (980 ft). The prominent blast deflectors cut out of the outer hull behind the missile launchers make the submarines very noisy at high speed. Their crew numbered 78 men.

=== Propulsion and performance ===
The Juliett class is powered by a diesel-electric system that consists of two 4,000-metric-horsepower (2,900 kW) 1D43 diesel engines and a pair of 3,000-metric-horsepower (2,200 kW) MG-141 electric motors for cruising on the surface. Two additional 200-metric-horsepower (150 kW) electric motors are intended for slow speeds underwater and are powered by four banks of lead-acid battery cells that are recharged by a 1,000-metric-horsepower (740 kW) 1DL42 diesel generator. The boats are fitted with a retractable snorkel to allow the diesel engines to operate while underwater.

On the surface, the submarines have a maximum speed of 16 knots (30 km/h; 18 mph). Using their diesel-electric system while snorkeling gives the Julietts a range of 18,000 nautical miles (33,000 km; 21,000 mi) at 7 knots (13 km/h; 8.1 mph). Using just the electric motors underwater, they have a maximum range of 810 nmi (1,500 km; 930 mi) at 2.74 knots (5.07 km/h; 3.15 mph). Their best submerged speed on electric motors is 18 knots (33 km/h; 21 mph), although it reduces their range to 27.8 nmi (51.5 km; 32.0 mi). They were designed to carry enough supplies for 90 days of operation.

=== Armament ===
To carry out the Julietts' mission of destroying American carrier battle groups and bases, they were fitted with two pairs of missile launchers, one each fore and aft of the sail. The launchers were used by the surface-launched SS-N-3 Shaddock family of long-range, turbojet-powered, cruise missiles that could be equipped with either a high-explosive or nuclear warhead.

The more traditional armament of the Julietts consisted of six 533-millimeter (21 in) torpedo tubes mounted in the bow and four 406-millimeter (16 in) torpedo tubes in the stern. Due to space limitations, no reloads were provided for the bow tubes, but each stern tube had two reloads for a total of twelve.

=== Fire control and sensors ===
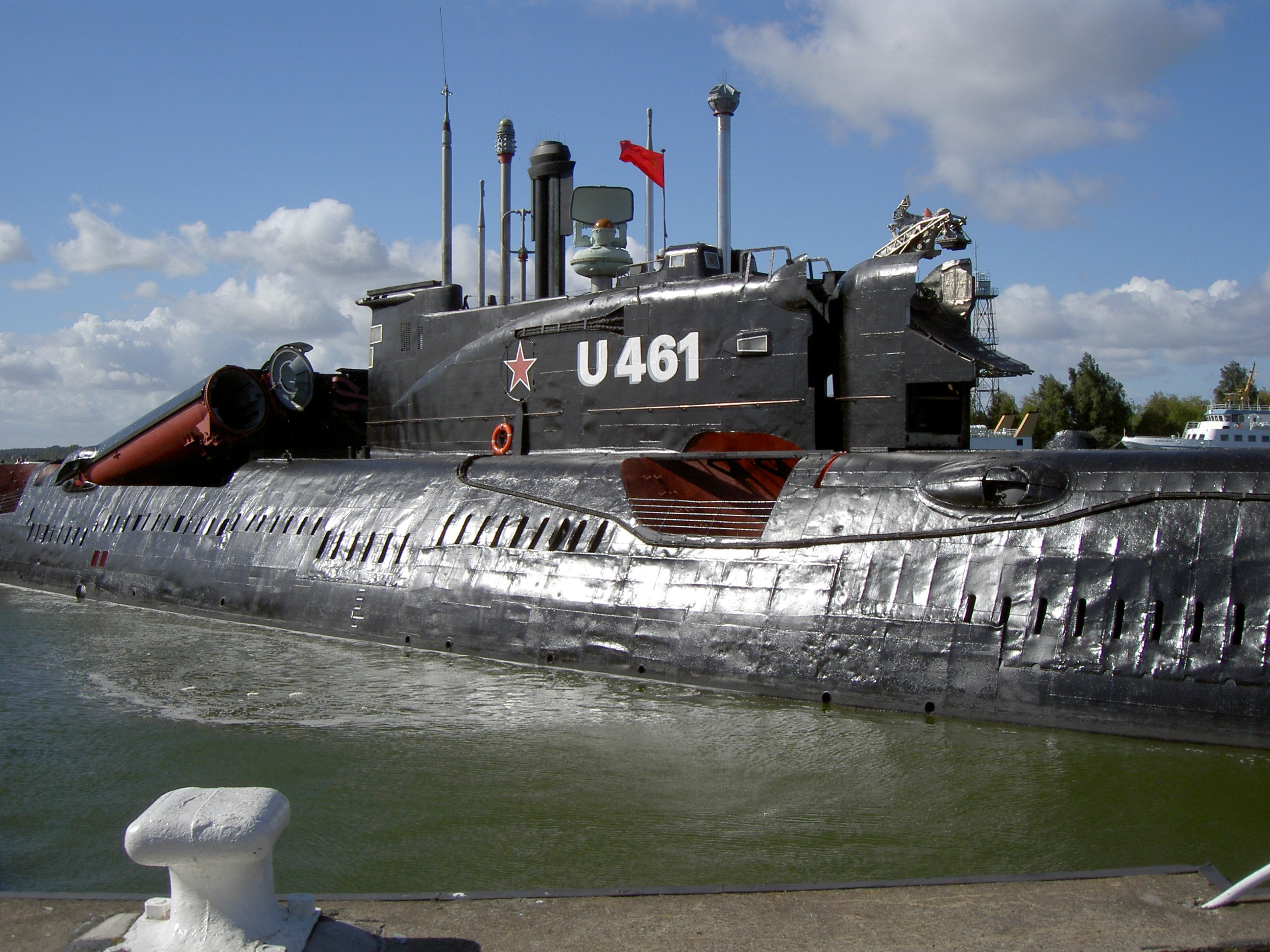
A photo of sister ship K-24 in Peenemünde, Germany. The Argument (Front Door) radar is at the front of the sail, with the Front Piece datalink above it. Aft of the sail, the rear missile mount is visible, elevated to its maximum of 15°.

The submarines relied upon aircraft for their long-range anti-ship targeting which they received via the Uspekh-U datalink system. Their own Argument missile-guidance radar controlled the missiles until they were out of range via a datalink. The missiles' onboard radar would detect the targets and transmit an image back to the submarine via video datalink so the crew could select which target to attack, after which the missile relied upon its own radar for terminal guidance. The Argument radar has a massive antenna that was stowed at the front of the sail and rotated 180° for use. The datalink antenna was mounted on top of the missile-guidance antenna.

The boats are fitted with Artika-M (MG-200) and Herkules (MG-15) sonars, Feniks-M (MG-10) and MG-13 hydrophones and an Albatros (RLK-50) search radar. They are also equipped with a Nakat-M Electronic warfare support measures system.

== Construction and career ==
K-68 was laid down at the Krasnoye Sormovo Factory No. 112 shipyard in Gorky on 25 January 1962. She was launched on 6 February 1964 and commissioned on 22 January 1965 into the 35th Submarine Division of the Northern Fleet. The details of K-68's career remain largely unknown, although the boat made a nine-month-long patrol in the Mediterranean Sea in 1974–1975. On 25 September 1976 K-68 began a lengthy conversion at Gorky that lasted until December 1985 which installed a prototype 600 kW (800 hp) VAU-6 auxiliary nuclear reactor. Designed by the Lazurit Central Design Bureau under the designation of Project 651E, the installation was intended to extend the submarine's underwater endurance. While being modified K-68 (the K standing for (Russian: крейсерская, romanized: kreyserskaya, lit. 'cruiser') was redesignated B-68 (the B standing for Russian: большая, romanized: bolshaya, lit. 'large') in 1977. B-68 was assigned to the Northern Fleet's 7th Division of Submarines for sea trials that lasted until 1991. B-68 was redesignated as BS-68 on 19 April 1990. Although there were difficulties early in the test program, it was ultimately successful, but the collapse of the Soviet Union in 1991 halted further work. The submarine was decommissioned and transferred to the 346th Submarine Brigade on 3 July 1992 for disposal and subsequently scrapped.

== Bibliography ==
- Friedman, Norman (1995). "Soviet Union 1947–1991: Russian Federation and Successor States 1991–". In Chumbley, Stephen (ed.). Conway's All the World's Fighting Ships 1947–1995. Annapolis, Maryland: Naval Institute Press. pp. 337–426. ISBN 1-55750-132-7.
- Hampshire, Edward (2018). Soviet Cruise Missile Submarines of the Cold War. London: Osprey Publishing. ISBN 978-1-47282-499-8.
- Pavlov, A. S. (1997). Warships of the USSR and Russia 1945–1995. Annapolis, Maryland: Naval Institute Press. ISBN 1-55750-671-X.
- Polmar, Norman & Moore, Kenneth J. (2004). Cold War Submarines: The Design and Construction of U.S. and Soviet Submarines. Washington, D. C.: Potomac Books. ISBN 978-1-57488-594-1.
- Polmar, Norman & Noot, Jurrien (1991). Submarines of the Russian and Soviet Navies, 1718–1990. Annapolis, Maryland: Naval Institute Press. ISBN 0-87021-570-1.
- Vilches Alarcón, Alejandro A. (2022). From Juliettes to Yasens: Development and Operational History of Soviet Cruise-Missile Submarines. Europe @ War (22). Warwick, UK: Helion & Co. ISBN 978-1-915070-68-5.
