= Soviet submarine K-85 =

Soviet Juliett-class cruise-missile submarine

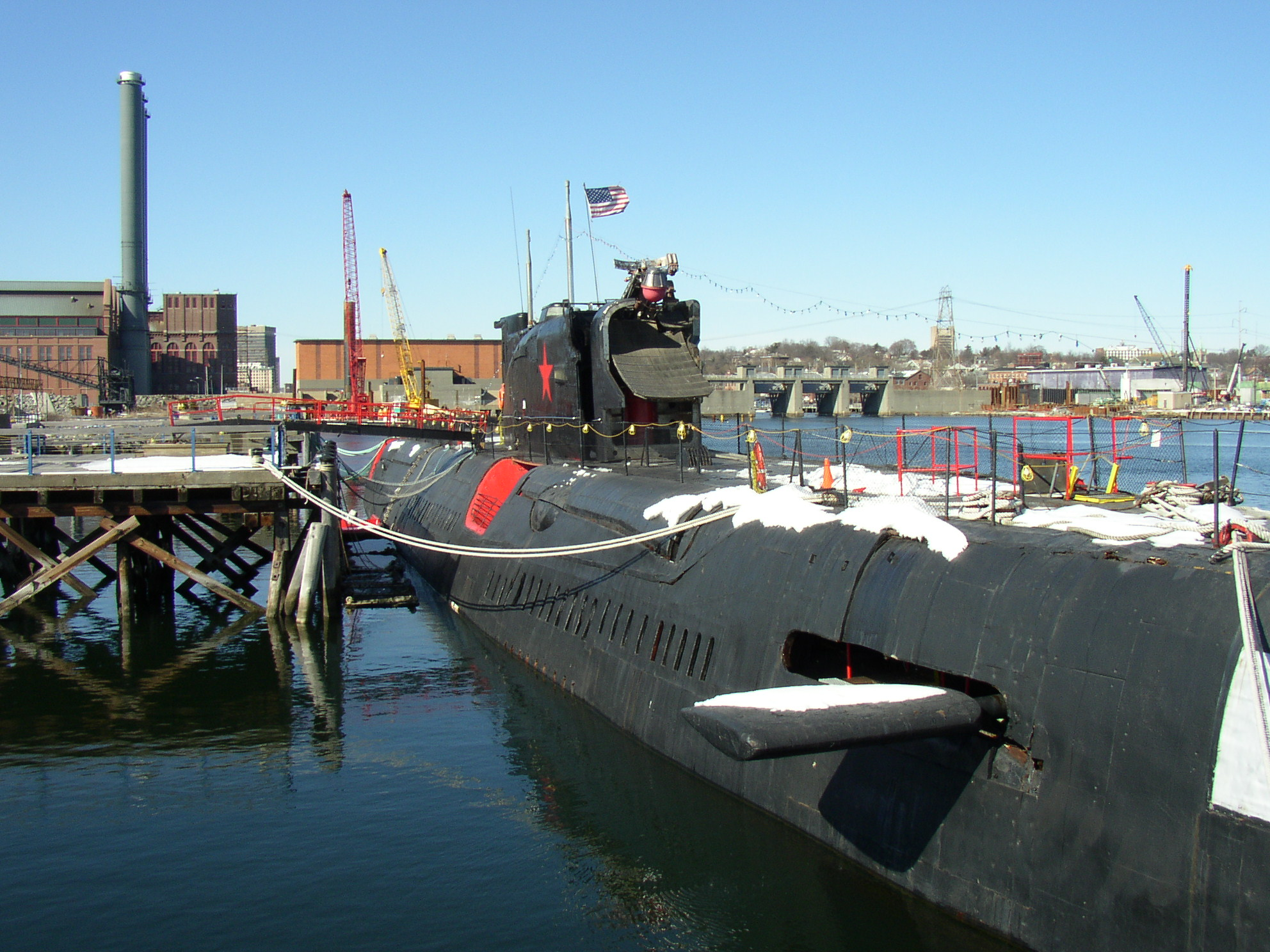
- Sister ship K-77 docked in Providence, Rhode Island

History

Soviet Union
- Name: K-85
- Builder: Shipyard 189 named after Grigoriy Ordzhonikidze, Leningrad
- Laid down: 25 October 1961
- Launched: 31 January 1964
- Commissioned: 22 January 1965
- Decommissioned: 30 June 1993
- Renamed: B-124, 25 July 1977
- Fate: Scrapped, 1998–1999

General characteristics
- Type: Juliett-class submarine
- Displacement: 3,174 t (3,124 long tons) (surfaced); 3,750 t (3,690 long tons) (submerged)
- Length: 85.9 m (281 ft 10 in)
- Beam: 9.7 m (31 ft 10 in)
- Draft: 6.29 m (20 ft 8 in)
- Propulsion: 2 × propeller shafts; 2 × diesel engines (4,000 PS (2,900 kW)); 2 × electric motors (3,000 PS (2,200 kW)); 2 × electric motors (200 PS (150 kW))
- Speed: 16 knots (30 km/h; 18 mph) (surfaced); 18 knots (33 km/h; 21 mph) (submerged)
- Range: 18,000 nmi (33,000 km; 21,000 mi) at 7 knots (13 km/h; 8.1 mph) (snorkeling); 27.8 nmi (51.5 km; 32.0 mi) at 18 knots (33 km/h; 21 mph) (submerged)
- Test depth: 240 m (790 ft)
- Complement: 78
- Sensors & processing systems: Artika-M (MG-200) and Herkules (MG-15) sonars; Feniks-M (MG-10) and MG-13 hydrophones; Albatros (RLK-50) search radar; Argument missile guidance radar
- Electronic warfare & decoys: Nakat-M ESM
- Armament: 2 × twin SS-N-3 Shaddock (P-5 or P-6) cruise missiles; 6 × 533 mm (21 in) bow torpedo tubes; 4 × 406 mm (16 in) stern torpedo tubes

K-85 was a "Project 651" (NATO reporting name: Juliett-class) diesel-electric submarine built for the Soviet Navy during the 1960s. Commissioned in 1965, the boat was armed with long-range cruise missiles to carry out its mission of destroying American aircraft carriers and bases. The missiles could be fitted with either conventional or nuclear warheads. While much of the submarine's activities during the Cold War are unknown, she did make at least two patrols in the Mediterranean Sea while assigned to the Northern Fleet. The submarine was renamed B-124 in 1977 and was transferred to the Baltic Fleet four years later. B-124 was decommissioned in 1993 and subsequently scrapped.

== Background and description ==
In the late 1950s, the Soviet Navy was tasked to neutralize American bases and aircraft carriers and decided that submarines armed with cruise missiles were the best method to accomplish this. The number of expensive nuclear-powered Echo-class submarines that it could afford and build in a timely manner was insufficient to meet its requirements, so it decided to build the Juliett class as it was significantly cheaper and faster to build.

The Juliett-class boats are a double-hulled design that displaces 3,174 metric tons (3,124 long tons) on the surface and 3,750 tonnes (3,690 long tons) submerged. K-68's hull was built from non-magnetic steel and was not covered with anechoic tiles. The boats have an overall length of 85.9 meters (281 ft 10 in), a beam of 9.7 meters (31 ft 10 in), and a draft of 6.29 meters (20 ft 8 in). The Julietts have a test depth of 240 meters (790 ft) and a design depth of 300 meters (980 ft). The prominent blast deflectors cut out of the outer hull behind the missile launchers make the submarines very noisy at high speed. Their crew numbered 78 men.

=== Propulsion and performance ===
The Juliett class is powered by a diesel-electric system that consists of two 4,000-metric-horsepower (2,900 kW) 1D43 diesel engines and a pair of 3,000-metric-horsepower (2,200 kW) MG-141 electric motors for cruising on the surface. Two additional 200-metric-horsepower (150 kW) electric motors are intended for slow speeds underwater and are powered by four banks of lead-acid battery cells that are recharged by a 1,000-metric-horsepower (740 kW) 1DL42 diesel generator. The boats are fitted with a retractable snorkel to allow the diesel engines to operate while underwater.

On the surface, the submarines have a maximum speed of 16 knots (30 km/h; 18 mph). Using their diesel-electric system while snorkeling gives the Julietts a range of 18,000 nautical miles (33,000 km; 21,000 mi) at 7 knots (13 km/h; 8.1 mph). Using just the electric motors underwater, they have a maximum range of 810 nmi (1,500 km; 930 mi) at 2.74 knots (5.07 km/h; 3.15 mph). Their best-submerged speed on electric motors is 18 knots (33 km/h; 21 mph), although it reduces their range to 27.8 nmi (51.5 km; 32.0 mi). They were designed to carry enough supplies for 90 days of operation.

=== Armament ===
To carry out the Julietts' mission of destroying American carrier battle groups and bases, they were fitted with two pairs of missile launchers, one each fore and aft of the sail. The launchers were used by the surface-launched SS-N-3 Shaddock family of long-range, turbojet-powered, cruise missiles that could be equipped with either a high-explosive or nuclear warhead.

The more traditional armament of the Julietts consisted of six 533-millimeter (21 in) torpedo tubes mounted in the bow and four 406-millimeter (16 in) torpedo tubes in the stern. Due to space limitations, no reloads were provided for the bow tubes, but each stern tube had two reloads for a total of twelve.

=== Fire control and sensors ===
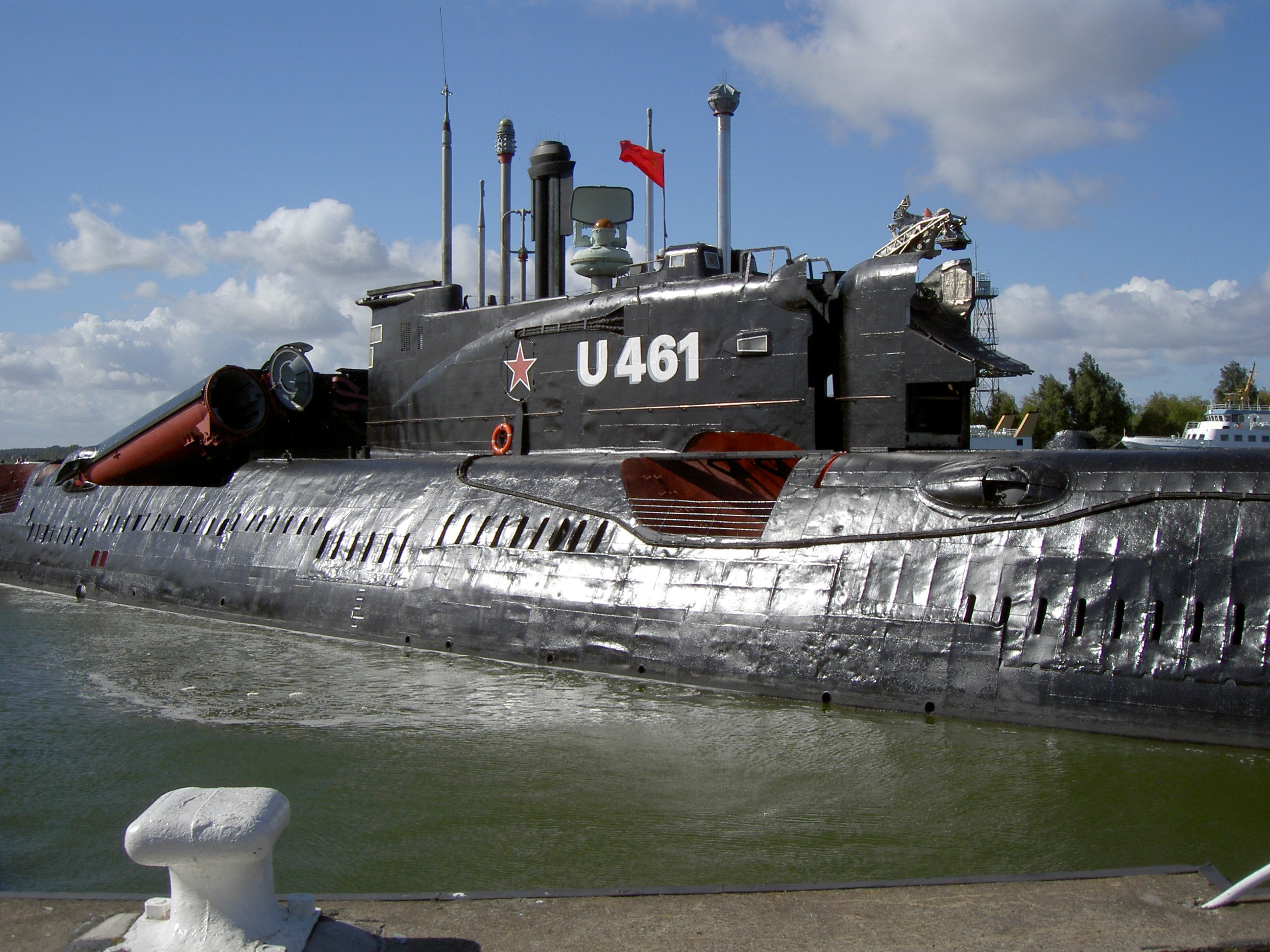
A photo of sister ship K-24 in Peenemünde, Germany. The Argument (Front Door) radar is at the front of the sail, with the Front Piece datalink above it. Aft of the sail, the rear missile mount is visible, elevated to its maximum of 15°.

The submarines relied upon aircraft for their long-range anti-ship targeting which they received via the Uspekh-U data link system. Their own Argument missile-guidance radar controlled the missiles until they were out of range via a data link. The missiles' onboard radar would detect the targets and transmit an image back to the submarine via video data link so the crew could select which target to attack, after which the missile relied upon its own radar for terminal guidance. The Argument radar has a massive antenna that was stowed at the front of the sail and rotated 180° for use. The data link antenna was mounted on top of the missile-guidance antenna.

The boats are fitted with Artika-M (MG-200) and Herkules (MG-15) sonars, Feniks-M (MG-10) and MG-13 hydrophones, and an Albatros (RLK-50) search radar. They are also equipped with a Nakat-M Electronic warfare support measures system.

== Construction and career ==
K-85 was laid down at Shipyard 189 named after Grigoriy Ordzhonikidze in Leningrad on 25 October 1961. She was launched on 31 January 1964 and operated from Tallinn and Liepāja during initial tests in mid-year before being transferred via the White Sea–Baltic Canal to Belomorsk and Severodvinsk for further testing. Entering service on 30 December 1964, the submarine was officially included in the 35th Submarine Division of the Northern Fleet on 22 January 1965. Based at Malaya Lopatkina Bay, the boat made her first patrol in the Mediterranean Sea in 1966. It was plagued with problems with its diesel engines and periscope caused by poor-quality workmanship by the shipyard that got worse over her patrol and forced the navy to abort her mission and return home prematurely for repairs. From January to March 1967 the repairs were carried out at SRZ-35 in Rosta, Murmansk. Between August and November she went on patrol. On 9 September she was ordered to assist K-3 which had suffered a deadly fire while in the Norwegian Sea but was unable to reach K-3 during the day, instead being order to continue the patrol.

In the first half of 1968 the submarine underwent repairs at SRZ-35 to replace her batteries, flooded during the previous cruise. Between August and November, the submarine spent 93 days at sea in the Mediterranean during the 1968 Czechoslovak crisis. While passing through the Strait of Gibraltar it was targeted with practice depth charges by American anti-submarine forces. In 1969 it conducted practice missile firing in the White Sea. The submarines of the 35th Division were relocated to Ara Bay near Vidyayevo in October of that year. K-85 collided with the fishing vessel Yerevan in 1970. Between April 1971 and January 1974 the submarine was under routine repair at SRZ-35, Murmansk. K-85 (the K standing for (Russian: крейсерская, romanized: kreyserskaya, lit. 'cruiser') was redesignated B-124 (the B standing for Russian: большая, romanized: bolshaya, lit. 'large') on 25 July 1977. Between October 1978 and April 1979 she conducted a Mediterranean cruise, replenishing at Tartus.

B-124 conducted a cruise around Scandinavia into the Baltic to join the Baltic Fleet in 1981. The submarine was transferred to the 16th Submarine Division of the 14th Submarine Squadron of the Baltic Fleet on 24 February 1981, based at Liepāja. During 1982 and 1983 the submarine underwent modernization at SRZ-29 in Liepaja, receiving new batteries. The submarine was removed from service and laid up at Liepaja on 1 November 1989, but returned to service on 31 December 1990 as part of the 58th Submarine Brigade of the Baltic Fleet, reorganized from the 16th Submarine Division. The submarine B-124 was decommissioned on 30 June 1993 for disposal. After the Russian withdrawal from Latvia it was left moored half-submerged in Liepaja at Tosmare shipyard in agreement with a Russian military contract. The submarine hull was sold for scrap to the German company VMG and raised by the Lithuanian firm Opron Shipping in 1997 before being scrapped at Tosmare between 1998 and 1999.

== Bibliography ==
- Friedman, Norman (1995). "Soviet Union 1947–1991: Russian Federation and Successor States 1991–". In Chumbley, Stephen (ed.). Conway's All the World's Fighting Ships 1947–1995. Annapolis, Maryland: Naval Institute Press. pp. 337–426. ISBN 1-55750-132-7.
- Hampshire, Edward (2018). Soviet Cruise Missile Submarines of the Cold War. London: Osprey Publishing. ISBN 978-1-47282-499-8.
- Pavlov, A. S. (1997). Warships of the USSR and Russia 1945–1995. Annapolis, Maryland: Naval Institute Press. ISBN 1-55750-671-X.
- Polmar, Norman & Moore, Kenneth J. (2004). Cold War Submarines: The Design and Construction of U.S. and Soviet Submarines. Washington, D. C.: Potomac Books. ISBN 978-1-57488-594-1.
- Polmar, Norman & Noot, Jurrien (1991). Submarines of the Russian and Soviet Navies, 1718–1990. Annapolis, Maryland: Naval Institute Press. ISBN 0-87021-570-1.
- Vilches Alarcón, Alejandro A. (2022). From Juliettes to Yasens: Development and Operational History of Soviet Cruise-Missile Submarines. Europe @ War (22). Warwick, UK: Helion & Co. ISBN 978-1-915070-68-5.
