= Soviet submarine K-77 =

Soviet Juliett-class cruise-missile submarine

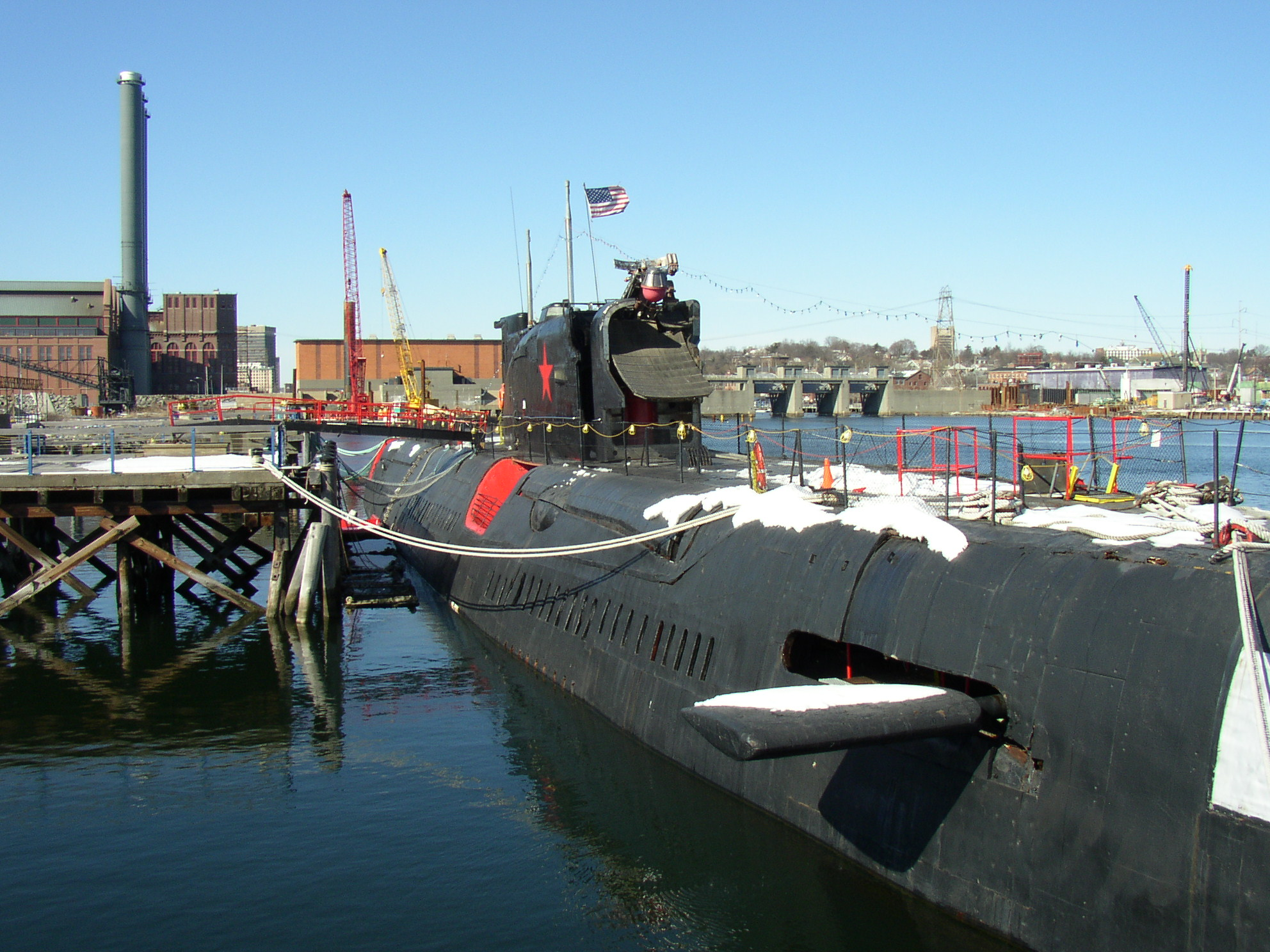
- K-77 docked in Providence, Rhode Island

History

Soviet Union
- Name: K-77
- Ordered: 1950s
- Builder: Krasnoye Sormovo Factory No. 112, Gorky
- Laid down: 31 January 1963
- Launched: 11 March 1965
- Commissioned: 31 October 1965
- Renamed: 1977, B-77
- Stricken: 1994
- Fate: Sold for scrap, August 2009

General characteristics
- Type: Juliett-class submarine
- Displacement: 3,174 t (3,124 long tons) (surfaced); 3,750 t (3,690 long tons) (submerged)
- Length: 85.9 m (281 ft 10 in)
- Beam: 9.7 m (31 ft 10 in)
- Draft: 3.29 m (10 ft 10 in)
- Propulsion: 2 × propeller shafts; 2 × diesel engines (4,000 PS (2,900 kW)); 2 × electric motors (3,000 PS (2,200 kW)); 2 × electric motors (200 PS (150 kW))
- Speed: 16 knots (30 km/h; 18 mph) (surfaced); 18 knots (33 km/h; 21 mph) (submerged)
- Range: 18,000 nmi (33,000 km; 21,000 mi) at 7 knots (13 km/h; 8.1 mph) (snorkeling); 27.8 nmi (51.5 km; 32.0 mi) at 18 knots (33 km/h; 21 mph) (submerged)
- Test depth: 240 m (790 ft)
- Complement: 78
- Sensors & processing systems: Artika-M (MG-200) and Herkules (MG-15) sonars; Feniks-M (MG-10) and MG-13 hydrophones; Albatros (RLK-50) search radar; Argument missile guidance radar
- Electronic warfare & decoys: Nakat-M ESM
- Armament: 2 × twin SS-N-3 Shaddock (P-5 or P-6) cruise missiles; 6 × 533 mm (21 in) bow torpedo tubes; 4 × 406 mm (16 in) stern torpedo tubes

K-77 was a "Project 651" (NATO reporting name: Juliett-class) diesel–electric submarine built for the Soviet Navy during the 1960s. Commissioned in 1965, the boat was armed with long-range cruise missiles to carry out its mission of destroying American aircraft carriers and bases. The missiles could be fitted with either conventional or nuclear warheads.

K-77 was built later in the Juliett class, so her hull was conventional steel and her battery was of the conventional lead-acid type, rather than the austenitic steel and silver-zinc batteries used in the first Julietts. K-77 was also used as the set for the motion picture K-19: The Widowmaker, starring Harrison Ford and Liam Neeson.

The boat flooded and sank during a storm in 2007. She was refloated a year later and subsequently scrapped.

== Background and description ==
In the late 1950s, the Soviet Navy was tasked to neutralize American bases and aircraft carriers. It began construction of a large number of expensive nuclear-powered (Echo-class submarines) to accomplish this, but could not build enough nuclear reactors to equip them in a timely manner. Even though the Juliett class was inferior to the Echos, it was ordered into production because it did not require resources needed for the nuclear boats.

The Juliett-class boats are a double-hulled design that displaces 3,174 metric tons (3,124 long tons) on the surface and 3,750 tonnes (3,690 long tons) submerged. The boats have an overall length of 85.9 meters (281 ft 10 in), a beam of 9.7 meters (31 ft 10 in) and a draft of 6.29 meters (20 ft 8 in). The Julietts have a test depth of 240 meters (790 ft) and a design depth of 300 meters (980 ft). The prominent blast deflectors cut out of the outer hull behind the missile launchers make the submarines very noisy at high speed. Their crew numbered 78 men.

=== Propulsion and performance ===
The Juliett class is powered by a diesel-electric system that consists of two 4,000-metric-horsepower (2,900 kW) 1D43 diesel engines and a pair of 3,000 PS (2,200 kW) MG-141 electric motors for cruising on the surface. Two additional 200 PS (150 kW) electric motors are intended for slow speeds underwater and are powered by four banks of lead-acid battery cells that are recharged by a 1,000 PS (740 kW) 1DL42 diesel generator. The boats are fitted with a retractable snorkel to allow the diesel engines to operate while underwater.

On the surface, the submarines have a maximum speed of 16 knots (30 km/h; 18 mph). Using their diesel-electric system while snorkeling gives the Julietts a range of 18,000 nautical miles (33,000 km; 21,000 mi) at 7 knots (13 km/h; 8.1 mph). Using just the electric motors underwater, they have a maximum range of 810 nmi (1,500 km; 930 mi) at 2.74 knots (5.07 km/h; 3.15 mph). Their best submerged speed on electric motors is 18 knots (33 km/h; 21 mph), although it reduces their range to 27.8 nmi (51.5 km; 32.0 mi). They could carry enough supplies for 90 days of operation.

=== Armament ===
To carry out the Julietts' mission of destroying American carrier battle groups and bases, they were fitted with two pairs of missile launchers, one each fore and aft of the sail. The launchers were used by the surface-launched SS-N-3 Shaddock family of long-range, turbojet-powered, cruise missiles. The P-5D version was codenamed SS-N-3c by NATO and was a dedicated land-attack missile that could be equipped with either a high-explosive or nuclear warhead; it was withdrawn from service in 1965–1966. The P-6 (SS-N-3a) variant was a radar-guided anti-ship missile that could also be fitted with high-explosive and nuclear warheads.

The more traditional armament of the Julietts consisted of six 533-millimeter (21 in) torpedo tubes mounted in the bow and four 406-millimeter (16 in) torpedo tubes in the stern. Due to space limitations, no reloads were provided for the bow tubes, but each stern tube had two reloads for a total of twelve.

=== Fire control and sensors ===
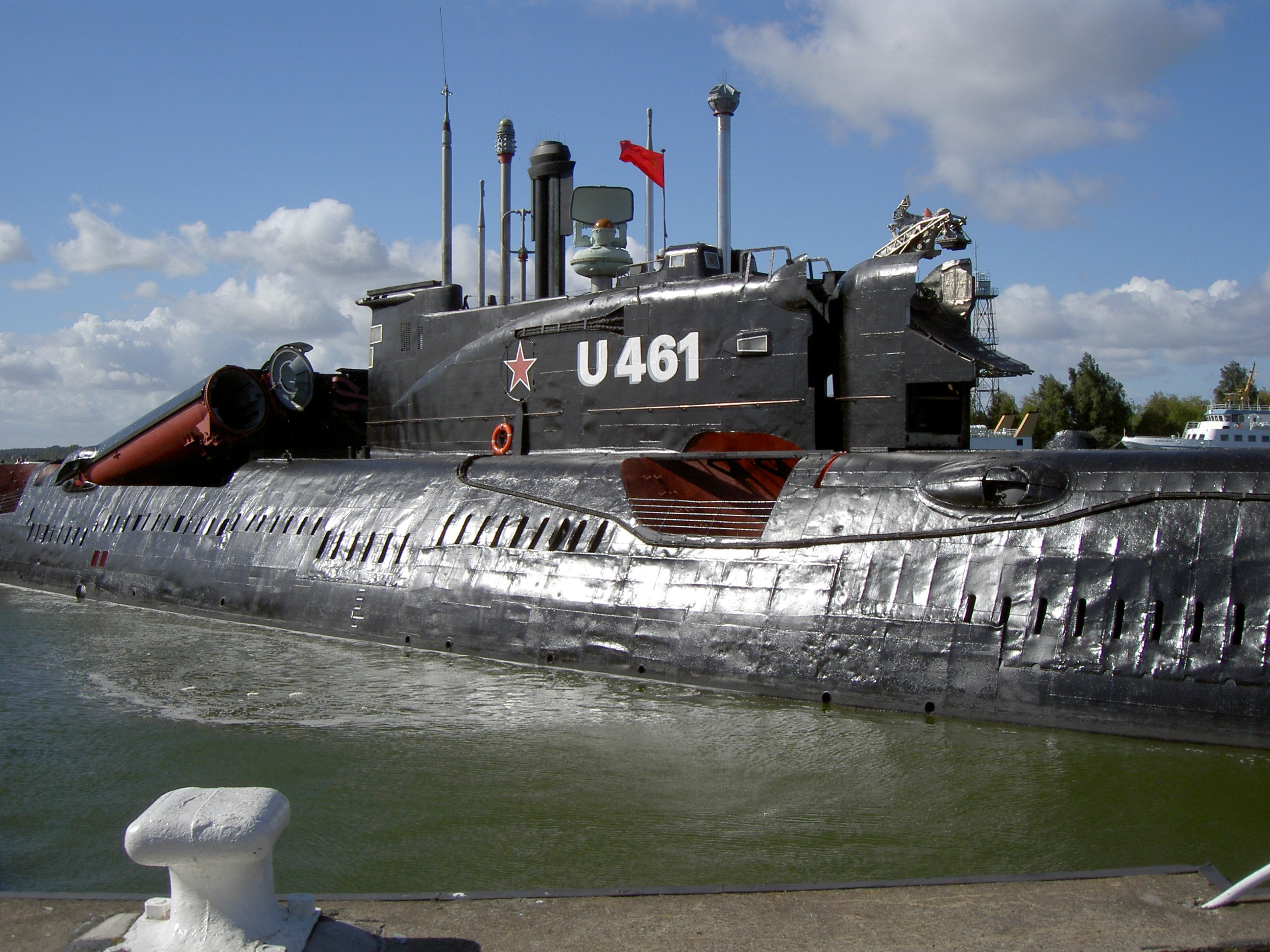
A photo of sister ship K-24 in Peenemünde, Germany. The Argument (Front Door) radar is at the front of the sail, with the Front Piece datalink above it. Aft of the sail, the rear missile mount is visible, elevated to its maximum of 15°.

The submarines relied upon aircraft for their long-range anti-ship targeting which they received via the Uspekh-U datalink system. Their own Argument missile-guidance radar (NATO reporting name: Front Door) controlled the P-6 missiles until they were out of range via a datalink codenamed Front Piece. The missiles' onboard radar would detect the targets and transmit an image back to the submarine via video datalink so the crew could select which target to attack, after which the missile relied upon its own radar for terminal guidance. The Argument radar has a massive antenna that was stowed at the front of the sail and rotated 180° for use. The Front Piece antenna was mounted on top of the Argument antenna.

The boats are fitted with Artika-M (MG-200) and Herkules (MG-15) sonars, Feniks-M (MG-10) and MG-13 hydrophones and an Albatros RLK-50 search radar (NATO reporting name: Snoop Tray). They are also equipped with a Nakat-M Electronic warfare support measures system.

== Construction and career ==
K-77 was laid down at the Krasnoye Sormovo Factory No. 112 shipyard in Gorky on 31 January 1963. She was launched on 11 March 1965 and commissioned on 31 October into the Northern Fleet. The details of K-77's career remain largely unknown although she made at least two patrols in the Mediterranean Sea. During her second deployment there, the boat trailed the United States Navy carriers of the Sixth Fleet between May and November 1974. Two years later K-77 was deployed in the Caribbean Sea near the Puerto Rico. In 1977, K-77 (the K standing for (Russian: крейсерская, romanized: kreyserskaya, lit. 'cruiser') was redesignated Б-77 (the Б standing for Russian: большая, romanized: bolshaya, lit. 'large'). In 1987, K-77 was withdrawn from the blue-water Northern Fleet and transferred to the 16th Submarine Division of the Baltic Fleet. Four years later, they were relegated to the 58th Submarine Brigade to finish out their service lives. K-77 was decommissioned sometime after 1991, and by the end of 1994, all Julietts had been retired.

=== Post-decommissioning ===
==== Finland ====
At the end of the Cold War, Finnish businessman Jari Komulainen, who was married to the daughter of President of Finland Mauno Koivisto, used his influence as Finland's "first son-in-law" to convince the Russian government to lease him a Project 641 "Foxtrot"-class submarine, probably the ex-B-39. Komulainen opened it to the public in Helsinki in the spring of 1993 as a tourist attraction. He then purchased two Juliett-class submarines, one K-77 replacing the Foxtrot in 1994, becoming a bar and restaurant as well as a tourist attraction. Komulainen believed that his restaurant had been K-81, based on a metal plate discovered inside the boat. However, it later transpired that that plate and others bearing different numbers were provided for the crew to display on the submarine's sail during surface running to confuse NATO reconnaissance aircraft. Komulainen also held a beauty pageant "Miss Submarine" at the submarine. Model Anitra Ahtola, who won the competition, later became his third wife.

As a restaurant, K-77 was modestly successful, but was not lucrative enough to satisfy Komulainen. In 1998, he leased his submarine to a Canadian promoter, who towed it to Tampa Bay, Florida. However, the intended mooring location in the harbor was too shallow and the investors were forced to move the proposed tourist attraction to a more remote site. Soon, the promoter filed for bankruptcy, and K-77 reverted to Komulainen. He did not want to repeat the nerve-wracking trans-Atlantic tow, and instead tried at least twice to auction the submarine on eBay — auctions #222791130, ending on 20 December 1999, and #270148521, ending on 7 March 2000. In each case, bidding was to start at US$1 million. No bids were received.

==== Widowmaker ====
The eBay auction, however, caught the attention of Intermedia Film Equities Ltd., who chartered K-77 for US$200,000 and towed her to Halifax, Nova Scotia, in 2000 to become the set for the motion picture K-19: The Widowmaker, starring Harrison Ford and Liam Neeson. The boat was modified with fiberglass to make it resemble a K-19 submarine.

==== Museum ====
The film wrapped up in 2002, when the submarine was purchased by the USS Saratoga Museum Foundation, towed to Collier Point Park in Providence, Rhode Island, and opened to the public in August 2002. K-77 offered public tours and a comprehensive educational program in accordance with New Standards and attuned to the advancement requirements of both Boy Scout and Girl Scout programs.

When the Saratoga Museum Foundation took possession of the submarine, it was described as K-81 in the initial press releases from the Saratoga Museum Foundation. The foundation spent months refurbishing the interior, which included removing several bulkheads, moving large pieces of equipment, and going deep into the bilges. During this process, documents were found which provided incontrovertible proof that the submarine was K-77 and not K-81 as earlier thought. The records confirming this information include maintenance reports, equipment exchanges, radio messages, duty rosters, log entries, and torpedo firing exercises, which all identify the submarine as K-77.

==== Sinking ====
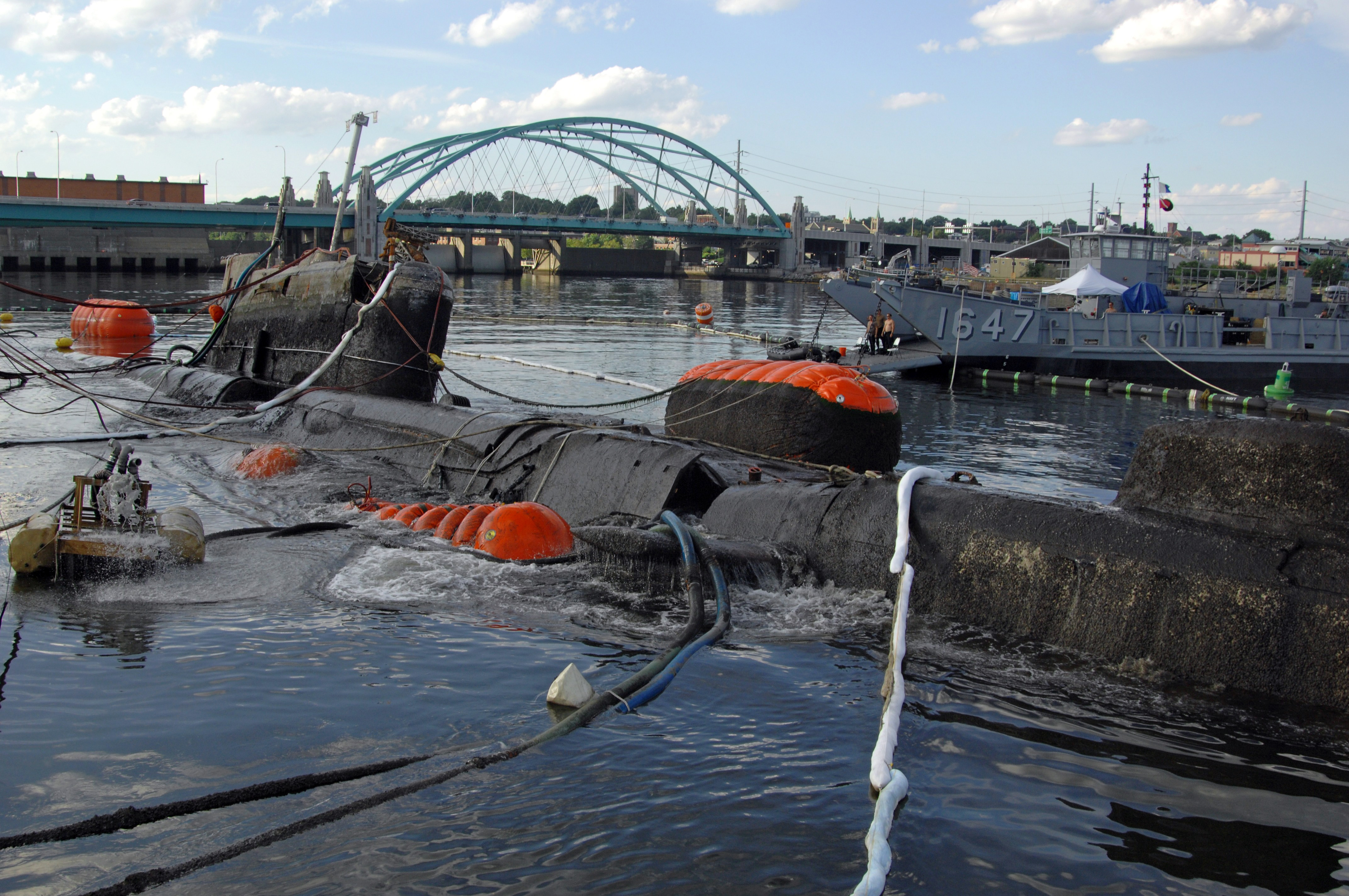
K-77 reappears on the surface, 25 July 2008

The submarine sank on 18 April 2007 after a storm, and plans were made to raise it off the river bottom. The Museum's theory on why the submarine sank is that a modified hatch was not properly watertight. Recovery efforts by U.S. Navy and Army divers began in June 2008 as part of a project to train military divers through real-world, community-based projects.

On 2 June 2008, divers from Mobile Diving and Salvage Unit Two in Norfolk, Virginia arrived and began preparations to raise the submarine. On 25 July 2008, she was brought to the surface by US Navy and Army divers. The work of pumping out water was completed in August 2008. The sub was badly deteriorated and in need of substantial repair.

On 11 August 2009, RI Recycled Metals LLC towed the sub to a facility 1,000 yards (910 m) from the museum site so that it could be scrapped.

A portion of the vessel remained in the river and in 2017, a judge ordered that the remnants be removed.

A section of the submarine was destroyed in a fire in March 2021 while in the process of being dismantled at a Providence scrapyard.

== Bibliography ==
- Friedman, Norman (1995). "Soviet Union 1947–1991: Russian Federation and Successor States 1991–". In Chumbley, Stephen (ed.). Conway's All the World's Fighting Ships 1947–1995. Annapolis, Maryland: Naval Institute Press. pp. 337–426. ISBN 1-55750-132-7.
- Hampshire, Edward (2018). Soviet Cruise Missile Submarines of the Cold War. London: Osprey Publishing. ISBN 978-1-47282-499-8.
- Pavlov, A. S. (1997). Warships of the USSR and Russia 1945–1995. Annapolis, Maryland: Naval Institute Press. ISBN 1-55750-671-X.
- Polmar, Norman & Moore, Kenneth J. (2004). Cold War Submarines: The Design and Construction of U.S. and Soviet Submarines. Washington, D. C.: Potomac Books. ISBN 978-1-57488-594-1.
- Polmar, Norman & Noot, Jurrien (1991). Submarines of the Russian and Soviet Navies, 1718–1990. Annapolis, Maryland: Naval Institute Press. ISBN 0-87021-570-1.
- Vilches Alarcón, Alejandro A. (2022). From Juliettes to Yasens: Development and Operational History of Soviet Cruise-Missile Submarines. Europe @ War (22). Warwick, UK: Helion & Co. ISBN 978-1-915070-68-5.
