= Vladimir Valuyev =

Russian naval officer

Vladimir Prokofyevich Valuyev
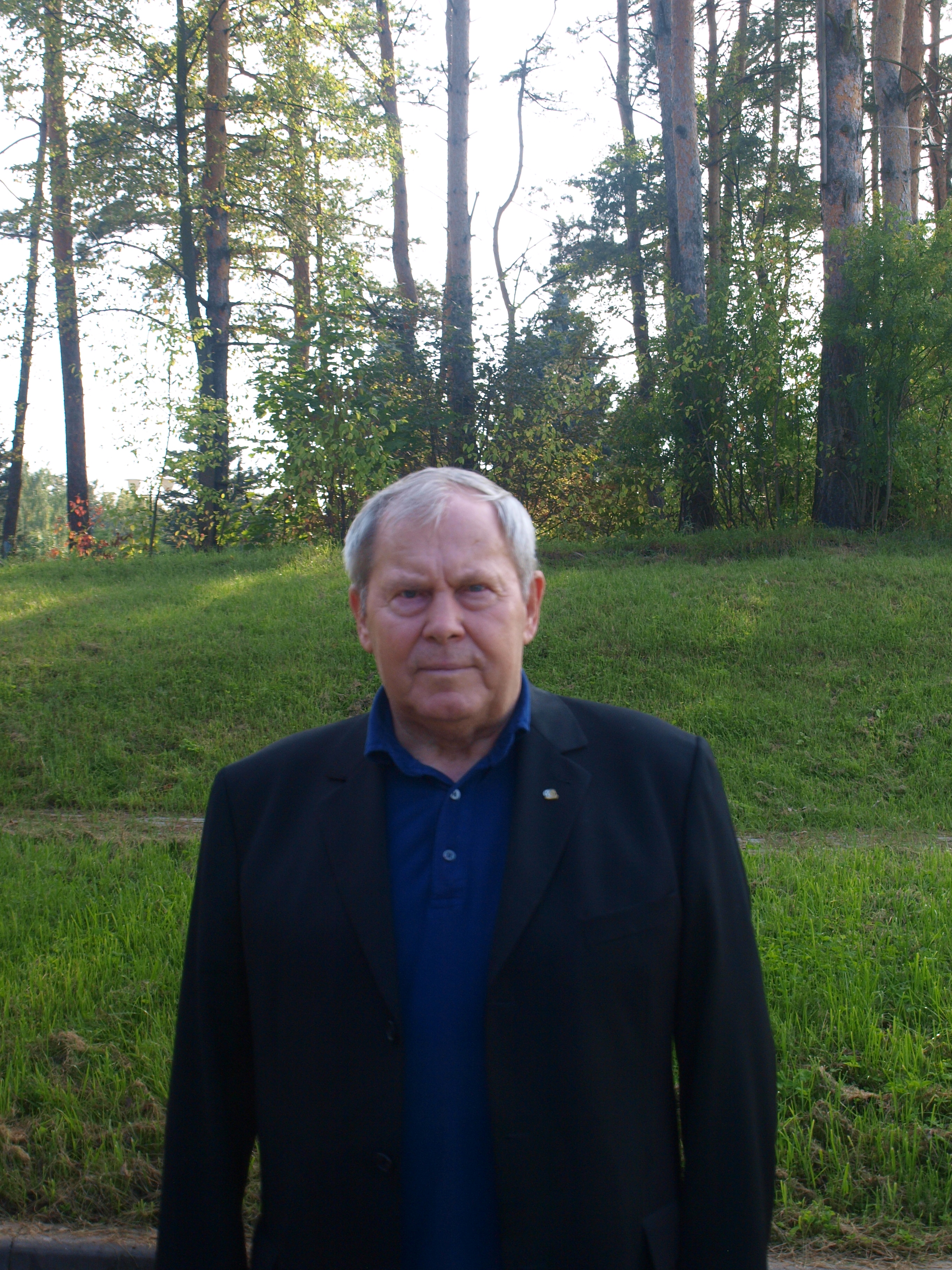
- Born: 16 July 1947 (age 79); Krasnyi Luch, Voroshilovgrad Oblast, Ukrainian SSR, USSR
- Military career
- Allegiance: USSR; Russia
- Branch: Soviet Navy; Russian Navy
- Service years: 1969-2006
- Rank: Admiral
- Commands: Baltic Fleet
- Awards: Order of Courage; Order of Military Merit; Order of Honour; Order "For Service to the Homeland in the Armed Forces of the USSR" Third Class

Vladimir Prokofyevich Valuyev (Russian: Владимир Прокофьевич Валуев; born 16 July 1947) is a retired officer of the Russian Navy. He holds the rank of Admiral, and served as commander of the Baltic Fleet between 2001 and 2006. He began his career in the Soviet Navy, serving on nuclear submarines in the Pacific and Northern Fleets.

== Biography ==
Valuyev was born on 16 July 1947 in Krasnyi Luch, in what was then Voroshilovgrad Oblast, Ukrainian Soviet Socialist Republic, in the Soviet Union. He entered the Soviet Navy, studying at the Higher Naval School of Submarine Navigation in Leningrad from 1964 to 1969. On graduating, he was assigned to the Pacific Fleet, serving on nuclear submarines as the commander of various departments aboard the Whiskey-class S-44, rising to the position of executive officer aboard the Juliett-class K-70 in 1971. He took the Higher Special Officer Classes of the Navy between 1973 and 1974, and on graduation was appointed executive officer of the Northern Fleet's K-478. In 1978, he was appointed commander of the Charlie-class submarine K-325, sailing her from the Northern Fleet to join the Pacific Fleet's 10th Submarine Division at Kamchatka.

Valuyev carried out further studies at the Naval Academy between 1981 and 1983, and on graduating was appointed as deputy commander of one of the Pacific Fleet's submarine divisions. In 1988, he was appointed the division's commander. He studied at the Military Academy of the General Staff between 1991 and 1993, during which time the dissolution of the Soviet Union took place, and Valuyev transitioned from serving the Soviet Navy to the Russian Navy. On graduating, he was assigned to the post of chief of staff and first deputy commander of the Pacific Fleet's 4th Submarine Flotilla. The flotilla was subsequently reorganized as a squadron, and Valuyev, by now a rear-admiral, was appointed its commander. By the time of the squadron's disbandment in 1996, Valuyev had been promoted to vice-admiral, and was appointed Deputy Chief of the Naval General Staff. On 20 November 1996, he was appointed first deputy commander of the Baltic Fleet, serving under the fleet commander, Vladimir Yegorov. Yegorov was elected governor of Kaliningrad Oblast in November 2000, with Valuyev serving as acting commander of the fleet until being confirmed in the position on 11 April 2001. He was promoted to admiral on 11 December 2001. On 30 January 2006, he suffered a myocardial infarction. He stepped down as commander on 6 May 2006, and retired from the navy that month on medical advice.

== Family and personal life ==
Valuyev is married, with two daughters. His hobbies are hunting, chess, and winter swimming. He settled in Kaliningrad, and has been a member of the Security Council of Russia's working group for Kaliningrad Oblast. He is a candidate of military sciences, and president of the Union of Navy Veterans, Chairman of the Moscow Association of Kaliningraders, a board member of the Luhansk and Donetsk Associations in Moscow. He heads the Admiral's Board of Trustees for the building of a church in Saint Petersburg to Fyodor Ushakov.

== Honours and awards ==
Over his career Valuyev has received the Order of Courage, the Order of Military Merit, the Order of Honour, the Order "For Service to the Homeland in the Armed Forces of the USSR", and various other medals.
