= Valuev =

Valuev or Valuyev (Russian: Валу́ев) is a Russian surname. Notable people with the surname include:

- Grigory Valuyev (? - after 1623), Russian voyevoda
- Nikolai Valuev (born 1973), Russian boxer and member of the State Duma
- Pyotr Valuev (1815–1890), Russian statesman and writer
- Vladimir Valuyev (born 1947), Russian naval officer

== See also ==
- Valuev Circular, a secret decree which stopped all publications in Ukrainian language
