= Soviet submarine K-70 =

Soviet Juliett-class cruise-missile submarine

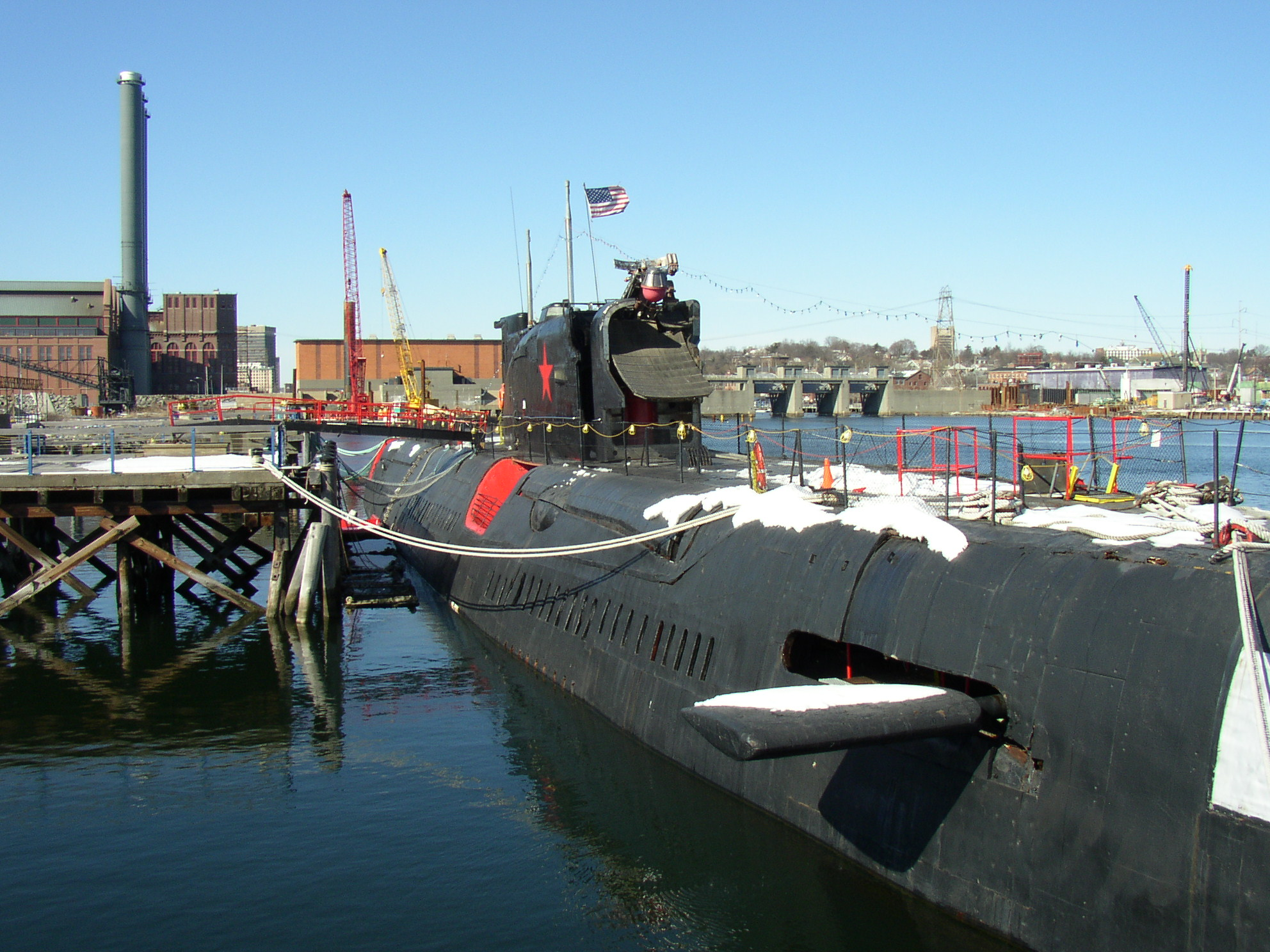
- Sister ship K-77 docked in Providence, Rhode Island

History

Soviet Union
- Name: K-70
- Builder: Krasnoye Sormovo Factory No. 112, Gorky
- Laid down: 25 August 1962
- Launched: 6 February 1964
- Commissioned: 22 January 1965
- Decommissioned: 30 June 1989
- Renamed: B-260 25 July 1977
- Fate: Scrapped

General characteristics
- Type: Juliett-class submarine
- Displacement: 3,174 t (3,124 long tons) (surfaced); 3,750 t (3,690 long tons) (submerged)
- Length: 85.9 m (281 ft 10 in)
- Beam: 9.7 m (31 ft 10 in)
- Draft: 3.29 m (10 ft 10 in)
- Propulsion: 2 × propeller shafts; 2 × diesel engines (4,000 PS (2,900 kW)); 2 × electric motors (3,000 PS (2,200 kW)); 2 × electric motors (200 PS (150 kW))
- Speed: 16 knots (30 km/h; 18 mph) (surfaced); 18 knots (33 km/h; 21 mph) (submerged)
- Range: 18,000 nmi (33,000 km; 21,000 mi) at 7 knots (13 km/h; 8.1 mph) (snorkeling); 27.8 nmi (51.5 km; 32.0 mi) at 18 knots (33 km/h; 21 mph) (submerged)
- Test depth: 240 m (790 ft)
- Complement: 78
- Sensors & processing systems: Artika-M (MG-200) and Herkules (MG-15) sonars; Feniks-M (MG-10) and MG-13 hydrophones; Albatros (RLK-50) search radar; Argument missile guidance radar
- Electronic warfare & decoys: Nakat-M ESM
- Armament: 2 × twin SS-N-3 Shaddock (P-5 or P-6) cruise missiles; 6 × 533 mm (21 in) bow torpedo tubes; 4 × 406 mm (16 in) stern torpedo tubes

K-70 was a "Project 651" (NATO reporting name: Juliett-class) diesel–electric submarine built for the Soviet Navy during the 1960s. Commissioned in 1965, the boat was armed with long-range cruise missiles to carry out its mission of destroying American aircraft carriers and bases. The missiles could be fitted with either conventional or nuclear warheads. K-70 was initially assigned to the Northern Fleet, but was transferred to the Pacific Fleet a few months later. The submarine was decommissioned in 1989 and subsequently scrapped.

== Background and description ==
In the late 1950s, the Soviet Navy was tasked to neutralize American bases and aircraft carriers. It began construction of a large number of expensive nuclear-powered (Echo-class submarines) to accomplish this, but could not build enough nuclear reactors to equip them in a timely manner. Even though the Juliett class was inferior to the Echos, it was ordered into production because it did not require resources needed for the nuclear boats.

The Juliett-class boats are a double-hulled design that displaces 3,174 metric tons (3,124 long tons) on the surface and 3,750 tonnes (3,690 long tons) submerged. Unlike the earliest submarines of the class, K-70's hull was covered with anechoic tiles. The boats have an overall length of 85.9 meters (281 ft 10 in), a beam of 9.7 meters (31 ft 10 in) and a draft of 6.29 meters (20 ft 8 in). The Julietts have a test depth of 240 meters (790 ft) and a design depth of 300 meters (980 ft). The prominent blast deflectors cut out of the outer hull behind the missile launchers make the submarines very noisy at high speed. Their crew numbered 78 men.

=== Propulsion and performance ===
The Juliett class is powered by a diesel-electric system that consists of two 4,000-metric-horsepower (2,900 kW) 1D43 diesel engines and a pair of 3,000 PS (2,200 kW) MG-141 electric motors for cruising on the surface. Two additional 200 PS (150 kW) electric motors are intended for slow speeds underwater and are powered by four banks of lead-acid battery cells that are recharged by a 1,000 PS (740 kW) 1DL42 diesel generator. The boats are fitted with a retractable snorkel to allow the diesel engines to operate while underwater.

On the surface, the submarines have a maximum speed of 16 knots (30 km/h; 18 mph). Using their diesel-electric system while snorkeling gives the Julietts a range of 18,000 nautical miles (33,000 km; 21,000 mi) at 7 knots (13 km/h; 8.1 mph). Using just the electric motors underwater, they have a maximum range of 810 nmi (1,500 km; 930 mi) at 2.74 knots (5.07 km/h; 3.15 mph). Their best submerged speed on electric motors is 18 knots (33 km/h; 21 mph), although it reduces their range to 27.8 nmi (51.5 km; 32.0 mi). They could carry enough supplies for 90 days of operation.

=== Armament ===
To carry out the Julietts' mission of destroying American carrier battle groups and bases, they were fitted with two pairs of missile launchers, one each fore and aft of the sail. The launchers were used by the surface-launched SS-N-3 Shaddock family of long-range, turbojet-powered, cruise missiles. The P-5D version was codenamed SS-N-3c by NATO and was a dedicated land-attack missile that could be equipped with either a high-explosive or nuclear warhead; it was withdrawn from service in 1965–1966. The P-6 (SS-N-3a) variant was a radar-guided anti-ship missile that could also be fitted with high-explosive and nuclear warheads.

The more traditional armament of the Julietts consisted of six 533-millimeter (21 in) torpedo tubes mounted in the bow and four 406-millimeter (16 in) torpedo tubes in the stern. Due to space limitations, no reloads were provided for the bow tubes, but each stern tube had two reloads for a total of twelve.

=== Fire control and sensors ===
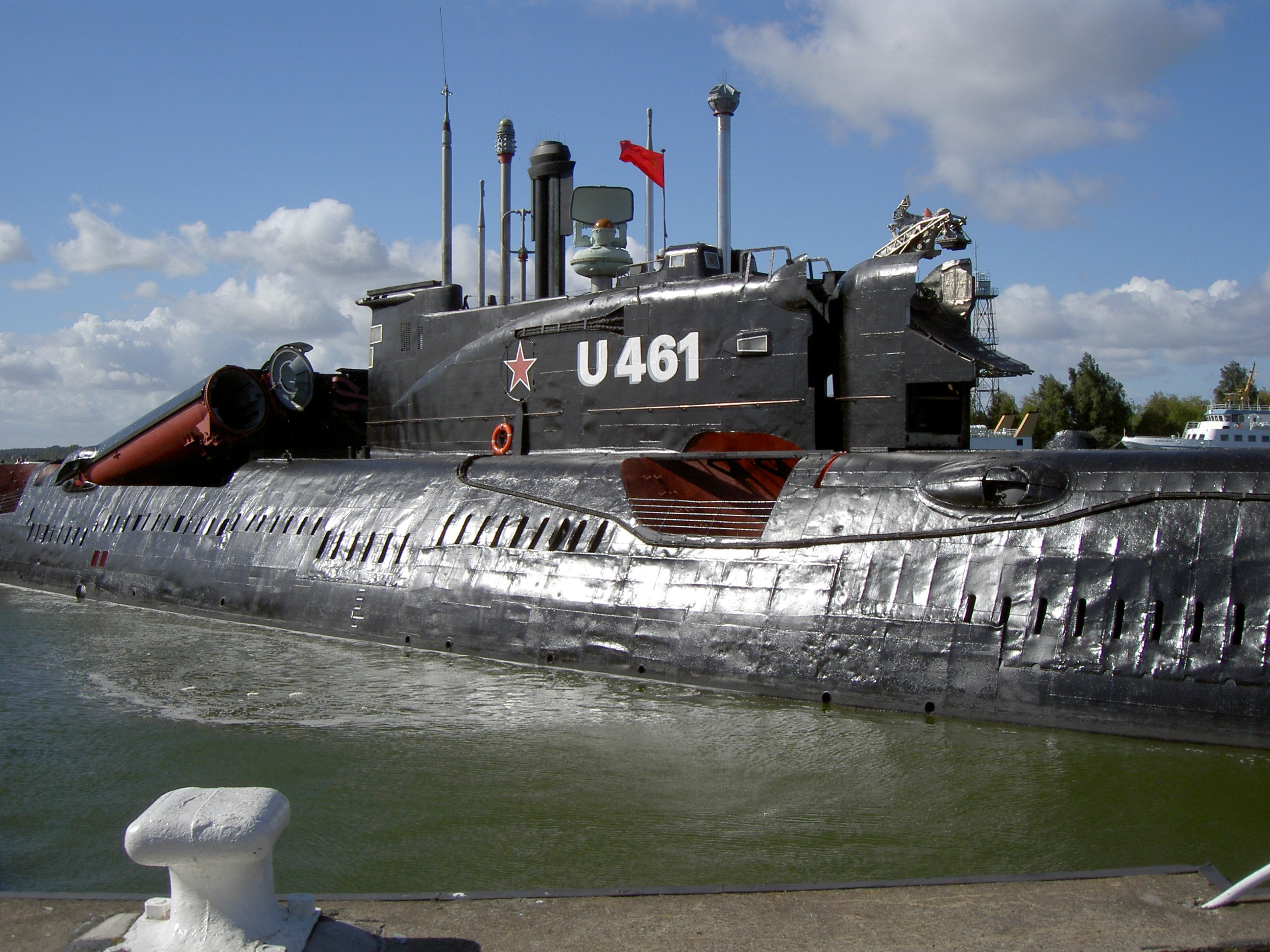
A photo of sister ship K-24 in Peenemünde, Germany. The Argument (Front Door) radar is at the front of the sail, with the Front Piece datalink above it. Aft of the sail, the rear missile mount is visible, elevated to its maximum of 15°.

The submarines relied upon aircraft for their long-range anti-ship targeting which they received via the Uspekh-U datalink system. Their own Argument missile-guidance radar (NATO reporting name: Front Door) controlled the P-6 missiles until they were out of range via a datalink codenamed Front Piece. The missiles' onboard radar would detect the targets and transmit an image back to the submarine via video datalink so the crew could select which target to attack, after which the missile relied upon its own radar for terminal guidance. The Argument radar has a massive antenna that was stowed at the front of the sail and rotated 180° for use. The Front Piece antenna was mounted on top of the Argument antenna.

The boats are fitted with Artika-M (MG-200) and Herkules (MG-15) sonars, Feniks-M (MG-10) and MG-13 hydrophones and a Albatros RLK-50 search radar (NATO reporting name: Snoop Tray). They are also equipped with a Nakat-M Electronic warfare support measures system.

== Construction and career ==
K-70 was laid down at the Krasnoye Sormovo Factory No. 112 shipyard in Gorky on 25 August 1962. She was launched on 6 February 1964 and commissioned on 22 January 1965 into the Northern Fleet, but was transferred to the Pacific Fleet on 15 March. The details of K-70's career remain largely unknown, although the boats deployed there are known to have made patrols in the Indian Ocean. On 25 July 1977, K-70 (the K standing for (Russian: крейсерская, romanized: kreyserskaya, lit. 'cruiser') was redesignated B-70 (the B standing for Russian: большая, romanized: bolshaya, lit. 'large'). The submarine was decommissioned on 30 June 1989 and subsequently scrapped.

== Bibliography ==
- Friedman, Norman (1995). "Soviet Union 1947–1991: Russian Federation and Successor States 1991–". In Chumbley, Stephen (ed.). Conway's All the World's Fighting Ships 1947–1995. Annapolis, Maryland: Naval Institute Press. pp. 337–426. ISBN 1-55750-132-7.
- Hampshire, Edward (2018). Soviet Cruise Missile Submarines of the Cold War. London: Osprey Publishing. ISBN 978-1-47282-499-8.
- Pavlov, A. S. (1997). Warships of the USSR and Russia 1945–1995. Annapolis, Maryland: Naval Institute Press. ISBN 1-55750-671-X.
- Polmar, Norman & Moore, Kenneth J. (2004). Cold War Submarines: The Design and Construction of U.S. and Soviet Submarines. Washington, D. C.: Potomac Books. ISBN 978-1-57488-594-1.
- Polmar, Norman & Noot, Jurrien (1991). Submarines of the Russian and Soviet Navies, 1718–1990. Annapolis, Maryland: Naval Institute Press. ISBN 0-87021-570-1.
- Vilches Alarcón, Alejandro A. (2022). From Juliettes to Yasens: Development and Operational History of Soviet Cruise-Missile Submarines. Europe @ War (22). Warwick, UK: Helion & Co. ISBN 978-1-915070-68-5.
