= Object 100 =

Russian Navy underground military complex

Object 100
- Oбъект 100
- Sevastopol

Site information
- Type: Coastal fortification
- Owner: Ministry of Defence
- Operator: Russian Navy
- Controlled by: Black Sea Fleet
- Condition: Operational

Location
- Location within Crimea
- Location within Crimea
- Coordinates: 44°27′05″N 33°39′09″E

Site history
- Built: 1954
- Built by: Soviet Union

Object 100 (Oбъект 100) is a Russian Navy coastal defense underground complex armed with anti-ship missiles built in 1954 by the Soviet Union to protect Sevastopol and surrounding maritime approaches. It was modernized several times over the years before being abandoned after the dissolution of the Soviet Union. Following the annexation of Crimea by the Russian Federation it was reactivated in 2016, being mostly used for training purposes, though it reportedly was used to launch attacks on Ukrainian ground targets during the Russo-Ukrainian War.

== Overview ==
Built in the mountains of Balaklava, Sevastopol in 1954, it was designed to protect the nearby waters from NATO naval assaults. Codenamed Project 100 underground complex consists of two identical anti-ship cruise missile launch sites located 6.0 km (3.7 mi) from each other and buried under thick layers of concrete to provide protection against a nuclear attack. It also features command posts, missile storage depots, workshops to prepare and refuel the missiles, diesel generators, filtration and ventilation units, and supply depots with fuel, food, and water.

It was initially armed with Sopka anti-ship missiles, but over the years it was modernized to launch P-35B Utyoz (NATO reporting name: SS-N-3B Sepal) and 3M44 Progress missiles. While the aging 3M44 missile has been largely replaced in Russian service by the 3K60 Bal (NATO reporting name: SSC-6 Sennight) and the K-300P Bastion-P (NATO reporting name: SS-C-5 Stooge), the complex is still used by the Russian Navy to launch target drones and test anti-aircraft defense systems during live-fire exercises.

In 2016, NPO Mashinostroyeniya announced plans to install a stationary anti-ship missile launcher based on the Bastion system and capable of firing 3M22 Zircon missiles in Crimea. There was also information that it would be installed on the Object 100 complex.

== History ==
Commissioned into service in July 1957, the Object 100 complex was initially armed with Sopka anti-ship missiles. In April 1973, the complex was reactivated after being modernized to fire P-35B missiles. Upgrades included a new radar, identification friend or foe system, upgraded control center, launchers, and new ground equipment. The folding-wing missiles could be assembled underground and loaded into the launchers, which would be raised for launch and lowered for reloading. In 1982, the complex was modernized once again to launch 3M44 Progress missiles with effective range increased from 270 km (168 mi) to 460 km (286 mi) and capable of carrying a 350 kiloton nuclear warhead.

After the dissolution of the Soviet Union in 1991, control of the complex was transferred to the Ukrainian Navy in 1996, apparently falling into disuse. According to Reuters, the abandoned site was a tourist attraction.

Following the annexation of Crimea by the Russian Federation in 2014, it was reactivated by the Russian Navy in 2016, mostly for training purposes, though it reportedly saw action during the Russo-Ukrainian War, with at least one 3M44 launched against ground targets.

According to Defense Express, the underground complex or a mobile Bastion launcher deployed in Crimea may have been used to launch the 25 March 2024 attack on Kyiv with 3M22 Zircon missiles.

== See also ==
- SS-N-3 Shaddock
- K-300P Bastion-P – and silo K-300S P-800 variant
- R-500 9M728
- Kh-35 3M24 SS-N-25, Bal
- 3M-54 Klub
