= Juliett-class submarine =

Soviet diesel-electric cruise missile submarine

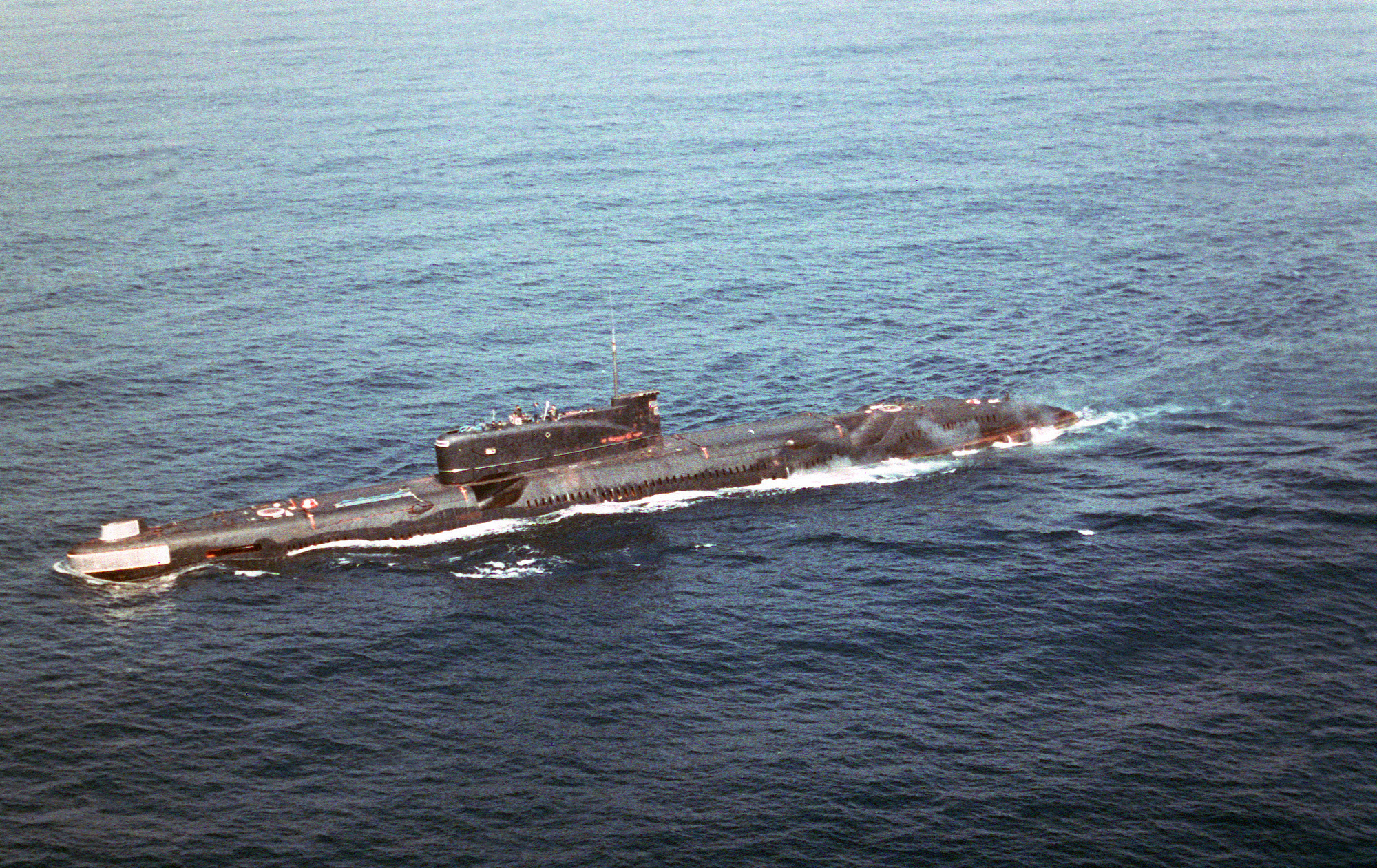
- K-77, a Project 651 submarine

Class overview
- Operators: Soviet Navy
- Preceded by: 659
- Succeeded by: Skat class
- Subclasses: 1960–1968
- In commission: 1963–1994
- Planned: 35
- Completed: 16
- Canceled: 19
- Retired: 16
- Preserved: 1

General characteristics
- Type: Submarine
- Displacement: 3,174 t (3,124 long tons) (surfaced); 3,750 t (3,690 long tons) (submerged)
- Length: 85.9 m (281 ft 10 in)
- Beam: 9.7 m (31 ft 10 in)
- Draft: 3.29 m (10 ft 10 in)
- Propulsion: 2 × propeller shafts; 2 × diesel engines (4,000 PS (2,900 kW)); 2 × electric motors (3,000 PS (2,200 kW)); 2 × electric motors (200 PS (150 kW))
- Speed: 16 knots (30 km/h; 18 mph) (surfaced); 18 knots (33 km/h; 21 mph) (submerged)
- Range: 18,000 nmi (33,000 km; 21,000 mi) at 7 knots (13 km/h; 8.1 mph) (snorkeling); 27.8 nmi (51.5 km; 32.0 mi) at 18 knots (33 km/h; 21 mph) (submerged)
- Test depth: 240 m (790 ft)
- Complement: 78
- Sensors & processing systems: Artika-M (MG-200) and Herkules (MG-15) sonars; Feniks-M (MG-10) and MG-13 hydrophones; Albatros (RLK-50) search radar; Argument missile guidance radar
- Electronic warfare & decoys: Nakat-M ESM
- Armament: 2 × twin SS-N-3 Shaddock (P-5 or P-6) cruise missiles; 6 × 533 mm (21 in) bow torpedo tubes; 4 × 406 mm (16 in) stern torpedo tubes

The Soviet Navy's Project 651 (NATO reporting name: Juliett) was a class of Soviet diesel-electric cruise-missile submarines. They were designed in the late 1950s to provide them with a nuclear strike capability against targets along the east coast of the United States and enemy combatants (aircraft carriers). The head of the design team was Abram Samuilovich Kassatsier. They carried four nuclear-capable cruise missiles with a range of approximately 300 nautical miles (560 km), which could be launched while the submarine was surfaced and moving less than four knots (7.4 km/h). Once surfaced, the first missile could be launched in about five minutes; subsequent missiles would follow within about ten seconds each. Initially, the missiles were the inertially-guided P-5 (NATO reporting name SS-N-3c Shaddock). When submarine-launched ballistic missiles rendered the P-5s obsolescent, they were replaced with the P-6 (also NATO reporting name SS-N-3a Shaddock, though a very different missile) designed to attack aircraft carriers. A special 10 m^{2} target guidance radar was built into the forward edge of the sail structure, which opened by rotating. One boat was eventually fitted with the Kasatka satellite downlink for targeting information to support P-500 4K-80 "Bazalt" (SS-N-12 Sandbox) anti-ship cruise missiles. The Juliett class had a low magnetic signature austenitic steel double hull, covered by two inches (51 mm) thick black tiles made of sound-absorbing hard rubber.

== Background and description ==
In the late 1950s, the Soviet Navy was tasked to neutralize American bases and aircraft carriers. It began construction of a large number of expensive nuclear-powered (Echo-class submarines) to accomplish this, but could not build enough nuclear reactors to equip them promptly. Even though the Juliett class was inferior to the Echos, it was ordered into production because it did not require resources needed for the nuclear boats.

The Juliett-class boats are a double-hulled design that displaces 3,174 metric tons (3,124 long tons) on the surface and 3,750 tonnes (3,690 long tons) submerged. The boats have an overall length of 85.9 meters (281 ft 10 in), a beam of 9.7 meters (31 ft 10 in) and a draft of 6.29 meters (20 ft 8 in). The Julietts have a test depth of 240 meters (790 ft) and a design depth of 300 meters (980 ft). The prominent blast deflectors cut out of the outer hull behind the missile launchers make the submarines very noisy at high speed. Their crew numbered 78 men.

=== Propulsion and performance ===
The Juliett class is powered by a diesel-electric system that consists of two 4,000-metric-horsepower (2,900 kW) 1D43 diesel engines and a pair of 3,000 PS (2,200 kW) MG-141 electric motors for cruising on the surface. Two additional 200 PS (150 kW) electric motors are intended for slow speeds underwater and are powered by four banks of lead-acid battery cells that are recharged by a 1,000 PS (740 kW) 1DL42 diesel generator. The boats are fitted with a retractable snorkel to allow the diesel engines to operate while underwater.

On the surface, the submarines have a maximum speed of 16 knots (30 km/h; 18 mph). Using their diesel-electric system while snorkeling gives the Julietts a range of 18,000 nautical miles (33,000 km; 21,000 mi) at 7 knots (13 km/h; 8.1 mph). Using just the electric motors underwater, they have a maximum range of 810 nmi (1,500 km; 930 mi) at 2.74 knots (5.07 km/h; 3.15 mph). Their best submerged speed on electric motors is 18 knots (33 km/h; 21 mph), although it reduces their range to 27.8 nmi (51.5 km; 32.0 mi). They could carry enough supplies for 90 days of operation.

=== Armament ===
To carry out the Julietts' mission of destroying American carrier battle groups and bases, they were fitted with two pairs of missile launchers, one each fore and aft of the sail. The launchers were used by the surface-launched SS-N-3 Shaddock family of long-range, turbojet-powered, cruise missiles. The P-5D version was codenamed SS-N-3c by NATO and was a dedicated land-attack missile that could be equipped with either a high-explosive or nuclear warhead; it was withdrawn from service in 1965–1966. The P-6 (SS-N-3a) variant was a radar-guided anti-ship missile that could also be fitted with high-explosive and nuclear warheads.

The more traditional armament of the Julietts consisted of six 533-millimeter (21 in) torpedo tubes mounted in the bow and four 406-millimeter (16 in) torpedo tubes in the stern. Due to space limitations, no reloads were provided for the bow tubes, but each stern tube had two reloads for a total of twelve.

=== Fire control and sensors ===
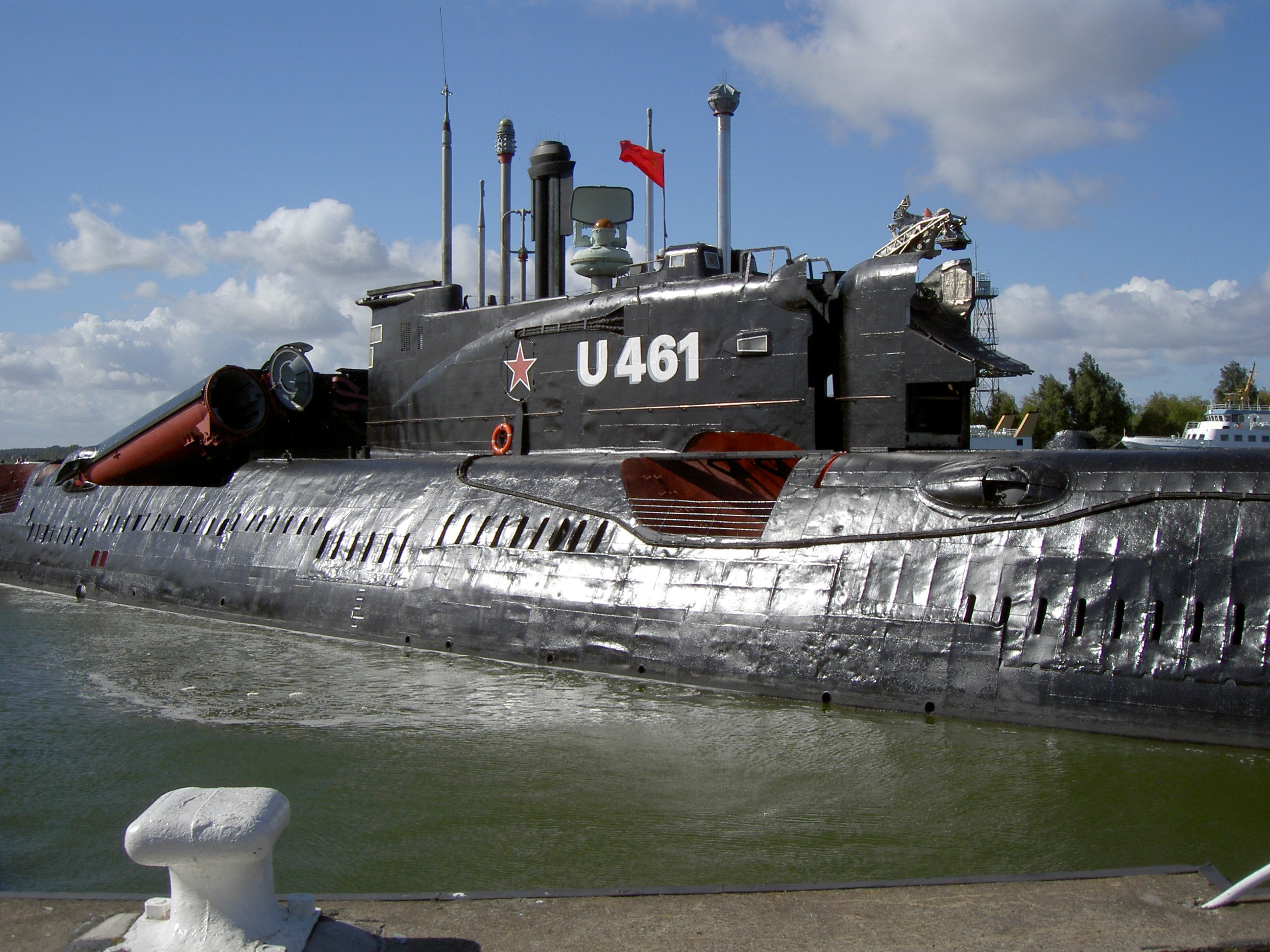
A photo of K-24 in Peenemünde, Germany. The Argument (Front Door) radar is at the front of the sail, with the Front Piece datalink above it. Aft of the sail, the rear missile mount is visible, elevated to its maximum of 15°.

The submarines relied upon aircraft for their long-range anti-ship targeting which they received via the Uspekh-U datalink system. Their own Argument missile-guidance radar (NATO reporting name: Front Door) controlled the P-6 missiles until they were out of range via a datalink codenamed Front Piece. The missiles' onboard radar would detect the targets and transmit an image back to the submarine via video datalink so the crew could select which target to attack, after which the missile relied upon its own radar for terminal guidance. The Argument radar has a massive antenna that was stowed at the front of the sail and rotated 180° for use. The Front Piece antenna was mounted on top of the Argument antenna.

The boats are fitted with Artika-M (MG-200) and Herkules (MG-15) sonars, Feniks-M (MG-10) and MG-13 hydrophones and an Albatros RLK-50 search radar (NATO reporting name: Snoop Tray). They are also equipped with a Nakat-M Electronic warfare support measures system.

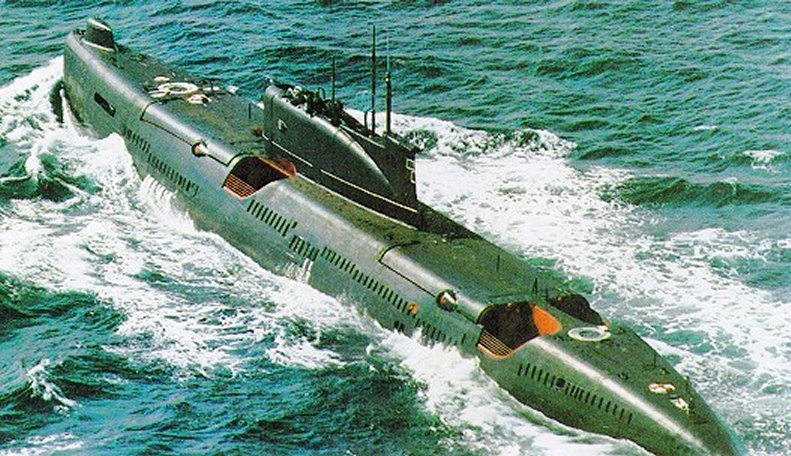
A Juliett-class submarine

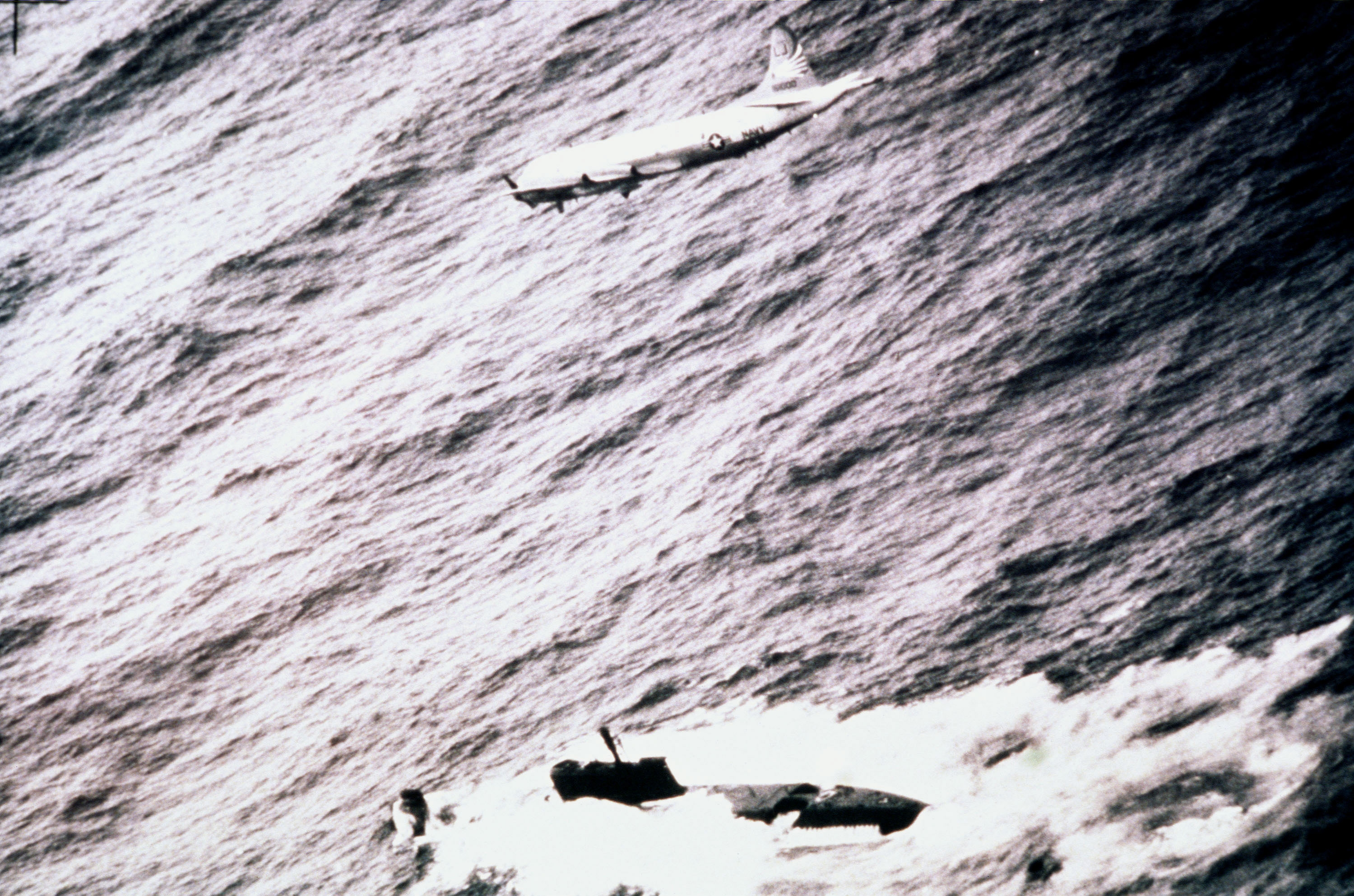
A P-3C flies over a Juliett-class submarine

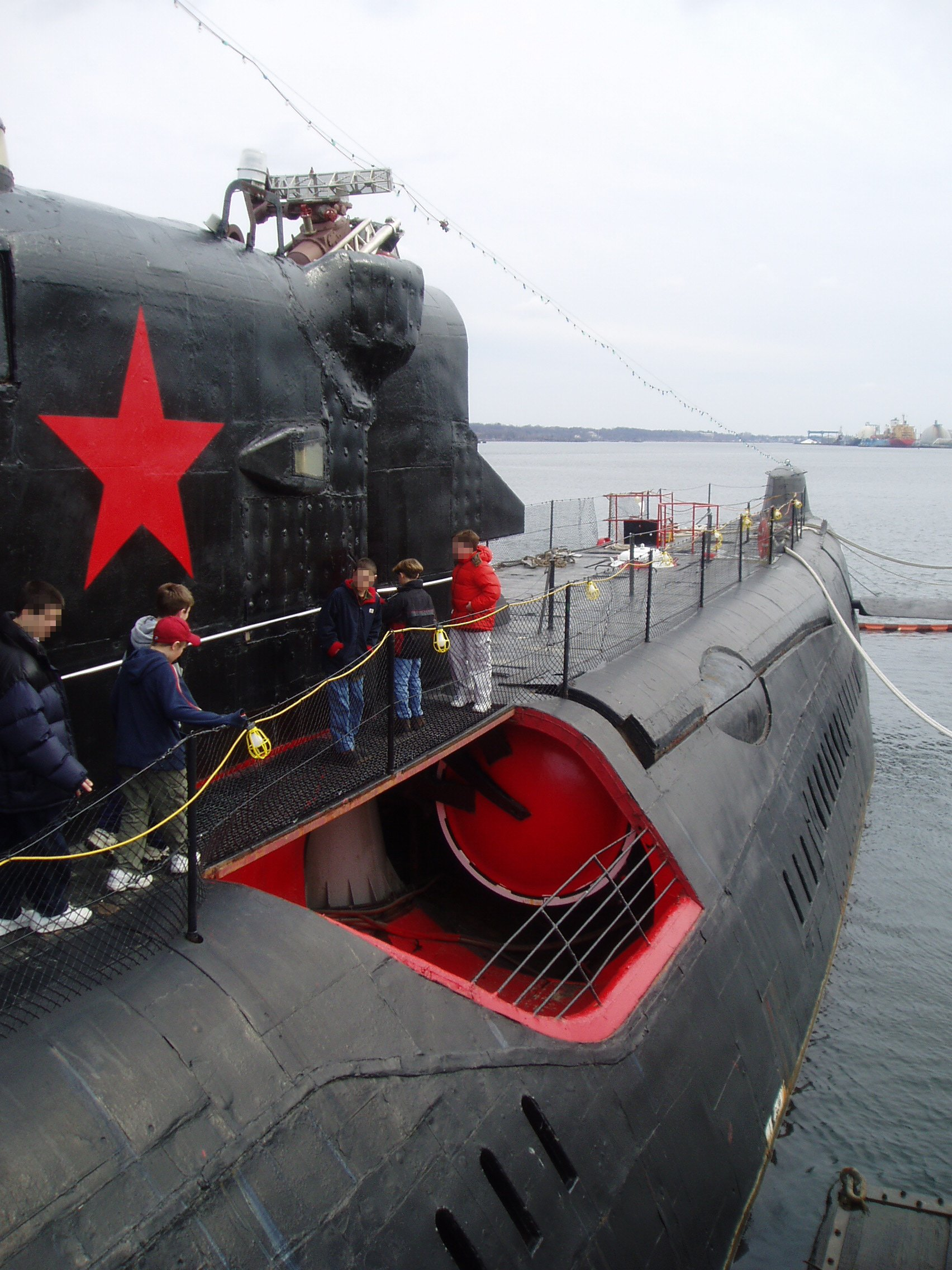
An oblique photo of a Juliett-class submarine showing the aft end of a missile launcher and the blast deflector

Initial plans called for 35 submarines of this class but only 16 were built, two - including the lead sub, by the Baltic Shipyard, St. Petersburg and the rest by the Krasnoye Sormovo Shipyard in Nizhny Novgorod. They were commissioned between 1963 and 1968 and served through the 1980s. The last one was decommissioned in 1994.

The Juliett class was built due to expected delays in the continued production of the nuclear-powered Project 659 Echo I-class submarines and 675 Echo II-class submarines, with six and eight missile launchers, respectively. The Julietts were designed after the Echos.

== Units ==
Construction data
Name	Shipyard	Laid down	Launched	Commissioned	Fate
K-156	Baltic Shipyard, Leningrad	November 16, 1960	July 31, 1962	December 10, 1963	Decommissioned September 1991 for scrapping
K-85	Baltic Shipyard, Leningrad	October 25, 1961	January 31, 1964	December 30, 1964	Decommissioned for scrapping
K-70	Krasnoye Sormovo Shipyard, Gorky	August 25, 1962	February 6, 1964	December 31, 1964	Decommissioned in 1994 for scrapping
K-24	Krasnoye Sormovo Shipyard, Gorky	October 15, 1961	December 15, 1962	October 31, 1965	Decommissioned in 1994, sold to Germany as maritime museum exhibit, displayed as "U-461" at Peenemünde.
K-68	Krasnoye Sormovo Shipyard, Gorky	January 25, 1962	April 30, 1963	December 28, 1965	Decommissioned in 1990 for scrapping
K-77	Krasnoye Sormovo Shipyard, Gorky	January 31, 1963	March 11, 1965	October 31, 1965	Decommissioned in April 1992 and sold as museum exhibit in U.S. Sank after a storm in 2007 and subsequently scrapped.
K-81	Krasnoye Sormovo Shipyard, Gorky	November 20, 1963	August 7, 1964	December 14, 1965	Decommissioned in 1994 for scrapping
K-63	Krasnoye Sormovo Shipyard, Gorky	March 25, 1962	July 26, 1963	June 12, 1966	Decommissioned in September 1991 for scrapping
K-58	Krasnoye Sormovo Shipyard, Gorky	July 15, 1963	February 2, 1966	September 23, 1966	Decommissioned 1990 for scrapping
K-73	Krasnoye Sormovo Shipyard, Gorky	August 1, 1964	May 31, 1966	December 15, 1966	Decommissioned in 1990 for scrapping
K-67	Krasnoye Sormovo Shipyard, Gorky	January 31, 1965	October 29, 1966	September 30, 1967	Decommissioned in 1994 for scrapping
K-78	Krasnoye Sormovo Shipyard, Gorky	July 25, 1965	March 30, 1967	November 1, 1967	Decommissioned in September 1991 for scrapping
K-203	Krasnoye Sormovo Shipyard, Gorky	December 23, 1965	June 30, 1967	December 2, 1967	Decommissioned in September 1992 for scrapping
K-304	Krasnoye Sormovo Shipyard, Gorky	August 6, 1966	November 24, 1967	August 21, 1968	Decommissioned in September 1991 for scrapping
K-318	Krasnoye Sormovo Shipyard, Gorky	March 29, 1967	March 29, 1968	September 29, 1968	Decommissioned in 1994 for scrapping
K-120	Krasnoye Sormovo Shipyard, Gorky	March 25, 1967	July 11, 1968	December 26, 1968	Decommissioned in April 1991 for scrapping

== Bibliography ==
- Friedman, Norman (1995). "Soviet Union 1947–1991: Russian Federation and Successor States 1991–". In Chumbley, Stephen (ed.). Conway's All the World's Fighting Ships 1947–1995. Naval Institute Press. pp. 337–426. ISBN 1-55750-132-7.
- Hampshire, Edward (2018). Soviet Cruise Missile Submarines of the Cold War. Osprey Publishing. ISBN 978-1-47282-499-8.
- Pavlov, A. S. (1997). Warships of the USSR and Russia 1945–1995. Naval Institute Press. ISBN 1-55750-671-X.
- Polmar, Norman & Moore, Kenneth J. (2004). Cold War Submarines: The Design and Construction of U.S. and Soviet Submarines. Potomac Books. ISBN 978-1-57488-594-1.
- Polmar, Norman & Noot, Jurrien (1991). Submarines of the Russian and Soviet Navies, 1718–1990. Naval Institute Press. ISBN 0-87021-570-1.
- Polmar, Norman (2026). Submarines of the Russian and Soviet Navies: 1946–2026. Schiffer Publishing. ISBN 978-0-7643-7083-0.
- Vilches Alarcón, Alejandro A. (2022). From Juliettes to Yasens: Development and Operational History of Soviet Cruise-Missile Submarines. Europe @ War. Vol. 22. Helion & Co. ISBN 978-1-915070-68-5.
