= SS-N-3 Shaddock =

Submarine-launched cruise missile

SS-N-3 Shaddock/Sepal
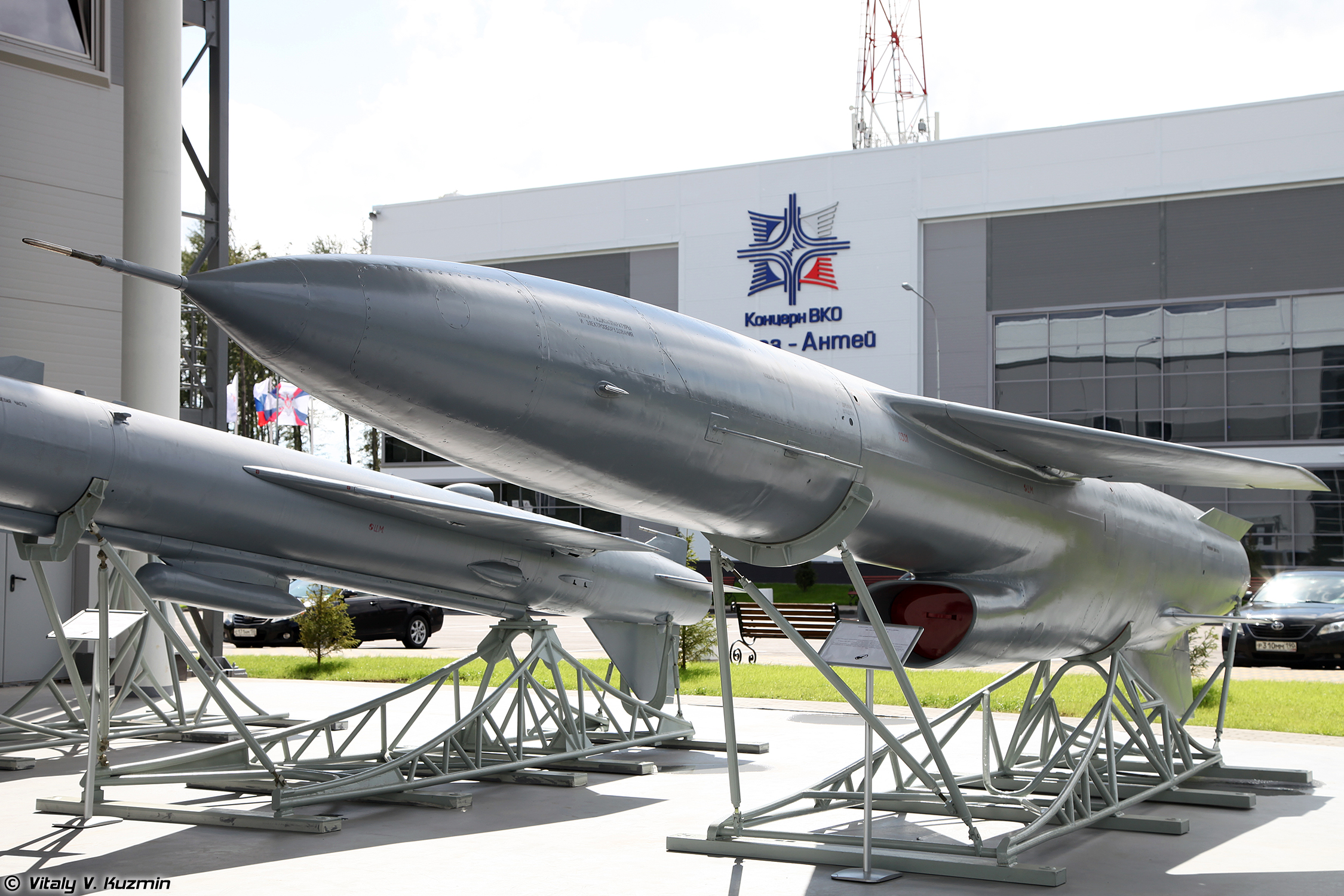
- A P-5 missile on static display, red air intake cover clearly visibile
- Type: Cruise missile
- Place of origin: Soviet Union

Service history
- In service: 1963−1991 (USSR)
- Used by: See operators
- Wars: Russo-Ukrainian War

Production history
- Designer: Chelomey Design Bureau
- Variants: See variants

Specifications
- Mass: 5,300 kg (11,700 lb)
- Height: 10.8 m (35 ft)
- Diameter: 0.98 m (3 ft 3 in)
- Wingspan: 2.5 m (8 ft 2 in)
- Warhead: HE SAP or nuclear
- Warhead weight: 650 or 870 kg (1,430 or 1,920 lb)
- Blast yield: 10 or 200 kt
- Engine: Turbojet with solid fuel boosters
- Propellant: Liquid fuel
- Operational range: 300 or 450 km (190 or 280 mi)
- Maximum speed: 1.3 Mach
- Guidance system: Inertial with commands and infrared or active radar
- Launch platform: Echo II-class submarine; Juliett-class submarine; Kresta I-class cruiser; Kynda-class cruiser; BAZ-135 TEL; Object 100

The P-5 Pityorka (Russian: П-5 «Пятёрка», lit. 'five'), also known by the NATO reporting name SS-N-3 Shaddock for submarine-launched versions and SS-N-3 Sepal for ship and coastal defence versions, is a Cold War era turbojet-powered cruise missile of the Soviet Union, designed by the Chelomey design bureau. Originally designed as a strategic nuclear weapon, it entered service in 1963 with the Soviet Navy. All ship and submarine launched versions remained in service until 1994, while coastal defence batteries remain in limited service with the Russian Navy.

== Overview ==
The SS-N-3 Shaddock and Sepal missiles are 10.8 m (35 ft) long with a body diameter of 0.98 m (3 ft 3 in). Two swept-wings 2.5 m (8 ft 2 in) long unfold forward after launch. A turbojet engine and an air inlet are located at the rear of the missile, while two solid propellant motors boost the missile during launch. The missile can cruise at altitudes of 100 m (330 ft), 4,000 m (13,000 ft), or 7,500 m (24,600 ft) at a maximum speed of 1.3 Mach. After the boosters are jettisoned, the turbojet powers the missile for the rest of the flight.

Guidance was provided by a 'Scoop Pair' (for surface ships) or 'Front Door' (for submarines) radar for shorter ranges or via data link by fixed-wing aircraft or helicopters including the Tu-16 Badger, Tu-95 Bear-D, Ka-25 Hormone, and Ka-27 Helix. In the latter case, the aircraft could send radar pictures to the ship or submarine launcher allowing the weapons control officer to program the missile with the target coordinates. A drawback of the Shaddock was that the launching submarine had to remain surfaced after launch up to 25 minutes when firing against targets at a range of 250 nautical miles (460 km; 290 mi).

Later upgrades used satellite surveillance data to allow the weapons control officer to plan the path of the missiles. The missile uses an inertial navigation system with command updates to steer the missile mid-flight while during the terminal flight phase, a radar altimeter and a infrared or active radar homing system are used to guide the missile towards the target.

The P-5, P-6, and P-35 missiles have a minimum firing range of 25 km (16 mi) and can carry conventional high-explosive, semi-armour piercing (HE SAP) warhead, a 10 kiloton nuclear warhead, or a 650 kg (1,430 lb) nuclear warhead with a yield of 200 kt.

== Variants ==
The NATO reporting names for the P-5 family of missiles were assigned out of order and do not reflect the Soviet development process, given the limited intelligence available at the time. Also while the ship-launched versions are designated by NATO as Sepal, they are generally referred to as Shaddock.

- P-5 Pityorka (NATO reporting name: SS-N-3C Shaddock) − Submarine-launched strategic strike missile with inertial guidance only. Withdrawn from service in 1965.
- P-5D (NATO reporting name: SS-N-3C Shaddock) − Improved version with increased range and better chance of penetrating enemy defenses to reach its targets. Accepted for service in 1962 and withdrawn in 1965.
- P-6 (NATO reporting name: SS-N-3A Shaddock) − Submarine-launched anti-ship missile variant.
- P-7 − Extended range prototype based on the P-5 with a range of 1,000 km (620 mi) The missile was tested in 1962−1964, but development was halted after the Soviets decided to focus on the development of submarine-mounted anti-ship missiles.
- P-10 − Prototype designed by the Beriev Design Bureau, four missiles were test launched from a modified Zulu-class submarine in the fall of 1957, but further work was halted following successful testings with the P-5 missile.
- P-20 − Long range prototype based on the P-5, development was halted in February 1960.
- P-35 Utes (NATO reporting name: SS-N-3B Sepal) − Ship-launched variant, it can also be fired from a transporter erector launcher (TEL).
- P-35B Redut (NATO reporting name: SS-N-3B Sepal) − Coastal defence missile mounted on a BAZ-135 8×8 wheeled TEL.
- P-35E (NATO reporting name: SS-N-3B Sepal) − Export variant of the P-35 with shorter range and lighter missiles.
- 3M44 Progress − Upgraded version of the P-35 mounted on a TEL or the Object 100 fixed anti-ship missile launcher. It has a reported range of 460 km (286 mi) and can carry a 350 kt nuclear warhead.
- Target missile and UAV − Russia and Syria also used target and unmanned aerial vehicle conversions of Shaddock/Sepal missiles.

== Deployment ==
=== Naval platforms ===
==== Guided missile submarines ====
Between 1961 and 1964, Thirteen Whiskey-class submarines (1 "Single Cylinder", 5 "Twin Cylinder", and 7 "Long Bin") were converted into guided missile submarines to carry SS-N-3 Shaddock missiles. They remained in service until 1985, when the last Whiskey-class guided missile submarine was decommissioned.

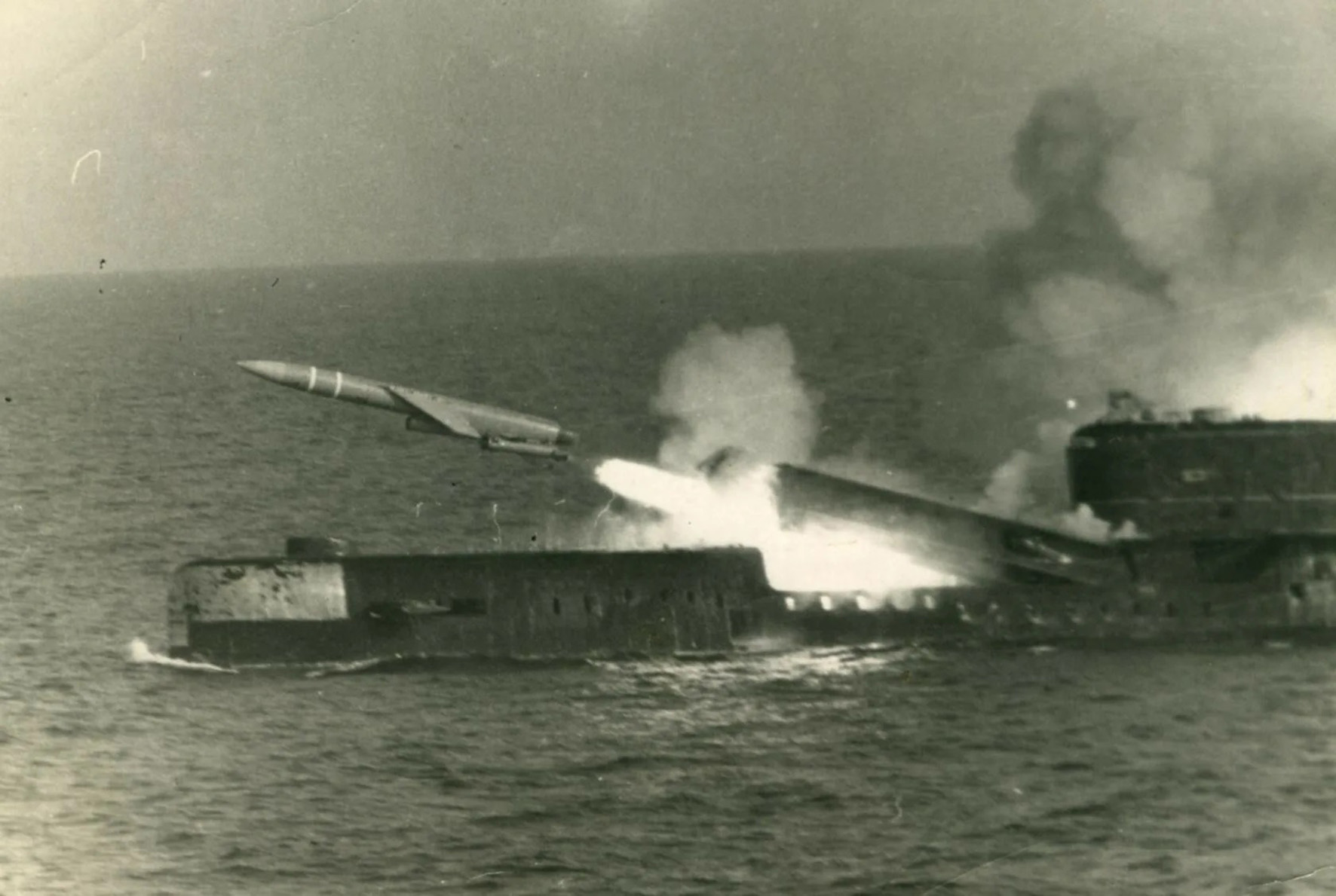
An Echo II-class submarine launching a P-5 missile.

While the Echo-class submarine didn't have enough space for the Shaddock guidance radar, the improved Echo II had enlarged hulls capable of carrying 8 Shaddock missiles. They were all decommissioned from service by the end of 1993.

The Juliett-class submarines were the diesel-electric equivalent of the Echo II-class with half the missile capacity. They were all decommissioned by the end of 1994.

==== Missile cruisers ====
The Kynda-class cruiser carried 16 P-35 (SS-N-3B Sepal) missiles mounted in two quadruple-launchers one forward and the other aft. They were all removed from service by 1995.

The Kresta I-class cruiser was supposed to carry the more advanced P-500 Bazalt missiles, but due development delays it was forced to carry 4 Sepal missiles mounted on two twin-launchers.

=== Land-based platforms ===
==== Mobile coastal defence ====
In the coastal defence role, the SS-N-3B Sepal is carried by a BAZ-135 8×8 wheeled TEL carrying a single missile. The TEL has a length of 13.5 m (44 ft), a width of 2.86 m (9 ft 5 in), and combat weight of 21,000 kg (46,000 lb). The TEL carries a crew of five and has a road speed of 40 km/h (25 mph).

==== Fixed coastal defence ====
In 1954, the Soviets built an underground anti-ship missile complex known as Object 100 in the mountains near Balaklava, to protect Sevastopol and the Soviet Union's southern maritime approaches. While it initially employed Sopka anti-ship missiles, the system was modernized to fire P-35 missiles in 1973, and 3M44 Progress missiles in 1982.

== Operational history ==
Originally designed to allow submarines to launch strategic strikes against ground targets, the P-5 was withdrawn from service in 1965. During the mid-1950s the Soviet premier Nikita Khrushchev demanded priority on the development of submarine-launched anti-ship cruise missiles to counter American aircraft carriers. The P-6 missile was mounted on submarines, surface ships (as the P-35), and coastal defence batteries.

After the dissolution of the Soviet Union, all submarine and ship-launched missiles were withdrawn from Russian Navy service by 1994, while coastal defence missiles were kept for tests and target practice.

The Syrian Navy employed a number of Soviet and Russian coastal defence batteries, including P-35 missiles. Following the fall of the Assad regime, the Israeli Navy launched an attack aimed at Syrian naval bases to prevent their assets from falling into the hands of Hay'at Tahrir al-Sham and other rebel groups. As of February 2025, the status of Syrian naval defenses remain unknown.

=== The Lake Inari incident ===
On 28 December 1984 a SS-N-3 missile used as a target by the Soviet Navy strayed over the Finnish border and crashed into Lake Inari. A Finnish early warning radar at Rovaniemi and a close-range radar at Kaamanen picked it up, and two Saab 35 Draken fighters were dispatched, but were unable to find anything. A few days later, a reindeer herder found a plastic cover of the electronics compartment, and unable to identify it, brought it to a Border Guard post. Finnish military analysts recognized it as a MiG component. The missile was a modified version fitted with avionics taken from MiG for remote control. The missile had punched itself through the lake ice, thus the crash site was easily identifiable, and the Finnish military soon lifted the missile from the lake for analysis. The likely cause was loss of radio contact between the operator and the missile. Although the cause for the accident was mundane, it came at an unfortunate time, just before an international conference on cruise missiles, and there was much speculation whether it was a Soviet show of force.

=== Russo-Ukrainian War ===
Object 100 coastal defence launching SS-N-3 Shaddock

In 18 January 2024, photos showing the wreckage of a P-35B or a 3M44 Progress missile (either shot down by Ukrainian air defenses or crashed after experiencing some sort of failure) were circulated through social media. Given the economic sanctions against Russia and the Ukrainian Navy lack of large warships, the Russians have launched anti-ship missiles against ground targets in Ukraine.

According to The War Zone, the missile could have been launched either from the Object 100 fixed launcher or a TEL based in Crimea.

== Operators ==
=== Current operators ===
- Angolan Navy − One Sepal battery based in Luanda
- Russian Navy − Submarine and ship-launched missiles withdrawn from service by 1994. Some Sepal coastal batteries remain active as of 2025
- Syrian Navy − P-35 used on coastal batteries. Status unknown following the fall of the Assad regime and Operation Bashan Arrow
- Vietnam People's Navy − Used on coastal batteries

=== Former ===
- Bulgarian Navy − Used on coastal batteries
- Soviet Navy − SS-N-3A Shaddock and SS-N-3B Sepal missiles remained in service in 1991, passed on to the Russian Navy
- Ukrainian Navy − Object 100 transferred to Ukraine in 1996, it was non-operational prior to the annexation of Crimea by the Russian Federation

== Gallery ==
A sketch of the P-5 missile.

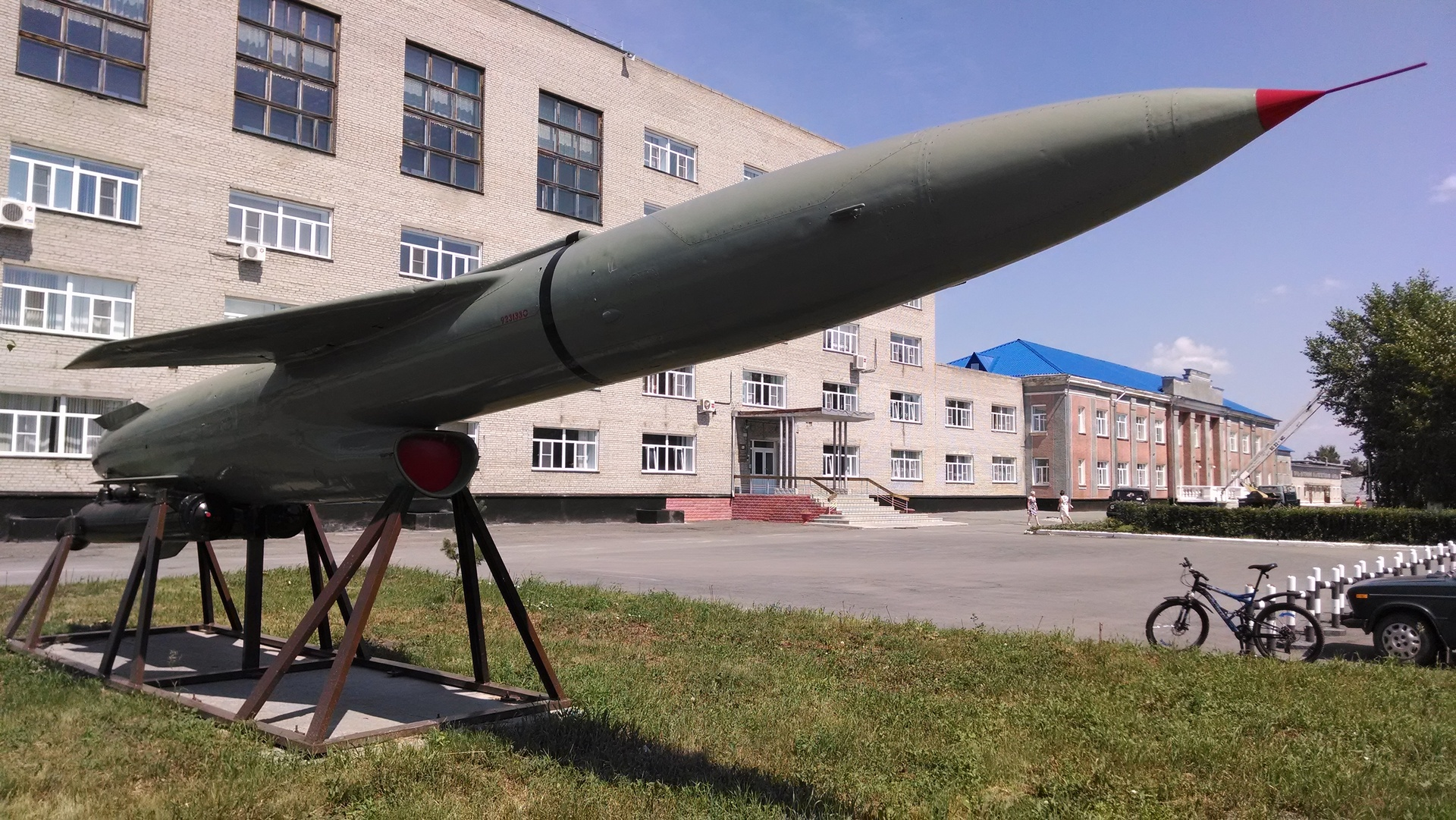
A P-5 missile.

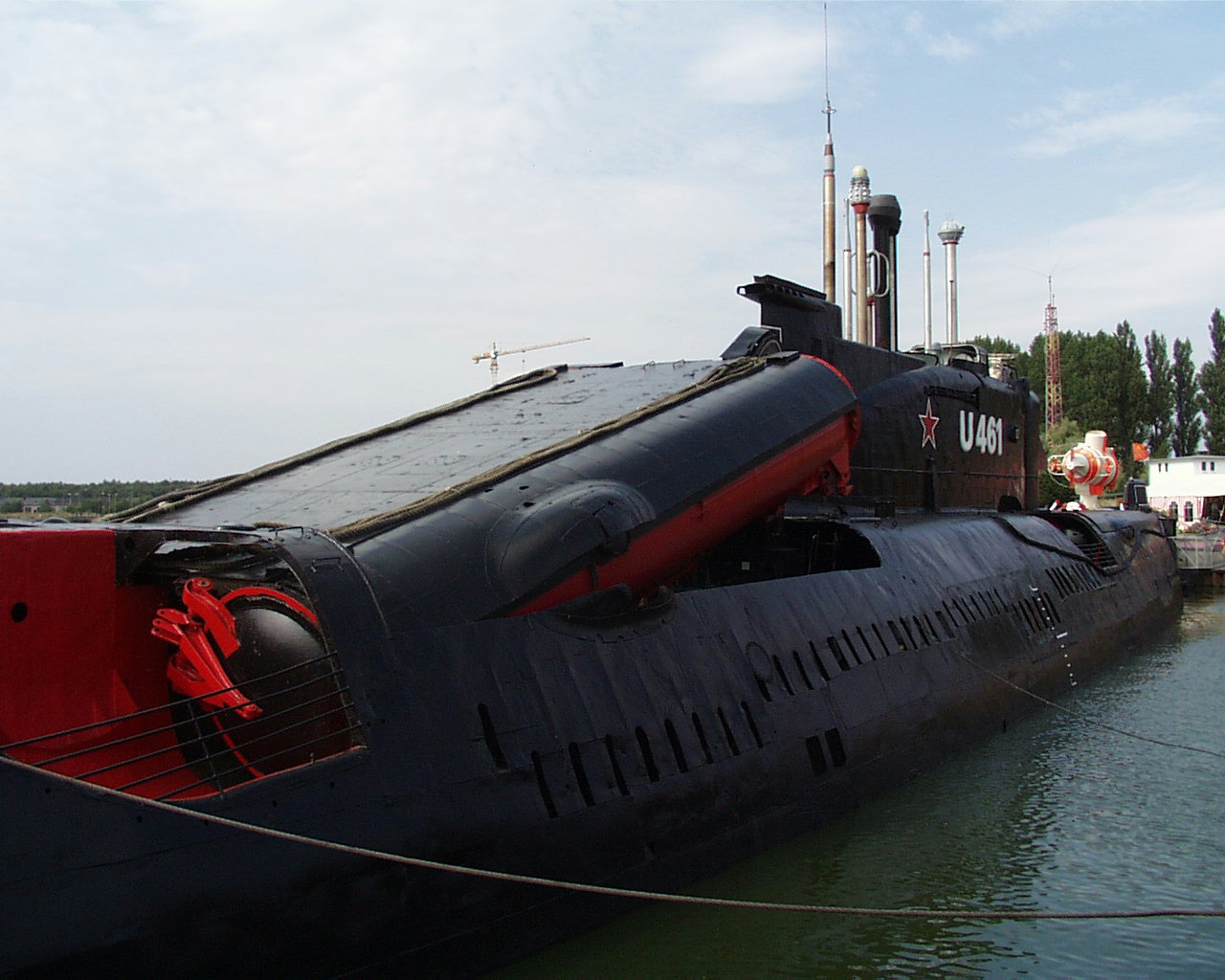
Juliett-class submarine with P-5 missile launchers raised.

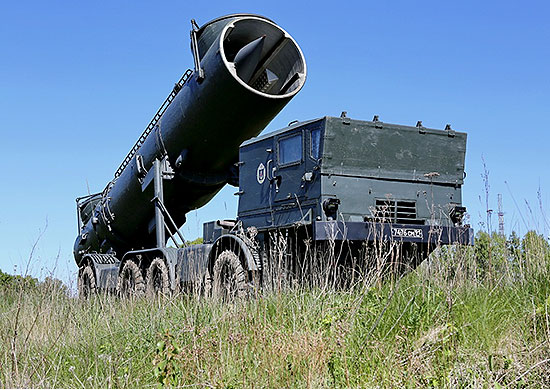
A Redut coastal missile battery.
