= Norman Polmar =

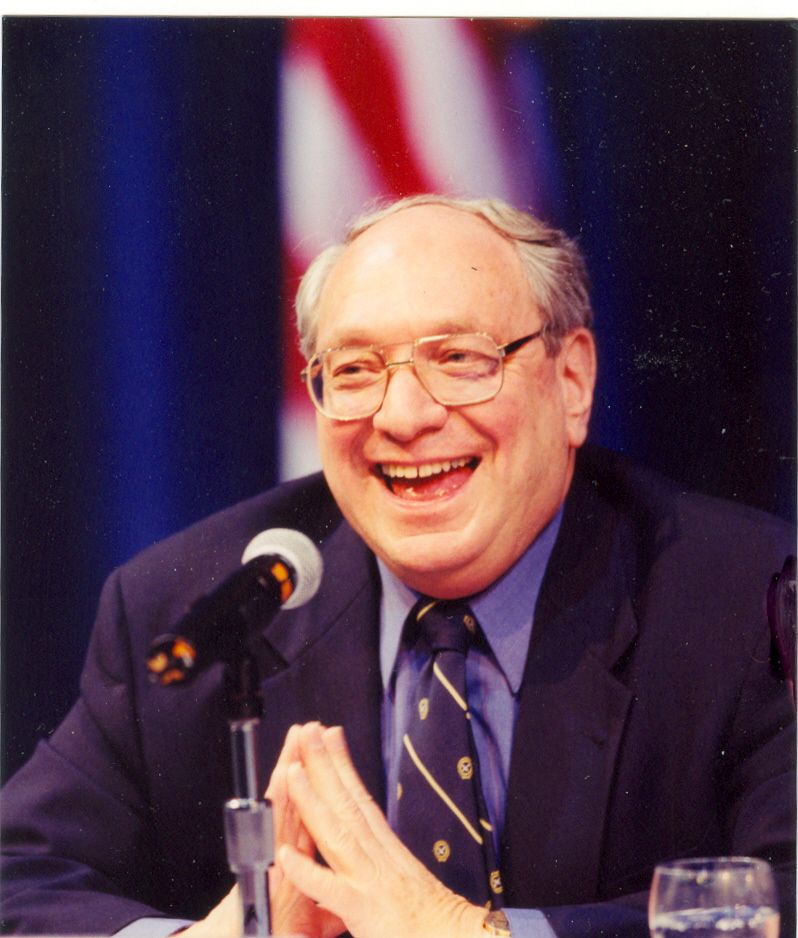
- Born: May 14, 1938 (age 88); Washington, D.C.
- Education: American University, B.A., 1965

Norman Polmar is an author specializing in the naval, aviation, and intelligence areas.

He has led major projects for the United States Department of Defense and the United States Navy, and foreign governments. His professional expertise has served three Secretaries of the U.S. Navy and two Chiefs of Naval Operations. He is credited with 50 published books, including nine previous editions of Ships and Aircraft of the U.S. Fleet and four editions of Guide to the Soviet Navy. Polmar writes a column for Proceedings and was editor of the United States and several other sections of the annual publications of Janes Fighting Ships.

In 2019, the Naval Historical Foundation awarded Polmar the Commodore Dudley W. Knox Naval History Lifetime Achievement Award.

== Bibliography ==
- Spy Book: The Encyclopedia of Espionage by Norman Polmar and Thomas B. Allen
- Death of the Thresher
- The Naval Institute Guide to Ships and Aircraft of the U.S. Fleet
- Project Azorian: The CIA and the Raising of the K-129 by Norman Polmar, Michael White, Michael White Norman Polmar
- Rickover: Controversy and Genius, a Biography by Norman Polmar and Thomas B. Allen
- Strategic Air Command: People, Aircraft, and Missiles
- Guide to the Soviet Navy
- Defcon-2: Standing on the Brink of Nuclear During the Cuban Missile Crisis
- Code-Name Downfall: The Secret Plan to Invade Japan and Why Truman Dropped the Bomb by Norman Polmar and Thomas B. Allen
- Defenseless: Command Failure at Pearl Harbor by Jack Lambert, Norman Polmar, Jack W. Lambert
- Naval Air War in Vietnam by Peter B. Mersky and Norman Polmar
- The Enola Gay: The B-29 That Dropped the Atomic Bomb on Hiroshima by Norman Polmar
- World War II: The Encyclopedia of the War Years 1941–1945 by Norman Polmar and Thomas B. Allen
- Spy Ships: One Hundred Years of Intelligence Collection by Ships and Submarines by Norman Polmar and Lee J. Mathers
- Opening the Great Depths: The Bathyscaph Trieste and Pioneers of Undersea Exploration by Norman Polmar and Lee J. Mathers
- Submarine Aircraft Carriers: From World War I to the Age of Drones
- Cold War Submarines: The Design and Construction of U.S. and Soviet Submarines by Norman Polmar and Kenneth J. Moore.
