= Gennady Suchkov =

Russian naval officer

Gennady Aleksandrovich Suchkov
- Born: 7 January 1947; Mitropolye, Sechenovsky District, Gorky Oblast, Russian SFSR, Soviet Union
- Died: 7 August 2013 (aged 66) Moscow, Russia
- Buried: Troyekurovskoye Cemetery
- Allegiance: Soviet Union; Russia
- Branch: Soviet Navy; Russian Navy
- Service years: 1964-2007
- Rank: Admiral
- Commands: Pacific Fleet; Northern Fleet
- Awards: Order of Friendship; Order of the Red Star; Order "For Service to the Homeland in the Armed Forces of the USSR" Third Class

Gennady Aleksandrovich Suchkov (Russian: Геннадий Александрович Сучков; 7 January 1947 – 7 August 2013) was an officer of the Soviet and Russian Navies. He held the rank of admiral, and served as commander of the Pacific Fleet in 2001, and the Northern Fleet from 2001 to 2003.

Born in 1947, Suchkov joined the navy after studying at the M. V. Frunze Higher Naval School, and was assigned to the Northern Fleet. He began a long career associated with submarines, rising from junior positions to eventually command his own vessels. After reaching higher ranks he served in staff positions as commander of the 42nd Submarine Brigade and 4th Submarine Squadron. He was then appointed First Deputy Commander of the Black Sea Fleet, before briefly becoming Commander-in-Chief of the Pacific Fleet in 2001. Later that year he was appointed commander of the Northern Fleet when the preceding commander, Admiral Vyacheslav Popov, was removed following the Kursk submarine disaster. Suchkov spent less than three years in this post before another submarine accident occurred in the fleet. The decommissioned K-159 sank on 30 August 2003 while being towed for scrapping, resulting in the deaths of nine sailors. Suchkov was temporarily removed from command 2003 and put on trial on charges of negligence. Despite support and the belief that Suchkov was being made the scapegoat for the loss, he was convicted and sentenced to four years of suspended imprisonment. He nevertheless became an advisor to the Minister of Defence, and in retirement became President of the International Association of Public Organizations of Navy Veterans and Submariners. He died in 2013, having received a number of honours and awards.

== Naval career ==
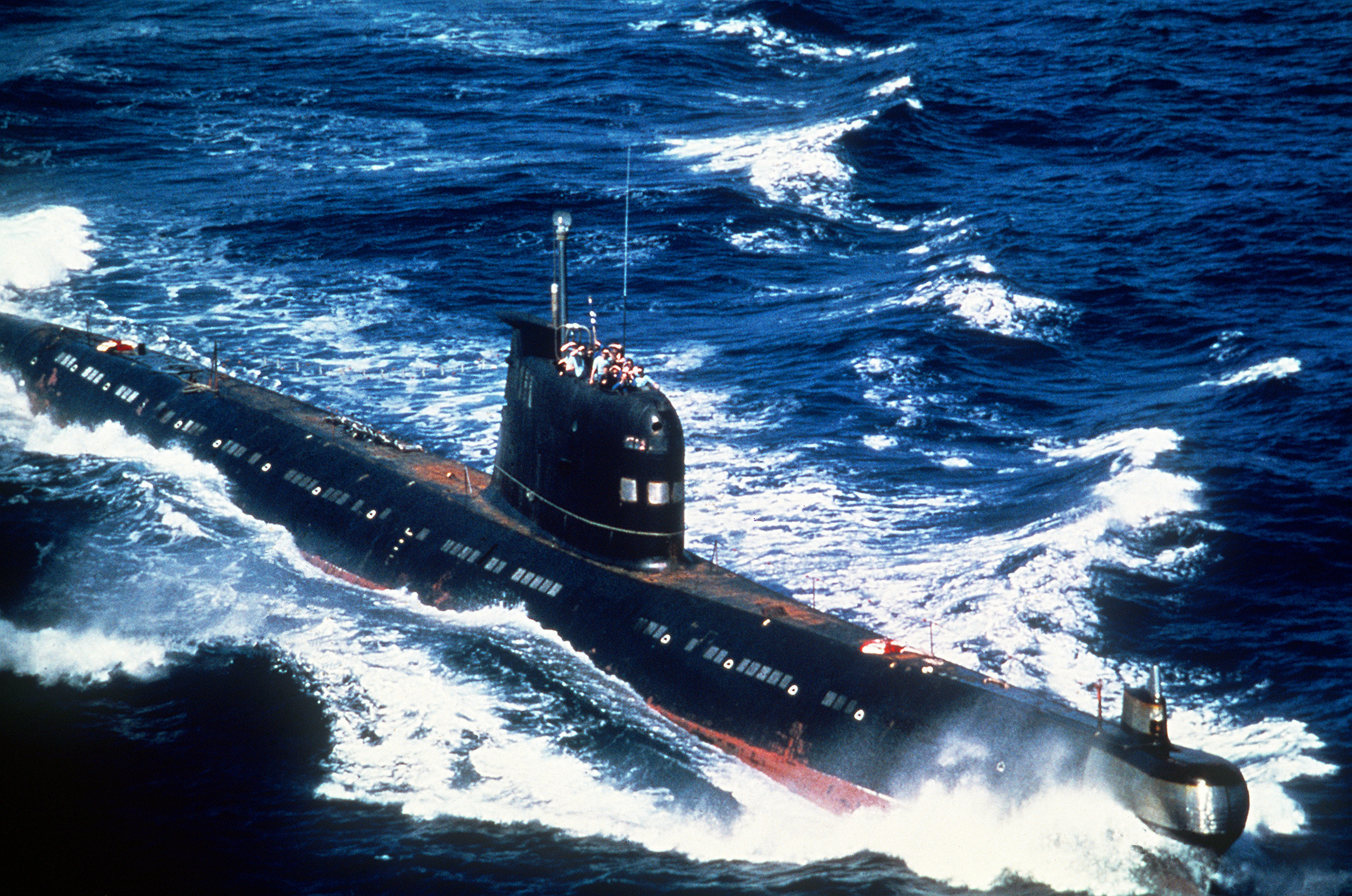
A Foxtrot-class submarine underway. Suchkov commanded the B-105 and B-4 of this class.

Suchkov was born on 7 January 1947 in the village of Mitropolye, Sechenovsky District, in what was then Gorky Oblast, Russian Soviet Federative Socialist Republic, in the Soviet Union. He entered the Soviet Navy, studying at the M. V. Frunze Higher Naval School in Leningrad from 8 April 1964 to 1969. On graduating he was commissioned as a lieutenant and assigned to the Northern Fleet. He was initially placed on a minesweeper, but pressed for a submarine posting, and was appointed commander of the torpedo department of a large submarine, based out of Polyarny. Unusually for submariners, he was a teetoller. From 1970 to 1972, he was head of the submarine's combat department, and then served as assistant and then executive officer of the submarine. He took the Higher Special Officer Classes of the Navy from 1977, graduating in July 1978 and returning to the Northern Fleet in command of the Foxtrot-class submarine B-105, until 1980, and then her sister ship B-4 until 1981. He took the classes at the Naval Academy between 1981 and 1983, becoming chief of staff of the 69th Submarine Brigade on graduation, and in October 1985, he was appointed Chief of Staff and Deputy Commander of the Northern Fleet's 42nd Submarine Brigade. He was advanced to commander of the brigade in December 1985, holding the position until November 1988, when he became Chief of Staff and Deputy Commander of the fleet's 4th Submarine Squadron.

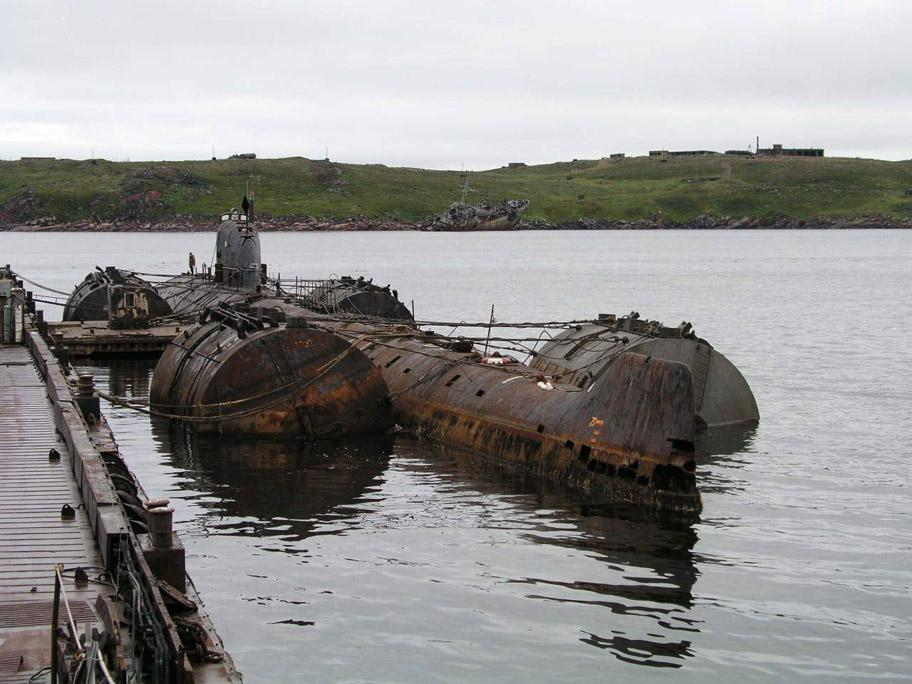
The decommissioned submarine K-159 in 2003. Her loss later that year led to Suchkov's criminal trial, and eventual dismissal as commander of the Northern Fleet.

Following the dissolution of the Soviet Union in late 1991, Suchkov continued to serve in the succeeding Russian Navy, becoming commander of the 4th Submarine Squadron in February 1992. He was appointed First Deputy Commander of the Black Sea Fleet and concurrently chief of the Sevastopol Garrison on 29 December 1994, and by presidential decree dated 19 July 2001, and Ministry of Defence order dated 25 July 2001, he was made Commander-in-Chief of the Pacific Fleet. He held this position for less than a year, being appointed to command the Northern Fleet on 4 December 2001. He succeeded Admiral Vyacheslav Popov, who had been removed as commander on 1 December, following the investigation into the Kursk submarine disaster. Suchkov was promoted to admiral on 21 February 2002, but was in his post for less than three years, when another submarine accident occurred in the fleet.

The decommissioned K-159 sank on 30 August 2003 while being towed for scrapping, resulting in the deaths of nine sailors. Suchkov was temporarily removed from command on 11 September 2003 and transferred to the disposal of the Minister of Defence while the investigation took place. Suchkov was brought to trial on charges of negligence on 12 January 2004, a case which became controversial with the belief that Suchkov was being made the scapegoat for the loss. One of the prosecuting lawyers withdrew during the trial on the grounds he was not convinced of Suchkov's guilt. An open letter in support of Suchkov was addressed to President Putin, and signed by Governor of Murmansk Oblast Yury Yevdokimov, 11 naval officers, and others. Nevertheless Suchkov was convicted on 18 May 2004. He was sentenced to four years of suspended imprisonment with a probationary period of two years. He appealed, but the original sentence was upheld on 6 September 2004.

== Family and later life ==
Suchkov nevertheless became an advisor to the Minister of Defence on naval issues in April 2005. He served in this role until 2007, when he retired from military service, and in December that year became President of the International Association of Public Organizations of Navy Veterans and Submariners. He was appointed a 3rd class Active State Councillor of the Russian Federation on 23 December 2008. Suchkov was married with two children. His son Aleksandr followed his father into the navy, also serving on Northern Fleet submarines and reaching captain 3rd rank. Suchkov died in Moscow on 7 August 2013 and was buried at the Troyekurovskoye Cemetery.

== Honours and awards ==
Over his career Suchkov has received the Order of Friendship, the Order of the Red Star, the Order "For Service to the Homeland in the Armed Forces of the USSR", and various other medals. He was made an honorary citizen of Polyarny. A monument to his memory was unveiled in Polyarny in 2016, and a square was named after him. Another bronze bust was erected after his death in Sechenovo, close to his home village, in Nizhny Novgorod Oblast.
