= Capital ship =

Leading ship of a naval fleet

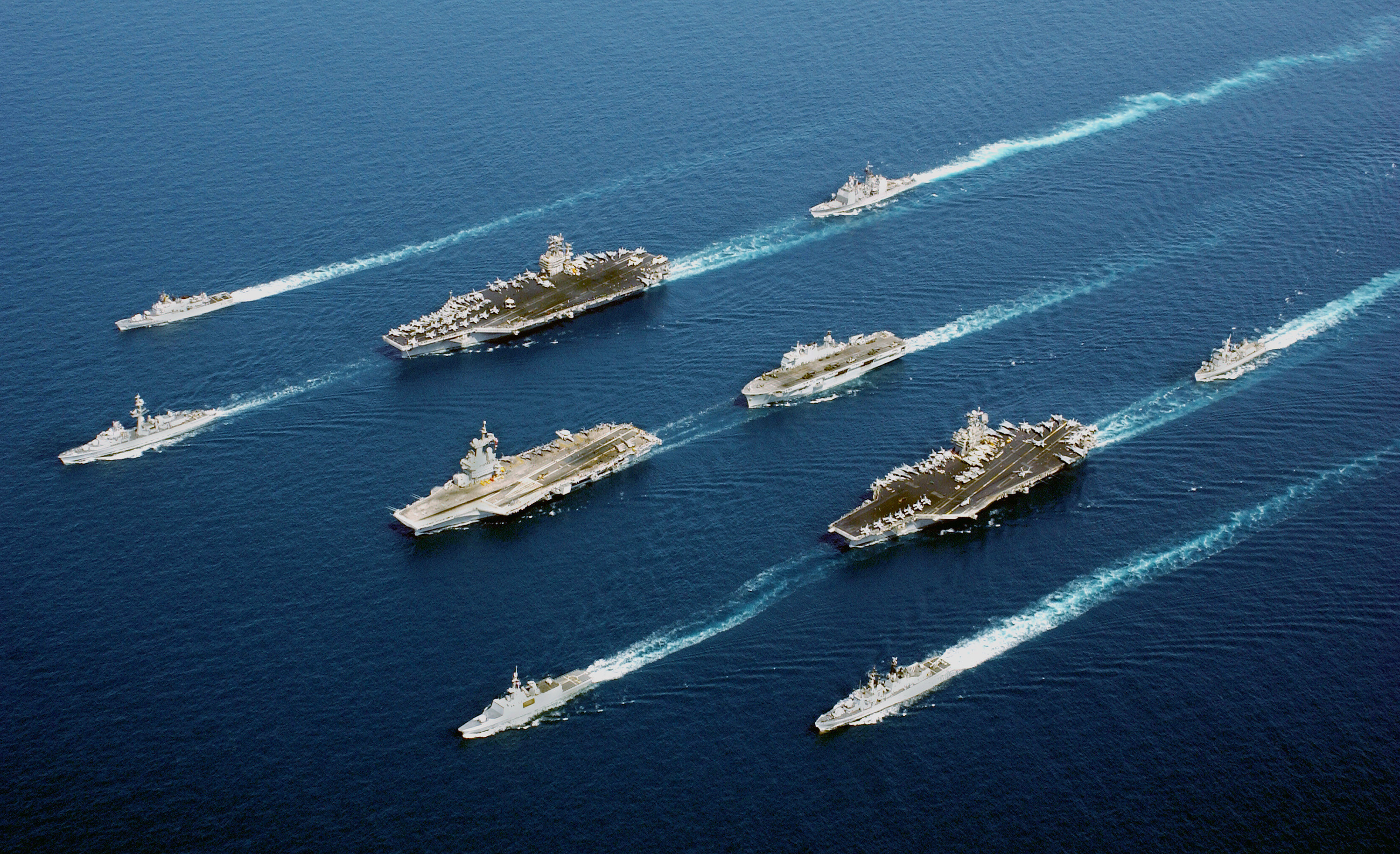
Aircraft carriers form the main capital ships of most modern-era blue-water navies.

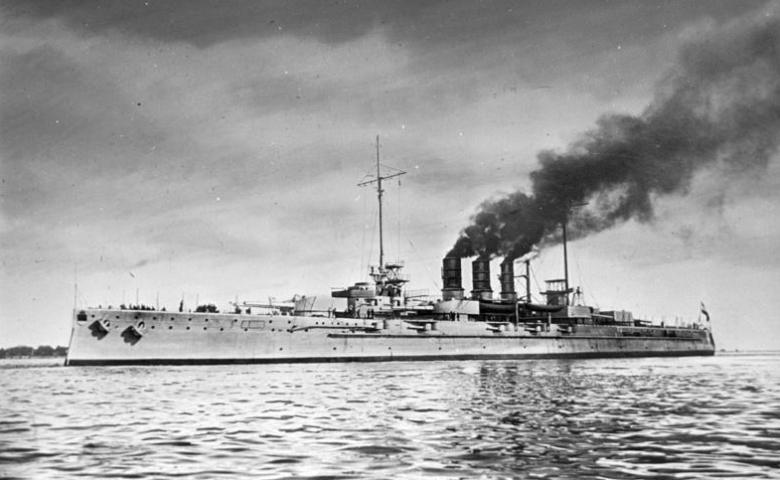
Battleships became the main form of capital ship after sailing vessels fell out of use, and remained so up to World War II. Shown is the German SMS Helgoland.

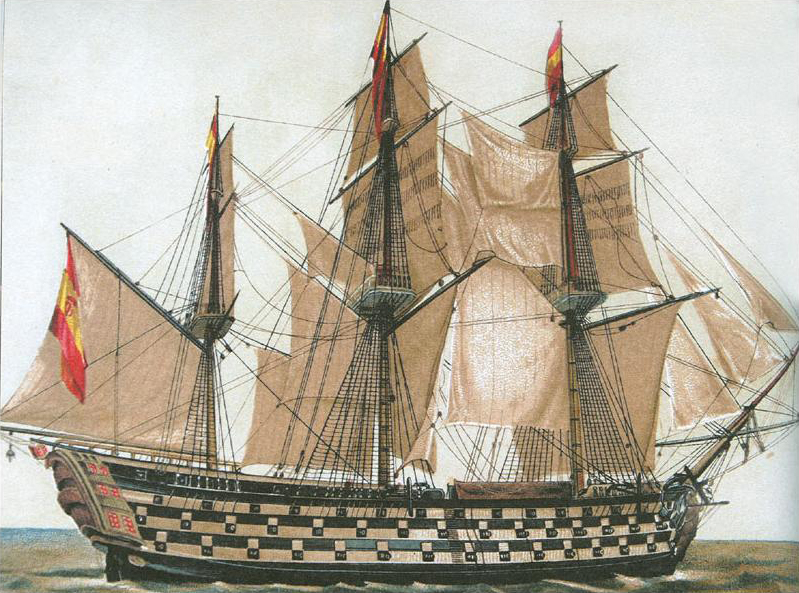
The 112-gun Spanish ship of the line Santa Ana, launched in 1784. Ships of the line were the capital ships of the Age of Sail.

The capital ships of a navy are its most important warships; they are generally the larger ships when compared to other warships in their respective fleet. A capital ship is generally a leading or a primary ship in a naval fleet.

== Strategic implications ==
There is usually no formal criterion for the classification, but it is a useful concept in naval strategy; for example, it permits comparisons between relative naval strengths in a theatre of operations without the need for considering specific details of tonnage or gun calibres.

A notable example of this is the Mahanian doctrine, which was applied in the planning of the defence of Singapore in World War II, where the Royal Navy had to decide the allocation of its battleships and battlecruisers between the Atlantic and Pacific theatres. The Mahanian doctrine was also applied by the Imperial Japanese Navy, leading to its preventive move to attack Pearl Harbor and the capital ships of the U.S. Pacific Fleet. The naval nature of the Pacific Theater of Operations, more commonly referred to as the Pacific War, necessitated the United States Navy mostly deploying its battleships and aircraft carriers in the Pacific. The war in Europe was primarily a land war; consequently, Germany's surface fleet was small, and the Allied escort ships needed in the Battle of the Atlantic were mostly destroyers and destroyer escorts to counter the U-boat threat.

== Age of Sail ==
Before the advent of the all-steel navy in the late 19th century, a capital ship during the Age of Sail was generally understood as a ship that conformed to the Royal Navy's rating system of a ship of the line as being of the first, second, third or fourth rates:

- First rate: 100 or more guns, typically carried on three or four decks. Four-deckers suffered in rough seas, and the lowest deck could seldom fire except in calm conditions.
- Second rate: 90–98 guns.
- Third rate: 64 to 80 guns (although 64-gun third-raters were small and not very numerous in any era).
- Fourth rate: 46 to 60 guns. By 1756, these ships were acknowledged to be too weak to stand in the line of battle and were relegated to ancillary duties, although they also served in the shallow North Sea and American littorals where larger ships of the line could not sail.

Frigates were ships of the fifth rate; sixth rates comprised small frigates and corvettes. Towards the end of the Napoleonic Wars and into the late 19th century, some larger and more powerful frigates were classified as fourth rates.

== Battleship / battlecruiser ==
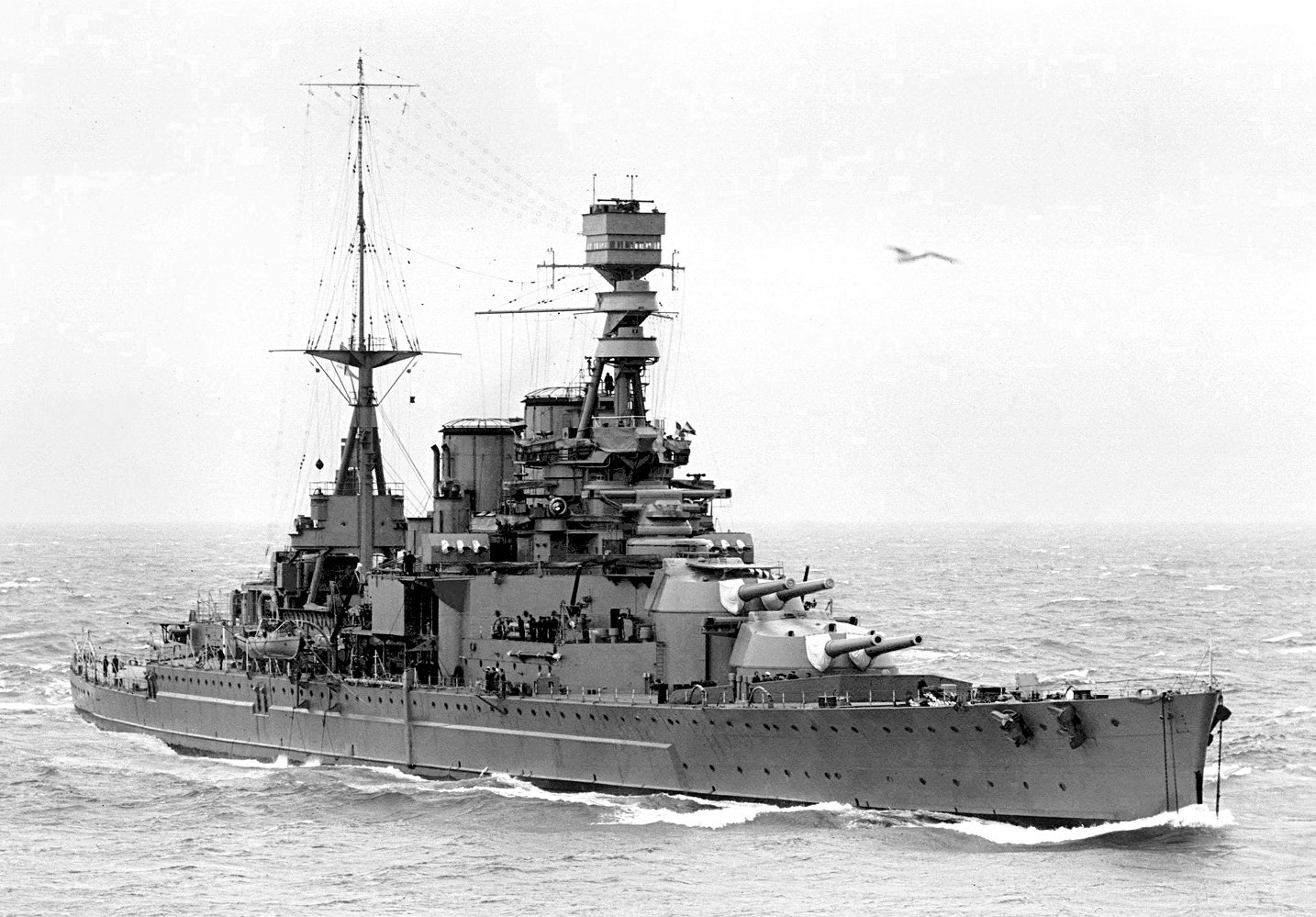
British battlecruiser HMS Repulse

The term "capital ship" was coined in 1909 and formally defined in the limitation treaties of the 1920s and 1930s, in the 1922 Washington Naval Treaty, 1930 London Naval Treaty, and 1936 Second London Naval Treaty. This applied mainly to ships resulting from the dreadnought revolution; dreadnought battleships (also known first as dreadnoughts and later as battleships) and battlecruisers. The term is also defined in the 1936 Montreux Convention.

In the 20th century, especially in World Wars I and II, typical capital ships would be battleships and battlecruisers. All of the above ships were close to 20,000 tons displacement or heavier, with large caliber guns and heavy armor protection.

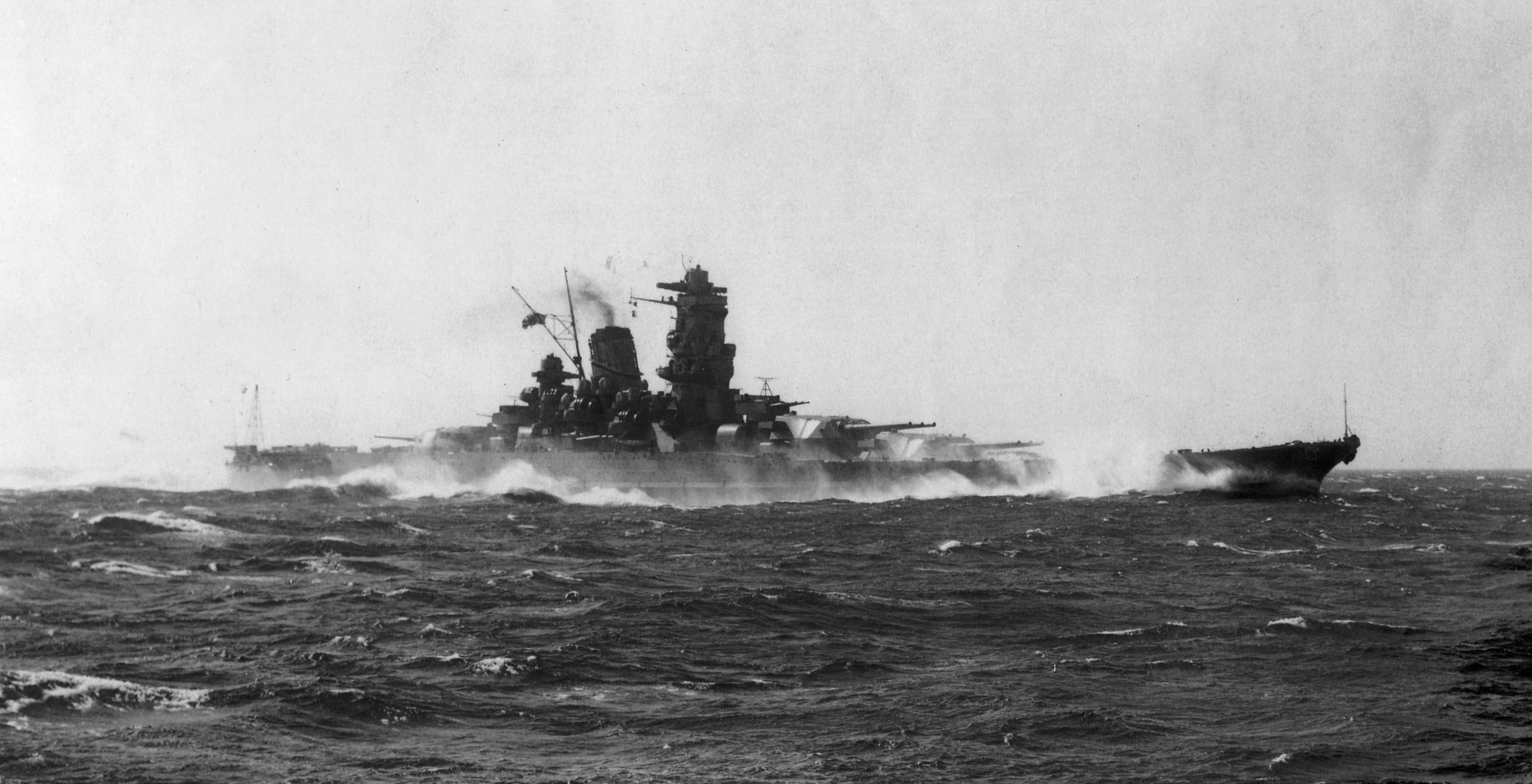
Japanese battleship Yamato, the lead ship of the largest class of battleships

Cruisers, despite being important ships, were not considered capital ships. An exception to the above in World War II was the Deutschland-class cruiser. Though this class was technically similar to a heavy cruiser, albeit slower but with considerably heavier guns, they were regarded by some as capital ships (hence the British label "Pocket battleship") since they were one of the few heavy surface units of the Kriegsmarine. The American Alaska-class cruiser, Dutch Design 1047 battlecruiser and the Japanese Design B-65 cruiser, planned specifically to counter the heavy cruisers being built by their naval rivals, have been described as "super cruisers", "large cruisers" or even "unrestricted cruisers", with some advocating that they even be considered battlecruisers; however, they were never classified as capital ships.

During the Cold War, a Soviet Kirov-class large missile cruiser had a displacement great enough to rival World War II-era battleships and battlecruisers, perhaps defining a new capital ship for that era. In regard to technical design, however, Kirov is simply an out-sized guided-missile cruiser with nuclear propulsion.

== Aircraft carrier ==
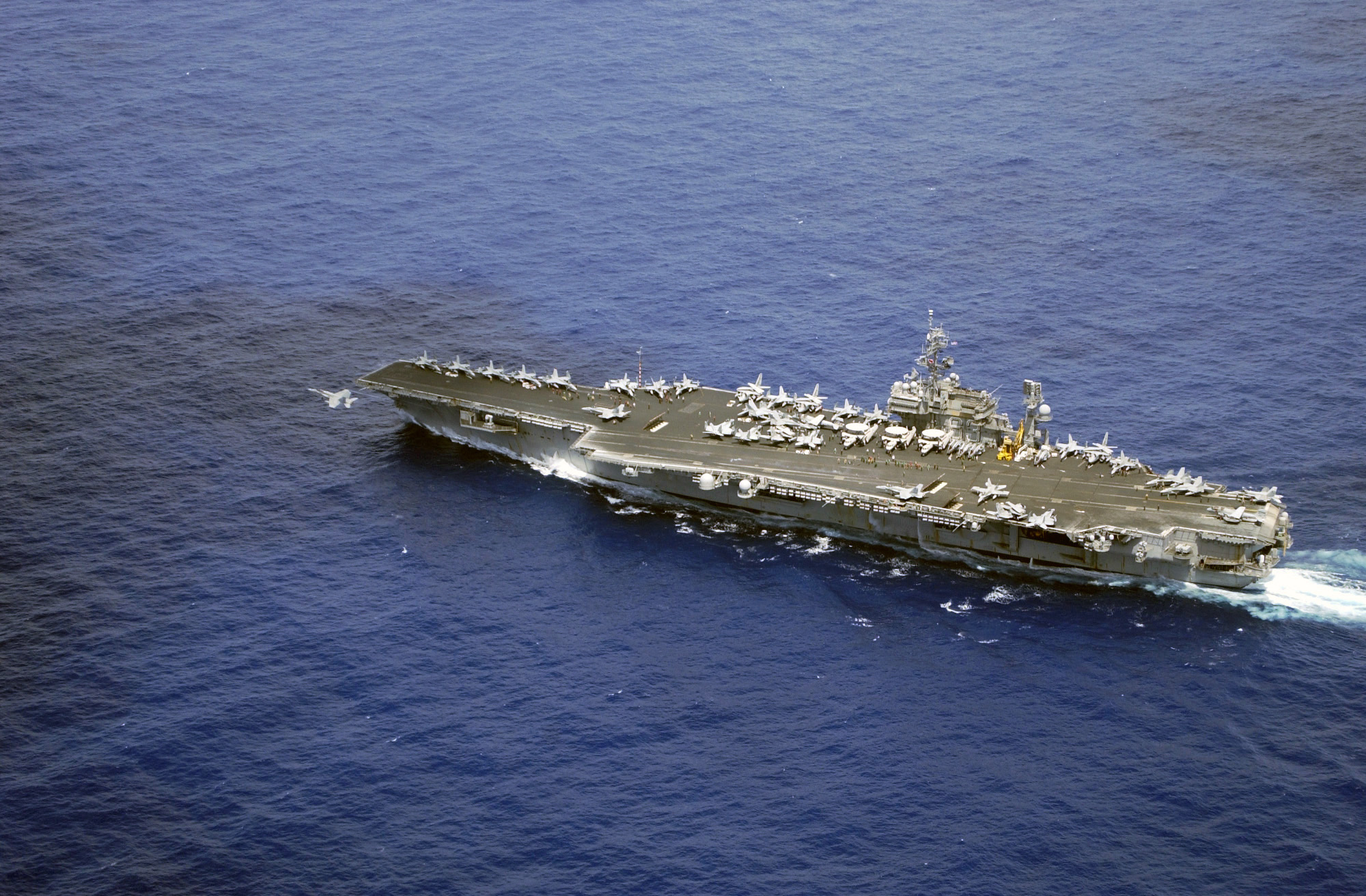
An F/A-18 Hornet launching from the flight deck of a modern aircraft carrier

It took until late 1942 for aircraft carriers to be universally considered capital ships. Only full-size fleet carriers (whether purpose-built or converted from battleship/battlecruiser hulls) were regarded as capital ships, while light carriers (often using cruiser hulls) and escort carriers (often using merchant ship hulls) were not. After the Japanese attack on Pearl Harbor in 1941 the U.S. Navy had to rely primarily on its aircraft carriers, none of which had been at Pearl Harbor at the time of the attack, which sank or damaged eight of its Pacific-fleet battleships.

In the 21st century, the aircraft carrier is the last remaining capital ship, with capability defined in decks available and aircraft per deck rather than in guns and calibers. The United States has supremacy in both contemporary categories of aircraft carriers, possessing 11 active duty supercarriers each capable of carrying and launching nearly 100 tactical aircraft, and nine amphibious assault ships which are equivalent in the "Sea Control Ship" configuration to the light VSTOL carriers operated by other nations.

== Nuclear submarine ==
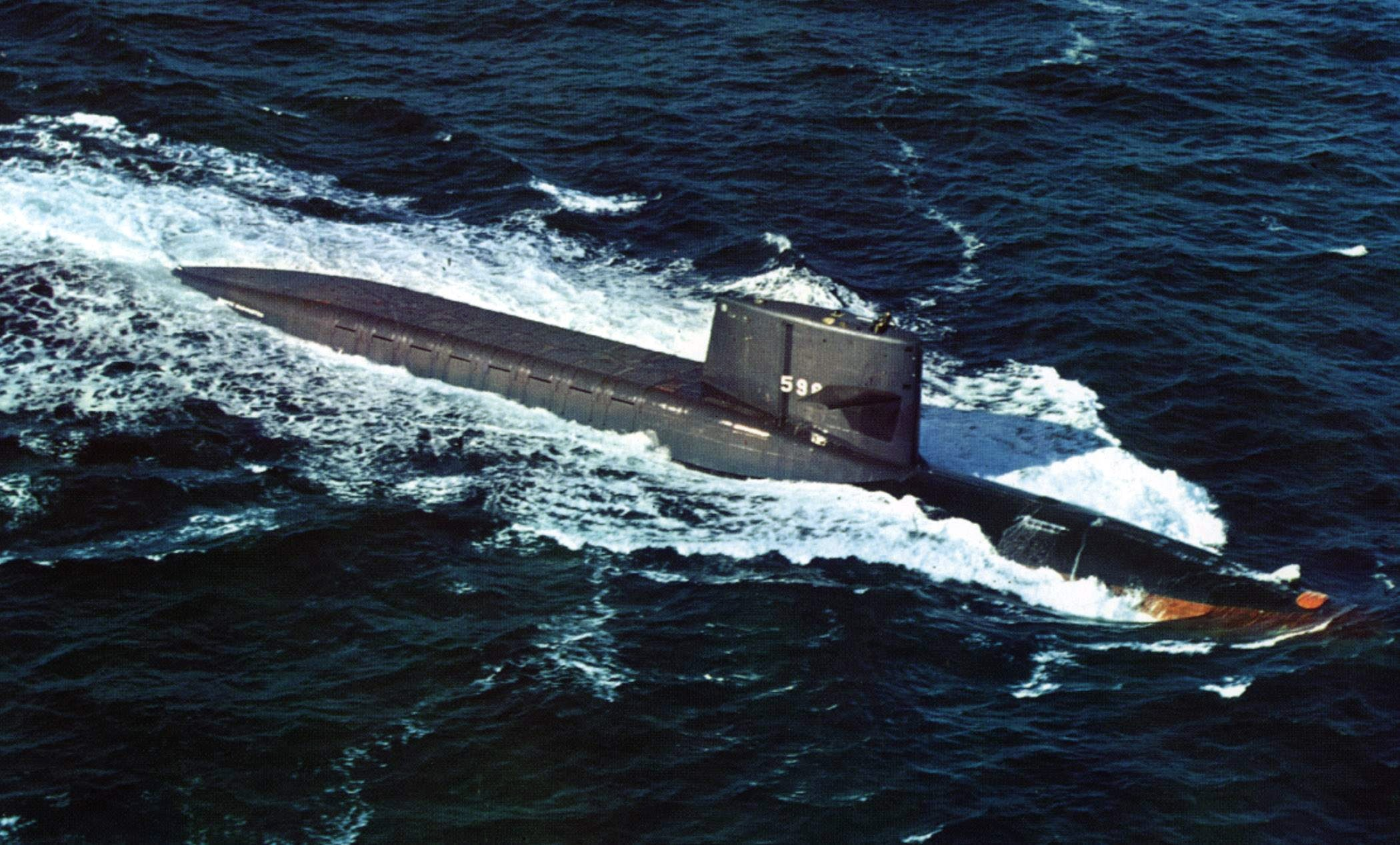
American ballistic missile submarine USS George Washington

Nuclear submarines, while important ships and similar in tonnage to early battleships, are usually counted as part of a nation's nuclear deterrent force and do not share the sea control mission of traditional capital ships. Nevertheless, many navies, including the Royal Navy and the United States Navy, consider these ships to be capital ships and have given some of them names previously used for battleships, e.g. Dreadnought and Vanguard, Oklahoma and Iowa.

== Naming ==
Some navies reserve specific names for their capital ships. Names reserved for capital ships include chiefs of state (e.g. Bismarck), important places, historically important naval officers or admiralty (e.g. De Ruyter), historical events or objects (e.g. USS Constitution), and traditional names (e.g. HMS Ark Royal). However, there are some exceptions to the rule.

Beginning with USS Texas (the first U.S. battleship), U.S. capital ships were traditionally named after U.S. states. (Note: Only one US battleship ever carried a non-state name: USS Kearsarge) Cruisers are typically named after U.S. territories (e.g. Alaska-class cruisers just before and during World War II) or U.S. cities. Prior to and during World War II, the Imperial Japanese Navy also followed the practice of naming battleships after provinces (e.g. Yamato).

The U.S. Navy has never named aircraft carriers after U.S. states. A variety of names (Wasp, Independence, ...) were used until 1968, when John F. Kennedy was commissioned, since then U.S. aircraft carriers are almost always named after politicians and people notable in US naval history, such as Gerald R. Ford (president) and Chester W. Nimitz (admiral); an exception is Enterprise.

US ballistic missile submarines were not initially named for states (e.g. Poseidon). Beginning with the Ohio class commissioned from 1981, the first class of Trident-equipped ballistic missile submarines, U.S. nuclear submarines have been named after states. After the completion of the last Ohio-class ballistic missile submarine, state names were also applied to attack submarines (e.g. Virginia class). Earlier attack submarines had usually been named for marine animals or, commencing with the Los Angeles class, cities and towns.

== See also ==
- Flagship
- List of sunken battleships
- List of sunken battlecruisers
- List of sunken aircraft carriers
- List of sunken nuclear submarines
