= Bolkhovsky =

Bolkhovsky (Russian: Болховский; masculine), Bolkhovskaya (Болховская; feminine), or Bolkhovskoye (Болховское; neuter) is the name of several rural localities in Russia:

- Bolkhovskoye, Lipetsk Oblast, a selo in Bolkhovskoy Selsoviet of Zadonsky District of Lipetsk Oblast
- Bolkhovskoye, Nizhny Novgorod Oblast, a selo in Vasilyevsky Selsoviet of Sechenovsky District of Nizhny Novgorod Oblast
