= K159 =

K159 or K-159 may refer to:

- K-159 (Kansas highway), a state highway in Kansas
- Soviet submarine K-159, a former Soviet Union submarine
