= Ivan Sechenov =

Russian physiologist and psychologist (1829–1905)

- Иван Сеченов
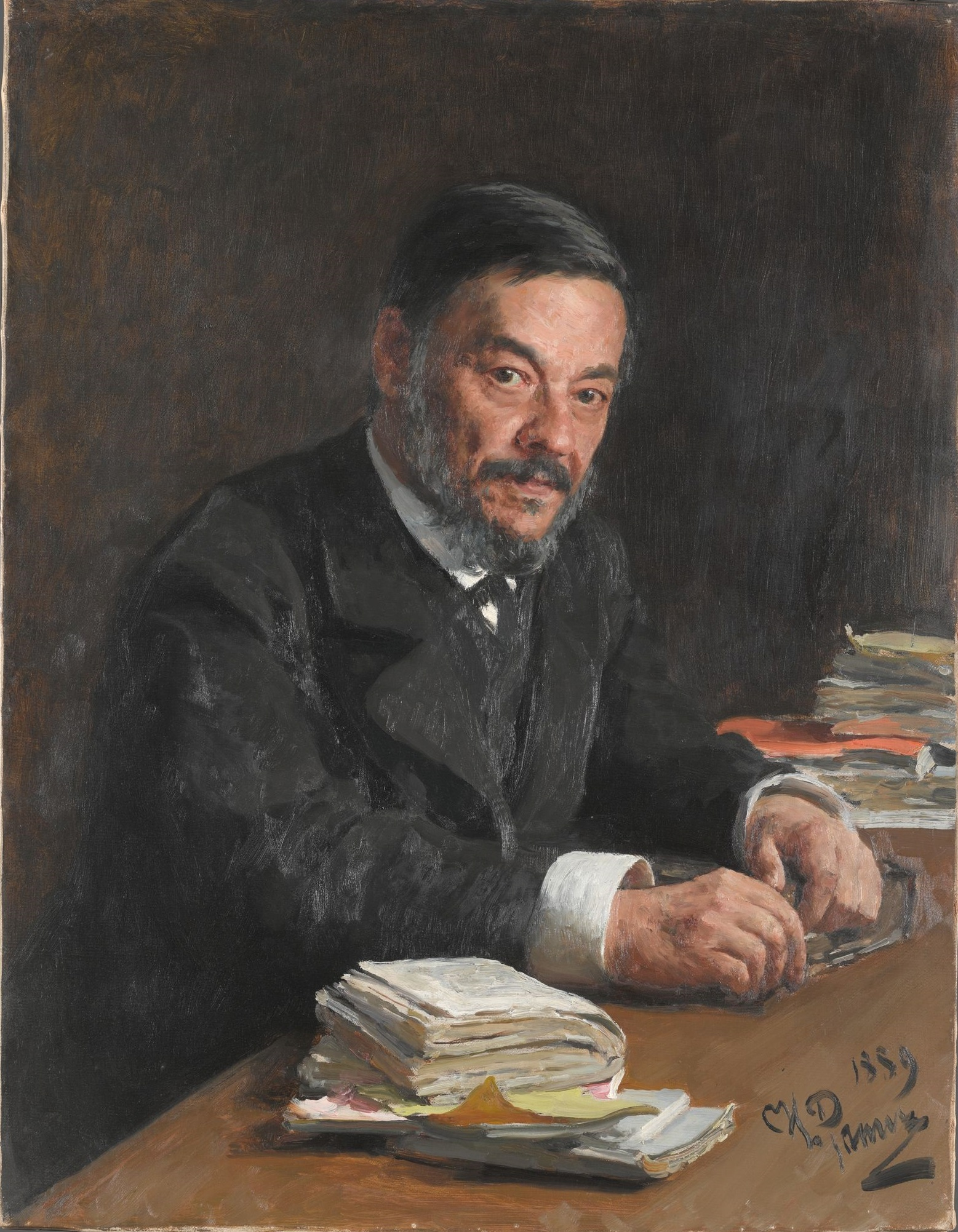
- Portrait by Ilya Repin, 1889
- Born: 13 August 1829; Tyoply Stan, Russia
- Died: 15 November 1905 (aged 76); Moscow, Russia
- Education: St. Petersburg Main Military Engineering School
- Alma mater: Moscow University; St. Petersburg Imperial Military Medical Academy
- Scientific career
- Fields: Physiology; neurophysiology; chemistry
- Workplaces: St. Petersburg Imperial Military Medical Academy; Novorossiysk University; St. Petersburg University

Ivan Mikhaylovich Sechenov (Russian: Ива́н Миха́йлович Се́ченов; 13 August [O.S. 1 August] 1829 – 15 November [O.S. 2 November] 1905) was a Russian psychologist, physiologist, and medical scientist.

Ivan Pavlov, the famous Russian neurologist and physiologist, referred to Sechenov as the "Father of Russian physiology and scientific psychology". Today Sechenov is more known for his contributions to medical physiology and neurology, in addition to his psychological work. Sechenov is also considered one of the originators of objective psychology, through his attempts to introduce objective experimental methods to the wider field of Russian psychology.

== Biography ==
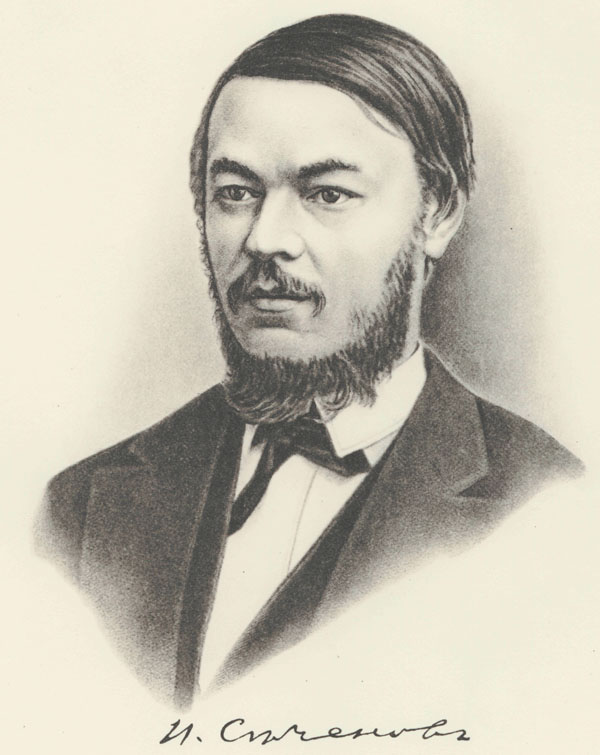
Ivan Sechenov in his youth

Sechenov was born in the village of Tepli Stan, which is now known as Sechenov, Gorky Oblast. He was the son of a nobleman and a peasant. Sechenov was first taught by private tutors, and had mastered both German and French at an early age. By the age of 14, he was admitted to the St. Petersburg Military Engineering School. After his military training, he became interested in medicine, and enrolled in Moscow University, completing his M.D. in 1856. He received the best of Russian education both in basic and clinical sciences. He then pursued higher medical education abroad, and was mentored and influenced by a wide variety of prominent European scientists of his day, including Johannes Müller, Emil DuBois-Reymond, Hermann von Helmholtz, Carl F. W. Ludwig, Robert W. Bunsen, and Heinrich Magnus. Sechenov worked as a professor at the Medical Surgery Academy in Saint Petersburg until 1870.

- 1843–1848, Main Military Engineering School, now Military engineering-technical university (Russian: Военный инженерно-технический университет), in Saint Petersburg
- 1850–1856, studies of medicine at Moscow University
- 1860, M.D. from the Imperial Military Medical Academy of St. Petersburg
- 1860–1870, professor at the Imperial Military Medical Academy. Foundation of the first Russian school of physiology. Sechenov resigned to protest the rejection of Ilya Ilyich Mechnikov (the founder of immunology, the Nobel Prize laureate of 1908)
- 1870, chemical research in Mendeleev's laboratory in St. Petersburg
- 1871–1876, chair at the Novorossiysk University at Odessa (where Mechnikov had been appointed Titular Professor of Zoology and Comparative Anatomy)
- 1876-1888, professor at St. Petersburg University
- 1889, "Sechenov's equation" is introduced (from experimental evidence) for solubility of gases
- 1891–1901, professor at Moscow University
- 1904, elected honorary member of Russian Academy of Sciences

One of Sechenov's primary interests was neurophysiology (the structure of the brain). He demonstrated that brain activity is linked to electric currents, and developed an interest in electrophysiology. Among his discoveries was the cerebral inhibition of spinal reflexes. He also maintained that chemical factors in the environment of the cell are of great importance.

From 1856 to 1862, Sechenov studied and worked in Europe in the laboratories of Müller, Emil du Bois-Reymond, Hermann von Helmholtz in Berlin, Felix Hoppe-Seyler in Leipzig, Ludwig in Vienna, and Claude Bernard in Paris.

Like several other Russian scientists of the period, Sechenov often came into conflict with the tsarist government and conservative colleagues, but he did not emigrate. In 1866, the censorship committee in Saint Petersburg attempted judicial procedures, accusing Sechenov of spreading materialism and of "debasing of Christian morality".

== Impact ==
Sechenov's work was foundational across many fields, including physiology, reflexes, neurology, animal and human behaviour, and neuroscience. He also was noticed by Russian psychologists for his essays in support of an objectivist approach to psychology. Sechenov influenced Pavlov, many Russian physiologists and Vladimir Nikolayevich Myasishchev, when the Institute of Brain and Psychic Activity was set up in 1918.

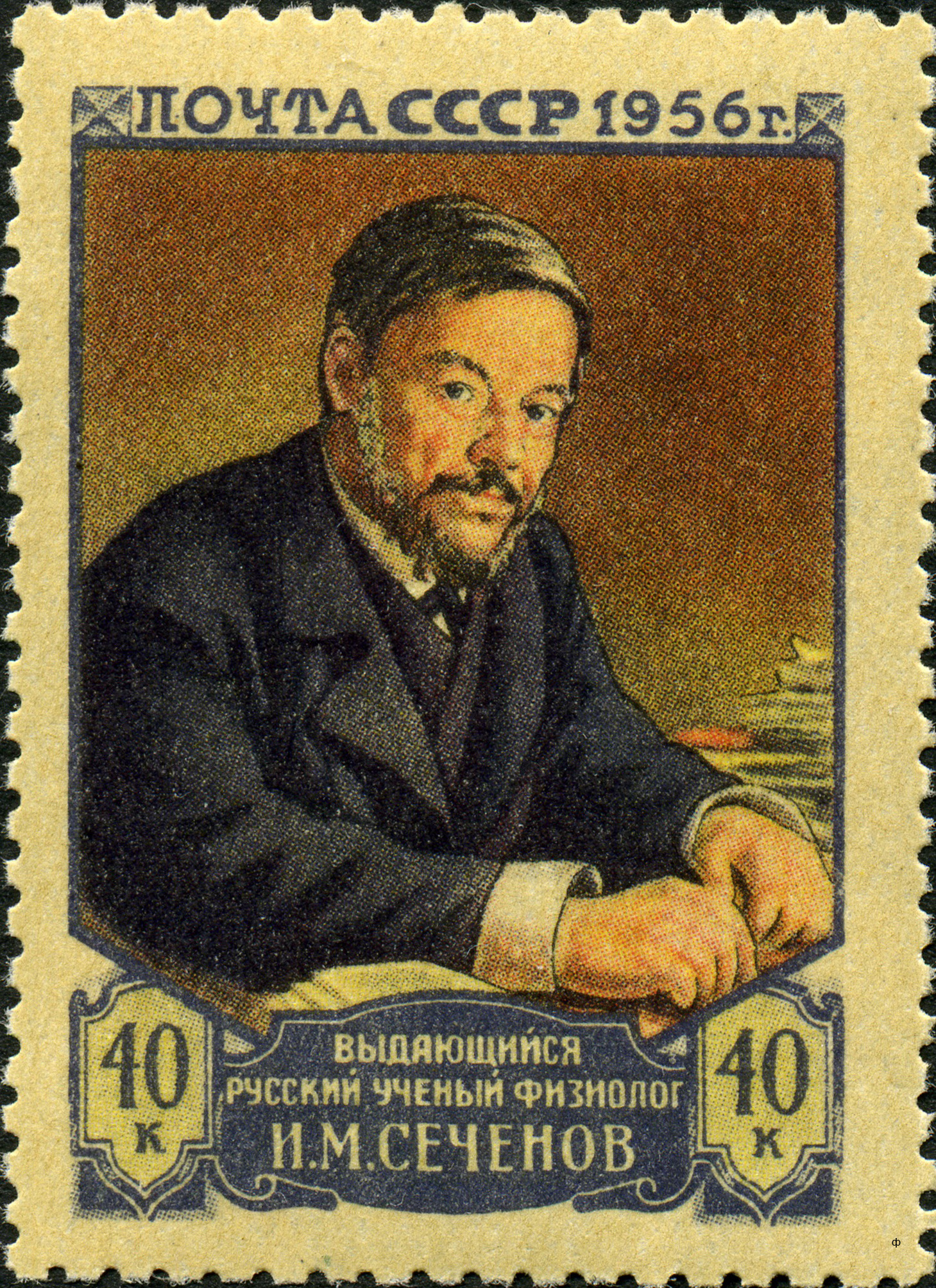
Soviet 1956 commemorative stamp of Ivan Sechenov

For some he was influential to Bekhterev but this may be argued as many schools in psychology and physiology date Bekhterev as a Russian scientist much earlier than Pavlov and Sechenov.

Sechenov also authored the Russian classic, Reflexes of the Brain, which introduced electrophysiology to neurophysiology at laboratories and in medical education.

== Trivia ==
- According to a study conducted in 2015, Sechenov was included in "Russia team on medicine". This list includes fifty-three famous Russian medical scientists from the Russian Federation, the Soviet Union, and the Russian Empire who were born in 1757—1950. Physicians of all specialities listed here. Among them Vladimir Bekhterev, Vladimir Demikhov, Sergei Korsakoff, Ivan Pavlov, Nikolay Pirogov, Victor Skumin.

== Selected works ==
- 1860 "Materials on future of physiology", Материалы для будущей физиологии.. St. Petersburg (Part I "Some facts for the future study of alcohol intoxication", in Russian)
- 1862 "On animal electricity", О животном Электричестве. St. Petersburg (in Russian)
- 1863 "Reflexions of the brain", Рефлексы головного мозга. Medical newspaper, Медицинский вестник 47-48 ("Reflexes of the brain", in Russian)
- 1866 "Physiology of the nervous system", Физиология нервной системы. St. Petersburg (in Russian)
- 1873 "Who should and How to develop Psychology", "Кому и как разрабатывать психологию?." Vestnik Evropy 4 (in Russian)
- 1897 The Physiological Criteria of the Length of the Working Day
- 1900 Participation of the Nervous System in Man's Working Movements
- 1901 Participation of the Senses and Manual dexterity in Sighted and Blind Persons
- 1901 Essay on Man's Working Movements

== Commemoration ==
- 1954 the area around Sechenov's birthplace was renamed Sechenovsky District of Nizhny Novgorod Oblast
- 1955 Moscow Medical Academy was given name of I.M.Sechenov; its campus includes memorial of Sechenov
- 1956 Institute of Evolutionary Physiology in Leningrad was reorganized as a part of USSR Academy of Sciences and named after I.M.Sechenov

== Bibliography ==
- "Сеченов, Иван Михайлович" . Brockhaus and Efron Encyclopedic Dictionary (in Russian). 1906.
- Zusne, Leonard. 1984. Biographical Dictionary of Psychology. Westport, Connecticut: Greenwood Press. ISBN 0-313-24027-2
- Ivan Sechenov at University of Illinois at Chicago, Department of Neurology
- Ivan Sechenov at Max Planck Institute for History - part of "The Virtual Laboratory, Essays and Resources on the Experimentalization of Life"
