= List of sunken battleships =

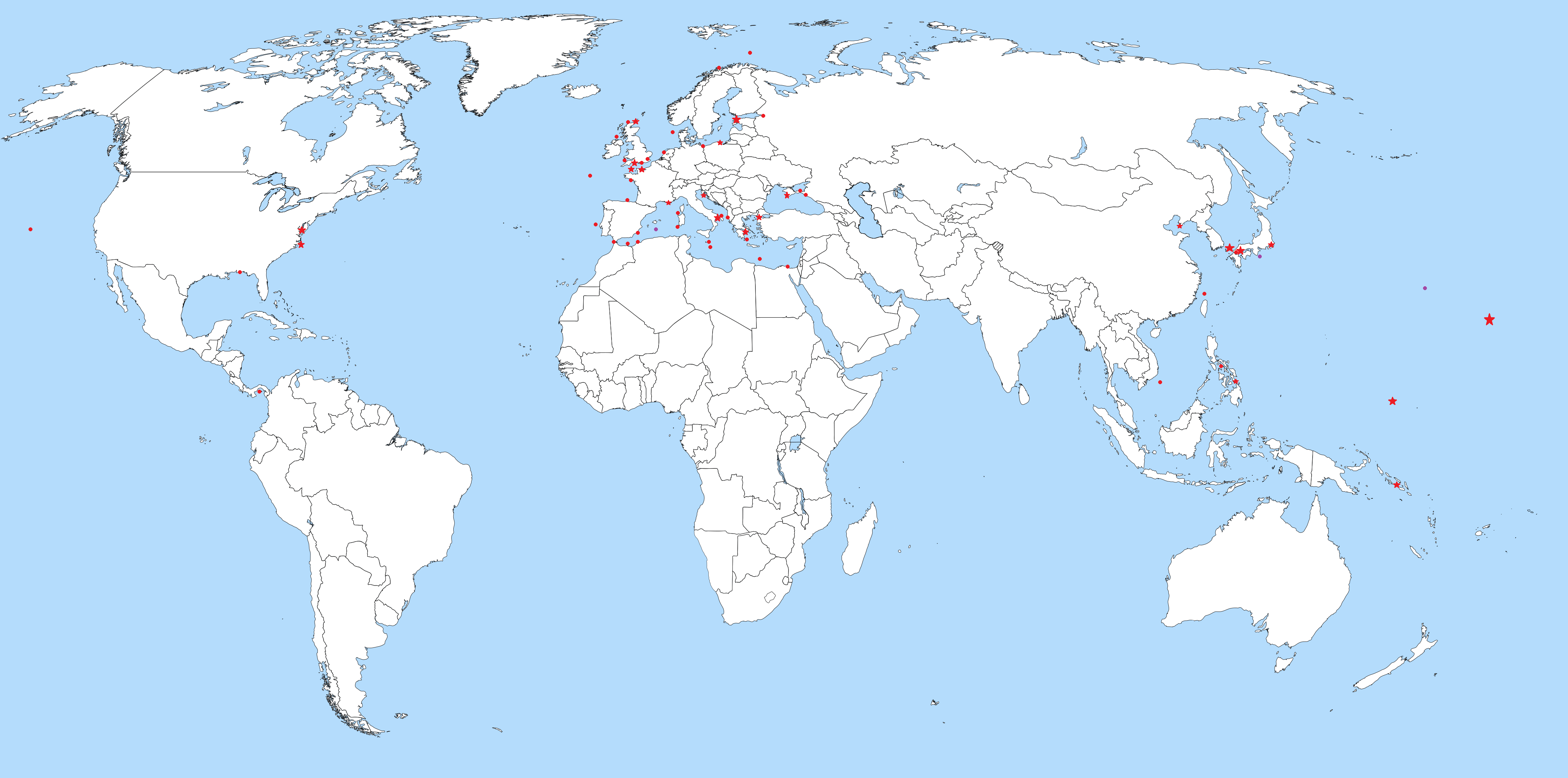
A list of sunken battleships. Red symbols sunken battleships, purple symbols denote battleships sunk as aircraft carriers, and stars denote more than one battleship in an area.

Sunken battleships are the wrecks of large capital ships built from the 1880s to the mid-20th century that were either destroyed in battle, mined, deliberately destroyed in a weapons test, or scuttled. The battleship, as the might of a nation personified in a warship, played a vital role in the prestige, diplomacy, and military strategies of 20th century nations. The importance placed on battleships also meant massive arms races between the great powers of the 20th century such as the United Kingdom, Germany, Japan, United States, France, Italy, Russia, and the Soviet Union.

The term "battleship" first entered common parlance to describe certain types of ironclad warships in the 1880s, now referred to as pre-dreadnoughts. The commissioning and putting to sea of HMS Dreadnought, in part inspired by the results of the Battle of Tsushima in May 1905, marked the dawn of a new era in naval warfare and defining an entire generation of warships: the battleships. This first generation, known as the "Dreadnoughts", came to be built in rapid succession in Europe, the Americas, and Japan with ever more tension growing between the major naval powers. However, despite the enormous sums of money and resources dedicated to the construction and maintenance of the increasing number of battleships in the world, they typically saw little combat. With the exception of the naval battles of the Russo-Japanese War and Jutland, which would be one of the last large-scale battles between capital ships, no decisive naval battles between battleships were fought. When the First World War ended in 1918, much of the German High Seas Fleet was escorted to Scapa Flow, where almost all of the fleet was scuttled to prevent its being divided amongst the victorious Allies. Numerous other battleships were scuttled for similar reasoning.

Between the wars, the Washington Naval Treaty and the subsequent London Naval Treaty limited the tonnage and firepower of capital ships permitted to the navies of the world. The United Kingdom and the United States scrapped many of their aging dreadnoughts, while the Japanese began converting battlecruisers into fast battleships in the 1930s. In 1936, Italy and Japan refused to sign the Second London Naval Treaty and withdrew from the earlier treaties, prompting the United States and the United Kingdom to invoke an escalator clause in the treaty that allowed them to increase the displacement and armament of planned ships. The naval combat of World War II saw many battleships belonging to the various nations destroyed as air power began to be realized as being crucial to naval warfare, rather than massive capital ships. As the battleship began to fall out of favor, some captured capital ships were decommissioned, stripped, and deliberately sunk in nuclear weapons tests.

== Losses ==
Much like battlecruisers, battleships typically sank with large loss of life if and when they were destroyed in battle. The first battleship to be sunk by gunfire alone, the Russian battleship Oslyabya, sank with half of her crew at the Battle of Tsushima when the ship was pummeled by a seemingly endless stream of Japanese shells striking the ship repeatedly, killing crew with direct hits to several guns, the conning tower, and the water line or below it, which became the cause of the ship's sinking. Battleships also proved to be very vulnerable to mines, as was evidenced in the Russo-Japanese War and both World Wars. After the Battle of Port Arthur, a number of Russian and Japanese vessels were struck by mines and either sank or were scuttled to prevent their capture. A decade later, the Marine Nationale and Royal Navy lost three battleships, HMS Irresistible, HMS Ocean, and Bouvet, to Turkish mines in the waters of the Dardanelles. Torpedoes were also very capable of sinking battleships. On 21 November 1944, USS Sealion sank Kongō with over 1200 casualties. HMS Barham was struck by three torpedoes fired from German submarine U-331. (Note: U-331's captain, Oberleutnant zur See Hans-Diedrich von Tiesenhausen, believed that only one of his torpedoes struck Barham. von Tiesenhausen was awarded the Knight's Cross of the Iron Cross for this action.) Barham could not make an attempt to dodge the incoming torpedoes and sank with 862 fatalities as a result of several magazine explosions that occurred after she had initially been hit by U-331's torpedoes.

Although mines and torpedoes constantly threatened the battleship's dominance, it was the refinement of aerial technology and tactics that led to the replacement of the battleship with the aircraft carrier as the most important naval vessel. Initially, the large scale use of aircraft in naval combat was underrated and the idea that they could destroy battleships was dismissed. Still, the United States and the Japanese Empire experimented with offensive roles for aircraft carriers in their fleets. One pioneer of aviation in a naval role was US Army General Billy Mitchell, who commandeered SMS Ostfriesland for testing of his theory in July 1921. Though these tests did not impress his contemporaries, they forced the US Navy to begin diverting some of its budget towards researching the matter further. The belief that the aircraft carrier was junior to the battleship began to evaporate when the Imperial Japanese Navy, in a surprise attack, nearly destroyed the United States Pacific Fleet while it was at anchor at Pearl Harbor on 7 December 1941. The captain of the Bismarck, Ernst Lindemann, had almost dodged the Royal Navy until he was undone by British reconnaissance aircraft. Although almost every sea battle in World War II involved gunfire between surface warships to some degree, their time as the senior ship of a nation's fleet had run its course.

Those battleships belonging to the Central Powers that survived World War I often did not survive its aftermath. The German High Seas Fleet was scuttled at Scapa Flow by its sailors in June 1919 following their surrender and internment the previous November. On 1 November 1918, as the Austrian battleship Viribus Unitis was being transferred to the State of Slovenes, Croats and Serbs, she was mined and sunk at Pola by two Italian frogmen, Raffaele Paolucci and Raffaele Rossetti, who were unaware of the transfer. On 27 November 1942 the Vichy French government scuttled the majority of the French fleet at Toulon.

=== Sunk in combat ===
Name	Navy	Casualties	Date sunk	Location	Condition	Relics	Image
Poltava (Note: Poltava was sunk by Japanese artillery 5 December 1904 during the Siege of Port Arthur, then she was captured, refloated, given the Japanese name Tango, and refitted. She was sold back to the Russian Empire during World War I and renamed Chesma.)	Imperial Russian Navy	—	5 December 1904	Port Arthur	Scrapped	—	
Pobeda (Note: Pobeda, like Poltava, was sunk by Japanese artillery at the Siege of Port Arthur on 7 December 1904, but was refloated by the Japanese and given the name Suwo, and also refitted.)	Imperial Russian Navy	—	7 December 1904	Port Arthur	Scrapped	—	
Oslyabya	Imperial Russian Navy	470–514 killed (Note: McLaughlin gives a death toll of 470 men, while Campbell gives 514. Neither Forczyk nor McLaughlin give numbers for the amount of sailors rescued, but Campbell states that 385 men were saved by Russian destroyers.)	27 May 1905	Tsushima Strait	Unknown	—	
Imperator Aleksandr III	Imperial Russian Navy	Lost with all hands	27 May 1905	Tsushima Strait	Unknown	—	
Borodino	Imperial Russian Navy	854 killed, 1 captured	27 May 1905	Tsushima Strait	Unknown	—	
Knyaz Suvorov	Imperial Russian Navy	908 killed, 20 captured	27 May 1905	Tsushima Strait	Unknown	—	
Navarin	Imperial Russian Navy	741 killed, 1 captured	28 May 1905	Tsushima Strait	Unknown	—	
Sissoi Veliky	Imperial Russian Navy	47 killed, 613 captured	28 May 1905	Tsushima Strait	Unknown	—	
HMS Formidable	Royal Navy	547 killed	1 January 1915	50°13′N 3°4′W Off Portland Bill, English Channel	Unknown	—	
HMS Irresistible	Royal Navy	150 killed	18 March 1915	Dardanelles	Unknown	—	
HMS Goliath	Royal Navy	570 killed	13 May 1915	Dardanelles	Unknown	—	
HMS Triumph (Note: Originally, Triumph was built for the Chilean Navy and christened Libertad, or Liberty.)	Royal Navy	78 killed	25 May 1915	Near Gaba Tepe, Gallipoli Peninsula	Unknown	—	
HMS Majestic	Royal Navy	40–49 killed (Note: R. A. Burt's British Battleships 1889–1904 states 49 men died in HMS Majestic's sinking, while according to Conway's All the World's Fighting Ships 1906–1921, only 40 men were killed.)	27 May 1915	40°02′30″N 26°11′02″E Cape Helles, Gallipoli Peninsula	Unknown	—	
Barbaros Hayreddin (Note: SMS Kurfürst Friedrich Wilhelm was sold to the Ottoman Empire in 1910, and she was renamed Barbaros Hayreddin.)	Ottoman Navy	258 killed	8 August 1915	Dardanelles	Unknown	—	
SMS Pommern	Imperial German Navy	Lost with all hands	1 June 1916	North Sea	Unknown	—	
Suffren	French Navy	Lost with all hands	26 November 1916	39°10′N 10°48′W Off Lisbon, Portugal	Unknown	—	
Gaulois	French Navy	Four killed	27 December 1916	36°15′N 23°42′E Off Cape Maleas, Aegean Sea	Unknown	—	
HMS Cornwallis	Royal Navy	15 killed	9 January 1917	35°06′N 15°11′E Off Malta	Unknown	—	
Danton	French Navy	296 killed	19 March 1917	38°45′35″N 8°3′30″E Mediterranean Sea	Upright under 1,000 meters (3,300 ft) of water.	—	
SMS Szent István	Austro-Hungarian Navy	89 killed	10 June 1918	44°12′07″N 14°27′05″E Premuda, Adriatic Sea	Capsized under 66 meters (217 ft) of water.	—	
SMS Viribus Unitis	Austro-Hungarian Navy	300 killed	1 November 1918	44°52′9″N 13°49′9″E Pula, Croatia	Unknown	—	
HMS Britannia	Royal Navy	50 killed, 80 injured	9 November 1918	35°53′N 5°53′W Off Cape Trafalgar, Strait of Gibraltar	Unknown	—	
HMS Royal Oak	Royal Navy	833 killed	14 October 1939	58°55′N 2°59′W Scapa Flow	Capsized under 33 meters (108 ft) of water.	Royal Oak's bell is the centerpiece to a memorial to those who died aboard Royal Oak at St Magnus' Cathedral in Kirkwall.	
Bretagne	French Navy	977 killed	3 July 1940	Mers-el-Kébir, Algeria	Scrapped	—	
Kilkis (Note: Prior to her service in the Hellenic Navy, Kilkis was the American battleship USS Mississippi.)	Royal Hellenic Navy	—	23 April 1941	Salamis Naval Base, near Salamis	Scrapped	—	
Lemnos (Note: Before being purchased by the Greek government and renamed, Lemnos was the American battleship USS Idaho.)	Royal Hellenic Navy	—	23 April 1941	Salamis Naval Base, near Salamis	Scrapped	—	
Bismarck	Kriegsmarine	2086 killed, 115 captured.	27 May 1941	48°10′N 16°12′W 650 kilometers (400 mi) from Brest, North Atlantic	Bismarck was found in great condition. She sank after being heavily bombarded by British ships. Bismarck sank stern first in her plunge to the ocean floor. Her bridge and stern ripped away as she spiraled downwards, and as she settled on the side of an extinct underwater volcano, the down blast from all the water she displaced hit her and caused her to slide down the volcano on a water avalanche of sorts. Soon a mud slide occurred due to the shifting of the soil caused by the massive ship and it began to carry her down. She finally settled upright under 4,791 meters (15,719 ft) of water. She slid half a mile.	—	
Marat (Note: Formerly known as Petropavlovsk, later renamed to Marat, after the French revolutionary Jean-Paul Marat, and later to Volkhov.)	Soviet Navy	326 killed	23 September 1941	Leningrad	Scrapped	—	
HMS Barham	Royal Navy	862 killed	25 November 1941	32°34′N 26°24′E Off Egypt	Unknown	—	
USS Arizona	United States Navy	1177 killed	7 December 1941	21°21′53″N 157°57′0″W Pearl Harbor	Heavily damaged as a result of the attack on Pearl Harbor. After being struck off the Naval Vessel Register on 1 December 1942, Arizona was found to be in such terrible condition that she could not be made serviceable again even after salvaging. Arizona's surviving superstructure was removed in 1942, followed by her main armament over the next year and a half.	The amidships section had served as a ceremonial platform on the wreck but was cut away to make room for today's overlying memorial. One of the ship's bells is at the University of Arizona, an anchor and a restored gun barrel is located at the Wesley Bolin Memorial Plaza, and several of her guns were later used aboard USS Nevada. Other artifacts from the ship, such as items from the ship's silver service, are on permanent exhibit in the Arizona State Capitol Museum.	
USS Utah	United States Navy	64 killed	7 December 1941	21°22′7″N 157°57′44″W Pearl Harbor	Utah capsized during the attack, and was partially salvaged but not recovered. Utah's wreck is almost completely submerged, with a small amount of highly corroded superstructure visible above the surface.	In 1972, a memorial consisting of a 70 ft (21 m) walkway from nearby Ford Island that terminates in a platform with a flagpole and a plaque. Other relics of the Utah are preserved at the Utah State Capitol and are regularly on display.	
HMS Prince of Wales	Royal Navy	327 killed	10 December 1941	3°33′36″N 104°28′42″E South China Sea	Capsized under 71 meters (233 ft) of water. Reported to have been heavily salvaged.	Prince of Wales bell was recovered, restored, and displayed in the Merseyside Maritime Museum in Liverpool.	
Asahi	Imperial Japanese Navy	16 killed	25 May 1942	10°N 110°E 100 miles (160 km) from Cape Paderan, Vietnam	Unknown	—	
Hiei	Imperial Japanese Navy	188 killed	13 November 1942	9°N 159°E Off Guadalcanal	Capsized under 900 meters (3,000 ft) of water.	—	
Kirishima	Imperial Japanese Navy	212 killed	15 November 1942	Off Guadalcanal	Capsized under 1,100 meters (3,600 ft) of water.	—	
Roma	Regia Marina	1393 killed	9 September 1943	41°9′28″N 8°17′35″E 30 kilometers (19 mi) north of Sardinia	Capsized and blown in half under 1,000 meters (3,300 ft).	—	
Scharnhorst	Kriegsmarine	1932 killed, 36 captured	26 December 1943	72°16′N 28°41′E near the Norwegian North Cape	Capsized under 290 meters (950 ft).	—	
Strasbourg	French Navy	—	18 August 1944	Bay of Lazaret	Scrapped	—	
Jean Bart (Note: In 1936, Jean Bart was renamed the Océan to free the name up for the Richelieu-class battleship of the same name, then under construction.)	French Navy	—	28 August 1944	Toulon, France	Scrapped	—	
Musashi	Imperial Japanese Navy	1023 killed	24 October 1944	13°7′N 122°32′E Sibuyan Sea	Heavily damaged and in multiple pieces under 1,000 meters (3,300 ft) of water.	—	
Fusō	Imperial Japanese Navy	1620 killed	25 October 1944	Surigao Strait	Capsized 185 meters (607 ft) of water with pagoda mast snapped off.	—	
Yamashiro	Imperial Japanese Navy	1626 killed	25 October 1944	Surigao Strait	Capsized in 191 meters (627 ft) of water with bow folded back over the keel of the rest of the hull, and engine room collapsed.	—	
Tirpitz	Kriegsmarine	950–1204 killed (Note: Ranges for casualties aboard the Tirpitz range wildly. William Garzke and Robert Dulin place fatalities at "about 950"; Siegfried Breyer and Erich Gröner give a sum of 1204 deaths; Niklas Zetterling and Michael Tamelander estimated nearly 1000 fatalities; and John Sweetman gives 1000 out of a crew of 1900 as lost with the Tirpitz.)	12 November 1944	69°38′50″N 18°48′30″E Håkøybotn Bay, Norway	Somewhat salvaged after the Second World War.	—	
Kongō	Imperial Japanese Navy	1250 killed	21 November 1944	26°9′N 121°23′E Taiwan Strait	Unknown	—	
Conte di Cavour	Regia Marina	—	23 February 1945	Taranto Harbor	Scrapped	—	
Yamato	Imperial Japanese Navy	3055 killed	7 April 1945	30°22′N 128°4′E East China Sea	Broken in half under 340 meters (1,120 ft) of water.	—	
Haruna	Imperial Japanese Navy	65 killed	24 July 1945	Kure, Japan	Scrapped	—	
Settsu	Imperial Japanese Navy	—	29 July 1945	Kure, Japan	Scrapped	—	
Ise	Imperial Japanese Navy	50 killed	28 July 1945	Kure, Japan	Scrapped	—	
Hyūga	Imperial Japanese Navy	200+ killed	1 August 1945	34°10′N 132°33′E Kure, Japan	Scrapped	—	

=== Converted battleships ===
Name	Navy	Casualties	Date sunk	Location	Condition	Image
Kaga	Imperial Japanese Navy	811 killed	4 June 1942	30°23′N 179°17′W	Unknown	
HMS Eagle	Royal Navy	131 killed	11 August 1942	38°3′0″N 3°1′12″E near Mallorca	Unknown	
Shinano	Imperial Japanese Navy	1435 killed	29 November 1944	32°7′N 137°4′E 105 kilometers (65 mi) south of mainland Japan.	Unknown	

=== Lost at sea ===
Name	Navy	Casualties	Date sunk	Location	Condition	Image
Petropavlovsk	Imperial Russian Navy	679 killed	13 April 1904	Yellow Sea	Unknown	
Hatsuse	Imperial Japanese Navy	496 killed	15 May 1904	38°37′N 121°20′E Yellow Sea	Unknown	
Yashima	Imperial Japanese Navy	—	15 May 1904	38°34′N 121°40′E Yellow Sea	Unknown	
HMS Montagu	Royal Navy	—	30 May 1906	Lundy Island, England	Almost entirely salvaged.	
Iéna	French Navy	120 killed	12 March 1907	Toulon, France	Scrapped	
Liberté	French Navy	250 killed	25 September 1911	Toulon, France	Scrapped	
HMS Audacious	Royal Navy	One killed	27 October 1914	55°32′16″N 7°24′33″W 39 kilometers (24 mi) of Tory Island	Capsized under 64 meters (210 ft) of water.	
HMS Bulwark	Royal Navy	736 killed	26 November 1914	51°25′N 0°39′E Off Sheerness, England	Unknown	
HMS Ocean	Royal Navy	Unknown	18 March 1915	Dardanelles	Unknown	
Bouvet	French Navy	639 killed	18 March 1915	40°01′15″N 26°16′30″E Dardanelles	Unknown	
Benedetto Brin	Regia Marina	454 killed	27 September 1915	Brindisi, Italy	Unknown	
HMS King Edward VII	Royal Navy	—	6 January 1916	Off Cape Wrath, Scotland.	Capsized under 108 meters (354 ft) of water.	
HMS Russell	Royal Navy	125 killed	27 April 1916	35°54′N 14°36′E Off Valletta, Malta	Capsized under 110 meters (360 ft) of water.	
Leonardo da Vinci	Regia Marina	448 killed	2 August 1916	Taranto, Italy	Scrapped	
Imperatritsa Mariya	Imperial Russian Navy	228 killed	20 October 1916	Sevastopol, Ukraine	Scrapped	
Regina Margherita	Regia Marina	675 killed	12 December 1916	Off Valona, Albania	Laying on her starboard side under 68 meters (223 ft).	
Peresvet (Note: The ship launched as Peresvet and was scuttled by the Russian Empire at the Siege of Port Arthur on 7 December 1904, but was raised and put to sea again by the Japanese and christened the Sagami. The Japanese then sold the ship back to the Russians, who gave her the name Chesma.)	Imperial Russian Navy	116–167 killed (Note: Antony Preston gives the death toll of the ship's second (and final) sinking at 167 while McLaughlin, in Russian & Soviet Battleships, gives a more modest 116 fatalities.)	4 January 1917	Off Port Said, Egypt	Unknown	
HMS Vanguard	Royal Navy	843 killed	9 July 1917	58°51′24″N 3°6′22″W Scapa Flow	Unknown, rests under 14.2 meters (47 ft) of water.	
Kawachi	Imperial Japanese Navy	600–700 killed (Note: The number of casualties that resulted from the explosion of the Kawachi are high, they are disputed amongst the sources provided. Hans Lengerer's journal Battleships Kawachi and Settsu says that 600 men died, and Sander Kingsepp tacks on an additional 18 fatalities. Gardiner and Gray and Jentschura, Jung and Mickel, however, agree on a figure of 700 killed.)	2 July 1918	34°0′N 131°36′E	Partially salvaged.	
HMS Prince George (Note: Sometime in mid-1918, Prince George was renamed Victoria II, after her sister ship HMS Victorious, but her name reverted to Prince George in February 1919.)	Royal Navy	—	30 December 1921	52°44′5″N 4°38′23″E Off Camperduin, the Netherlands	Upright and visible from shore, partially scrapped.	
France	French Navy	Three killed	26 August 1922	47°27′6″N 3°2′0″W Quiberon Bay, France	Unknown	
España	Spanish Navy	—	26 August 1923	Cape Tres Forcas, Morocco	Somewhat salvaged, including a 305 mm (12.0 in) and a 102 mm (4.0 in) gun, but mostly destroyed by severe storms.	
Alfonso XIII (Note: The Alonso XIII was renamed the España, the name of her sister ship, which had foundered in 1923, after the unpopular king of Spain had been exiled.)	Spanish Navy	Five killed	30 April 1937	43°31′26″N 3°40′44″W Off Santander, Spain	Unknown	
Jaime I	Spanish Republican Navy	—	17 June 1937	Cartagena, Spain	Scrapped	
Ilmarinen	Finnish Navy	271 killed	13 September 1941	Gulf of Finland	Capsized upside down under 80 meters (262 ft), declared as a war grave.	
Mutsu	Imperial Japanese Navy	1121 killed	8 June 1943	33°58′N 132°24′E Seto Inland Sea	Due to salvaging efforts that ceased in the 1990s, the only major piece of the wreckage that remains is a 35-meter (115 ft) stretch of the hull from the bridge to turret No. 1 at a depth of about 12 meters (39 ft).	
Schlesien	Kriegsmarine	—	3 May 1945	Off Zinnowitz, Germany	Scrapped	
USS Oklahoma	United States Navy	—	17 May 1947	Unknown, northeast of Hawaii	Capsized in Pearl Harbor Attack. Salvaged.	
São Paulo	Brazilian Navy	—	November 1951	Unknown	Unknown	
Novorossiysk (Note: Former Italian battleship Giulio Cesare given to the Soviet Union after World War II.)	Soviet Navy	608 killed	29 October 1955	44°37′7″N 33°32′8″E Sevastopol, Ukraine	Scrapped	

=== Scuttled battleships ===
Location	Condition	Relics	Image			
Sevastopol	Imperial Russian Navy	11 killed	2 January 1905	Port Arthur	Unknown	—
HMS Hood	Royal Navy	—	4 November 1914	50°34′9″N 2°25′16″W Portland Harbour	—	—
Masséna	French Navy	—	9 November 1915	Cape Helles, Gallipoli	Unknown	—
Slava	Imperial Russian Navy	Three killed	17 October 1917	Moon Sound, Estonia	Scrapped	—
Imperatritsa Ekaterina Velikaya (Note: Imperatritsa Ekaterina Velikaya was laid down as Ekaterina II, but this was only a formality. Later, she was renamed Svobodnaya Rossiya (Russian: Free Russia) by February Revolutionists.)	Imperial Russian Navy	—	18 June 1918	44°42′23″N 37°48′43″E Novorossiysk, Russia	Unknown	—
SMS König	Imperial German Navy	—	21 June 1919	Gutter Sound, Scapa Flow	Capsized under about 35 meters (115 ft) of water. Somewhat damaged by metal scavenging.	—
Kronprinz Wilhelm	Imperial German Navy	One killed	21 June 1919	Gutter Sound, Scapa Flow	Capsized under about 45 meters (148 ft) of water.	—
SMS Markgraf	Imperial German Navy	Two killed	21 June 1919	Gutter Sound, Scapa Flow	Capsized under about 45 meters (148 ft) of water.	—
SMS Kaiser	Imperial German Navy	—	21 June 1919	Gutter Sound, Scapa Flow	Scrapped	—
SMS Friedrich der Grosse	Imperial German Navy	—	21 June 1919	Gutter Sound, Scapa Flow	Scrapped	Friedrich der Grosse's bell was returned to the Federal Republic of Germany and today is on display at the German Navy sea base at Glücksburg.
SMS Kaiserin	Imperial German Navy	—	21 June 1919	Gutter Sound, Scapa Flow	Scrapped	—
SMS Prinzregent Luitpold	Imperial German Navy	—	21 June 1919	Gutter Sound, Scapa Flow	Scrapped	—
SMS König Albert	Imperial German Navy	—	21 June 1919	Gutter Sound, Scapa Flow	Scrapped	—
SMS Grosser Kurfürst	Imperial German Navy	—	21 June 1919	Gutter Sound, Scapa Flow	Scrapped	Grosser Kurfürst's bell was purchased at auction by the National Museum of the Royal Navy, Portsmouth, Hampshire.
SMS Bayern	Imperial German Navy	—	21 June 1919	Gutter Sound, Scapa Flow	Scrapped	Bayern's bell is on display at the Kiel Fördeklub.
Rostislav	Imperial Russian Navy	—	November 1920	45°25′0″N 36°37′43″E Strait of Kerch	Partially salvaged, reported to be extant albeit sinking into silt.	—
Dunkerque	French Navy	—	27 November 1942	Toulon, France	Scrapped	—
Provence	French Navy		27 November 1942	Toulon, France	Scrapped	—
HMS Centurion	Royal Navy	—	9 June 1944	Off Normandy	Unknown	HMS Centurion's badge is on display at Shugborough Hall.
Courbet	French Navy	—	9 June 1944	Off Sword Beach, Normandy	Scrapped	—
Schleswig-Holstein	Kriegsmarine	—	21 March 1945	Off Osmussaar, Gulf of Finland	Wreckage buried in 1966.	Schleswig-Holstein's bell is on display in the Military History Museum of the Bundeswehr in Dresden as of 1990.
Gneisenau	Kriegsmarine	—	27 March 1945	Gotenhafen (Gdynia), Poland	Scrapped	Her aft main turret was removed and placed at Austrått Fort, near Trondheim, as the coastal gun "Orlandert."
Zähringen	Kriegsmarine	—	26 March 1945	Gotenhafen (Gdynia), Poland	Scrapped	—

=== Expended as targets ===
Name	Navy	Date sunk	Location	Condition	Image
USS Texas (Note: USS Texas was renamed the San Marcos 15 February 1911 to free the name for USS Texas.)	United States Navy	22 March 1912	37°43′10″N 76°05′0″W Tangier Sound, Chesapeake Bay	Remains demolished and buried	
HMS Empress of India	Royal Navy	4 November 1913	Lyme Bay	Capsized under about 32 meters (105 ft) of water.	
Iki (Note: Formerly Russian battleship Imperator Nikolai I and was renamed Iki on 6 June 1905.)	Imperial Japanese Navy	3 October 1915	Unknown	Unknown	
USS Indiana	United States Navy	1 November 1920	Chesapeake Bay	Scrapped	
USS Massachusetts	United States Navy	January 1921	Off Pensacola, Florida	Sunk as an artificial reef	
SMS Ostfriesland	Imperial German Navy	21 July 1921	37°9′8″N 74°34′3″W Chesapeake Bay	Lying upside down under 370 feet of water.	
SMS Baden	Imperial German Navy	16 August 1921	49°49′42″N 2°23′21″W Hurd Deep, English Channel	Unknown, under 180 meters (590 ft) of water.	
USS Alabama	United States Navy	27 September 1921	Chesapeake Bay	Scrapped	
SMS Prinz Eugen	Austro-Hungarian Navy	June 1922	Near Toulon	Unknown	
USS Iowa (Note: On 30 April 1919, the Iowa was renamed Coast Battleship No. 4 to free her name for one of the six new South Dakota-class battleships, which would be abandoned.)	United States Navy	23 March 1923	Gulf of Panama	Unknown	
USS New Jersey	United States Navy	5 September 1923	Diamond Shoals, Cape Hatteras	Upside down in 320 feet of water.	
USS Virginia	United States Navy	5 September 1923	Diamond Shoals, Cape Hatteras	Upside down under 385 feet of water.	
Hizen (Note: After being raised and put into Japanese service, the former Russian Retvizan was renamed the Hizen.)	Imperial Japanese Navy	25 July 1924	Bungo Channel	Unknown	
Iwami (Note: After being captured by the Japanese, the former Russian Oryol was given the name Iwami.)	Imperial Japanese Navy	10 July 1924	Off Jōgashima, Tokyo Bay	Unknown	
Aki	Imperial Japanese Navy	2 September 1924	35°1′30″N 139°51′22″E Tokyo Bay	Unknown	
Satsuma	Imperial Japanese Navy	7 September 1924	Bōsō Peninsula, Tokyo Bay	Unknown	
HMS Monarch	Royal Navy	21 January 1925	Hurd's Deep	Unknown	
HMS Emperor of India	Royal Navy	6 June 1931	Owers Bank	Scrapped	
USS Arkansas	United States Navy	25 July 1946	Bikini Atoll	Capsized under 180 feet (55 m) of water. Participated in Operation Crossroads.	
Nagato	Imperial Japanese Navy	30 July 1946	Bikini Atoll	Capsized under 33.5 meters (110 ft) of water. Participated in Operation Crossroads.	
USS Pennsylvania	United States Navy	10 February 1948	Off Kwajalein Atoll	Participated in Operation Crossroads	
USS New York	United States Navy	8 July 1948	Pacific Ocean	Participated in Operation Crossroads	
USS Nevada	United States Navy	31 July 1948	About 60–65 miles (97–105 km) off Pearl Harbor	Participated in Operation Crossroads, but was sunk by naval aircraft.	

== See also ==
- List of sunken battlecruisers
- List of sunken aircraft carriers
- List of sunken nuclear submarines
