= List of sunken battlecruisers =

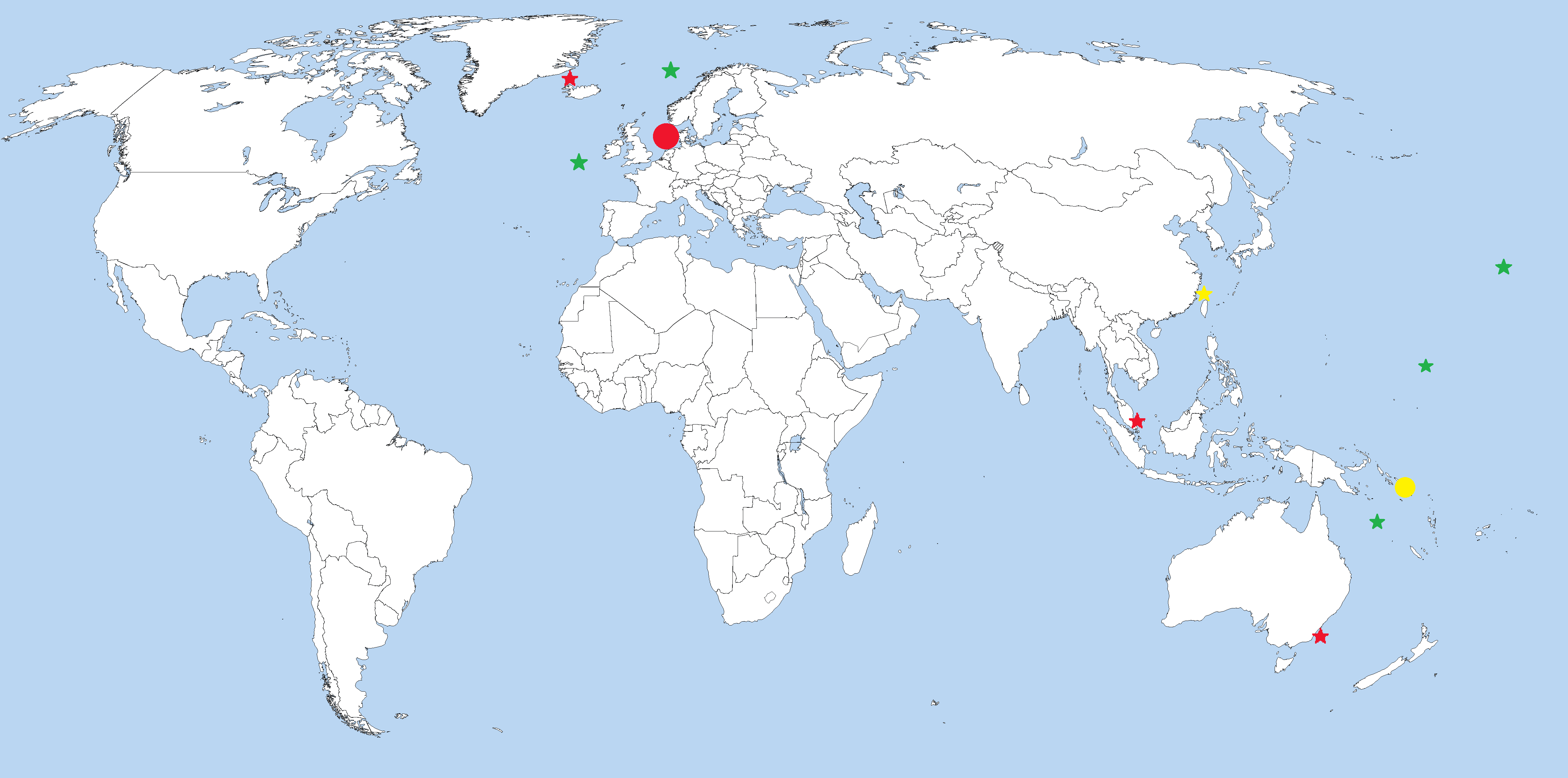
The location of sunken battlecruisers: * Red (red) symbols denote sunken battlecruisers. * Green (green) symbols denote battlecruisers converted into aircraft carriers and thereafter sunk. * Yellow (yellow) symbols denote battlecruisers converted into fast battleships and thereafter sunk.

Sunken battlecruisers are large capital ships built in the first half of the 20th century that were either destroyed in battle, scuttled, or destroyed in a weapon test. They were similar in size and cost to a battleship, and typically carried the same kind of heavy guns, but battlecruisers generally carried less armor and were faster. The first battlecruisers (Note: The German Scharnhorst-class battleships and Deutschland-class cruisers and the French Dunkerque-class battleships are all sometimes referred to as battlecruisers, although the owning navies referred to them as "battleships" (German: Schlachtschiffe), "armored ships" (German: Panzerschiffe) and "battleships" (French: Bâtiments de ligne) respectively. Since neither their operators nor a significant number of naval historians classify them as such, they are not discussed in this article.) were developed in the United Kingdom in the first decade of the century, as a development of the armored cruiser, at the same time the dreadnought succeeded the pre-dreadnought battleship. The original aim of the battlecruiser was to hunt down slower, older armored cruisers and destroy them with heavy gunfire. However, as more and more battlecruisers were built, their opponents became ships of their own type, not slower, weaker vessels.

In World War I, the thin armor of British battlecruisers did not serve them well in combat with their better-armored German counterparts and three were lost at the Battle of Jutland in 1916. SMS Lützow, a German battlecruiser, was also sunk during the battle. Five German battlecruisers were scuttled by their crews in 1919 to prevent their seizure by the Royal Navy after the First Armistice at Compiègne in 1918.

Between the World Wars, the Washington Naval Treaty of 1922 limited the number and tonnage of capital ships that could be retained. Many battlecruisers were scrapped during this period, though HMAS Australia, the sole Australian battlecruiser, was scuttled to comply with the treaty. One provision of the treaty allowed nations to convert two battlecruisers then under construction into aircraft carriers and both the Empire of Japan and the United States took advantage of the opportunity. The British also converted all three of their "light battlecruisers" into aircraft carriers even though they were not subject to the treaty. The Japanese rebuilt their four remaining battlecruisers into fast battleships during the 1930s.

World War II took a heavy toll on the remaining battlecruisers, both converted and unconverted. In contrast to World War I, where all four ships were lost to gunfire, only two were sunk solely by guns. Two battlecruisers were sunk by a combination of gunfire and aerial attack, four were sunk solely by aircraft and two were sunk by submarines. The largest loss of life in the sinking of a battlecruiser was the 1,415 killed in the sinking of HMS Hood during her confrontation with the German battleship Bismarck in 1941. Of the three surviving World War II battlecruisers, two were scrapped after the war and one, USS Saratoga, was sunk by nuclear weapon tests in 1946.

== Losses ==
The first combat losses of battlecruisers occurred during World War I, as a result of the Battle of Jutland between the Royal Navy and the Imperial German Navy on 31 May 1916. The three British ships—Invincible, Indefatigable, and Queen Mary—were all sunk by magazine explosions, with heavy loss of life. SMS Lützow had been hit several times below the waterline by British shells during the battle and took on a lot of water after the battle. Later that night, Lützow had so much water aboard that she threatened to capsize; the crew was ordered to abandon ship and a German destroyer finished her off with two torpedoes. The next combat losses were a quarter century later during World War II, when the British intercepted a German force attempting to break out into the Atlantic to attack supply convoys. Shortly after the Battle of the Denmark Strait began on 24 May 1941, a shell from the German battleship Bismarck hit Hood, causing its magazine to explode with massive loss of life. Six months later, the battleship Prince of Wales and the battlecruiser Repulse attempted to intercept Japanese troop convoys approaching the Malay Peninsula. They were spotted by Japanese aircraft en route and sunk by torpedo bombers on 10 December.

Several battlecruisers survived World War I only to be scuttled in its aftermath. The five German battlecruisers that survived World War I—Von der Tann, Moltke, Seydlitz, Derfflinger, Hindenburg—were interned at Scapa Flow pending the signing of a peace treaty between Germany and the Allies. The commander of the German ships in Scapa, Rear Admiral Ludwig von Reuter, thought the British were going to seize the ships immediately after the expiration of the Armistice, and preemptively ordered the ships be scuttled on the morning of 21 June 1919 to keep them out of British hands. The Royal Australian Navy scuttled Australia in 1924 to comply with the terms of the Washington Naval Treaty.

Half a dozen of the surviving battlecruisers (including three under construction) were converted into aircraft carriers during the 1920s. All three of the Courageous-class battlecruisers were converted. Courageous's aircraft were hunting for submarines shortly after the beginning of World War II when she was sunk by the German submarine U-29 on 17 September 1939. The following year, Glorious was returning to Britain when she was sunk by the German battleships Scharnhorst and Gneisenau in the North Sea on 8 June 1940. A clause in the Washington Naval Treaty allowed two ships per signatory to be converted to aircraft carriers, and the United States Navy chose to convert two of its Lexington-class battlecruisers during the 1920s because of their high speed. Lexington was hit by two bombs and two torpedoes during the Battle of the Coral Sea on 8 May 1942. They only moderately damaged the ship, but, more importantly, they cracked some of her avgas storage tanks. Fumes from these tanks later caught fire and could not be put out; the crew was forced to abandon ship and Lexington was torpedoed and sunk by an American destroyer. Saratoga survived the war, but was considered obsolete so she was used as a target for nuclear weapon tests during Operation Crossroads. The ship survived the first test with little damage, but was sunk by the second test on 25 July 1946. The Japanese aircraft carrier Akagi was another battlecruiser converted into a carrier because of the Washington Naval Treaty. She was struck by three bombs during the Battle of Midway on 4 June 1942 that caused serious fires that forced the crew to abandon ship early that night. By the following morning, it was clear that the ship could not be repaired, and so was torpedoed and sunk.

The four Japanese Kongō-class battlecruisers were reconstructed as fast battleships during the 1930s. On 13 November 1942, during the First Naval Battle of Guadalcanal, Hiei stumbled across American cruisers and destroyers at point-blank range. The ship was badly damaged in the encounter and had to be towed by her sister ship Kirishima. Both were spotted by American aircraft the following morning and Kirishima was forced to cast off her tow because of repeated aerial attacks. Hiei's captain ordered her crew to abandon ship after further damage and scuttled Hiei in the early evening of 14 November. On the night of 14/15 November during the Second Naval Battle of Guadalcanal, Kirishima returned to Ironbottom Sound, but encountered the American battleships South Dakota and Washington. While failing to detect Washington, Kirishima engaged South Dakota with some effect. Washington opened fire a few minutes later at short range and badly damaged Kirishima, knocking out her aft turrets, jamming her rudder, and hitting the ship below the waterline. The flooding proved to be uncontrollable and Kirishima capsized three and a half hours later. Returning to Japan after the Battle of Leyte Gulf, Kongō was torpedoed and sunk by the American submarine Sealion II on 21 November 1944. Haruna was based at Kure, Japan when the naval base was attacked by British and American carrier aircraft on 24 and 28 July 1945. The ship was only lightly damaged by a single bomb hit on 24 July, but was hit a dozen more times on 28 July and sank at her pier. She was refloated after the war and scrapped in early 1946.

The listed battlecruisers are grouped according to causes of the sinking. Within groups, they are listed in chronological order of sinking.

=== Sunk in combat ===
The following ships were destroyed in battle.

Name	Navy	Casualties	Date sunk	Location	Condition	Relics	Image
HMS Invincible	Royal Navy	1,026	31 May 1916	North Sea	Invincible lies in two pieces in 177 feet (54 m) of water	—	A grey warship with two masts, three funnels, and two gun turrets visible, at anchor
HMS Indefatigable	Royal Navy	1,017	31 May 1916	North Sea	Heavily salvaged, only large pieces of metal remain in 183 feet (56 m) of water	One of the ship's lifebelts that survived the sinking is on display at the Imperial War Museum North in Manchester	Right rear oblique shot of a large gray warship with two masts, three funnels, and two gun turrets visible. A number of people are visible on her decks.
HMS Queen Mary	Royal Navy	1,266	31 May 1916	North Sea	Queen Mary lies upside down in two pieces in 196 feet (60 m) of water	—	A dark-gray painted warship with two masts, three funnels, and four gun turrets visible at sea
SMS Lützow	Imperial German Navy	157	1 June 1916	North Sea	Lützow is relatively intact, upside down, in 144 feet (44 m) of water	—	A pencil sketch of a dark-gray warship with two masts, two funnels, and four visible gun turrets at sea
HMS Hood	Royal Navy	1,415	24 May 1941	Denmark Strait	In pieces in 9,200 feet (2,800 m) of water	Two of Hood's 5.5-inch (140 mm) guns, removed earlier during a refit, were installed on Ascension Island where the battery still exists today in a largely intact condition.	A front-quarter view of a large gray warship with two masts, two funnels, and four visible gun turrets at anchor
HMS Repulse	Royal Navy	513	10 December 1941	South China Sea	Almost upside down in 177 feet (54 m) of water	—	Side view of a large warship with one mast and two funnels painted in alternating band of light and dark gray

=== Scuttled battlecruisers ===
Several battlecruisers were scuttled.

Name	Navy	Date sunk	Location	Condition	Relics	Image
SMS Von der Tann	Imperial German Navy	21 June 1919	Scapa Flow	Raised and salvaged at Scapa Flow, 7 December 1930, broken up for scrap	—	Right front oblique view of a white-painted warship at anchor. The ship has two masts, two funnels, and two gun turrets visible.
SMS Moltke	Imperial German Navy	21 June 1919	Scapa Flow	Raised 10 June 1927, broken up for scrap	—	Side view of a gray warship with two masts and two visible gun turrets at anchor. Smoke is rising from one of the two funnels.
SMS Seydlitz	Imperial German Navy	21 June 1919	Scapa Flow	Raised November 1928, broken up for scrap	Ship's bell in the Laboe Naval Memorial	Close front oblique view of a gray warship with two funnels, two visible gun turrets, and two masts
SMS Derfflinger	Imperial German Navy	21 June 1919	Scapa Flow	Raised in 1939, broken up for scrap	Ship's bell outside the Church of St Michael on the Outer Hebrides island of Eriskay	front view of a large warship with a prominent tripod mast above the superstructure at anchor. Two gun turrets are visible and smoke is rising from the two funnels.
SMS Hindenburg	Imperial German Navy	21 June 1919	Scapa Flow	Raised 22 July 1930, broken up for scrap	Ship's bell in the Laboe Naval Memorial	Side view of a large warship with a prominent tripod mast above the superstructure at anchor. Four gun turrets and two funnels are visible.
HMAS Australia	Royal Australian Navy	12 April 1924	Off Sydney Heads	At a depth of 1,332 feet (406 m)	Various artifacts, including a propeller at the Australian War Memorial	Front oblique view of a large warship at anchor with two masts, three funnels, and two gun turrets visible

=== Converted battlecruisers ===
Several battlecruisers were converted into other ship types either during construction or after entering service; many of these ships were sunk in combat during World War II.

Name	Navy	Conversion	Casualties	Date sunk	Location	Condition	Image
HMS Courageous	Royal Navy	Aircraft carrier	519	17 September 1939	Western Approaches	Unknown	Right front view of a large anchored aircraft carrier with a flight deck that begins some ways back from the bow. Her island incorporates a funnel.
HMS Glorious	Royal Navy	Aircraft carrier	1,207	8 June 1940	North Sea	Unknown	Side view of a gray anchored aircraft carrier with a short flight deck. Her island incorporates a funnel and is surmounted by a tall mast.
USS Lexington	United States Navy	Aircraft carrier	216	8 May 1942	Coral Sea	In 3 pieces 10,000 feet (3,000 m) below the surface.	Left front oblique aerial view of a dirty grey aircraft carrier. Her full-length flight deck is covered by aircraft and she has an enormous funnel separate from her island.
Akagi	Imperial Japanese Navy	Aircraft carrier	267	5 June 1942	Off Midway Island	At a depth of 18,011 feet (5,490 m) upright, mostly intact.	An aerial view of an aircraft carrier at sea. Her small island is on the left side and only three aircraft are visible on her flight deck at the bow.
Hiei	Imperial Japanese Navy	Battleship	188	14 November 1942	Ironbottom Sound	Unknown	Side view of a dark gray warship at speed. She has two funnels, one mast and a massive forward superstructure.
Kirishima	Imperial Japanese Navy	Battleship	212	15 November 1942	Ironbottom Sound	Upside down in 4,000 feet (1,200 m) of water, bow missing (separated from main hull, condition unknown).	Side view of an anchored dark-gray warship with four gun turrets, two funnels, one mast and a prominent forward superstructure.
Kongō	Imperial Japanese Navy	Battleship	1,250	21 November 1944	Formosa Strait	Unknown	Side view of a large dark-gray warship moving at slow speed. Visible are four gun turrets, two funnels, one mast and a prominent forward superstructure.
Haruna	Imperial Japanese Navy	Battleship	65	24 July 1945	Kure	Scrapped, 1946	
USS Saratoga	United States Navy	Aircraft carrier	0	25 July 1946	Bikini Atoll	Saratoga is upright, with the top of the bridge 50 feet (15 m) below the surface, largest WWII Carrier accessible to divers.	left front oblique aerial view of a dark-gray aircraft carrier at sea. Her flight deck is beige colored and has a dozen or so aircraft at the stern.

== See also ==
- List of battlecruisers
- List of sunken battleships
- List of sunken aircraft carriers
- List of sunken nuclear submarines
