= List of sunken aircraft carriers =

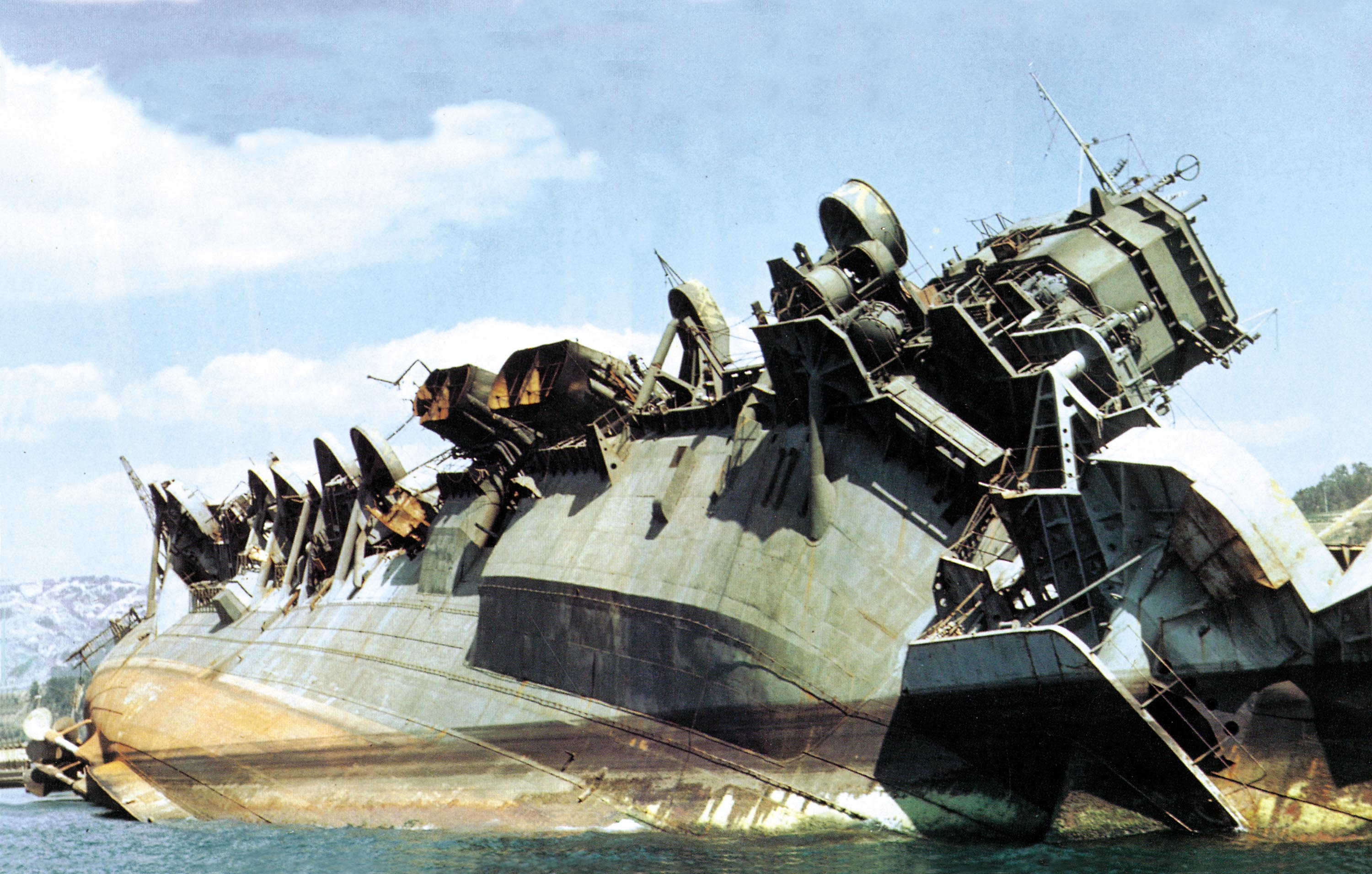
Amagi, capsized in Kure harbor, 1946

With the introduction of military aircraft, the aircraft carrier has become a decisive warship class. In 1911 aircraft began to be successfully launched and landed on ships, with the successful flight of a Curtiss Pusher aboard USS Pennsylvania. The British Royal Navy pioneered the first aircraft carrier with floatplanes rather than flying boats, which under-performed compared to land-based aircraft. The first true aircraft carrier was HMS Argus, launched in late 1917 with a complement of 20 aircraft and a flight deck 550 ft (170 m) long and 68 ft (21 m) wide. As of 2026 the last aircraft carrier sunk in wartime was the Japanese aircraft carrier Amagi, in Kure Harbour in July 1945. The greatest loss of life was the 2,046 killed on Akitsu Maru—a landing craft carrier and troop transport with a small flight deck, carrying the Imperial Japanese Army's 64th Infantry Regiment.

Submarines were a major enemy of aircraft carriers, having sunk eighteen throughout the Second World War, including the Japanese aircraft carrier Shinano, the heaviest carrier of the war and the largest object sunk by a submarine, when she was hit by four torpedoes from USS Archerfish. Carrier-based aircraft sank sixteen opposing aircraft carriers, and land-based aircraft sank five. Ten were sunk in non-combat zones, six were sunk as target ships, one was scuttled to prevent capture, one was sunk as a block ship, one was sunk by an internal explosion, and one was scuttled after scrapping was refused.

Only three (possibly four) carriers were sunk by gunfire in a surface engagement. HMS Glorious was ferrying aircraft to Norway in June 1940 when the German battleships Scharnhorst and Gneisenau found her within gun range and opened fire, sinking Glorious and her escorting destroyers. In October 1942, after the Battle of the Santa Cruz Islands, the Japanese destroyers Akigumo and Makigumo are sometimes credited with finishing off the crippled and abandoned American aircraft carrier USS Hornet, but Hornet was already sinking with a 45 degree list after bomb and torpedo damage by aircraft operating from the carriers Shōkaku and Zuikaku, and it is debatable whether their torpedoes really affected Hornet's fate. In October 1944, USS Gambier Bay was sunk by naval gunfire primarily from the Japanese battleship Yamato in the Battle off Samar. Meanwhile, the Japanese light carrier Chiyoda was crippled by US dive bombers, and later finished off by a US cruiser task force.

== Brazil ==
Image	Ship	Type	Aircraft component	Sinking			
Image	Ship	Type	Aircraft component	Date	Location	Casualties	Conditions
	Foch, later São Paulo	Fleet carrier	40 aircraft	3 February 2023	Atlantic Ocean	—	Scuttled by the Brazilian Navy after being denied scrapping in Aliaga, Turkey.

== France ==
Image	Ship	Type	Aircraft component	Sinking			
Image	Ship	Type	Aircraft component	Date	Location	Casualties	Conditions
	Biter later Dixmude	Escort carrier	21 aircraft	10 June 1966	Mediterranean Sea	—	Out of service 1953. Sunk by United States Navy as target.

== Germany ==
Image	Ship	Type	Aircraft component	Sinking			
Image	Ship	Type	Aircraft component	Date	Location	Casualties	Conditions
	Graf Zeppelin	Fleet carrier	42 aircraft	16 August 1947	Baltic Sea 55°31′03″N 18°17′09″E	—	Never completed during World War II and extensively damaged by retreating Germans. Raised but later sunk by USSR as target.

== Italy ==
Image	Ship	Type	Aircraft component	Sinking			
Image	Ship	Type	Aircraft component	Date	Location	Casualties	Conditions
	Aquila	Fleet carrier	51 aircraft	19 April 1945	Genova Harbor, Italy	—	Never completed. Sunk by Italian divers to prevent use as a blockship by Germans.
	Sparviero	Light carrier	34 aircraft	5 October 1944	Genova Harbor, Italy	—	Never completed. Sunk by Germans to block Genova Harbor

== Japan ==
Image	Ship	Type	Aircraft component	Sinking			
Image	Ship	Type	Aircraft component	Date	Location	Casualties	Conditions
	Akagi	Fleet carrier	66 aircraft	5 June 1942	30°30′N 178°40′W	267	Scuttled following bomb damage from the aircraft carrier USS Enterprise at the Battle of Midway
	Akitsu Maru	landing craft carrier	8 aircraft	15 November 1944	East China Sea	2,046	Torpedoed by USS Queenfish
	Amagi	Fleet carrier	66 aircraft	27 July 1945	Kure Harbor	"Light"	Sunk during the attack on Kure Harbour 24–27 July
	Chitose	Light carrier	30 aircraft	25 October 1944	19°20′N 126°20′E	903	Sunk by torpedo bombers during the Battle of Leyte Gulf
	Chiyoda	Light carrier	30 aircraft	25 October 1944	18°37′N 126°45′E	1,470	Crippled by dive bombers. Later sunk by cruisers USS Santa Fe, USS Mobile, USS Wichita, and USS New Orleans during the Battle of Leyte Gulf.
	Chūyō	Escort carrier	27 aircraft	4 December 1943	32°37′N 143°39′E	1,250	Torpedoed by submarine USS Sailfish
	Hiyō	Fleet carrier	53 aircraft	20 June 1944	16°20′N 132°32′E	247	Sunk by torpedo bombers from USS Belleau Wood during the Battle of the Philippine Sea
	Hiryū	Fleet carrier	53 aircraft	5 June 1942	Midway Atoll	385	Scuttled after damage from USS Enterprise dive bombers at the Battle of Midway
	Kaga	Fleet carrier	72 aircraft	5 June 1942	Midway Atoll	811	Scuttled following damage from USS Enterprise dive bombers during the Battle of Midway,
	Ryūjō	Light carrier	48 aircraft	24 August 1942	Solomon Islands	120	Sunk by torpedo bombers and dive bombers during the Battle of the Eastern Solomons
	Shimane Maru	Escort carrier	12 aircraft	24 July 1945	34°20′10″N 134°10′15″E	—	Sunk by aircraft from the Royal Navy
	Shinano	Fleet carrier	47 aircraft	29 November 1944	32°0′N 137°0′E	1,435	Torpedoed by submarine USS Archerfish
	Shin'yō	Escort carrier	27 aircraft	17 November 1944	East China Sea	1,130	Torpedoed by submarine USS Spadefish
	Shōhō	Light carrier	30 aircraft	6 May 1942	16°07′S 151°54′E	834	Sunk by dive bombers during the Battle of the Coral Sea.
	Shōkaku	Fleet carrier	72 aircraft	19 June 1944	11°40′N 137°40′E	1,272	Torpedoed by submarine USS Cavalla during the Battle of the Philippine Sea.
	Sōryū	Fleet carrier	57 aircraft	4 June 1942	30°38′N 179°13′W	711	Scuttled following bomb damage from the aircraft carrier USS Yorktown at the Battle of Midway
	Taihō	Fleet carrier	65 aircraft	19 June 1944	12°05′N 138°12′E	1,650	Torpedoed by submarine USS Albacore during the Battle of the Philippine Sea.
	Taiyō	Escort carrier	23 aircraft	18 August 1944	18°10′N 120°22′E	~790	Torpedoed by submarine USS Rasher off Cape Bolinao, Luzon.
	Unryū	Fleet carrier	57 aircraft	19 December 1944	29°59′N 124°03′E	1,238	Torpedoed by submarine USS Redfish
	Un'yō	Escort carrier	27 aircraft	17 September 1944	19°8′N 116°36′E	239	Torpedoed by submarine USS Barb
	Yamashio Maru	Escort carrier	8 aircraft	17 February 1945	Yokohama harbor	—	Sunk by aircraft from US Navy
	Zuihō	Light carrier	30 aircraft	25 October 1944	19°20′N 125°15′E	215	Sunk by aircraft from US Navy Task Force 38 during the Battle of Leyte Gulf.
	Zuikaku	Fleet carrier	72 aircraft	25 October 1944	19°20′N 125°51′E	843	Sunk by aircraft from US Navy Task Force 38 during the Battle of Leyte Gulf

== United Kingdom ==
Image	Ship	Type	Aircraft component	Sinking			
Image	Ship	Type	Aircraft component	Date	Location	Casualties	Conditions
	Ark Royal	Fleet carrier	60 aircraft	14 November 1941	Western Mediterranean 36°3′N 4°45′W	1	Torpedoed by German submarine U-81 on 13 November 1941. Sank next day while under tow to Gibraltar.
	Audacity	Escort carrier	8 aircraft	21 December 1941	North Atlantic 43°45′N 19°54′W	73	Torpedoed by German submarine U-751
	Avenger	Escort carrier	15 aircraft	15 November 1942	36°15′N 07°45′W	516	Torpedoed by German submarine U-151 en route to Gibraltar
	Courageous	Fleet carrier	48 aircraft	17 September 1939	North Atlantic 50°10′N 14°45′W	519	Torpedoed by German submarine U-29
	Dasher	Escort carrier	15 aircraft	27 March 1943	Firth of Clyde; 55°36′N 5°00′W	379	Sunk from internal explosion of unknown cause.
	Eagle	Fleet carrier	30 aircraft	11 August 1942	Western Mediterranean 38°3′N 3°1′E	131	Torpedoed by German submarine U-73 while escorting convoy to resupply Malta
	Glorious	Fleet carrier	48 aircraft	8 June 1940	Norwegian Sea; 68°38′N 03°50′E	1,207	Sunk by gunfire from German battleships Scharnhorst and Gneisenau.
	Hermes	Light carrier	20 aircraft	9 April 1942	Indian Ocean east of Batticaloa, Sri Lanka	307	Sunk by Imperial Japanese aircraft.

== United States ==
Image	Ship	Type	Aircraft component	Sinking			
Image	Ship	Type	Aircraft component	Date	Location	Casualties	Conditions
	America	Fleet carrier	79 aircraft	14 May 2005	Cape Hatteras	—	Scuttled after being used as target
	Bismarck Sea	Escort carrier	27 aircraft	21 February 1945	Off Iwo Jima	318	Sunk by two Japanese kamikaze aircraft during the Battle of Iwo Jima
	Block Island	Escort carrier	24 aircraft	29 May 1944	Off the Canary Islands	6	Torpedoed by German submarine U-549
	Gambier Bay	Escort carrier	28 aircraft	25 October 1944	Off Samar Island in the Philippines	147	Sunk by surface ships of the Japanese Center Force during the Battle off Samar
	Hornet	Fleet carrier	90 aircraft	27 October 1942	Off the Santa Cruz Islands	140	Crippled by torpedo bombers and dive bombers from Japanese fast carriers, finished by torpedoes from the Japanese destroyers Makigumo and Akigumo after failed attempt to scuttle during the Battle of the Santa Cruz Islands.
	Independence	Light carrier	30 aircraft	29 September 1951	Farallon Islands	—	Used as target during Operation Crossroads and later scuttled after decontamination tests
	Langley	Seaplane tender (ex fleet carrier)	34 aircraft	27 February 1942	about 75 mi south of Tjilatjap harbor (Java)	319 (Note: According to the Bureau of Naval Personnel a total of 288 U.S. Navy officers and crewmen from Langley were missing in action and later declared dead following the sinking of Langley and the two ships (Pecos and Edsall) that rescued survivors but were also sunk shortly afterwards. Including the 31 United States Army Air Forces pilots that were originally on Langley that also died in a subsequent sinking, a total of 319 from Langley were killed.)	Scuttled following bomb hits from Japanese land based bombers
	Lexington	Fleet carrier	91 aircraft	8 May 1942	Coral Sea	216	Scuttled after damage from the aircraft carriers Shōkaku and Zuikaku at the Battle of the Coral Sea.
	Liscome Bay	Escort carrier	28 aircraft	24 November 1943	off Butaritari Island	702	Torpedoed by Japanese submarine I-175 during the Battle of Makin
	Ommaney Bay	Escort carrier	28 aircraft	4 January 1945	Sulu Sea	95	Scuttled after hit by a land based Japanese kamikaze
	Oriskany	Fleet carrier	91 aircraft	17 May 2006	off Pensacola, Florida	—	Sunk to become an artificial reef
	Princeton	Light carrier	45 aircraft	24 October 1944	Leyte Gulf	108	Sunk by land-based Japanese bomber during the Battle of Leyte Gulf
	St. Lo	Escort carrier	28 aircraft	25 October 1944	Leyte Gulf	143	Sunk by Japanese kamikaze aircraft during the Battle off Samar
	Saratoga	Fleet carrier	91 aircraft	25 July 1946	Bikini Atoll	—	Sunk as target during Operation Crossroads
	Wasp	Fleet carrier	76 aircraft	15 September 1942	Southeast of San Cristobal Island	193	Sunk by the Japanese submarine I-19 during the Guadalcanal campaign.
	Yorktown	Fleet carrier	90 aircraft	7 June 1942	North of Midway Island	141	Crippled by Japanese dive bombers and torpedo bombers from the carrier Hiryū during the Battle of Midway later finished off by Japanese submarine I-168 while under tow.

== See also ==
- List of sunken battleships
- List of sunken battlecruisers
- List of sunken nuclear submarines
- List of aircraft carriers
- Timeline for aircraft carrier service
