= Soviet submarine K-159 =

Former nuclear-powered Soviet submarine

Coordinates: 69°22.64′N 33°49.51′E

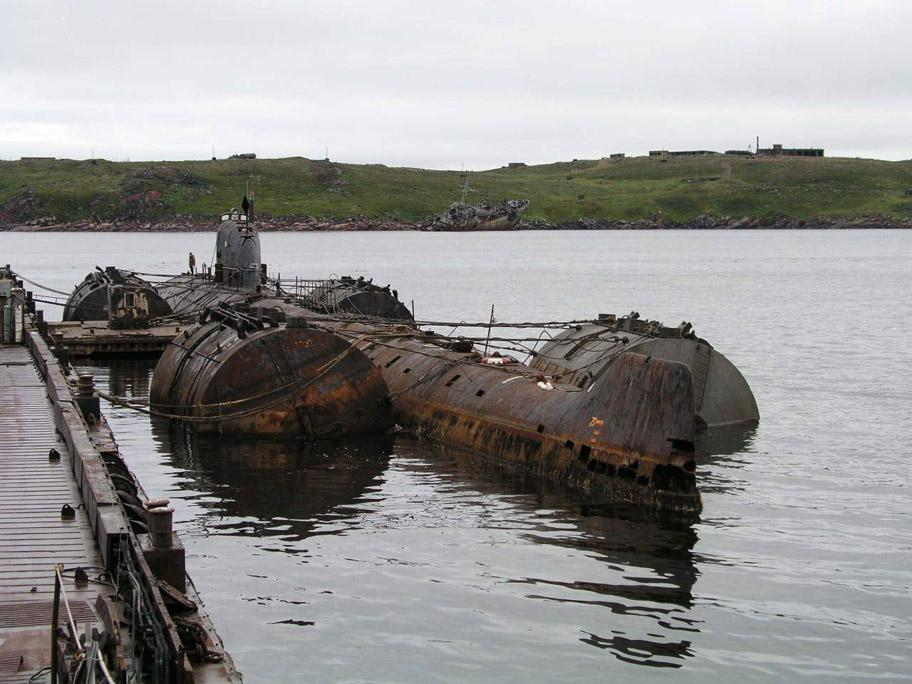
- Decommissioned submarine K-159 (renamed as B-159 in 1989) in Gremikha Bay of Barents Sea, 28 August 2003 – ready for towing to the shipyard for scrapping.

History
- Name: K-159
- Laid down: 15 August 1962
- Launched: 6 June 1963
- Commissioned: 9 October 1963
- Decommissioned: 30 May 1989
- Fate: Sank while under tow for scrapping 30 August 2003 at 69°22.64'N 33°49.51'E

General characteristics
- Class & type: November-class submarine

Service record
- Part of: Northern Fleet

K-159 (Russian: К–159) was a Project 627A "Kit" (Russian: проект-627A кит, NATO reporting name November-class) nuclear-powered submarine that served in the Northern Fleet of the Soviet Navy from 1963–89. Her keel was laid down on 15 August 1962 at the Severodvinsk "Sevmash" Shipyard No. 402. She was launched on 6 June 1963, and commissioned on 9 October 1963.

== Radioactive discharge accident ==
On 2 March 1965, K-159 suffered an accident involving radioactive discharges into her steam generators, almost certainly primary coolant leaks from the tubes into the steam chest and thence into the turbines, contaminating her entire propulsion plant. If so, the leaking tubes were plugged, because she continued to operate for another two years before entering the shipyard from 1967 through 1968 for overhaul and to have her steam generators replaced. She returned to the shipyard from 1970 through 1972 for further repairs and refuelling, and then again from 1979 through 1980 for still more repairs.

== Decommissioning and after-service life ==
K-159 was decommissioned on 30 May 1989 and laid up in Gremikha; her reactors were probably not defuelled. She remained in layup with little or no maintenance for 14 years. Her outer hull rusted until in many places it had "the strength of foil".

The poor condition of Russia's fleet of decommissioned nuclear submarines concerned the nearby Baltic and Scandinavian nations, and in mid-2003, five countries made a combined donation of more than US$200 million in support of decommissioning and disposal of the submarines. In anticipation of receiving those funds, Admiral Gennady Suchkov, Commander of the Northern Fleet, decided to tow all the 16 laid up submarines from Gremikha to shipyards where they would be dismantled. K-159 was the 13th hull to be towed.

Because K-159's hull was rusted through in so many places, it was kept afloat by spot-welding large empty tanks to her sides as pontoons. Those tanks, however, were manufactured in the 1940s, were not air-tight, and were no better maintained than the submarine's hull.

== Foundering and sinking ==
On 28 August 2003, K-159 and her pontoons were crewed by ten Russian sailors and taken under tow to Polyarny. That crew kept the pontoons pressurized and the submarine hull pumped out, but during the early morning hours of 30 August they encountered a squall that ripped away one of the pontoons. K-159 did not sink immediately, but was clearly in distress. Northern Fleet was notified at 01:20, and Admiral Suchkov arrived at headquarters 20 minutes later. By 03:00 the wreck had sunk in the Barents Sea, 200 metres down, with nine of her crew and most likely 800 kilograms of spent nuclear fuel containing some 5.3 gigabecquerels of radionuclides.

The Military Prosecutor General's office brought charges against Captain Second Class Sergei Zhemchuzhnov who was overseeing the towing operation. President of Russia Vladimir Putin removed Suchkov from service on the recommendation of Navy Chief of Staff Vladimir Kuroyedov. Putin appointed Vice Admiral Sergey Simonenko acting Commander of the Northern Fleet. Before that, he headed the headquarters of the Northern Fleet.

The Russian government considered plans to raise the wreck of K-159. Admiral Kuroyedov believed that "we should not leave nuclear objects lying on the seabed". Initial plans were to do so in August or September 2004, but they were postponed. In 2007, the British Ministry of Defence began preparations for a salvage operation. As part of that recovery planning, the Scottish company Adus was hired to evaluate the wreck. A high-resolution sonar generated image of K-159 was published on 1 April 2010.

In March 2020, Russian President Vladimir Putin issued a draft decree for an initiative to lift the K-159 and K-27 and four reactor compartments from the Barents Sea. It is likely that a special salvage vessel will need to be built increasing the estimated recovery cost of US$330m.

== Legal actions ==
Shortly after the loss of the submarine, the widows of four of the nine deceased submariners filed a lawsuit against the Russian Defence Ministry demanding compensation of one million rubles (about $US37,500) each in moral damages, a lawyer acting for them said. The Ministry objected to the suit, saying that the widows should press charges against Suchkov, who was convicted by a court martial of criminal negligence leading to the submariners' deaths.

Two bodies were recovered immediately. Senior Lieutenant Maksim Tsibul'skij was rescued alive and recovered in the Severomorsk Military Hospital. The other seven were presumably trapped in the wreck.

== See also ==
- Major submarine incidents since 2000
- List of sunken nuclear submarines
- Kursk submarine disaster
