= Sechenovsky District =

Sechenovsky District Сеченовский район (Russian)
- District
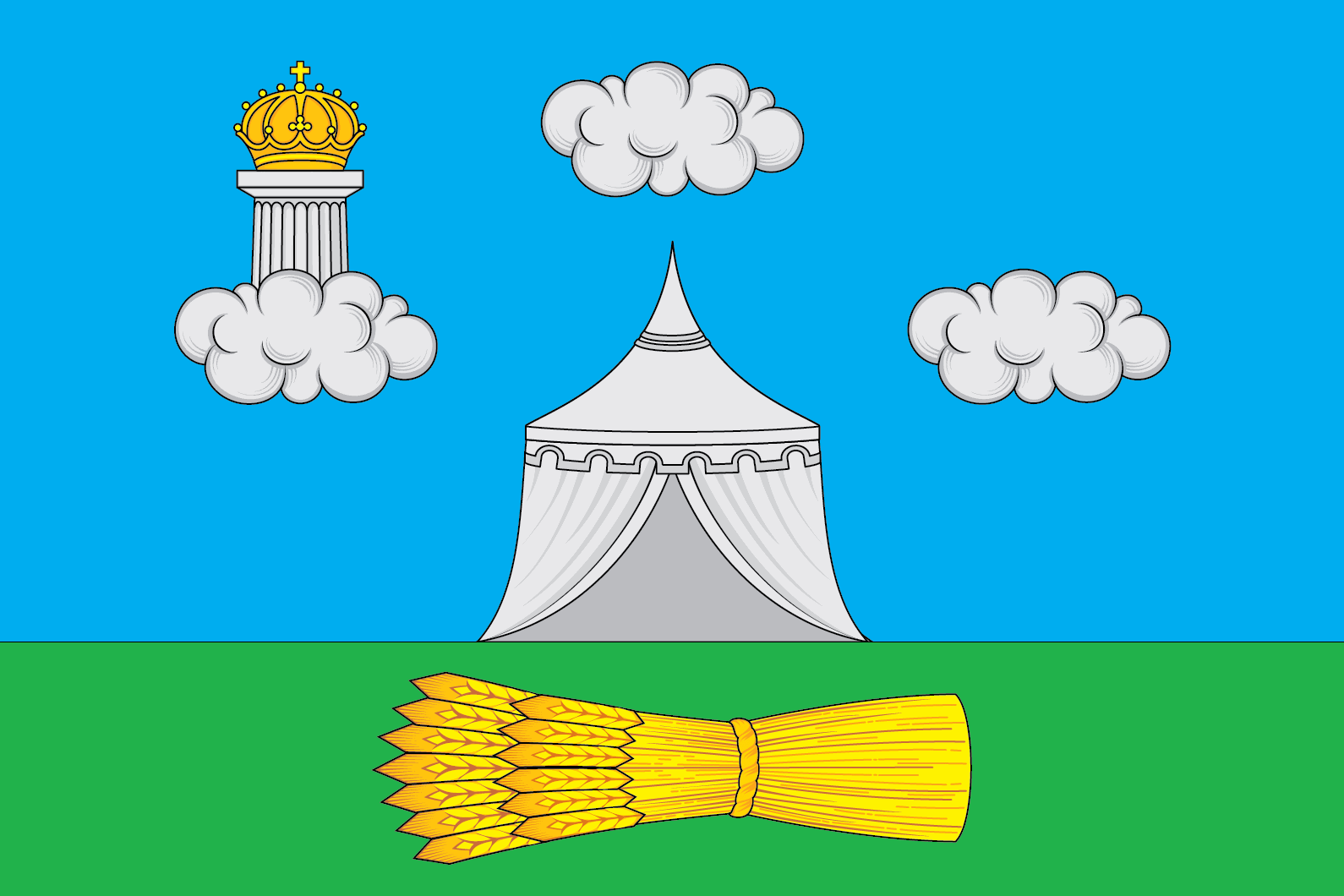
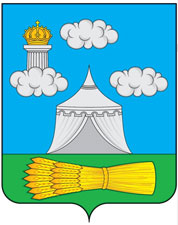
- Flag Coat of arms
- Location of Sechenovsky District in Nizhny Novgorod Oblast
- Coordinates: 55°13′28″N 45°53′26″E
- Country: Russia
- Federal subject: Nizhny Novgorod Oblast
- Established: 1929
- Administrative center: Sechenovo

Area
  - Total: 991 km^{2} (383 sq mi)

Population (2010 Census)
  - Total: 15,446
  - Density: 15.6/km^{2} (40.4/sq mi)
  - Urban: 0%
  - Rural: 100%

Administrative structure
  - Administrative divisions: 7 Selsoviets
  - Inhabited localities: 53 rural localities

Municipal structure
  - Municipally incorporated as: Sechenovsky Municipal District
  - Municipal divisions: 0 urban settlements, 7 rural settlements
- Time zone: UTC+3 (MSK)
- OKTMO ID: 22549000
- Website: http://www.sechenovo.omsu-nnov.ru

Sechenovsky District (Russian: Се́ченовский райо́н) is an administrative district (raion), one of the forty in Nizhny Novgorod Oblast, Russia. Municipally, it is incorporated as Sechenovsky Municipal District. It is located in the southeast of the oblast. The area of the district is 991 square kilometers (383 sq mi). Its administrative center is the rural locality (a selo) of Sechenovo. Population: 15,446 (2010 Census); 17,741 (2002 census); 19,338 (1989 Soviet census). The population of Sechenovo accounts for 34.1% of the district's total population.

== History ==
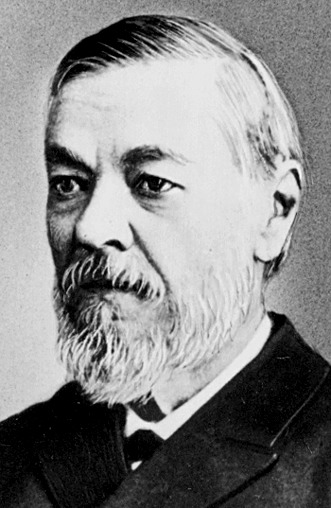
Psysiologist Ivan Sechenov, after whom the district is named

The district was established in 1929 and renamed in 1944 after physiologist Ivan Sechenov.
