= List of sunken nuclear submarines =

The location of sunken nuclear submarines in the Atlantic

Nine nuclear submarines have sunk, either by accident or by scuttling. The Soviet Navy lost five (one of which sank twice), the Russian Navy two, and the United States Navy (USN) two. (A third USN submarine sank during construction but was refloated.)

Three submarines were lost with all hands: the two from the United States Navy (129 and 99 lives lost) and one from the Russian Navy (118 lives lost). These are amongst the largest losses of life in a submarine (along with the non-nuclear USS Argonaut with 102 lives lost and Surcouf with 130 lives lost). All sank as a result of accident except for K-27, which was scuttled in the Kara Sea when proper decommissioning was considered too expensive. The Soviet submarine K-129 carried nuclear ballistic missiles when it was lost with all hands, but as it was a diesel-electric submarine, it is not included in the list. (K-129 was partly recovered by the U.S. Project Azorian.)

The two USN submarines belonged to Submarine Force Atlantic, in the U.S. Atlantic Fleet. All five of the Soviet/Russian nuclear submarines that remain sunken belonged to the Northern Fleet, while the refloated K-429 was in the Pacific Fleet.

Of the nine sinkings, two were caused by fires, two by weapon explosions, two by flooding, one by bad weather, and one by scuttling due to a damaged nuclear reactor. Only USS Scorpion's reason for sinking is unknown. Eight of the submarines are underwater wrecks in the Northern Hemisphere: five of these in the Atlantic Ocean and three in the Arctic Ocean. The ninth submarine, K-429, was raised and returned to active duty after both of her sinkings.

== United States ==
- USS Thresher, the first submarine in her class, sank April 10, 1963 during deep-diving trials after reactor scram, loss of propulsion, and a failed attempt to blow the emergency ballast tanks, causing it to exceed crush depth. All 129 on board died, including shipyard personnel supporting the deep-diving tests. Location: 350 km (190 nmi) east of Cape Cod.
- USS Scorpion, a Skipjack-class submarine, sank May 22, 1968, evidently due to implosion upon reaching crush depth. The results of the U.S. Navy's various investigations into the loss of Scorpion are inconclusive. There are various theories about the loss. All 99 men on board died. Location: 740 kilometres (400 nmi) southwest of the Azores.
- USS Guitarro: sank May 15, 1969 while pier-side in shipyard due to improper ballasting. The submarine was eventually completed and commissioned.

== Soviet Union ==
The location of sunken nuclear submarines in the Arctic
- K-27: The only Project 645 submarine (a variant of the Project 627 November-class submarine, with liquid metal cooled reactors), K-27 was decommissioned in 1979 after many years of difficulty with its reactor. On September 6, 1982, the Soviet Navy scuttled it in shallow water (108 ft (33 m)) in the Kara Sea after sealing the reactor compartment. This sinking in shallow water was contrary to the recommendation of the International Atomic Energy Agency (IAEA).
- K-8: A Project 627 November-class submarine was lost on April 11, 1970 while being towed in rough seas after a fire on board. The submarine's crew was initially evacuated to a surface vessel, but 52 re-boarded the surfaced submarine for the towing operation. All 52 sailors died when the submarine flooded and sank, for total losses of 60 crew when counting the 8 who perished on April 8 in the initial fire. Location: Bay of Biscay, 490 kilometres (260 nmi) northwest of Spain in the North Atlantic Ocean.
- K-219: A Project 667A Yankee I-class submarine was damaged by a fire in a missile tube and explosion on October 3, 1986. It then sank suddenly while being towed after all surviving crewmen had transferred off. Six crew members were killed. Location: 950 kilometres (510 nmi) east of Bermuda in the North Atlantic Ocean.
- K-278 Komsomolets: The only Mike-class sub built sank due to a raging fire April 7, 1989. All but five crewmen evacuated before it sank. A total of 42 crew died, many from smoke inhalation and exposure to the cold waters of the Barents Sea, while 27 crew members survived.
- K-429: A Project 670A Charlie I-class sub sank twice, once at sea from flooding during a test dive (23 June 1983), then two years later (13 September 1985), from flooding at her moorings. Sixteen crew died in the first incident. K-429 was raised after both sinkings, and was decommissioned two years after the second.

== Russia ==
- Kursk (K-141): The Oscar II-class sub sank in the Barents Sea on August 12, 2000 after an explosion in the torpedo compartment. See Kursk submarine disaster. All 118 men on board were killed. All except the bow section was salvaged.
- K-159: Left to rust for 14 years after being decommissioned, this Soviet-era November-class submarine sank in the Barents Sea on August 28, 2003, when a storm ripped away the pontoons necessary to keep it afloat under tow. Nine of the ten salvage men on board were killed.

== See also ==
- Nuclear submarine accidents
- List of sunken aircraft carriers
- List of sunken battlecruisers
- List of sunken battleships
- List of military nuclear accidents
- Lists of nuclear disasters and radioactive incidents
