= Sechenovo =

Rural locality in Nizhny Novgorod Oblast, Russia

Coordinates: 55°13′19″N 45°53′36″E

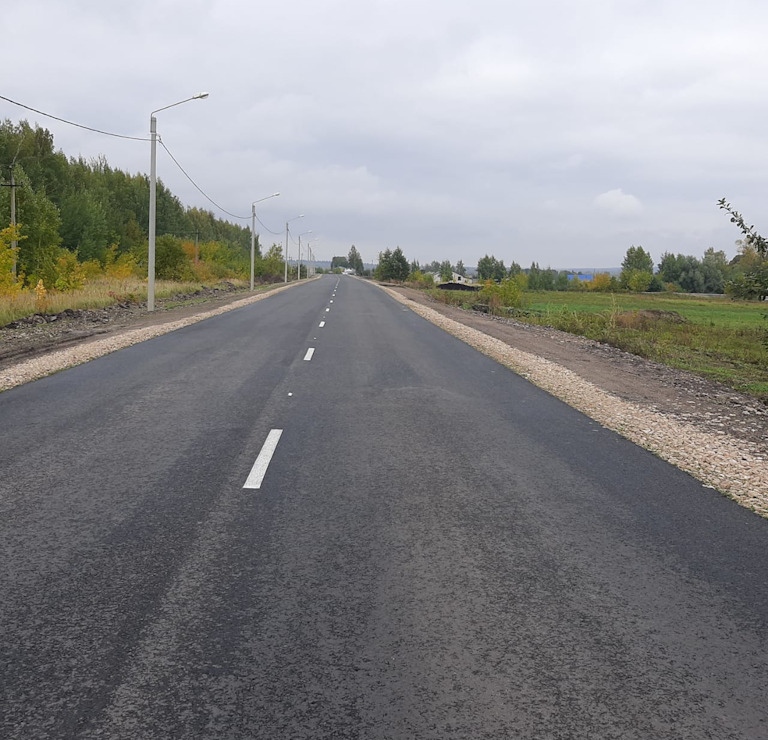
Route 22K-088 heading to Setchenovo in the Nizhni Novgorod oblast

Sechenovo (Russian: Се́ченово) is a rural locality (a selo) and the administrative center of Sechenovsky District, Nizhny Novgorod Oblast, Russia. Population: 5,263 (2010 census); 5,239 (2002 census); 4,085 (1989 Soviet census).
