= ORP Bielik =

Two ships of the Polish Navy have been named ORP Bielik:

- ORP Bielik (295), a Whiskey-class submarine
- ORP Bielik (2003), a Kobben-class submarine acquired in 2003
