= Emil Spiridonov =

Soviet naval officer

Emil Nikolayevich Spiridonov
- Born: 26 September 1925; Makaryev, Soviet Union
- Died: 7 February 1981 (aged 55) Pushkin, Leningrad Oblast, Russian SFSR, Soviet Union
- Buried: Serafimovskoe Cemetery
- Allegiance: Soviet Union
- Branch: Soviet Navy
- Service years: 1942–1981
- Rank: Admiral
- Commands: Pacific Fleet
- Awards: Order of the Red Banner; Order of the Red Star - twice Order "For Service to the Homeland in the Armed Forces of the USSR" Third Class
- Spouse: Valentina

Emil Nikolayevich Spiridonov (Russian: Эмиль Николаевич Спиридонов) (26 September 1925 – 7 February 1981) was an officer of the Soviet Navy. He rose to the rank of admiral and was commander of the Pacific Fleet, before his death in the 1981 Pushkin Tu-104 crash, which also killed many of the Fleet's senior officers.

Born in 1925, Spiridonov's early studies were interrupted by the Second World War, and he joined the navy. His early service was spent in submarines in the Pacific Fleet, where he distinguished himself and advanced through the ranks. Transferred to the Northern Fleet, he took command of his own boat, a Project 629-type ballistic missile submarine, before being advanced to command divisions and squadrons of submarines. Praised for his approach to training, he took courses at the Naval Academy, and was promoted to flag rank. Returning to the Pacific Fleet, he moved up the chain of command, garnering awards and plaudits, and eventually becoming deputy commander of the fleet. After assisting in a difficult rescue operation of a stricken submarine, he was finally appointed commander of the Pacific Fleet.

While returning to the fleet base at Vladivostok, the transport plane he and many other of the fleet's senior officers were travelling in crashed just after takeoff outside Pushkin. There were no survivors. He was buried at the Serafimovskoe Cemetery in then-Leningrad, where a memorial was erected to those killed in the crash. He was honoured after his death with memorial plaques, and a street in Vladivostok and an Udaloy-class destroyer Admiral Spiridonov were named for him.

== Early life ==
Emil Spiridonov was born on 26 September 1925 in the town of Makaryev, Ivanovo-Voznesenskaya Province, Soviet Union. He initially studied at secondary school No. 4 in Frunze, Kyrgyz SSR, graduating in 1940 and attending the Kyrgyz Land Management and Technical College. His studies were interrupted by the German invasion of the Soviet Union. With the college's closure in November 1941, Spiridonov enrolled at Kiev Naval Special School No. 5 that December, and joined the navy after graduating in September 1942. He took the preparatory course at the Caspian Higher Naval School in Baku, and studied at the M.V. Frunze Naval School in Leningrad between 1943 and 1947.

== Early postings ==
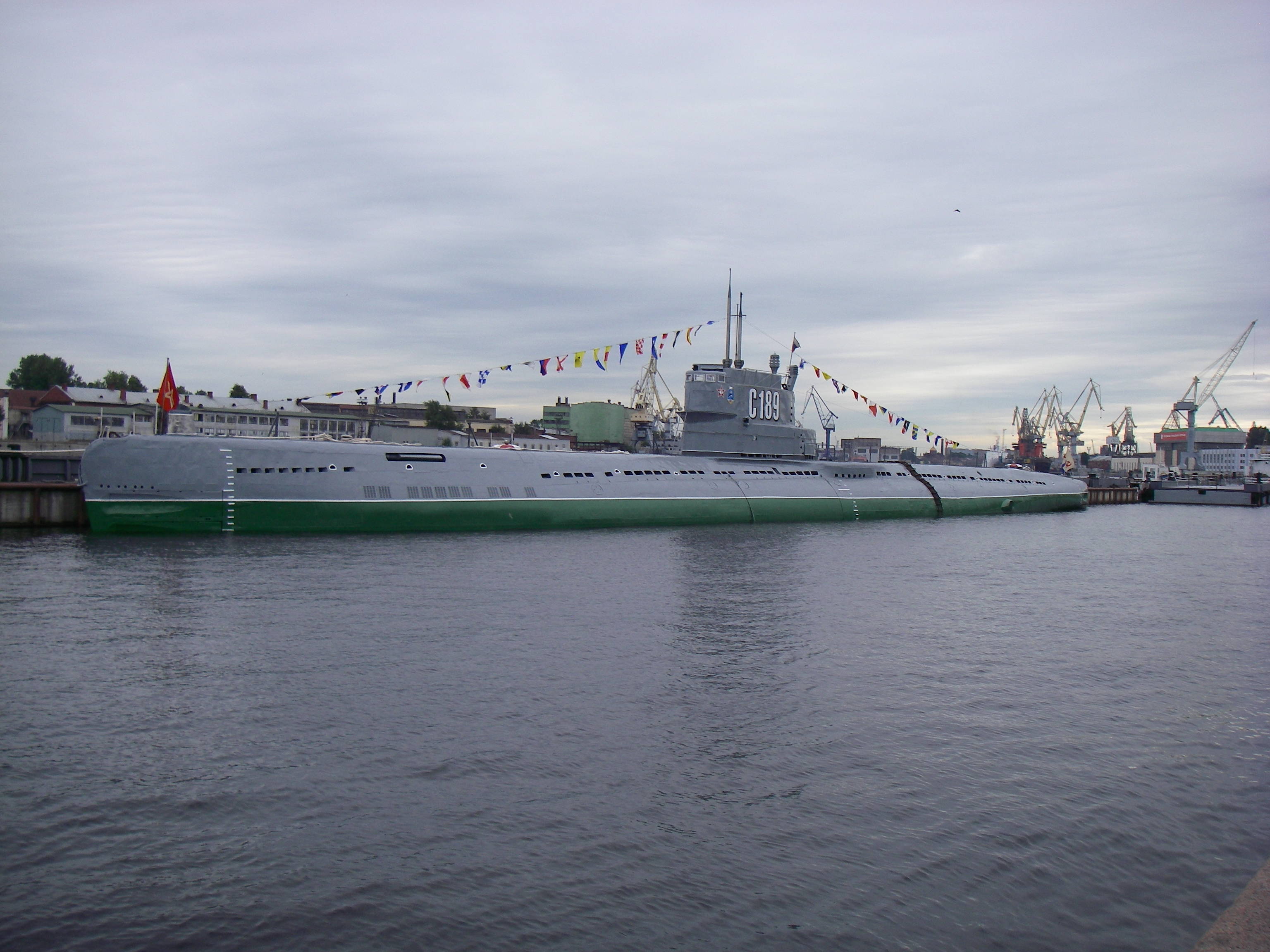
A Project 613-type submarine. Spiridonov served on the S-165 of this class from 1953 to 1954.

From 1948 until 1949 Spiridonov served as a navigator aboard the submarine M-2, of the 6th division of the 2nd submarine squadron of the Pacific Fleet, then based at Nakhodka Bay. On 19 December 1949 he was transferred to the Shch-125 of the 1st submarine squadron, being promoted to senior lieutenant on 19 December 1950. On 8 January 1952 he took the Higher Special Officer Classes for submariners at Vladivostok, graduating in October 1952. He was then assigned to the Shch-22, part of the 123rd squadron of the 40th Submarine Division of the Pacific Fleet. On 9 May 1953 he was appointed to the S-165, a Project 613-type submarine then under construction. Advanced to captain lieutenant on 14 September 1953 with the completion of the S-165, Spiridonov was assigned to the Northern Fleet from 25 June 1954, joining the 297th squadron of the 33rd submarine division.

== Command ==
Impressing his commander, Spiridonov was appointed assistant commander of the S-165 on 9 July, and on 13 November 1954 he became senior assistant commander on the S-44, of the 96th submarine squadron. On 5 November 1956 he was promoted to captain 3rd rank and on 25 November given his first command, the S-185. Impressing his superiors over the next two years he spent in command, he was earmarked for further promotions. On 6 September 1958 he was appointed commander of the Project 629-type ballistic missile submarine B-41, then under construction at Severodvinsk. While B-41 was nearing completion, Spiridonov sailed on a long distance voyage aboard the Project AB611-type submarine B-78, serving as second in command under Captain 2nd rank V. V. Gorontsov. During the voyage Spiridonov familiarised himself with the new type of submarines, and carried out tests of the R-11FM ballistic missile system.

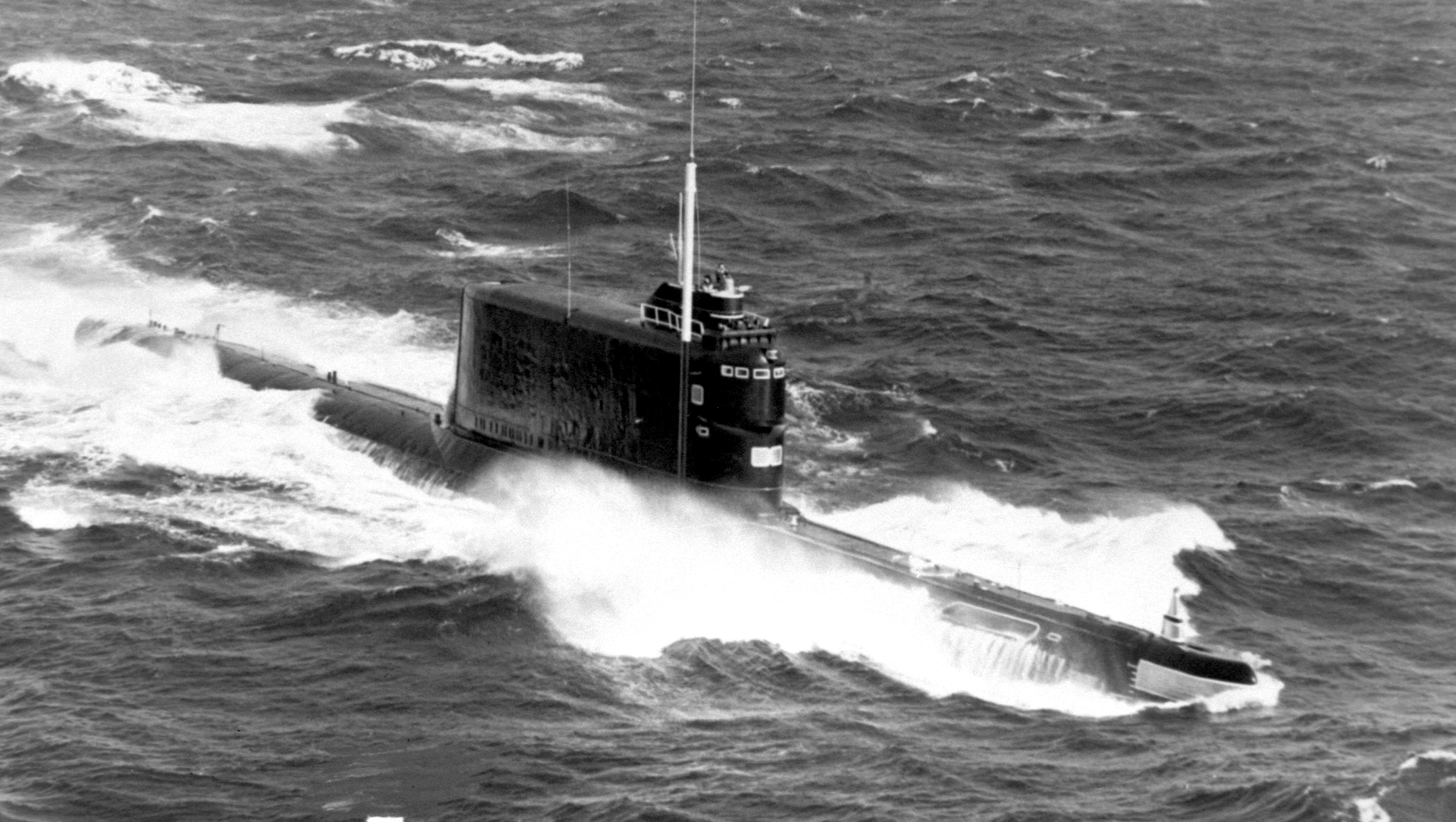
A Project 629-type ballistic missile submarine. Spiridonov's second command was one of these vessels.

With the completion of B-41, Spiridonov brought her to Olenya Bay, where she was commissioned as part of the 140th independent squadron, and assigned the designation K-79. On 7 November 1959 he was promoted to captain, 2nd rank. In January 1960 K-79 was assigned to the Northern Fleet and between June and July Spiridonov took her down to the Canary Islands and then returned to Olenya Bay, carrying out drills and missile exercises. He was commended for his services by the commander of the Northern Fleet, Admiral Andrei Chabanenko, and received a personal weapon from the navy's commander-in-chief.On 21 January 1961 he was appointed Chief of Staff of the 212th squadron of the 8th submarine division of the Northern Fleet. Shortly after his appointment, on 27 January, the S-80 was lost at sea. A State Commission, headed by Marshal Konstantin Rokossovsky, did not return any final conclusions, but still led to a shakeup of personnel.

On 28 June 1961 Spiridonov was appointed Deputy Commander of the 18th Division of the 12th submarine squadron of the Northern Fleet. The division included the latest Project 629 ballistic missile submarines. Spiridonov took control of the training of submarine crews. Between August and December 1961 five new ships were assigned to his unit. Spiridonov personally took each one to sea. On 17 December 1962 he was appointed commander of the 211th brigade of the 4th submarine squadron. The squadron commander assessed Spiridonov as being "A tactically literate, energetic, strong-willed, disciplined, courageous, and decisive commander of the formation. Knows his assigned business well and copes with it successfully. He has extensive practical experience in the submarine service. Repeatedly undertook independent voyages on submarines. Has commanded boats of projects 613, 641, 629. A good sailor, in a difficult situation acts decisively and correctly. Hardworking." Spiridonov was promoted to captain 1st rank on 21 February 1964, and commended by the Northern Fleet's commander, Admiral Semyon Lobov, as "An intelligent and promising officer."

== Flag rank ==
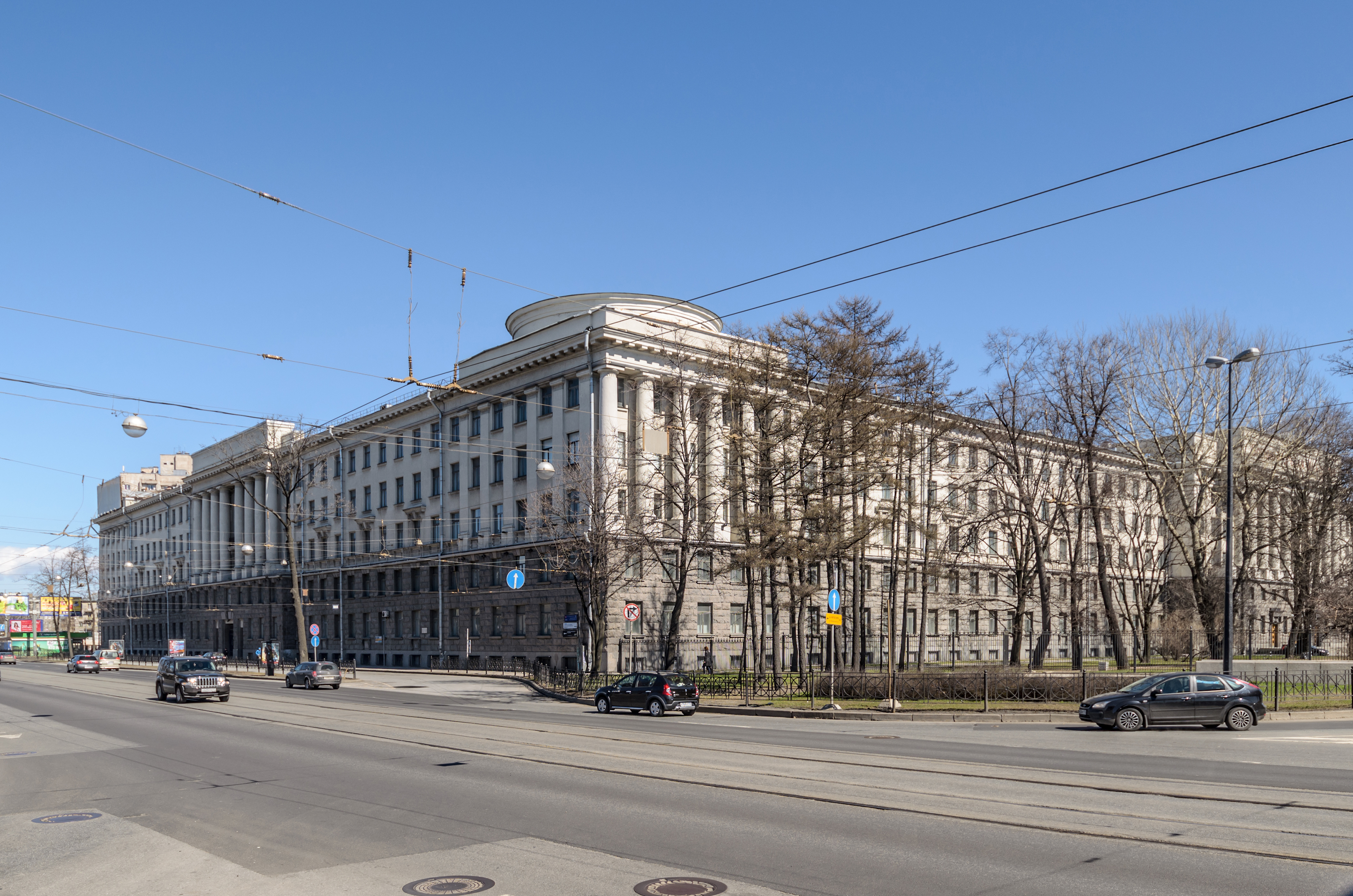
The Naval Academy, where Spiridonov took advanced officer courses.

Spiridonov took at series of courses at the Naval Academy from 29 September 1966 to 3 August 1967, being appointed commander of the 35th division of submarines on 31 January 1967. This division included the new Project 651-type submarines, armed with nuclear ballistic missiles. On 21 February he was awarded the Order of the Red Star and on 19 February 1968 was advanced to rear admiral. On 12 October 1970 he was appointed commander and member of the Military Council of the 15th submarine squadron of the Kamchatka division of the Pacific Fleet. Promoted to vice-admiral on 2 November 1972, Spiridonov achieved good results with training his crews, and the division was recognised as the best unit of the Pacific Fleet. In his assessment of Spiridonov the commander of the Kamchatka division, Vice Admiral V. Sidorov, wrote "In 1973, 100% success in missile firing was achieved, and 97.6% of torpedo firing. A lot of painstaking work to improve the deployment of ships and the life of personnel. Energetic and resolute admiral. Personally sails on submarines and ships of the squadron, teaching the commanders of the formations and ships practically." On 20 October 1973 Spiridonov was appointed commander and member of the Military Council of the 2nd Submarine Flotilla of the Pacific Fleet. On 21 February 1974 he was awarded the Order of the Red Banner. He took several courses at the Military Academy of the General Staff, and on 27 September 1974 he was appointed Deputy Commander of the Pacific Fleet.

In 1977, during his tenure as deputy commander, he took personal charge of the rescue efforts of the Project 667B -type submarine K-477, which suffered a fire while loading nuclear ballistic missiles at the dockside in Kamchatka. Spiridonov flew from Vladivostok to Kamchatka and took the submarine to sea. After a full day of fighting the fire, on 8 September an explosion caused the warhead of a damaged nuclear missile to be ejected from the submarine and sink in the sea. With the submarine now out of danger, Spiridonov brought her back to port and then supervised the recovery of the warhead and its disposal. For his actions he was awarded the Medal "For Courage in a Fire".

On 21 February 1978, he was awarded the Order "For Service to the Homeland in the Armed Forces of the USSR" Third Class, and on 31 August 1979 he was appointed Commander of the Pacific Fleet. This was followed with a promotion to admiral on 25 October 1979.In 1980 he was elected a deputy of the Supreme Soviet of the RSFSR and was a delegate to the 26th Congress of the Communist Party of the Soviet Union.

== Death and legacy ==
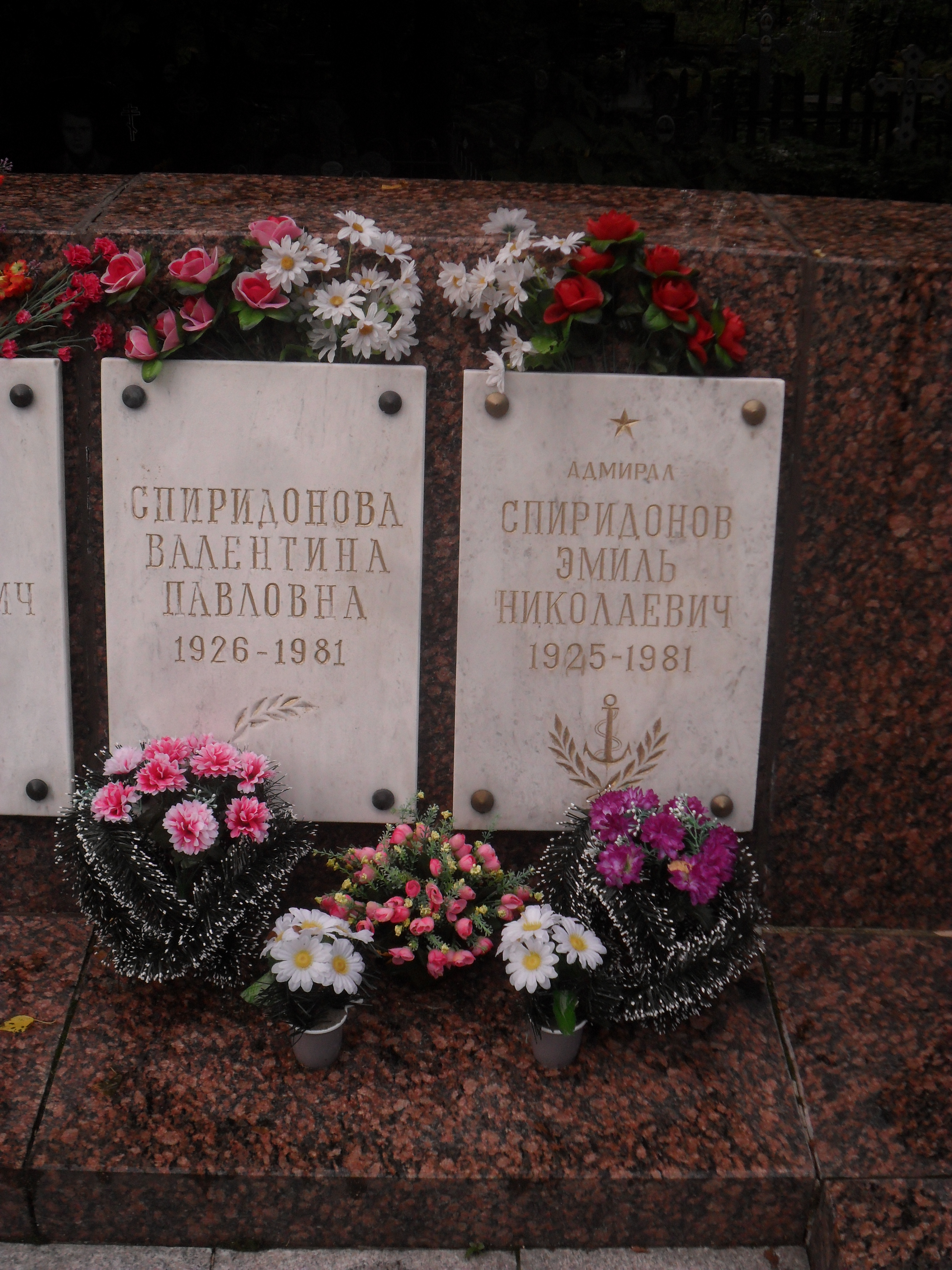
The memorial in the Serafimovskoe Cemetery to Spiridonov and his wife Valentina.

In early 1981, Spiridonov and much of the Pacific Fleet's leadership attended meetings in Leningrad, before planning to return to Vladivostok on 7 February. At 18:00 local time the plane, a Tupolev Tu-104, took off from Pushkin Airport, and almost immediately crashed just clear of the runway, killing all aboard. Spiridonov was the highest ranking officer to die, along with 15 other admirals and generals, and 38 lower ranking officers. Also killed along with Spiridonov was his wife Valentina. They were both interred with most of the other victims of the crash in the Serafimovskoe Cemetery in Leningrad, where a memorial to the dead was erected on the orders of the Navy's Commander-in-Chief, Sergey Gorshkov. A memorial service is held annually on 7 February at the St. Nicholas Naval Cathedral in St Petersburg, and on the twentieth anniversary of the crash the line “Those who died in the line of duty on 7 February 1981” and an Orthodox cross were added to the memorial stele commemorating the Pacific Navy sailors.

Over his career Spiridonov was awarded the Order of the Red Banner, two Orders of the Red Star and the Order "For Service to the Homeland in the Armed Forces of the USSR" Third Class. He was honoured after his death with the naming of a street in Vladivostok and the Udaloy-class destroyer Admiral Spiridonov. Memorial plaques were placed in the Staff Building of the Pacific Fleet in Vladivostok, and in the St. Nicholas Naval Cathedral in St Petersburg.
