= ORP Orzeł (1962) =

1962 submarine of the Polish Navy

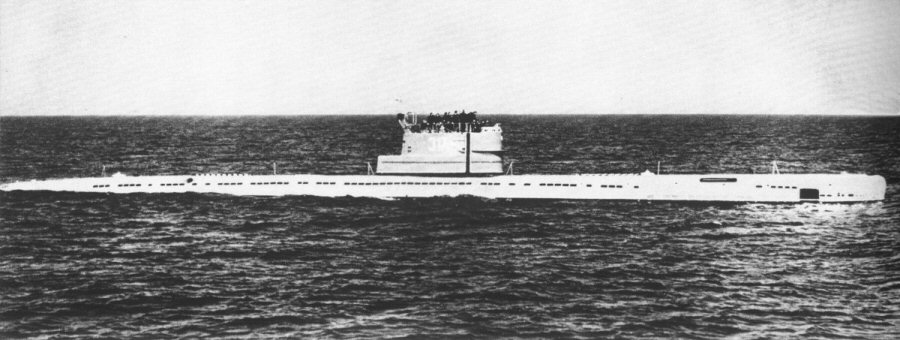
- Orzeł with the 317 code designation

History

Poland
- Name: ORP Orzeł
- Namesake: ORP Orzeł (1938)
- Builder: Plant No. 112 (Gorky)
- Yard number: 611
- Laid down: 27 July 1954
- Launched: 30 November 1954
- Commissioned: 30 July 1955 to Soviet Navy
- Decommissioned: 31 December 1983
- In service: Polish service: 30 December 1962 to 31 December 1983
- Fate: Scrapped 1986

General characteristics
- Displacement: 1,100 t, surfaced; 1,600, submerged
- Length: 76 m (249 ft 4 in)
- Beam: 6.7 m (22 ft 0 in)
- Draft: 4.9 m (16 ft 1 in)
- Speed: 17 knots (31 km/h; 20 mph), surfaced; 15 knots (28 km/h; 17 mph), submerged
- Complement: 54
- Armament: 4 × 533 mm (21.0 in) torpedo launchers (bow); 2 × 533 mm torpedo launchers (stern); 18 torpedoes; up to 52 naval mines

ORP Orzeł a Polish Navy submarine of Project 613 (Whiskey class) . She was built in the Soviet Union as S-265 and was commissioned by the Polish Navy in 1962. She served under the pennant number 292 (317 for a brief period) and was decommissioned in 1983. It was one of the four Whiskey-class submarines operated by the Polish Navy, the other three being ORP Sokół (293), ORP Kondor (294) and ORP Bielik.

In 1968, during Warsaw Pact fleet exercise on Barents Sea, together with the other Polish submarine ORP Kondor, she avoided detection by huge Soviet and East Germany ASW forces, consisting of 300 ships - including nuclear submarines - and about 500 aircraft, and unnoticed entered into the biggest Soviet naval base in Murmansk. A year later, guided by radio-guidance from Poland, Orzeł intercepted in the North Sea a Soviet Sverdlov-class cruiser and torpedoed her by dummy torpedoes. In implementing the Warsaw Pact's Cold War strategy, she also led patrols in the North Atlantic, doing jobs there such as a continuous reconnaissance in close distance to NATO's naval bases, including the most important U.S. strategic submarine base outside United States - Holy Loch in Scotland and also the base of Londonderry in Northern Ireland. She was also exercising the breaking of western marine communication lines in the North Atlantic, as well as carrying out tasks in the North Atlantic training programs, including "Use of weapons and overcome ASW forces exercise program".

On 30 December 1983 she was decommissioned due to poor condition of her hull, after years of service, and scrapped in 1986. During her service, the ORP Orzeł was four times awarded as The Best Ship of Polish Navy (1963, 1965, 1972 and 1977).
