= Soviet submarine S-178 =

Submarine used by the Soviet Navy

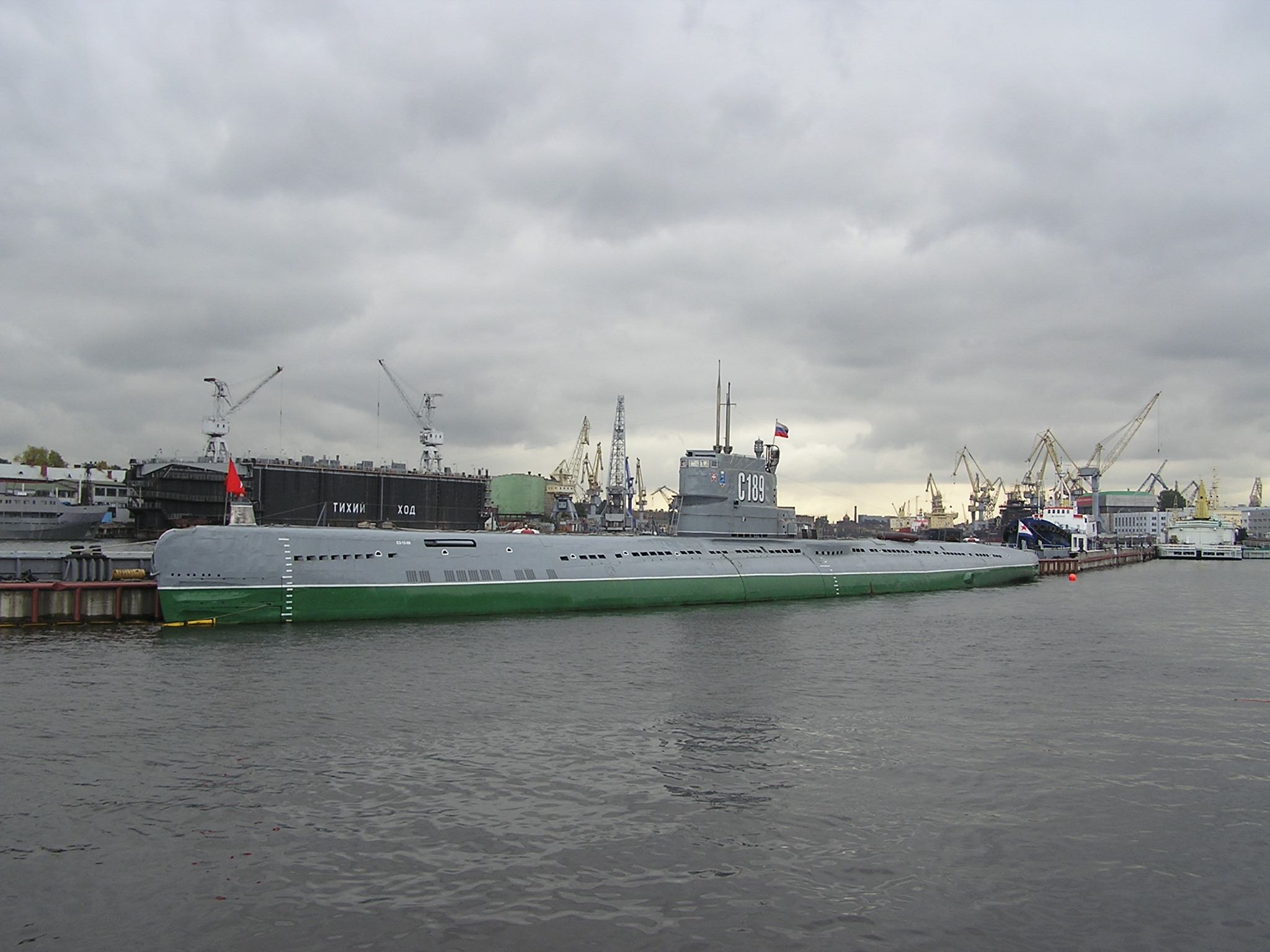
- S-189, sister-ship of S-178

History

Soviet Union
- Name: S-178
- Yard number: 114
- Laid down: 12 December 1953
- Launched: 10 April 1954
- Completed: 20 October 1954
- Homeport: Vladivostok
- Fate: Rammed and sunk by cargo vessel, 21 October 1981, with loss of 32 crewmen

General characteristics
- Class & type: Whiskey-class submarine
- Displacement: 1,080 long tons (1,097 t) surfaced; 1,350 long tons (1,372 t) submerged
- Length: 76 m (249 ft 4 in)
- Beam: 6.6 m (21 ft 8 in)
- Draught: 4.55 m (14 ft 11 in)
- Propulsion: Diesel-electric
- Speed: 18.3 knots (21.1 mph; 33.9 km/h) surfaced; 13.1 knots (15.1 mph; 24.3 km/h) submerged
- Range: 13,000 nmi (24,000 km) at 8 kn (9.2 mph; 15 km/h) surfaced; 353 nmi (654 km) at 2 kn (2.3 mph; 3.7 km/h) submerged
- Endurance: 30 days
- Test depth: 170 m (560 ft)
- Complement: 52 officers and men
- Armament: 6 × 21 in (533 mm) torpedo tubes (4 forward, 2 aft); 12 × torpedoes or 22 × mines; 1 × 25 mm (1 in) AA gun

С-178 (S-178) was a Project 613B (NATO: Whiskey-class) diesel submarine of the Soviet Navy. On October 21, 1981, in the Sea of Japan, the submarine under the command of Valery Marango was hit by a cargo ship. The collision killed 32 sailors.

== Collision and loss ==
On 21 October 1981, S-178, under the command of Captain Third Rank V.A. Marango, was transiting on the surface at 9 knots (17 km/h), returning to base after two days of sound trials. The sea state was 2 (less than one-metre waves) and night time visibility was unlimited. The starboard diesel was under repair, so the propulsion plant was aligned port diesel, starboard electric motor. For convenience, the diesel mechanics and electricians had opened the watertight doors between compartments. In addition, the cooks had opened other watertight doors so that they could serve dinner.

At 19:30 local time, S-178 received permission to save time by entering Golden Horn Bay, in downtown Vladivostok, through a combat training range. The port officer who granted that permission had just assumed the watch, and was unaware that the off-going watch officer had granted similar permission to the refrigerated stores vessel RFS Refrizherator-13 to leave Golden Horn Bay through the combat training range.

Watchmen on RFS-13 noticed navigation lights which they took to be a fishing trawler. At about the same time, the pilot of RFS-13 noted a contact on radar which was showing decreasing range and zero bearing rate, indicating a collision course. On S-178, sonar reported detection of another vessel, but that report was lost in the relaxed atmosphere prevailing on the submarine after dinner.

Nautical "rules of the road" and the rules of navigation in Vladivostok port agree that the ship should yield the right-of-way to the submarine; however, master V.F. Kurdyukov of RFS-13 chose not to alter course. The lookouts on S-178 did not spot RFS-13's running lights against the background of the lights of Vladivostok until the ship was upon them. The captain gave the orders "hard right rudder" and "Signalman, illuminate that vessel", but too late to have any effect.

At 19:45 Refrizherator-13 struck S-178 at an angle of 20–30 degrees on the port side of the sixth compartment at a speed of 8 knots (15 km/h), tearing a hole about two square metres in area. The sixth compartment flooded completely in 15 to 20 seconds. The boat rolled sharply, throwing the 11 men on the bridge into the water. The inrushing water made it impossible to close the watertight doors between the sixth, fifth, and fourth compartments. Approximately 40 seconds after the collision, S-178 had taken on about 130 tons of water, and sank. She hit bottom, rolled 28 degrees to starboard, in 31 meters of water.

Eighteen men died immediately. The 26 survivors in the forward compartments were unable to stop the flooding of the third compartment, so retreated into the first and second compartments about half an hour after the wreck. Four men were trapped in the seventh compartment, including the Chief of Staff of the submarine brigade Captain Second Rank V.Y. Karavekov. When leakage into the seventh compartment reached 15 tons an hour, Karavekov made the decision to escape from that compartment and make a free ascent to the surface. However, they could not open the escape trunk's top hatch. It transpired later that they had not equalized the pressure across the hatch. Four hours later, communications with the seventh compartment ended.

On the surface, RFS-13 rescued seven of the 11 men thrown from the bridge and at 19:57 informed the port authorities of the accident. At 20:15 search and rescue forces were alerted, and steam ships Zhigulis and Mashuk, and the Project 940 Lenok rescue submarine BS-480 Komsomolets Uzbekistan had arrived at the scene of the accident.

At 21:00 the crew of RFS-13 located the emergency buoy from S-178. At 21:50 salvage ships arrived at the scene. Vice-Admiral Golosov commanded salvage operations.

Beginning at 08:45 on 22 October, Komsomolets Uzbekistan began attempting to rescue the trapped crew, but locating the sunken submarine took about 17 hours. The rescue submarine dived three times, without success. Divers finally reached S-178 on 23 October at 03:03. By this time, the trapped crew had despaired of rescue and had begun attempting free ascents. At 20:30 on 23 October, Captain Lieutenant Kubynin, the senior officer among the survivors, was the last of the crew to leave S-178. Three men who reached the surface later died, and three others who left the boat were never found on the surface; it is possible they came up under maneuvering ships and were killed by their screws. Their loss brought the death toll to 31 men.

On 24 October work began to raise the sunken boat. First, pontoons lifted her up to a depth of 15 meters and she was towed into shallow water. Divers then removed the bodies of the victims. On 15 November 1981 S-178 was raised. After her torpedoes were removed, she was dry docked. Repair was deemed impractical, and she was stricken. Her commander, Captain Third Rank Marango, and Kurdyukov, the master of RFS-13, were both sentenced to ten years' imprisonment.

== Bibliography ==
- Friedman, Norman (1995). "Soviet Union 1947–1991: Russian Federation and Successor States 1991–". In Chumbley, Stephen (ed.). Conway's All the World's Fighting Ships 1947–1995. Annapolis, Maryland: Naval Institute Press. pp. 337–426. ISBN 1-55750-132-7.
- Pavlov, A. S. (1997). Warships of the USSR and Russia 1945–1995. Annapolis, Maryland: Naval Institute Press. ISBN 1-55750-671-X.
- Polmar, Norman & Moore, Kenneth J. (2004). Cold War Submarines: The Design and Construction of U.S. and Soviet Submarines. Washington, D. C.: Potomac Books. ISBN 978-1-57488-594-1.
- Polmar, Norman & Noot, Jurrien (1991). Submarines of the Russian and Soviet Navies, 1718–1990. Annapolis, Maryland: Naval Institute Press. ISBN 0-87021-570-1.
