= KRI Pasopati =

Indonesian Navy submarine, retired 1994

Coordinates: 7°15′56″S 112°45′01″E

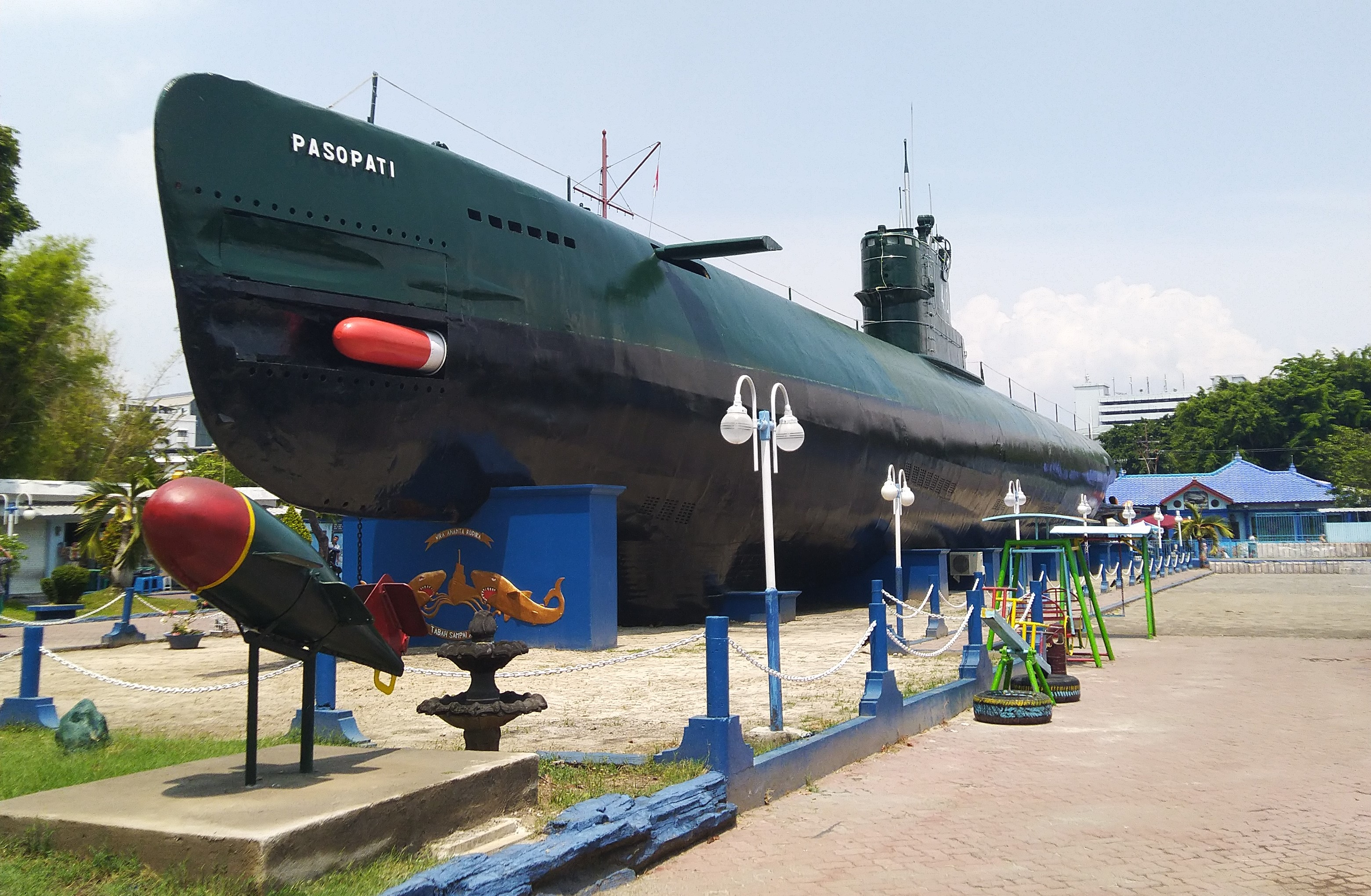
- KRI Pasopati (410) in 2019

History

Soviet Union
- Name: S-290
- Builder: Shipyard No. 112 "Zhdanov", Gorky
- Yard number: 141
- Laid down: 15 April 1955
- Launched: 13 September 1955
- Commissioned: 3 February 1956
- Fate: Sold to Indonesia in 1960s

Indonesia
- Name: Pasopati
- Namesake: Arjuna's Pashupatastra
- Commissioned: 15 December 1962
- Stricken: November 1990
- Identification: 410
- Status: Museum ship in Surabaya

General characteristics
- Class & type: Whiskey-class submarine
- Displacement: 1,045 t (1,028 long tons) (standard); 1,342 t (1,321 long tons) (normal)
- Length: 76 m (249 ft 4 in)
- Beam: 6.30 m (20 ft 8 in)
- Draft: 4.55 m (14 ft 11 in)
- Propulsion: Diesel-electric; 2 × 37-D diesels, 2,000 hp each.; 2 × PG-101 electric motors, 1,350 hp each.; 2 × shaft
- Speed: 13.1 knots (24.3 km/h) submerged; 18.3 knots (33.9 km/h) surfaced
- Range: 8,580 nmi (15,890 km; 9,870 mi) at 10 kn (19 km/h; 12 mph)
- Test depth: 170 m (560 ft)
- Complement: 55
- Sensors & processing systems: Tamir-5L active sonar system; Feniks passive sonar; 'Flag' radar
- Electronic warfare & decoys: Nakat ECM suite
- Armament: 6 × 533 mm (21.0 in) torpedo tubes (4 bow, 2 stern); 12 torpedoes or 22 mines

KRI Pasopati (410) (ex-Soviet submarine S-290) is a retired Project 613 Whiskey-class submarine of the Indonesian Navy.

== Design ==
The initial design was developed in the early 1940s as a sea-going follow on to the S-class submarine. As a result of war experience and the capture of German technology at the end of the war, the Soviets issued a new design requirement in 1946. The revised design was developed by the Lazurit Design Bureau based in Gorkiy. Like most conventional submarines designed 1946–1960, the design was heavily influenced by the Type XXI U-boat.

== History ==
Pasopati is one of twelve vessels delivered to the Indonesian Navy in 1962. Pasopati was involved in Operation Trikora in 1961 she was used to transport marines and arms to the Indonesian army in West Irian and during those operations she was badly damaged. She was retired in 1994 after more than 30 years of service, disassembled and moved to a spot near Plaza Surabaya before being reassembled and turned into a museum which opened in 1998.

== Gallery ==
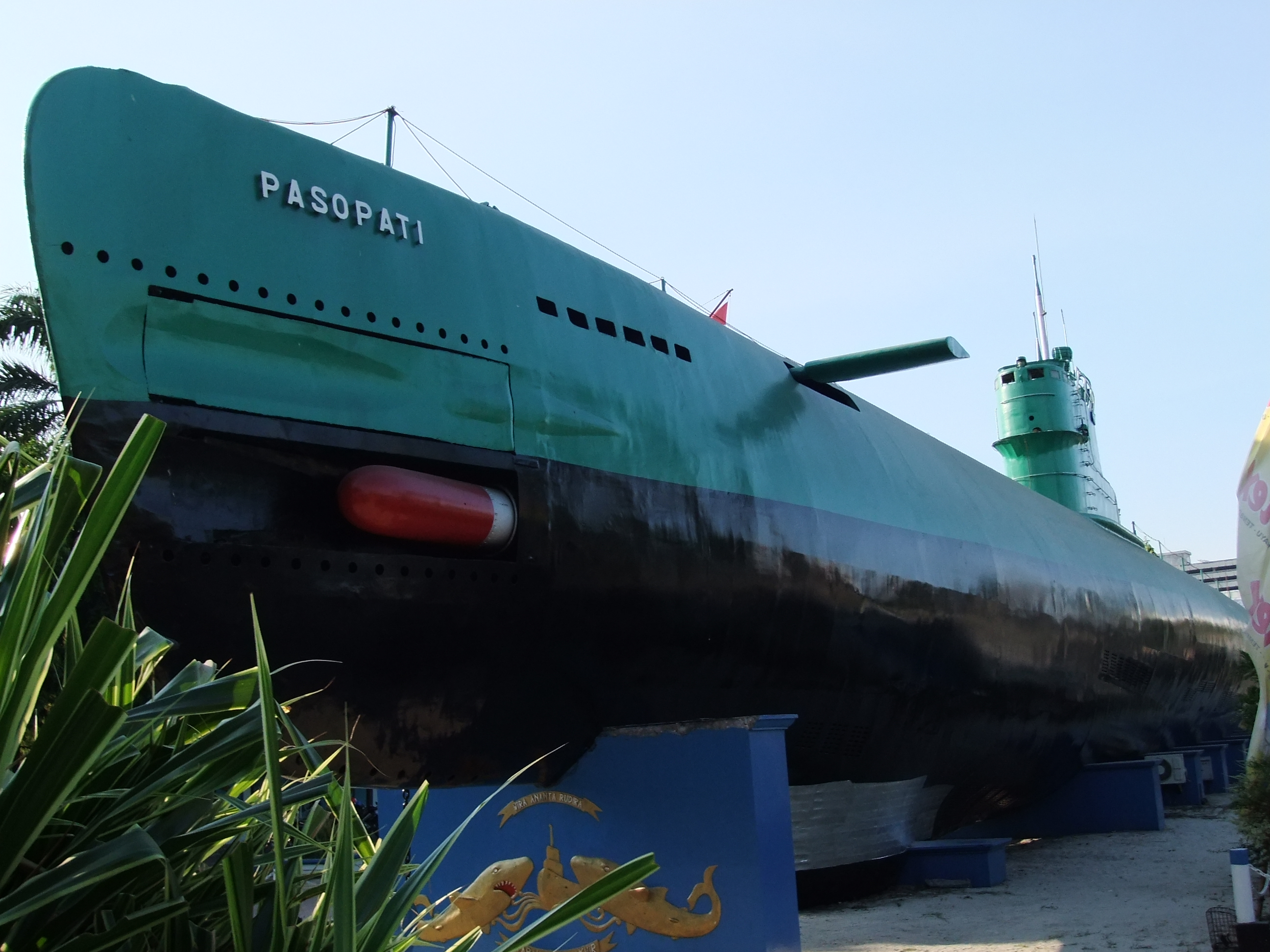

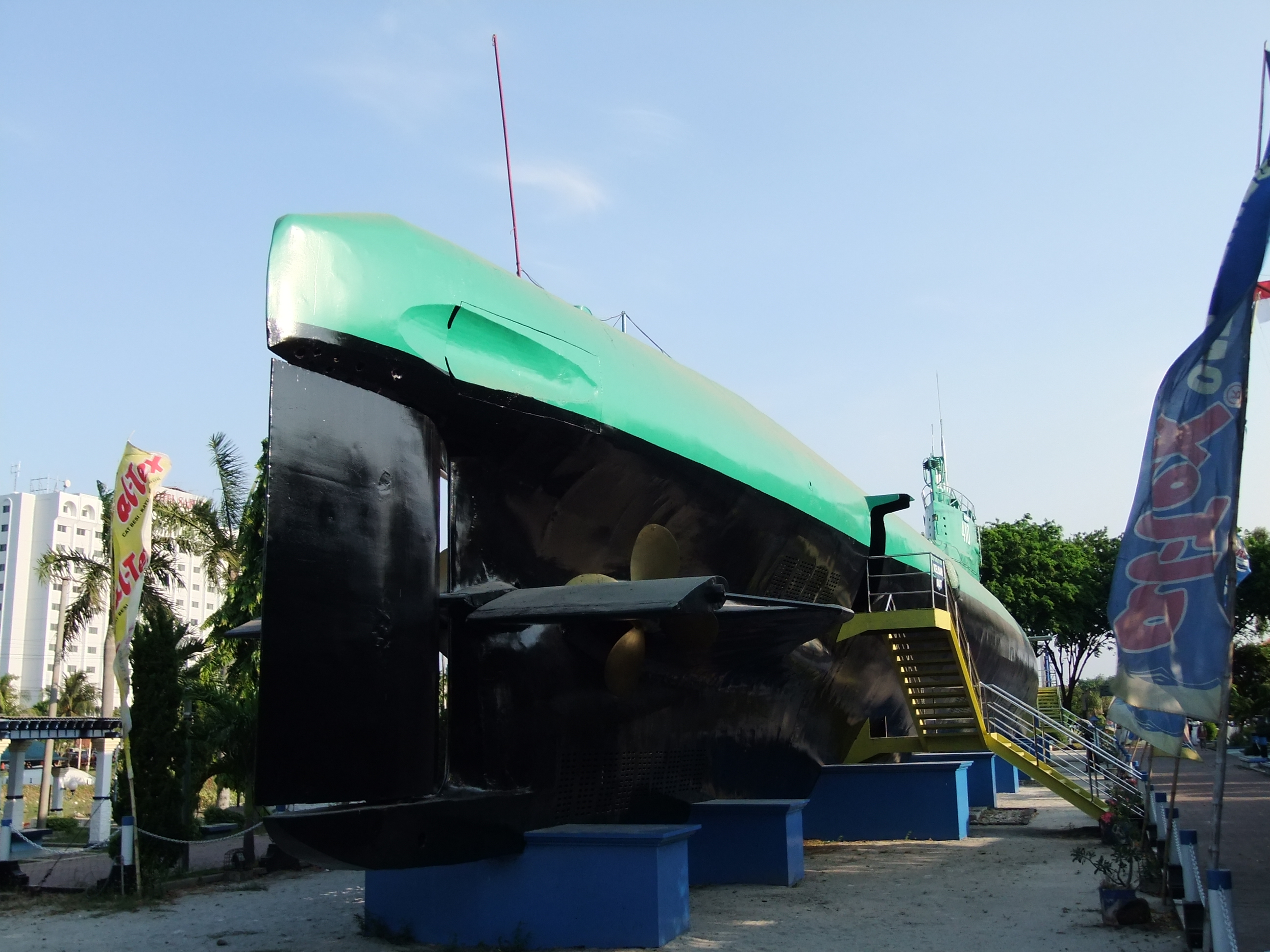

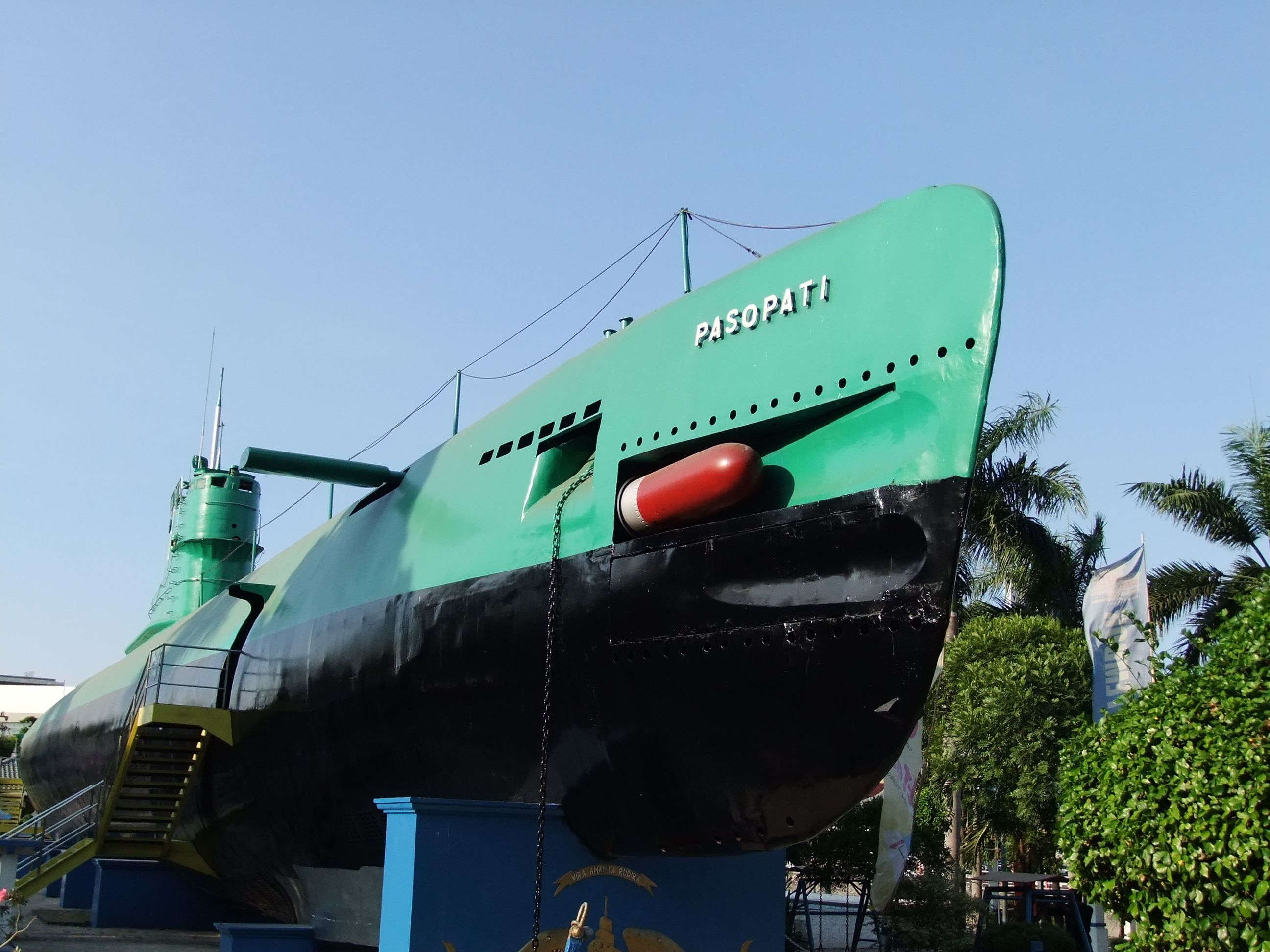

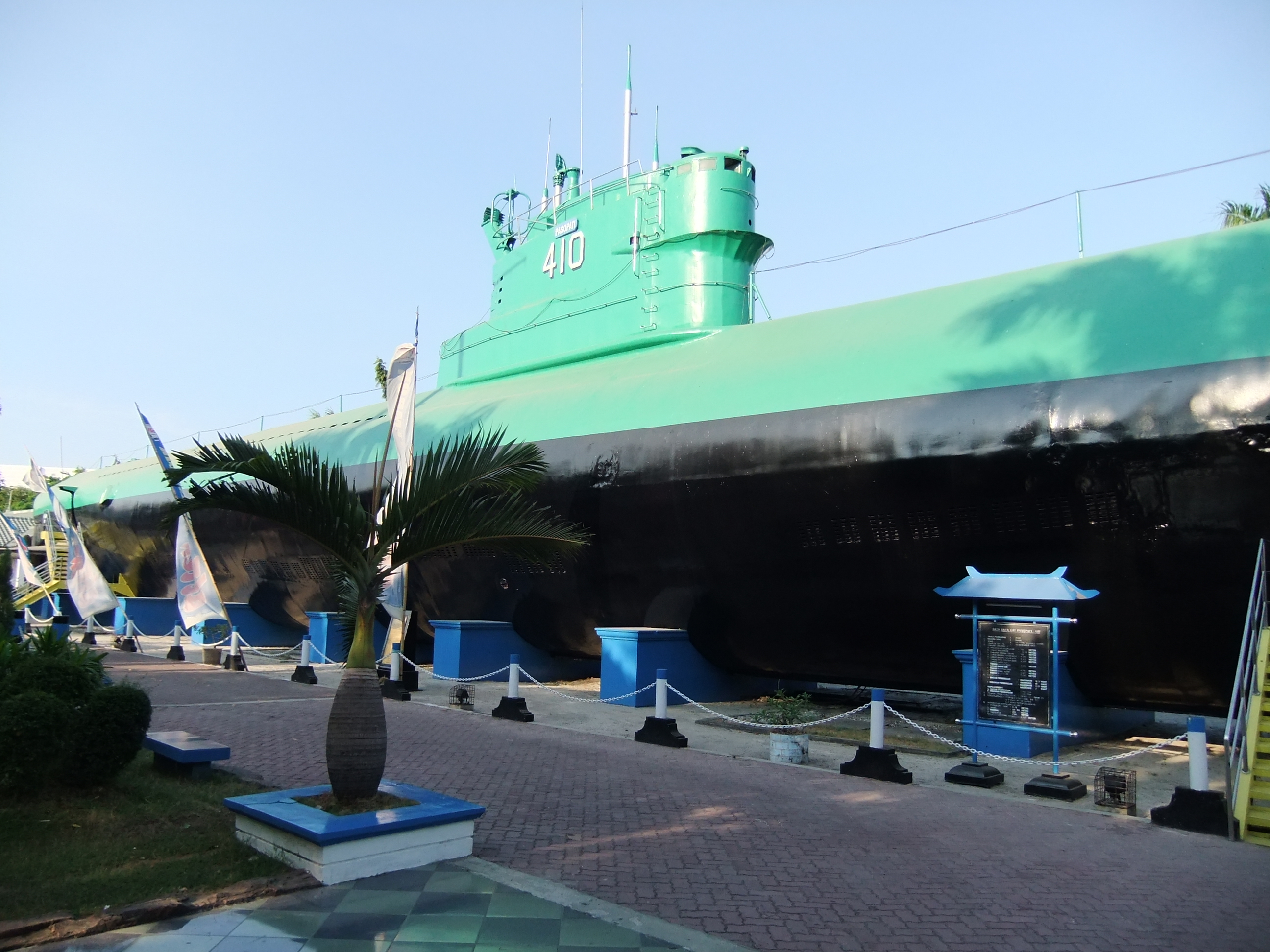

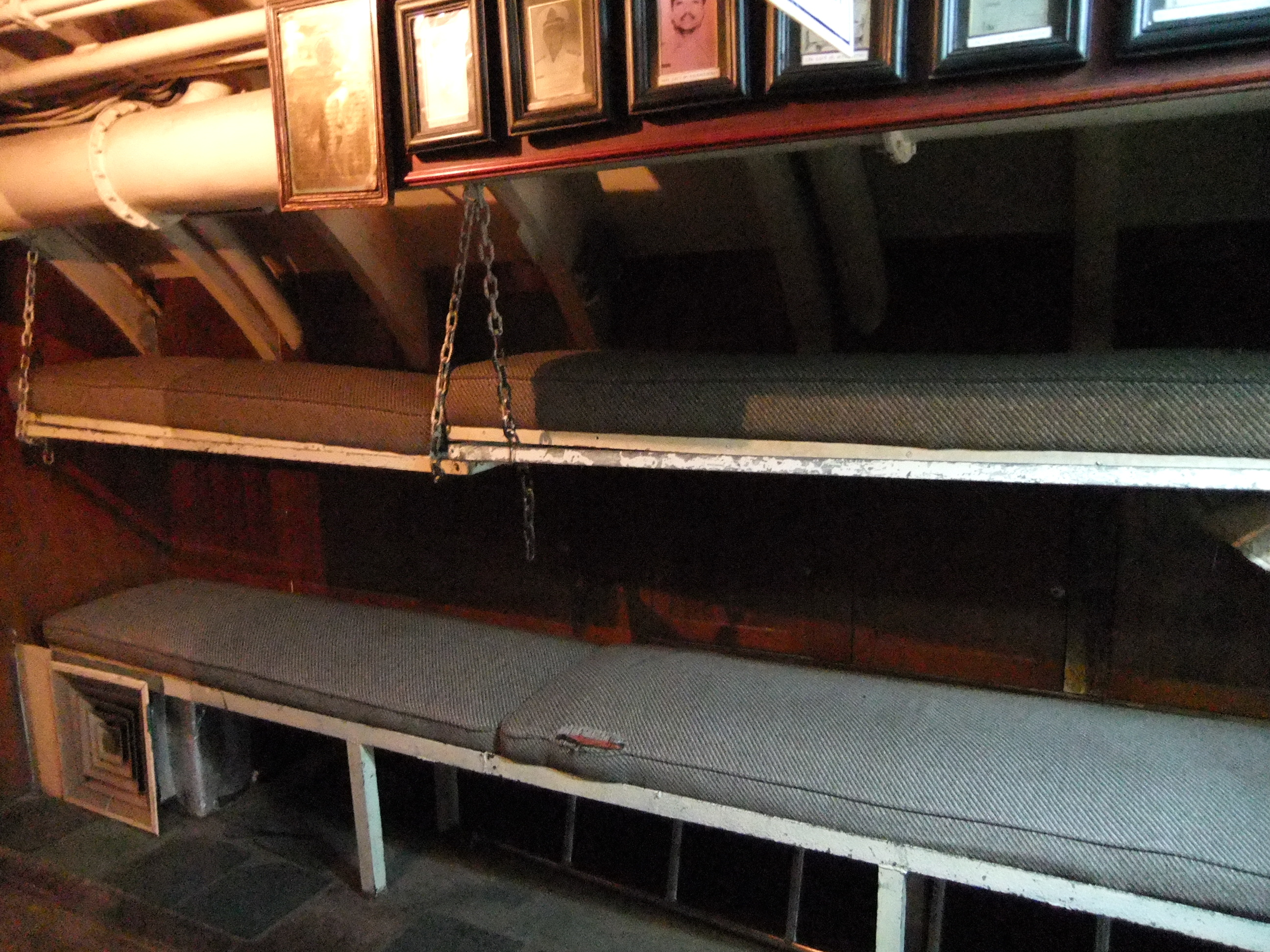

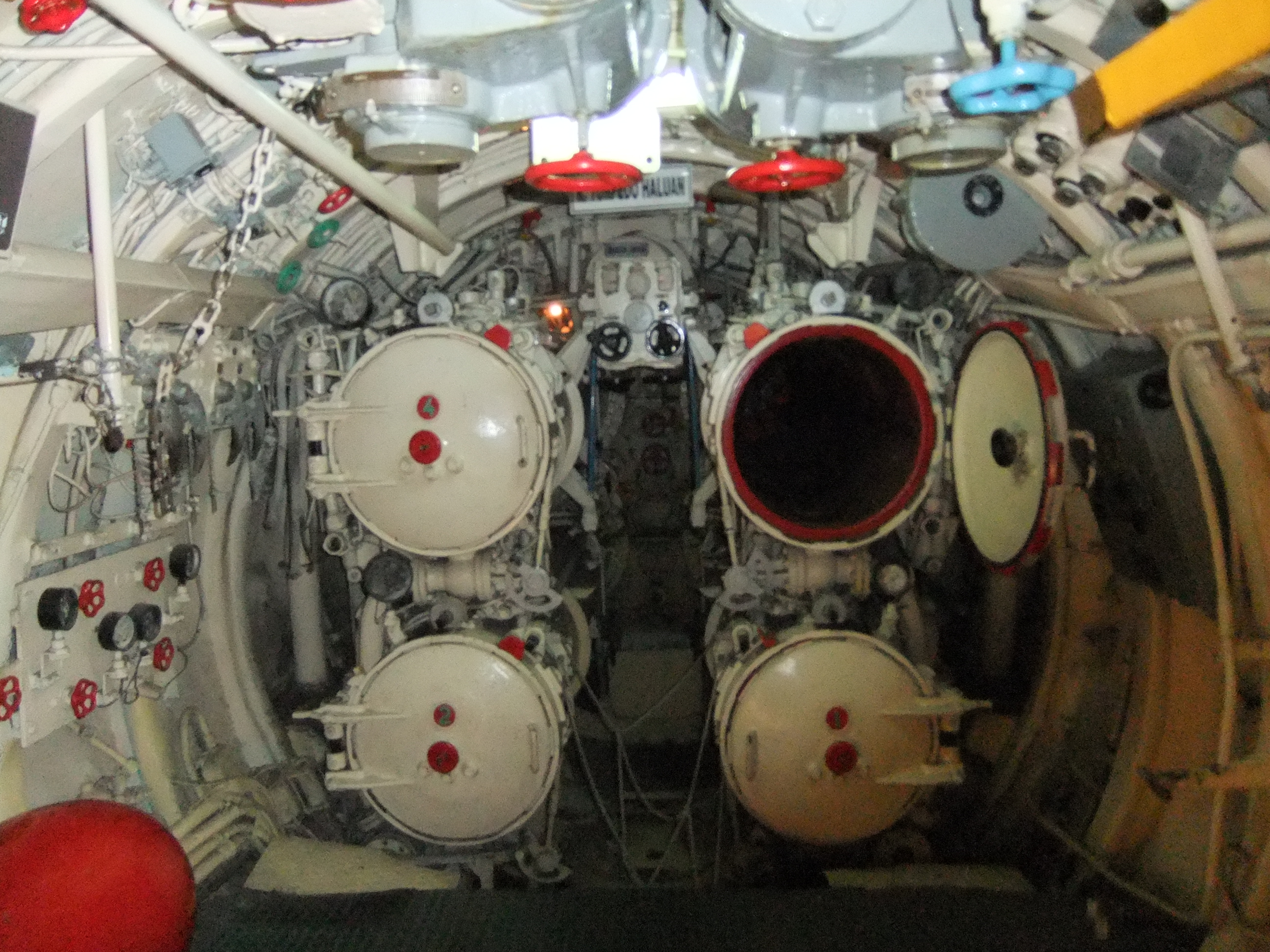

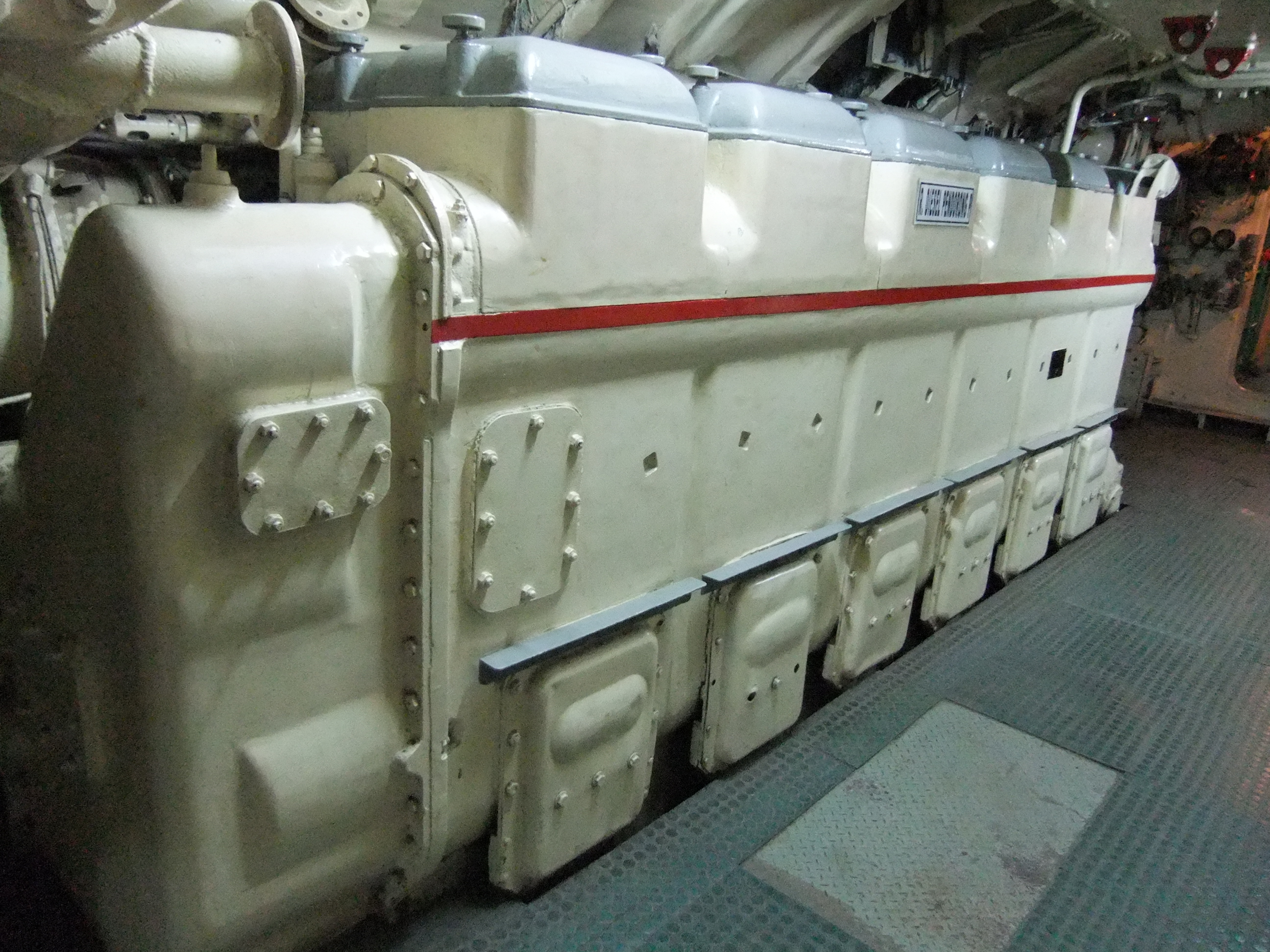

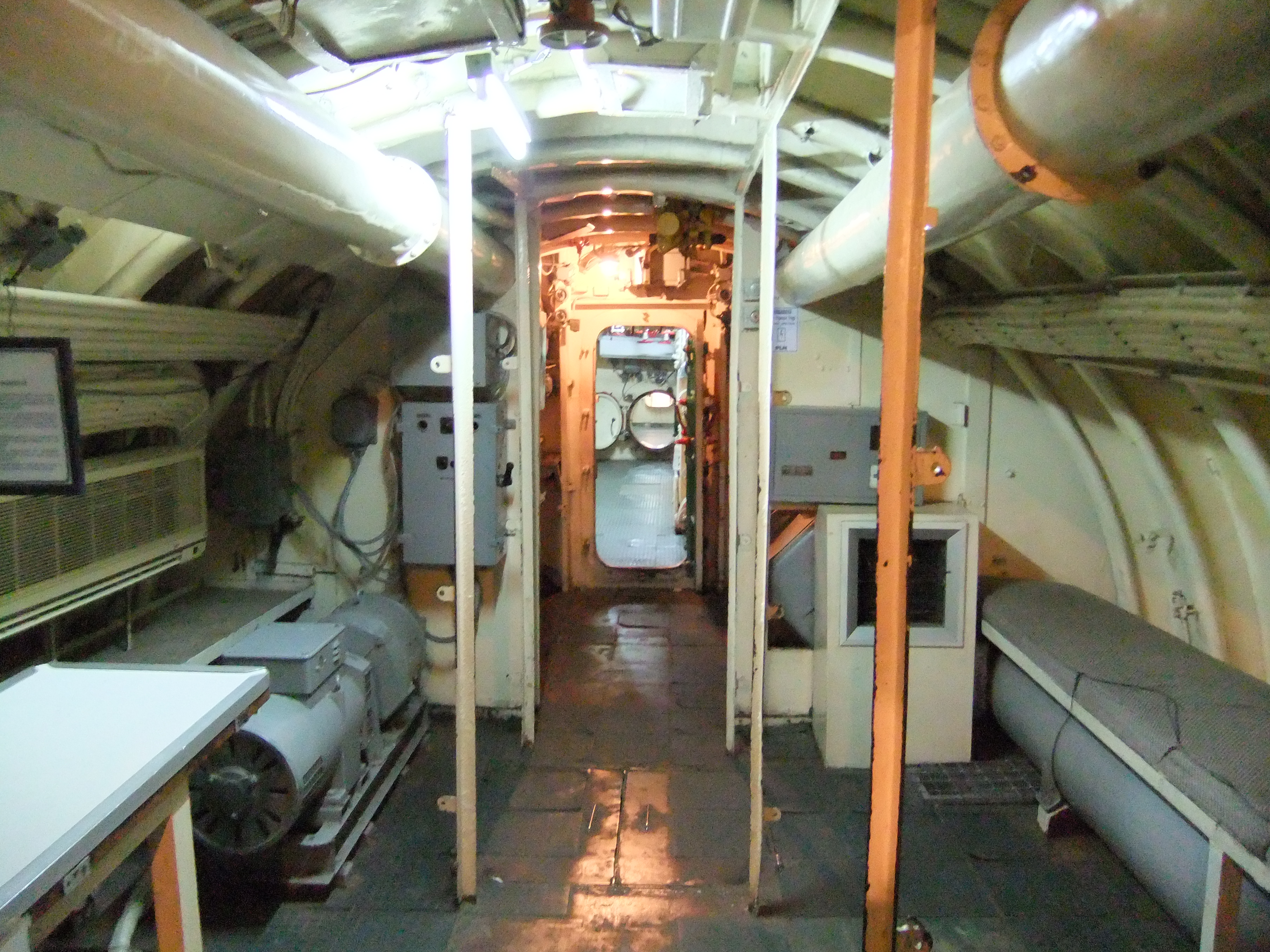

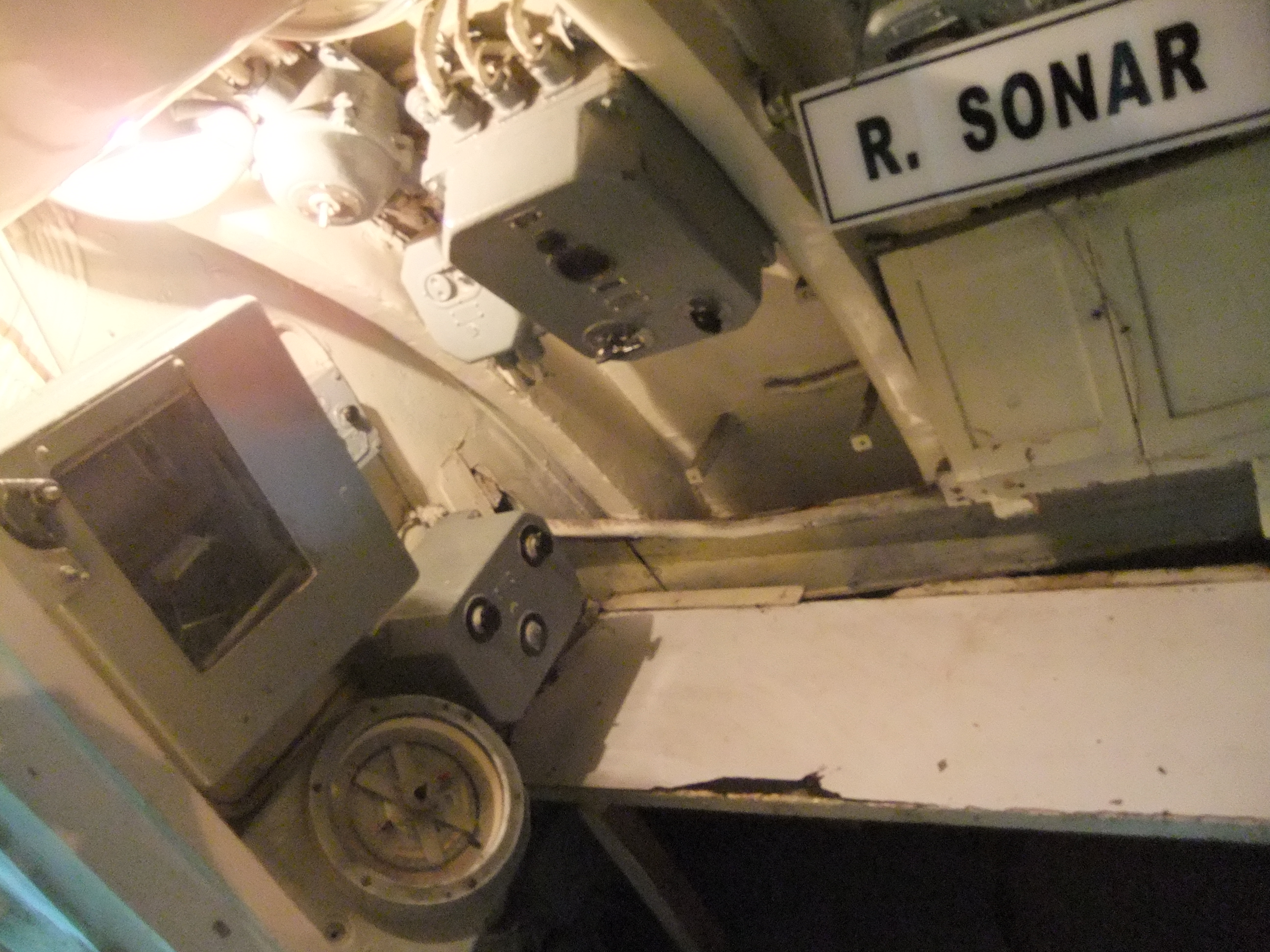

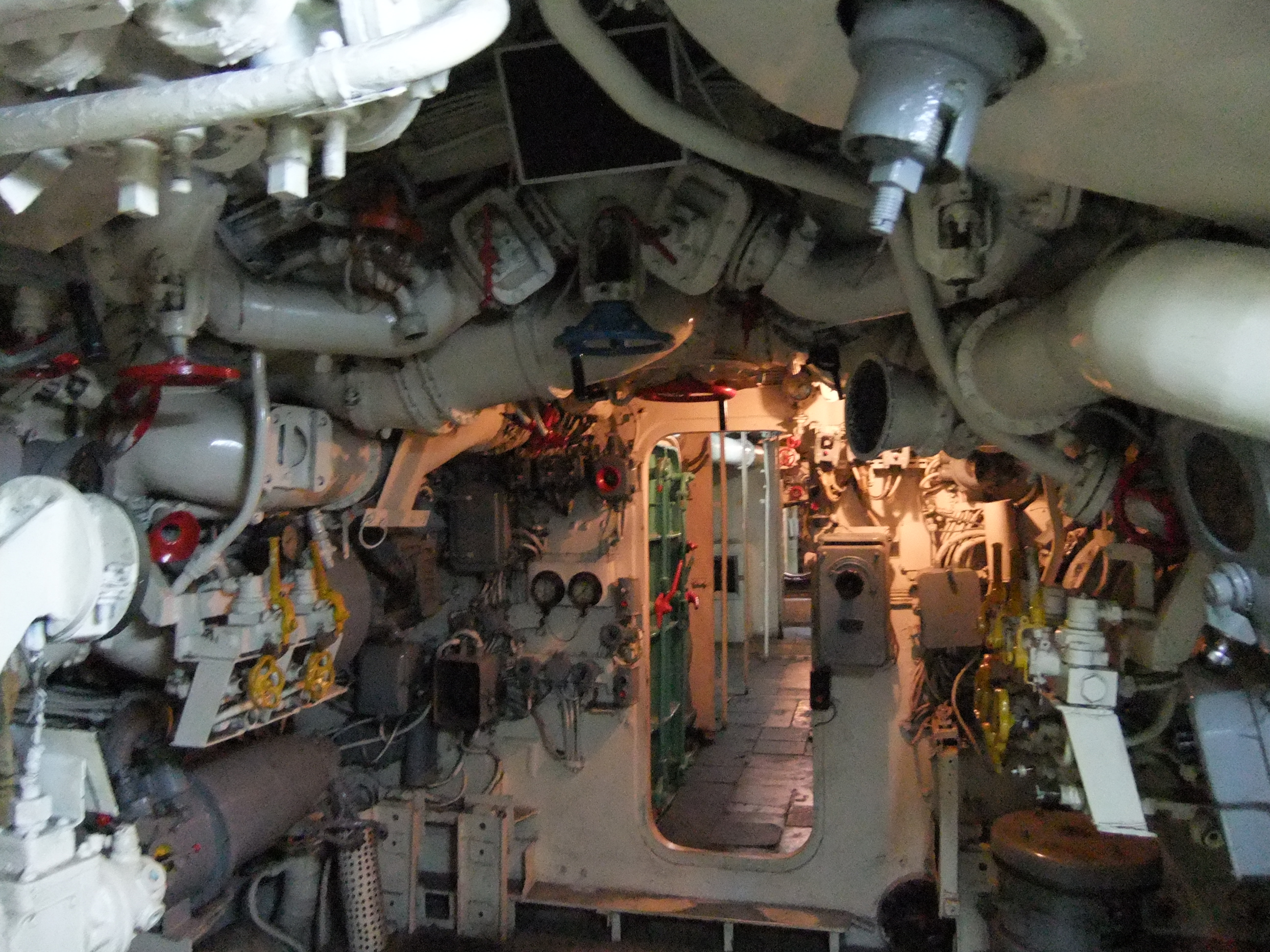

== Bibliography ==
- Friedman, Norman (1995). "Soviet Union 1947–1991: Russian Federation and Successor States 1991–". In Chumbley, Stephen (ed.). Conway's All the World's Fighting Ships 1947–1995. Naval Institute Press. pp. 337–426. ISBN 1-55750-132-7.
- Pavlov, A. S. (1997). Warships of the USSR and Russia 1945–1995. Annapolis, Maryland: Naval Institute Press. ISBN 1-55750-671-X.
- Polmar, Norman & Moore, Kenneth J. (2004). Cold War Submarines: The Design and Construction of U.S. and Soviet Submarines. Potomac Books. ISBN 978-1-57488-594-1.
- Polmar, Norman & Noot, Jurrien (1991). Submarines of the Russian and Soviet Navies, 1718–1990. Naval Institute Press. ISBN 0-87021-570-1.
- Zubkov, Dmitry (2025). Whiskey-class Submarines: Soviet Project 613 Submarines in Service with Foreign Navies, 1950–1990. Technology @ War. Vol. 9. Helion. ISBN 978-1-804515-61-7.
