= ORP Bielik (1965) =

Polish submarine

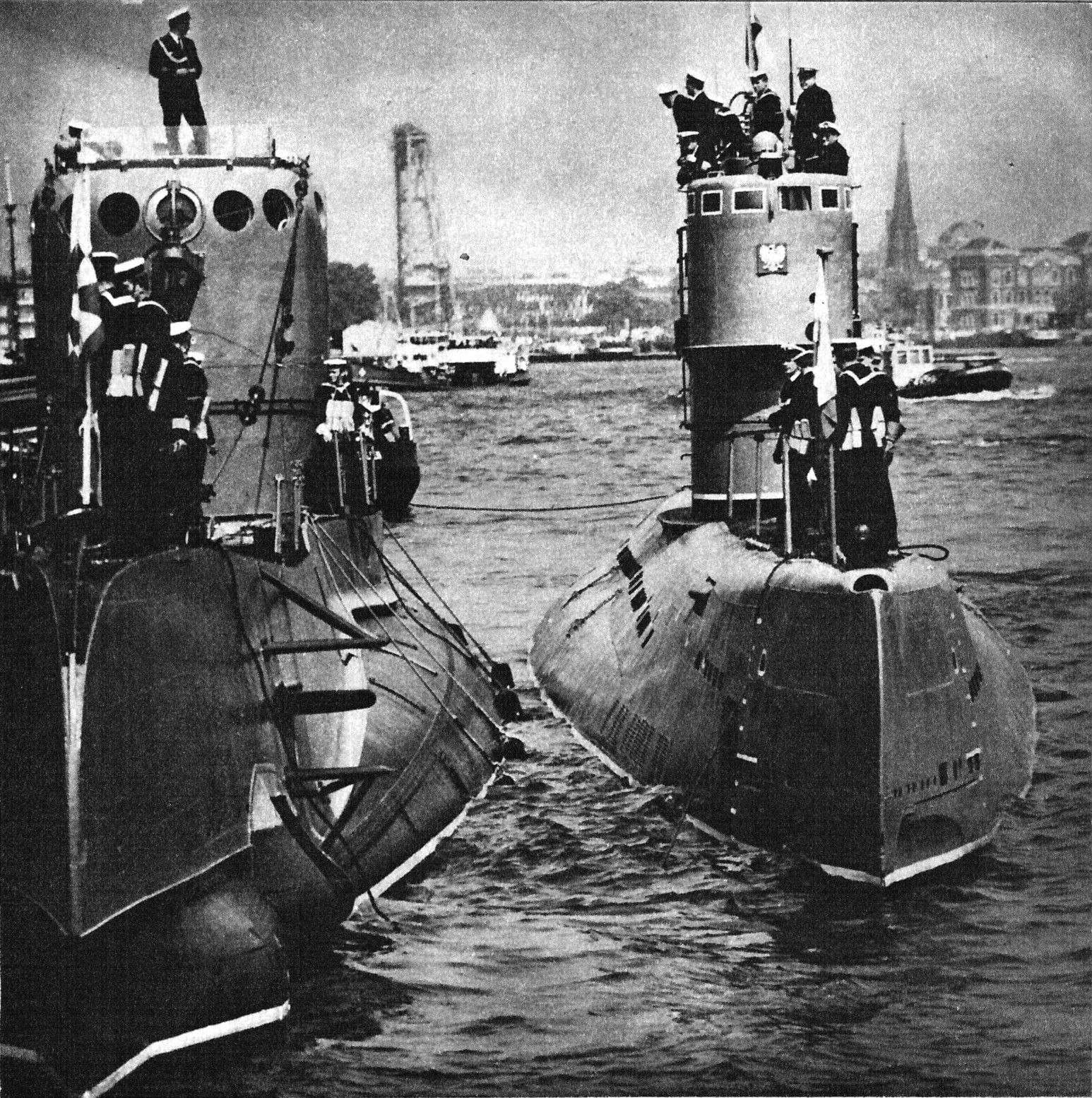
ORP Bielik

ORP Bielik (295) was a Whiskey-class submarine of the Polish Navy during the Cold War. It was one of the four Whiskey-class submarines operated by the Polish Navy, the other three being ORP Orzeł (292), ORP Sokół (293) and ORP Kondor (294). The submarine was launched in the Soviet Union in 1955 where it served as S-279. In 1965 the ship entered Polish service where it served under the pennant number 295, and was active until 1988.

== Bibliography ==
- Friedman, Norman (1995). "Soviet Union 1947–1991: Russian Federation and Successor States 1991–". In Chumbley, Stephen (ed.). Conway's All the World's Fighting Ships 1947–1995. Annapolis, Maryland: Naval Institute Press. pp. 337–426. ISBN 1-55750-132-7.
- Pavlov, A. S. (1997). Warships of the USSR and Russia 1945–1995. Annapolis, Maryland: Naval Institute Press. ISBN 1-55750-671-X.
- Polmar, Norman & Moore, Kenneth J. (2004). Cold War Submarines: The Design and Construction of U.S. and Soviet Submarines. Washington, D. C.: Potomac Books. ISBN 978-1-57488-594-1.
- Polmar, Norman & Noot, Jurrien (1991). Submarines of the Russian and Soviet Navies, 1718–1990. Annapolis, Maryland: Naval Institute Press. ISBN 0-87021-570-1.
