= Russian destroyer Admiral Spiridonov =

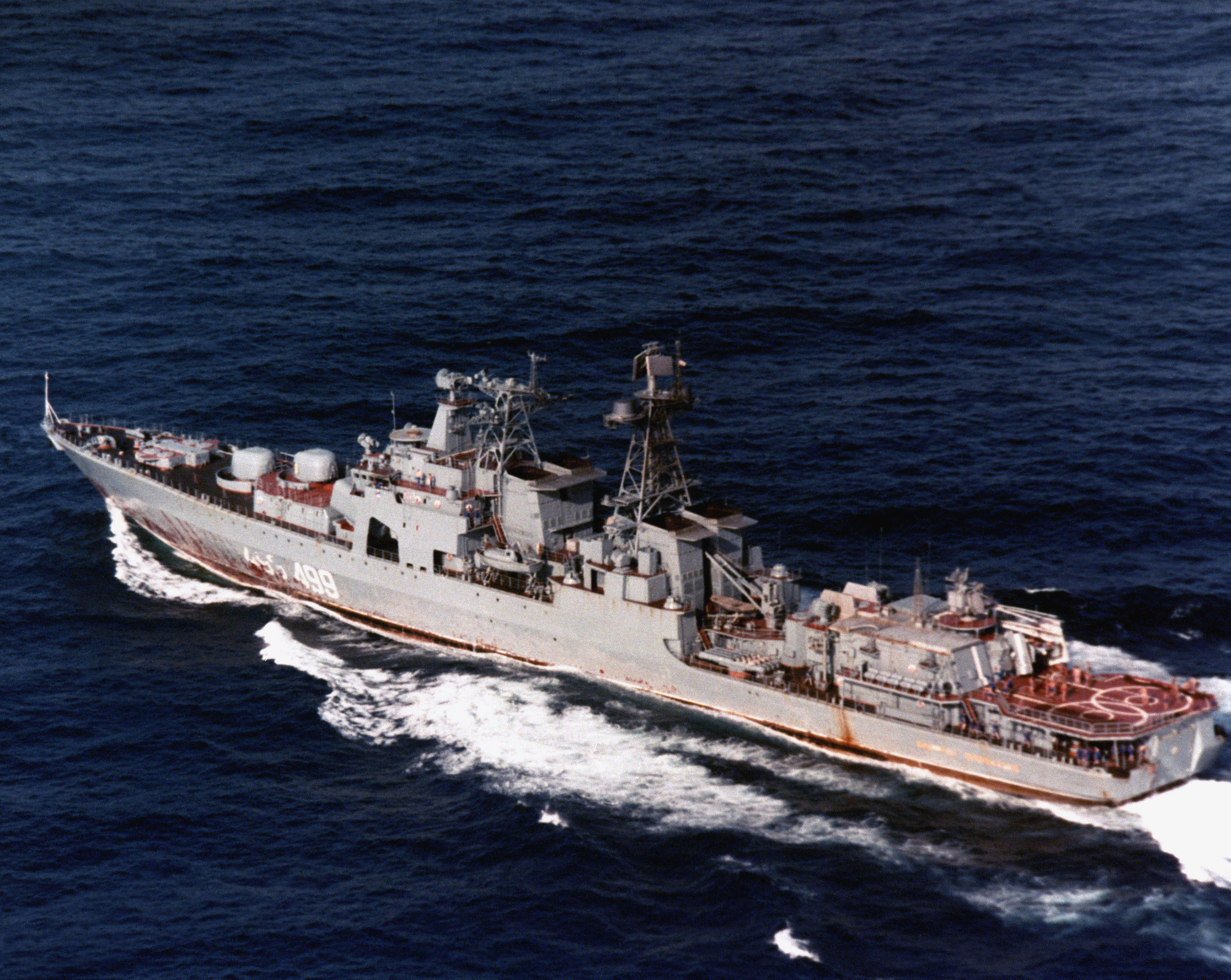
- Admiral Spiridonov in 1986

History

Russia
- Name: Admiral Spiridonov
- Namesake: Emil Spiridonov
- Builder: Yantar Shipyard, Kaliningrad
- Yard number: 113
- Laid down: 11 April 1982
- Launched: 28 April 1984
- Commissioned: 30 December 1984
- Decommissioned: 20 July 2001
- Identification: BPK
- Fate: Scrapped

General characteristics
- Class & type: Udaloy-class destroyer
- Displacement: 6,200 t (6,102 long tons) standard; 7,900 t (7,775 long tons) full load
- Length: 163 m (535 ft)
- Beam: 19.3 m (63 ft)
- Draught: 7.8 m (26 ft)
- Propulsion: 2 shaft COGAG, 4 gas turbines, 92,000 kW (124,000 hp)
- Speed: 35 knots (65 km/h; 40 mph)
- Range: 10,500 nautical miles (19,400 km) at 14 knots (26 km/h; 16 mph)
- Complement: 318
- Sensors & processing systems: Radar: MR-760MA Fregat-MA/Top Plate 3-D air search radar and MR-320M Topaz-V/Strut Pair air/surface search radar; Sonar: MGK-355 Polinom sonar complex; Fire Control: 2 MR-360 Podkat/Cross Sword ASW control, 2 K-12-1/Hot Flash SAM control
- Electronic warfare & decoys: 2 × PK-2M decoy RL
- Armament: 2 × quadruple URPK-3 Metel anti submarine missiles; 8 × vertical launchers for 3K95 Kinzhal surface to air missiles; 2 × single 100 mm (3.9 in) guns; 4 × 30 mm (1.2 in) AK-630 Gatling guns; 2 × quadruple 553 mm (21.8 in) CHTA-53-1155 torpedo tubes, Type 53-65K, SET-65 ASW/ASuW torpedo; 2 × RBU-6000 anti submarine rocket launchers
- Aircraft carried: 2 x Ka-27 'Helix' series helicopters
- Aviation facilities: Helicopter deck and hangar

Admiral Spiridonov (Адмирал Спиридонов) was a Project 1155 Fregat Large Anti-Submarine Ship (Большой Противолодочный Корабль, BPK), known in the west as an Udaloy-class destroyer. The ship was named after Emil Spiridonov, a Soviet admiral who died in 1981. Launched in 1984, Admiral Spiridonov served in the Pacific Fleet with the Soviet and Russian Navies successively until being decommissioned in 2001. While in service, the vessel operated in exercises in the Sea of Japan and made good will visits to a number of Soviet allies during the latter part of the Cold War in Africa and Asia.

== Design and development ==
Admiral Spiridonov was the third ship of a class of twelve Project 1155 Fregat (also known as the Udaloy-class). The vessel was designated as a Large Anti-Submarine Ship (Большой Противолодочный Корабль, BPK), in accordance with its primary mission of countering submarines, and a destroyer by NATO.

The vessel was 163 m (534.8 ft) long with a beam of 19.3 m (63.3 ft) and a draught of 7.8 m (25.6 ft). Displacement was 6,200 t (6,102 long tons) standard and 7,900 t (7,775 long tons) full load. Power was provided by four 23,000 kW (31,000 hp) hp GTA M-9 propulsion complexes, each comprising a 6,300 kW (8,500 hp) M-62 and a 16,800 kW (22,500 hp) hp M-8KF powering two fixed pitch propellers. which gave a maximum speed of 29.5 knots (55 km/h; 34 mph). Cruising range was 6,882 nmi (12,745 km; 7,920 mi) at 14 kn (26 km/h; 16 mph) and 4,000 nmi (7,408 km; 4,603 mi) at 18 kn (33 km/h; 21 mph). The ship had a complement of 318, consisting of 37 officers, 45 warrant officers and 234 ratings.

=== Armament ===
To combat submarines, Admiral Spiridonov mounted two quadruple KT-R-1134A URPK-3 launchers for eight 85R missiles in the Metel Anti-Ship Complex along with two RBU-6000 12-barrel rocket launchers for close in defence. The ship was also equipped with two quadruple 553 mm (21.8 in) CHTA-53-1155 torpedo tubes for 53-65K, SET-65 torpedoes. A hangar aft accommodated two Kamov Ka-27 helicopters for anti-submarine warfare. Protection from aircraft was provided with eight 3K95 Kinzhal missiles mounted in vertical launchers supplemented by 100 mm (4 in) AK-100 DP guns and four 30 mm (1.2 in) AK-630 Gatling guns.

=== Electronic warfare ===
The vessel is equipped with the MR-760 Fregat-MA (NATO reporting name 'Top Plate') air/surface search, MR-320V Topaz-V ('Strut Pair') air/surface search and MR-212/201-1 Vaygach-U navigation radars along with MR-350 Podkat ('Cross Sword') and K-12-1 ('Hot Flash') fire control radars. The MGK-355 Polinom sonar complex (combining 'Horse Jaw' bow mounted and 'Horse Tail' variable depth sonars) is complemented by two MG-7 Braslet anti-saboteur sonars and the MG-35 Shtil-2 underwater communication system. Two PK-2M decoy RL are mounted.

== Construction and career ==
Admiral Spiridonov was laid down on 11 April 1982 by Yantar Shipyard of Kaliningrad with shipyard number 113, launched on 28 April 1983 and commissioned on 30 December 1984. The ship was named after Emil Spiridonov, who had commanded the Soviet Pacific Fleet until his death in 1981.

On 1 March 1985, Admiral Spiridonov joined the 183rd Anti-Submarine Warfare Brigade. Between 21 August and 22 November 1985, the vessel sailed from Liepāja to Vladivostok to join the Pacific Fleet with Admiral Nakhimov, Frunze and Osmotritelnyy, visiting Luanda, Angola, Maputo, Mozambique, Aden, South Yemen and Cam Ranh Bay, Vietnam, along the way. On 16 June 1986, the vessel joined exercises in the Sea of Japan followed by a visit to Wonsan, North Korea, and then operations in the Indian Ocean and Persian Gulf between 1989 and 1991.

On 20 July 2001, the ship was decommissioned and subsequently scrapped.

== Pennant numbers ==
Pennant number	Date
409	1984
499	1984
541	1986
563	1987
533	1990
555	1993
