= Soviet submarine S-189 =

Museum ship in Saint Petersburg, Russia

Coordinates: 59.932134°N 30.275432°E

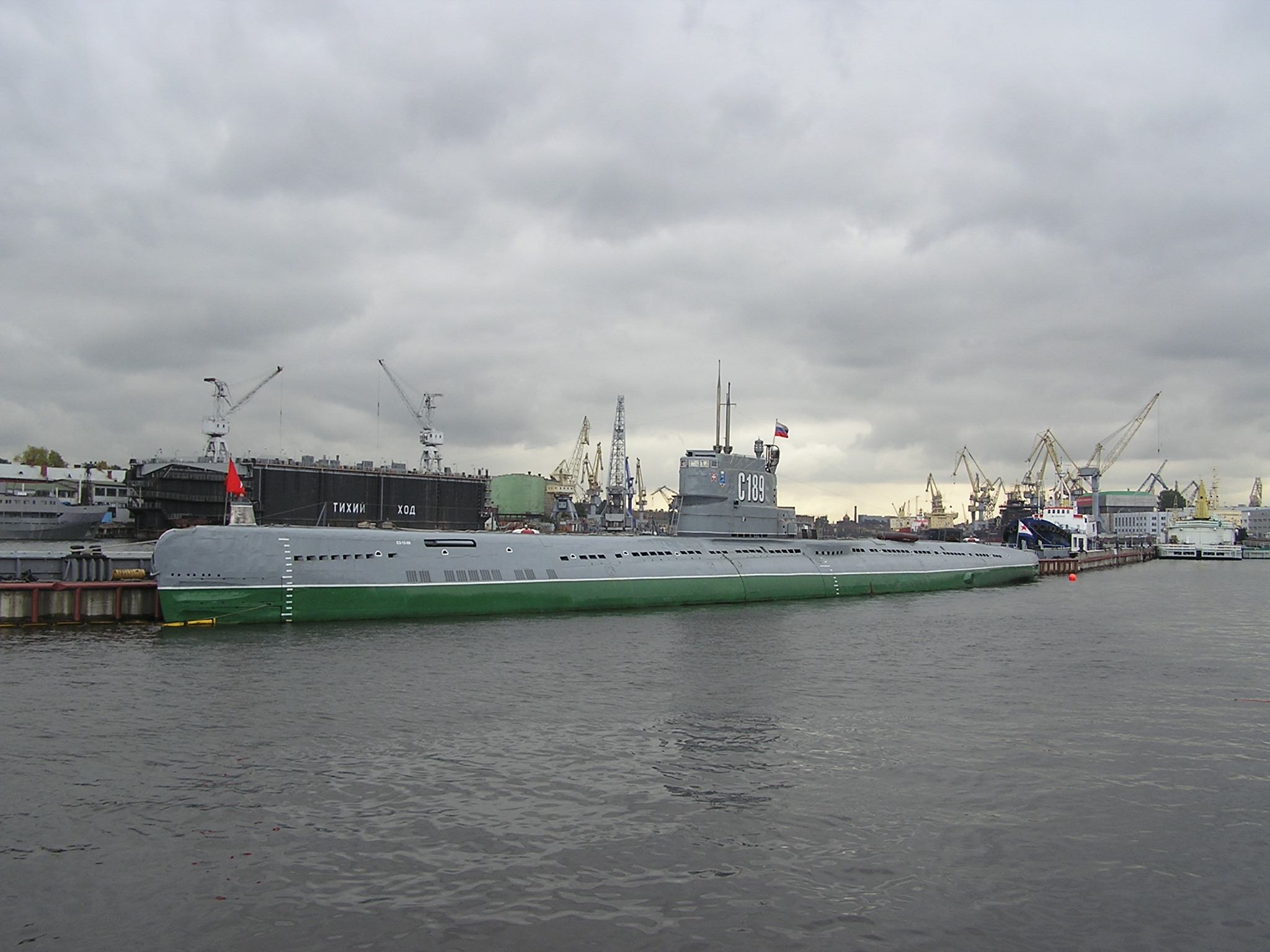
- S-189

History

Soviet Union
- Name: S-189
- Launched: 1954
- Decommissioned: 1990
- Home port: Vladivostok
- Fate: Museum ship in Saint Petersburg

General characteristics
- Class & type: Whiskey-class submarine
- Displacement: 1,080 long tons (1,097 t) surfaced; 1,350 long tons (1,372 t) submerged
- Length: 76 m (249 ft 4 in)
- Beam: 6.6 m (21 ft 8 in)
- Draught: 4.55 m (14 ft 11 in)
- Propulsion: Diesel-electric
- Speed: 18.3 knots (33.9 km/h) surfaced; 13.1 knots (24.3 km/h) submerged
- Range: 13,000 nmi (24,000 km) at 8 kn (15 km/h) surfaced; 353 nmi (654 km) at 2 kn (3.7 km/h) submerged
- Endurance: 30 days
- Test depth: 170 m (560 ft)
- Complement: 52 officers and men
- Armament: 6 × 530 mm (21 in) torpedo tubes (4 forward, 2 aft); 12 × torpedoes or 22 × mines; 1 × 25 mm (1 in) AA gun

S-189 is a Project 613B (NATO: Whiskey class) diesel submarine of the Soviet Navy.

She is currently preserved as a museum ship in Saint Petersburg.

== Bibliography ==
- Friedman, Norman (1995). "Soviet Union 1947–1991: Russian Federation and Successor States 1991–". In Chumbley, Stephen (ed.). Conway's All the World's Fighting Ships 1947–1995. Annapolis, Maryland: Naval Institute Press. pp. 337–426. ISBN 1-55750-132-7.
- Pavlov, A. S. (1997). Warships of the USSR and Russia 1945–1995. Annapolis, Maryland: Naval Institute Press. ISBN 1-55750-671-X.
- Polmar, Norman & Moore, Kenneth J. (2004). Cold War Submarines: The Design and Construction of U.S. and Soviet Submarines. Washington, D. C.: Potomac Books. ISBN 978-1-57488-594-1.
- Polmar, Norman & Noot, Jurrien (1991). Submarines of the Russian and Soviet Navies, 1718–1990. Annapolis, Maryland: Naval Institute Press. ISBN 0-87021-570-1.
