= Soviet submarine S-80 =

Diesel-electric submarine of the Soviet Navy

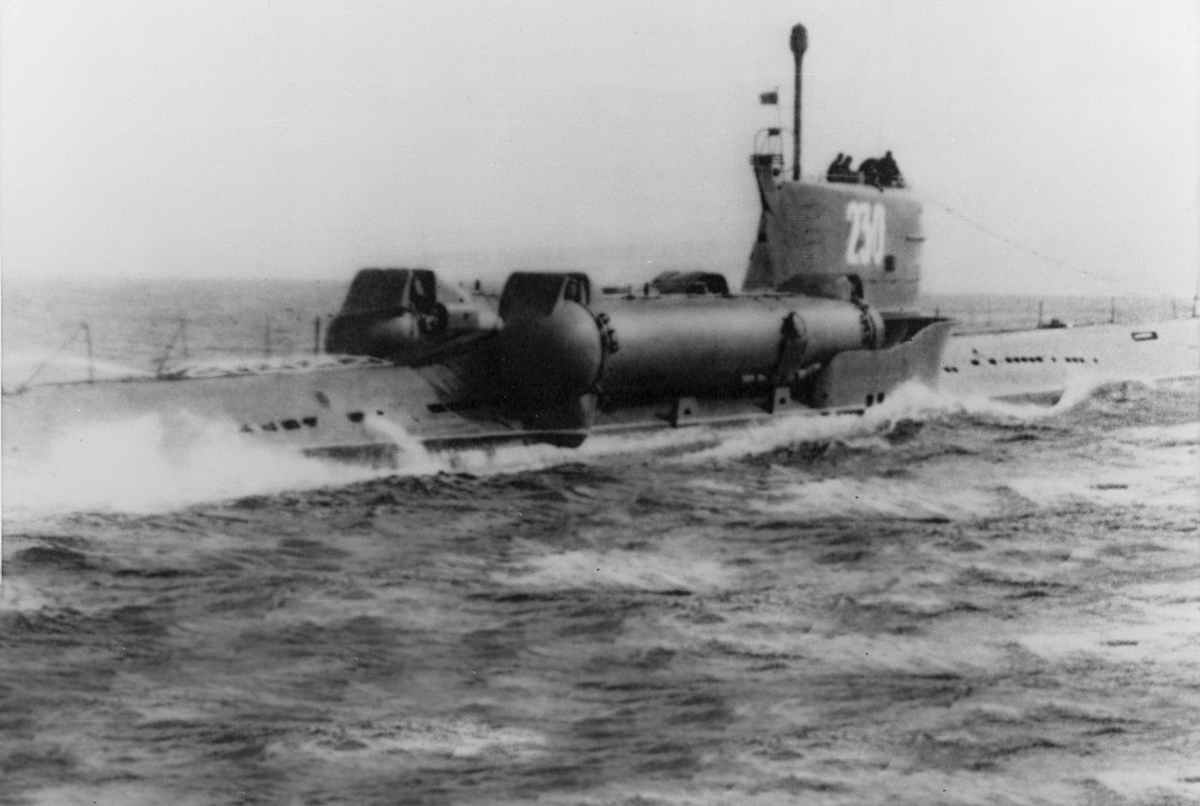
- "Whiskey Twin Cylinder" submarine

History

Soviet Union
- Name: S-80
- Builder: Sormovo yard, Gorkiy
- Laid down: 13 March 1950
- Launched: 21 October 1950
- Commissioned: 2 December 1952
- Fate: Sunk by accidental flooding, 27 January 1961, with loss of all 68 crewmen

General characteristics
- Class & type: Whiskey-class attack submarine
- Displacement: Surfaced: 1,050 tonnes (1,030 long tons); Submerged: 1,340 tonnes (1,320 long tons)
- Length: 76 m (249 ft 4 in)
- Beam: 6.3 m (20 ft 8 in) to 6.5 m (21 ft 4 in)
- Draft: 4.55 m (14 ft 11 in)
- Propulsion: Two-shaft diesel-electric: 2 × 4,000 bhp (3,000 kW) diesel engines; 2 × 2,700 hp (2,000 kW) main electric motors; 2 × 100 hp (75 kW) electric creep motors for silent running
- Speed: Surfaced: 18.25 knots (33.80 km/h); Submerged:13.1 knots (24.3 km/h)
- Range: Surfaced: 8,580 nmi (15,890 km) at 10 knots (19 km/h; 12 mph); Submerged: 335 nmi (620 km) at 3 knots (5.6 km/h; 3.5 mph)
- Endurance: Submerged: 166 h
- Complement: 52
- Armament: 6 × 533 mm (21 in) torpedo tubes (4 bow + 2 stern) for: 12 × torpedoes or, 22 × mines; 1 × single-mounted 25 mm (1.0 in) AA gun; 2 × single-mounted 57 mm (2.2 in) AA gun

S-80 was a diesel-electric submarine of the Soviet Navy.

Its keel was laid down on 13 March 1950 at Krasnoye Sormovo as a Project 613 unit (NATO : Whiskey class). It was launched on 21 October, and delivered to Baku on the Caspian Sea on 1 November for tests, then transferred north via inland waterways in December. It was commissioned into the Northern Fleet on 2 December 1952, and operated there until mid-1957.

Beginning in July 1957, S-80 was overhauled at Severodvinsk and converted to Project 644 ("Whiskey Twin-Cylinder") guided missile submarine, by having launch tubes for two SS-N-3 Shaddock anti-ship missiles fitted externally. It returned to sea in April 1959.

== Sinking ==
During the night of 26 January 1961, S-80 was operating in the Barents Sea at snorkel depth on its diesel engines. The ocean was at sea state 6 and air temperature was −5 °C (23 °F). At 01:27 on 27 January, the boat dropped below snorkel depth, which should have caused the automatic snorkel valve to shut, preventing water from entering the snorkel system. However, the de-icing system that should have warmed the valve with hot water from the diesel engines had been switched off, and the valve had become jammed with ice.

The diesel engines failed immediately as seawater flooded their air intakes. The machinist in the fifth compartment who discovered the flooding became confused by the complex array of valves, and did not shut the ventilation flapper valve quickly enough. By the time he located the correct handwheel, the valve spindle had been bent by the force of the flooding water. As the compartment filled, the boat's trim became uncontrollable.

As its up-angle passed 45 degrees, the boat slowed, coming to a halt and then falling backward, gathering sternway and sinking until it grounded. The second, third, and fourth compartments were crushed, though 24 crewmen survived in the after compartments. Their attempts to escape the wrecked submarine using IDA-51 apparatuses failed, and all 68 officers and men of S-80 were lost. Their fate remained unknown for seven and a half years.

== Recovery ==
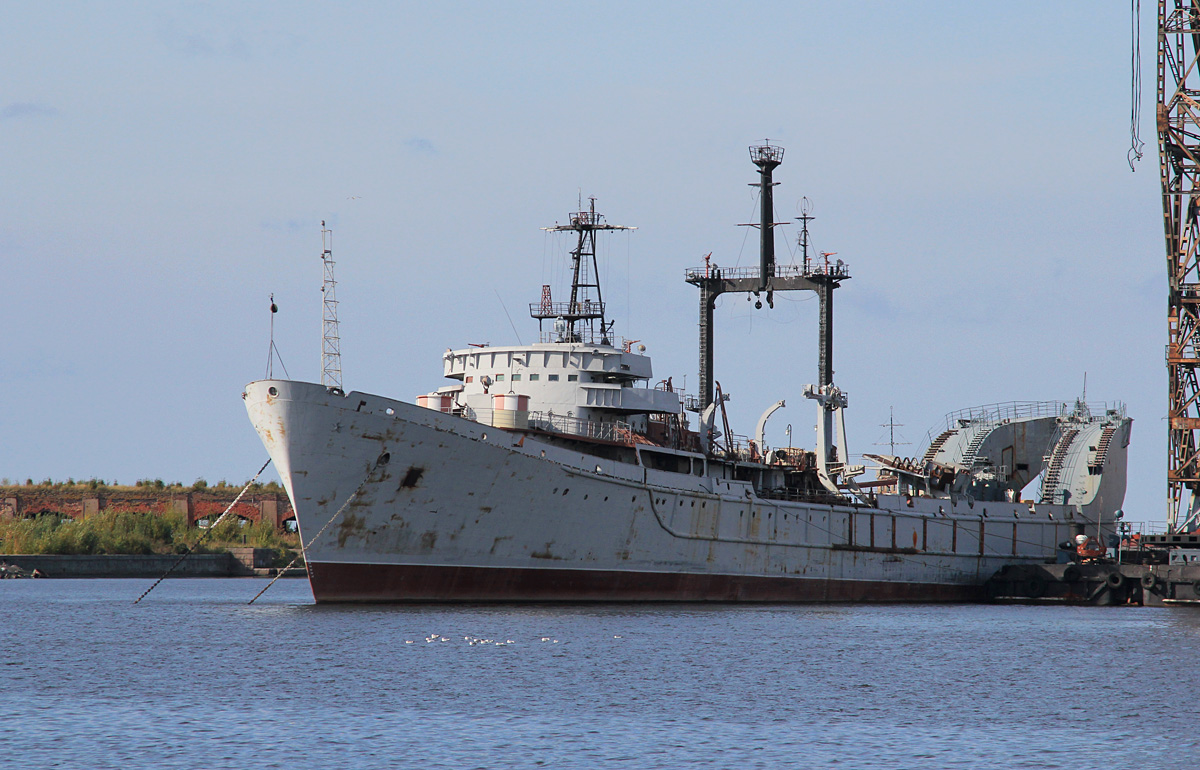
Special purpose vessel Karpaty scrapped by Demag floating crane PK-51100 in Kronstadt in 2010

On 23 June 1968, salvage vessel Altay discovered the wreck of a submarine at 70°01′23″N 36°35′22″E, at a depth of 196 m (643 ft). The crew inspected the wreck with its bathyscape and identified it as S-80.

A government commission studied the report and ordered Operation "Depth," the salvage of the wreck. The Nikolayevsk Shipyard built Karpaty, a special salvage vessel equipped to raise the sunken submarine.

Operation "Depth" was carried out by a task force of the Northern Fleet consisting of groups of trawlers and a destroyer under the command of Captain First Rank S. Minchenko. The wreck was lifted from the ocean floor on 9 June 1969 and transported to Mys Teriberskiy, suspended under Karpaty in slings. There, it was lowered to the bottom of Zavalishin Harbor at a depth of 51 m (167 ft) on 12 July.

On 24 July 1969, S-80 was raised to the surface. During August, a government commission began studying the wreck under the management of Hero of the Soviet Union Vice Admiral Grigory Shchedrin. The commission determined not only the immediate causes of the boat's loss, but also that two further errors had compounded the accident: the crew never attempted to shift propulsion to the electric motors, and they never performed an emergency ballast tank blow.

== Bibliography ==
- Friedman, Norman (1995). "Soviet Union 1947–1991: Russian Federation and Successor States 1991–". In Chumbley, Stephen (ed.). Conway's All the World's Fighting Ships 1947–1995. Annapolis, Maryland: Naval Institute Press. pp. 337–426. ISBN 1-55750-132-7.
- Hampshire, Edward (2018). Soviet Cruise Missile Submarines of the Cold War. London: Osprey Publishing. ISBN 978-1-47282-499-8.
- Pavlov, A. S. (1997). Warships of the USSR and Russia 1945–1995. Annapolis, Maryland: Naval Institute Press. ISBN 1-55750-671-X.
- Polmar, Norman & Moore, Kenneth J. (2004). Cold War Submarines: The Design and Construction of U.S. and Soviet Submarines. Washington, D. C.: Potomac Books. ISBN 978-1-57488-594-1.
- Polmar, Norman & Noot, Jurrien (1991). Submarines of the Russian and Soviet Navies, 1718–1990. Annapolis, Maryland: Naval Institute Press. ISBN 0-87021-570-1.
- Vilches Alarcón, Alejandro A. (2022). From Juliettes to Yasens: Development and Operational History of Soviet Cruise-Missile Submarines. Europe @ War (22). Warwick, UK: Helion & Co. ISBN 978-1-915070-68-5.
