= Whiskey-class submarine =

Early Cold War Soviet ship class

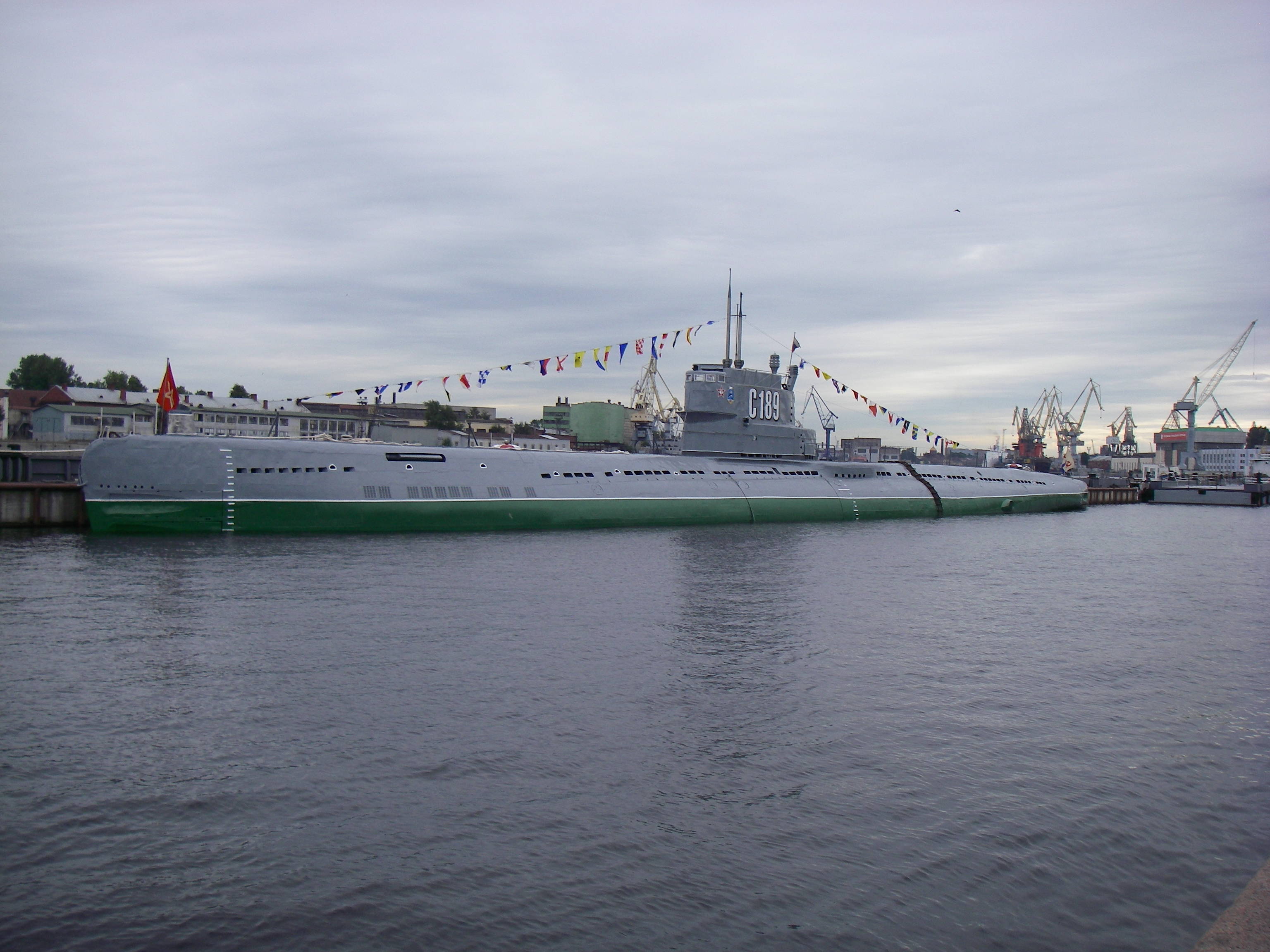
- S-189 preserved and on display as a museum boat in Saint Petersburg

Class overview
- Operators: See operators
- Preceded by: Srednyaya class
- Succeeded by: 633 (patrol variant); 651 (missile variants)
- Built: 1950–1958 (USSR); 1956–1960 (China)
- Completed: 236 (215 in the USSR + 21 in China)
- Preserved: 2

General characteristics (Project 613)
- Type: Diesel–electric attack submarine
- Displacement: Surfaced: 1,050 tonnes (1,030 long tons); Submerged: 1,340 tonnes (1,320 long tons)
- Length: 76 m (249 ft 4 in)
- Beam: 6.3 m (20 ft 8 in) to 6.5 m (21 ft 4 in)
- Draft: 4.55 m (14 ft 11 in)
- Propulsion: Two-shaft diesel–electric: 2 × 2,000 bhp (1,500 kW) diesel engines; 2 × 1,350 hp (1,010 kW) main electric motors; 2 × 50 hp (37 kW) electric creep motors for silent running
- Speed: Surfaced: 18.25 knots (33.80 km/h); Submerged:13.1 knots (24.3 km/h)
- Range: Surfaced: 8,580 nmi (15,890 km) at 10 knots (19 km/h; 12 mph); Submerged: 335 nmi (620 km) at 3 knots (5.6 km/h; 3.5 mph)
- Endurance: Submerged: 166 h
- Complement: 52
- Armament: 6 × 533 mm (21 in) torpedo tubes (4 bow + 2 stern) for: 12 × torpedoes or, 22 × mines; 1 × single-mounted 25 mm (1.0 in) AA gun; 2 × single-mounted 57 mm (2.2 in) AA gun

The Soviet Navy's Projects 613, 640, 644, and 665 (NATO reporting name: Whiskey) are a class of diesel–electric attack submarines that the Soviet Union built in the early Cold War period.

== Design ==
Silhouette of a Whiskey-class submarine with twin 57 mm deck guns and twin 25 mm conning tower guns

Silhouette of a Whiskey Long Bin-class submarine

Silhouette of a Whiskey Twin Cylinder-class submarine

The initial design was developed in the early 1940s as a sea-going follow-on to the S-class submarine. As a result of war experience and the capture of German technology at the end of the war, the Soviet Union issued a new design requirement in 1946. The revised design was developed by the Lazurit Design Bureau, based in Gorkiy. Like most conventional submarines designed between 1946 and 1960, the design was heavily influenced by the World War II German Type XXI U-boat.

=== Patrol variants ===
Between 1949 and 1958 a total of 215 submarines of this type were commissioned into the Soviet Navy. The vessels were initially designed as coastal patrol submarines. These patrol variants are known in the west as Whiskey I, II, III, IV, and V and were called Project 613 in the Soviet Union.

- Whiskey I − twin 25 mm (1.0 in) guns mounted on the conning tower
- Whiskey II − twin 57 mm (2.2 in) guns and twin 25 mm guns
- Whiskey III − guns removed
- Whiskey IV − 25 mm guns and fitted with a snorkel
- Whiskey V − no guns, and a streamlined conning tower and snorkel. Most Whiskey-class were modified to this variant.

=== Missile variants ===
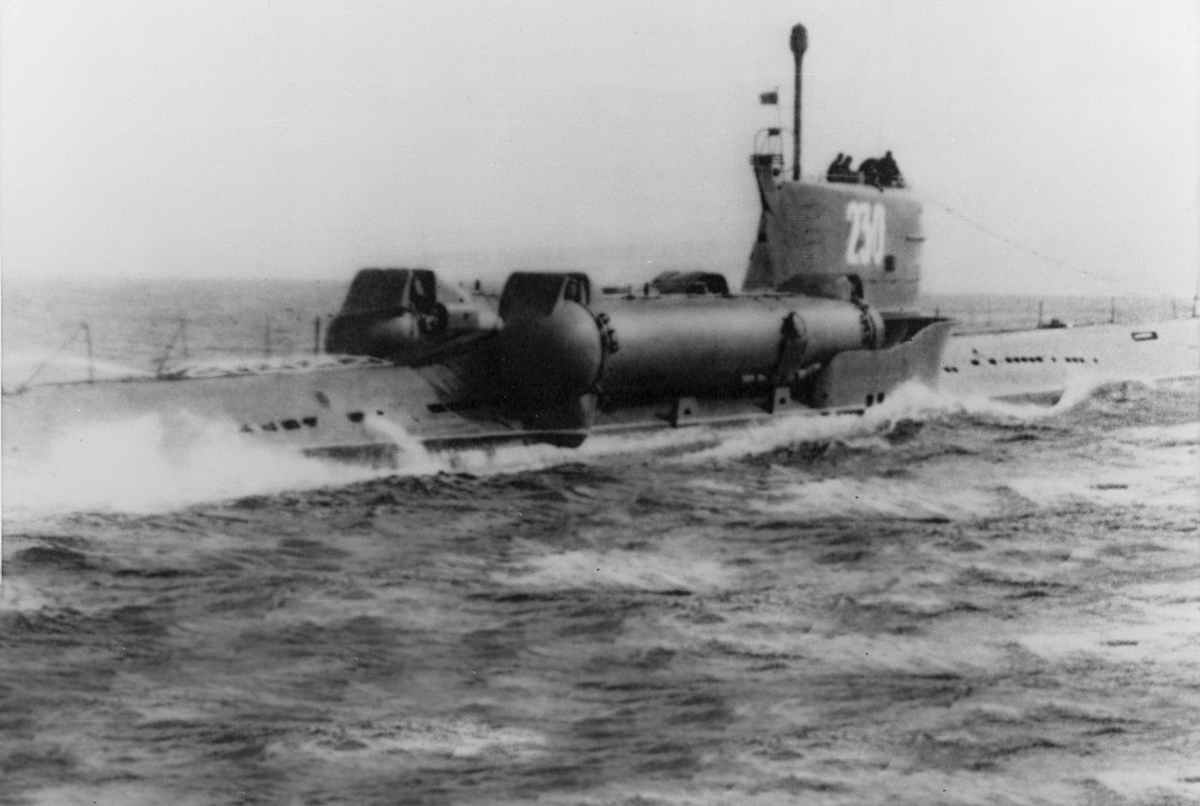
Whiskey Twin Cylinder submarine

In the 1950s and 1960s, some Whiskey submarines were converted to guided-missile submarines, with the capability to fire one to four SS-N-3 Shaddock cruise missiles. In 1956, the first prototype was ready. It was a regular Whiskey-class modified with a launch tube aft of the sail containing a single SS-N-3c. This vessel was known in the West as Whiskey Single Cylinder. Between 1958 and 1960, six additional Whiskey-class submarines were converted to carry guided missiles. These boats had two missile tubes behind the sail, and were known in the west as the Whiskey Twin Cylinder, and Project 644 boats by the Soviets.

Between 1960 and 1963, six boats received an extended sail that could contain four Shaddock missiles. These were called Whiskey Long Bin in the West and Project 665 in the Soviet Union. All guided-missile variants of the Whiskey class carried the P-5 / NATO SS-N-3c Shaddock land-attack missile, and had to surface in order to fire their missiles. The boats of the single- and twin-cylinder classes also had to raise their missile tubes, which were normally positioned horizontally.

The Long Bin boats did not handle well, with the launch tubes causing stability problems, and water flow around the missile fittings was very noisy. All were soon retired from service. Some were converted to Project 640 radar picket boats (called Whiskey Canvas Bag in the West), while others were converted for intelligence-gathering missions. In the Soviet Navy, the patrol variants of this class were replaced by the Romeo class. The guided-missile variants were replaced by the Juliett class.

== Production programme ==
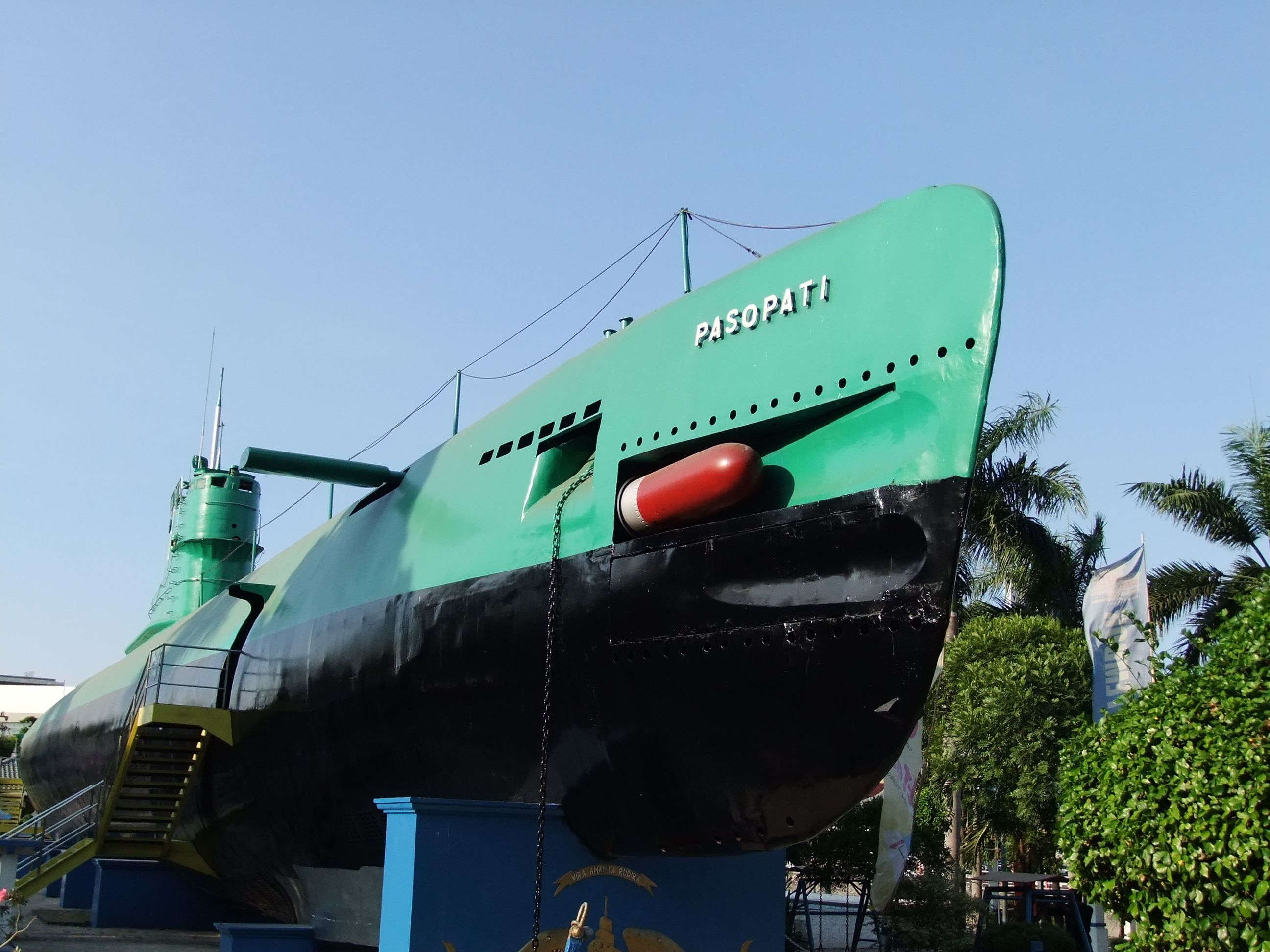
Indonesian Navy Whiskey-class submarine KRI Pasopati, mounted on pedestal in Surabaya riverside

The Soviet Union built a total of 236 or 215 Whiskeys (sources vary; it appears the initial 21 Chinese-built boats are often included with the Soviet boats). Vice Admiral Burov, head of the Soviet Defense Ministry's Shipbuilding Institute from 1969 to 1983, confirms 215 units built.

| Year | Gorkiy | Nikolayev | Baltic | Komsomolsk | Total |
|---|---|---|---|---|---|
| 1951 | 1 | – | – | – | 1 |
| 1952 | 4 | 5 | – | – | 9 |
| 1953 | 19 | 11 | – | – | 30 |
| 1954 | 29 | 14 | – | 1 | 44 |
| 1955 | 37 | 18 | 8 | 4 | 67 |
| 1956 | 26 | 15 | 4 | 4 | 49 |
| 1957 | – | 9 | 3 | 2 | 14 |
| 1958 | – | – | 1 | – | 1 |
| Total | 116 | 72 | 16 | 11 | 215 |

== Operators ==
The Whiskey class had a long service life, with 45 still on the active list of the Soviet Navy in 1982. All Whiskey-class submarines are now decommissioned. (Note: Ross and Bishop make a possible exception for North Korea. According to the IISS, 4 Whiskey-class submarines remained in North Korean inventories until 2004 (listed as possibly unserviceable).)

- Albania − 4 vessels were left behind by the Soviets in 1961 following their expulsion from the country. Only two were operational in 1991. Three were sold as scrap metal while, as of 2022, the Albanian government was considering converting the remaining submarine into a museum ship
- Bulgaria − 2
- China − The Peoples Liberation Army Navy operated up to 26 vessels, known as the Type 6603 or Type 03. 3 or 5 were transferred from the Soviet Union as kits and reassembled in China from the mid-1950s; these may have been Whiskey IVs. The remaining 15 - 21 vessels, were built in China with Soviet components and advisors; these may have been Whiskey Vs.
- Egypt − 7
- Indonesia − The Indonesian Navy operated a total of 12 Whiskey-class submarines with pennant numbers 401 - 412 in the 1960s, with 2 more used for spare parts. The class operated until 1990, when the last vessel, KRI Pasopati (410), was decommissioned and turned into a museum ship in Surabaya, Indonesia.
- North Korea − 4 vessels, remained in the Korean People's Army Navy inventory as late as 2004
- Poland − 4
- Soviet Union − 20 were still in active service in 1991

== Incidents involving Whiskey-class submarines ==
- On 27 January 1961, S-80 was lost due to accidental flooding while the boat was submerged. The valve that should have prevented water from entering the snorkel did not work properly.
- In 1961, when Enver Hoxha decided to expel all Soviet personnel from Albania, four submarines were sabotaged by their former crews before being abandoned. (Note: According to the Military Review, one Whiskey-class was damaged beyond repair and scrapped, a claim that's contradicted by other sources, such as The Statesman's Year-Book.) They were later repaired by Chinese technicians and returned to service in 1964.
- On 24 November 1972, the Kobben-class submarine HNoMS Sklinna of the Royal Norwegian Navy had "contact" with what they presumed was a Whiskey-class submarine, after 14 days of "hunt" in Sognefjord. Military documents released in 2009 confirmed this episode.
- On 21 October 1981, S-178 was run down by the merchant vessel Refrizherator-13 in Golden Horn Bay, Vladivostok.
- On 27 October 1981, S-363 ran aground in Swedish territorial waters near the Karlskrona naval base.
- On 19 June 1984, a Whiskey-class submarine was caught in a fishing-net and surfaced within the Norwegian exclusive economic zone (EEZ).
- On 18 August 1989, S-345 sank while being towed from Paldiski to Tallinn, to be scrapped, it sank at the mouth of the Lohusalu Bay (2.6 miles west of cape Ninamaa).
- On 14 December 1989 a decommissioned Whiskey-class submarine under tow for scrapping in Nakskov was sunk 2 miles (3.2 km) west of Bornholm. Attempts to raise it in 1991 failed and it sank nearby in deeper water.
- On 5 February 2007, the decommissioned S-194 took on water and sank off the coast of Denmark while being towed to become part of a naval museum.
- In 2009 a previously unknown and unidentified sunken Whiskey-class submarine was discovered within Sweden's EEZ close to the island of Gotland. It was a decommissioned submarine which sank while under tow to be scrapped in Denmark. News of the discovery was not made public until March 2011.

== Surviving examples ==
S-189 is preserved as a museum in Saint Petersburg, Russia. KRI Pasopati (ex-S-290) is also preserved as a museum ship in Surabaya, Indonesia. As of 2025, Albania's #105 is still docked at Pasha Liman Base in south Albania. Due to lack of maintenance it is in a deteriorating state. The government however does have plans to turn it into a museum ship.
