= List of Russian military accidents =

This is a list of Russian accidents that befell the Russian Armed Forces after the fall of the Soviet Union in 1991. Accidents have variously been attributed to cutbacks in spending on equipment, the lack of maintenance of hardware, and the theft of parts for sale to criminal gangs due to low pay in the services. For accidents involving the Russian Air Force during the Second Chechen War, see List of Russian aircraft losses in the Second Chechen War.

== 1990s ==
=== 1992 ===
- 7 February - A MiG-29 crashed due to adverse weather conditions on a routine training flight in Dobrinsky District, Lipetsk Oblast. The pilot, Major General Sulom-Bek Oskanov was killed.
- May - The first of a series of five ammunition explosions at Pacific Fleet ammunition storage arsenals that lasted until 2003.

=== 1993 ===
- 24 July – Two Mig-29s of the Russian Air Force collided in mid-air and crashed away from the public during the International Air Tattoo at RAF Fairford, Gloucestershire, England, United Kingdom. No one on the ground sustained any serious injuries, and the two pilots ejected and landed safely.
- 23 August - Some 40 minutes after takeoff from Engels Air Force Base in Saratov Oblast, an An-12 suffered a partial electrical failure followed by engine failure. While performing an emergency landing, it collided with a tree, causing it to crash and catch fire.

=== 1994 ===
- 18 January – After takeoff, an Antonov An-22 reported control problems. The aircraft rolled to the right and crashed near Antonovo, Tver Oblast. Three occupants were seriously injured while seven others were killed.
- 13 July – A An-26 was stolen from Kubinka airbase, Moscow Oblast by an engineer planning to commit suicide. He circled Lyakhovo at 300–2000 feet until the aircraft ran out of fuel and crashed, killing him.
- 5 August – An Antonov An-12 aircraft impacted a hilltop at 140 metres due to poor visibility at Bada, Chita Oblast.
- 1994 – Four conscripts in the Pacific Fleet died of a stomach infection due to malnutrition.

=== 1995 ===
- 22 September – A nuclear submarine had its electricity cut by an electricity company at a naval base due to unpaid bills. The submarine's cooling system ceased to function and the reactor "came close to meltdown".
- 12 December - 2 Su-27s and a Su-27UB of the Russian Knights flight demonstration team crashed into terrain outside of Cam Ranh, Vietnam, killing four team pilots.

=== 1997 ===
- 5 December – Russian Air Force Antonov An-124 Ruslan, RA-82005, delivering two Sukhoi Su-27 Flankers to Vietnam, lost power in both port engines at 200 feet (60 m) on take-off from Irkutsk and crashed into a residential area, killing eight crew, 15 passengers, and 45 on the ground (some accounts list higher ground casualties). The cause was thought to be either contaminated or wrong grade fuel.

=== 1998 ===
- 17 June – A Kamov Ka-50 Hokum crashed at the Army Aviation Combat Training Centre, Torzhok, Tver Oblast, killing Army Major-General Boris Vorobyov.

=== 1999 ===
- 22 April – A Sukhoi Su-24 MR Fencer disappeared from radar while descending through cloud during a coastal surveillance flight along the Black Sea in Krasnodar Krai. Its wreckage was found ≈9 miles (15 km) from Novorossiysk and 25 miles (40 km) from Anapa. Both crew did not eject and were killed.
- 13 June – A prototype of the Sukhoi Su-30 crashed during a demonstration at the opening of the 43rd Paris Air Show.

== 2000s ==
=== 2000 ===
- 16 June – A fuel leak from a missile poisoned 11 servicemen at a naval base in Primorsky Krai.
- 12 August – In the Kursk submarine disaster a series of explosions aboard the nuclear-powered submarine Kursk sinks the submarine killing all 118 people on board.
- 25 October – A Russian Air Force Ilyushin Il-18 crashed near Batumi, Georgia killing all 86 people on board.

=== 2001 ===
- 27 January – An Antonov An-70 prototype crashed close to Omsk Tsentralny Airport during testing of the aircraft. All 33 passengers and crew on board the aircraft survived.
- 17 July - A Su-33 crashed during an air show in Pskov Oblast. The pilot, Major-General Timur Apakidze, died in the crash.
- 1 December – An Ilyushin Il-76TD caught fire and crashed near Novaya Inya, Khabarovsk Krai killing all 18 on board.

=== 2002 ===
- 21 February – A Russian Navy Antonov An-26, crashed 1.5 km short of the runway at Lakhta Airfield, near Arkhangelsk, during an emergency landing. Of the 20 people on board, 17 were killed.

=== 2003 ===
- 30 August – The decommissioned November-class nuclear-powered submarine K-159 sank while it was being towed to Polyarny, Murmansk Oblast in the Barents Sea to be stripped of its nuclear reactors. Nine crew members died.
- 18 September – A TU-160 strategic bomber crashed in Engels-2 base near Sovetskoye, Saratov oblast. All four crew members were killed.

=== 2005 ===
- 5 August – AS-28, under the command of Lieutenant Vyacheslav Milashevskiy, became entangled with the aerial of a hydrophone array off the coast of Kamchatka, in Berezovaya Bay, 70 km southeast of Petropavlovsk-Kamchatskiy. The aerial, anchored by 60-tonne concrete blocks, snared the propeller of the submarine, and the submarine then sank to the seafloor at a depth of 190 m (600 ft). This was too deep for the ship's complement of seven to leave the submarine and swim to the surface. On August 7, all seven sailors were rescued with the help of the United States Navy and the Royal Navy
- 6 September – During maneuvers of the Northern Fleet, in the northern Atlantic, a Su-33 fell in the water during landing on the aircraft carrier Admiral Kuznetsov. The pilot was able to catapult himself and survived.
- 15 September – A Sukhoi Su-27 Flanker of the 6th Air and Air Defence Forces Army, 177th Fighter Regiment, during a flight between St. Petersburg and Kaliningrad, for unknown reasons veered off its course while travelling over neutral waters of the Baltic Sea, entering Lithuanian airspace and crashing in the Jurbarkas region. No one was injured, and pilot Maj. Valery Troyanov ejected safely.

=== 2006 ===
- 7 September – A fire broke out in the submarine, Daniil Moskovsky, as it was being towed across the Barents Sea to Vidyayevo, Murmansk Oblast. Two on board died.

=== 2008 ===
- 20 March - A Su-25 exploded in mid-air during a live firing exercise over Primorsky Krai, 143 km from Vladivostok, killing the pilot. Further investigations revealed that the aircraft was downed by a missile accidentally launched by a wingman.
- 15 July – Seven soldiers died and six were injured in Chechnya after a tank shell they were loading exploded unexpectedly.
- 8 November – The Akula II-class submarine K-152 Nerpa's freon fire extinguishing system was accidentally activated, killing 20 and injuring at least 22 people. The incident occurred while the submarine was conducting sea trials off the Russian Pacific coast.
- 17 October – A MiG-29 crashed in Chita Oblast causing the fleet to be grounded temporarily.
- 5 December – A MiG-29 lost part of its tail section due to corrosion and crashed in southern Siberia. The whole fleet was grounded for inspection and 90 planes were found to be in a dangerous condition.

=== 2009 ===
- 7 January – A small fire broke out on board the Admiral Kuznetsov while anchored off Turkey. The fire, caused by a short circuit, led to the death of one crew member from carbon monoxide poisoning.
- 15 January – Two Ilyushin Il-76MDs collided in Dagestan after one of them tried to make a landing with low visibility. Eleven were killed and one aircraft was damaged beyond repair while the other suffered substantial damage.
- 11 February - An Antonov An-2 aircraft suffered a loss in engine power while climbing through an altitude of about 50–70 metres. The pilot had to carry out a forced landing in a wooded area because he could not reach the airport at Pskov. All three crew members and ten paratroopers on board survived.
- 16 February – The Admiral Kuznetsov, along with other Russian naval vessels, was involved in a large oil spill while refueling off the south coast of Ireland.
- March – A fire broke out on the hull of the decommissioned nuclear submarine Orenburg, a Delta III-class submarine while at the Severodvinsk docks in Arkhangelsk Oblast.
- 26 April – The fourth Su-35BM prototype was destroyed in a high-speed taxi run due to brake failure. The aircraft crashed into the barrier at the end of the runway at Dzyomgi Airport, Khabarovsk Krai and was destroyed. The pilot ejected and sustained burns.
- 4 May – A Kamov Ka-27 Helicopter landing on the frigate Yaroslav Mudry, crashed on the deck and then rolled over the side into the Baltic Sea. The five helicopter crew were successfully rescued.
- 17 June – A Sukhoi Su-24MR Fencer crashed on landing at the Monchegorsk Air Base, Murmansk Oblast. The aircraft from the 98th Separate Reconnaissance Aviation Regiment suffered a heavy landing forcing the two crew to eject safely
- 19 June – A Sukhoi Su-24MR Fencer from the 1st Composite Air Division, North Caucasus Military District crashed near the village of Kostino-Bystrianská, Rostov-on-Don, Rostov Oblast after suffering a mechanical fault that forced the two crew to eject safely after several aborted landings.
- 16 August – Two Russian Knights air display Sukhoi Su-27 jets collided during training near Zhukovsky Airfield, outside of Moscow, killing one pilot, Igor Tkachenko, and injuring five civilians on the ground.
- October – Another blaze occurred during the decommissioning of the nuclear submarine, Kazan at Severodvinsk.
- 1 November – An Ilyushin Il-76 belonging to the Russian Ministry of Interior crashed shortly after takeoff in Sakha Republic. The 11 crewmembers died.
- 6 November – A Russian Naval Aviation Tupolev Tu-142 M3 from the 310th Independent Long Range Anti-Submarine Aviation Regiment based at Kamenny Ruchey Airbase, Khabarovsk Krai crashed on a routine training exercise into the Tatar Strait near Sakhalin island 15–20 km from the coast off Cape Datta north of Sovetskaya Gavan with the loss of all 11 crew.
- 14 November – Explosion on the outskirts of Ulyanovsk at Arsenal 31, a navy depot. Two firemen died during the decommissioning of munitions.
- 23 November – Second explosion at Arsenal 31. Eight soldiers died as they removed munitions.

== 2010s ==
=== 2010 ===
- 14 January – A Sukhoi Su-27 crashed near Komsomolsk-on-Amur, Khabarovsk Krai. Pilot killed.
- February – A blaze broke out on the decommissioned nuclear submarine K-480 Ak Bars, at Severodvinsk. Casualties unknown.

=== 2011 ===
- 26 May – Explosion in an arms depot in the village of Urman in Bashkortostan. 12 people were injured and 40 buildings damaged. Over 2,000 people were evacuated from the surrounding area. The cause was blamed by an official on the "combustion of gunpowder traces".
- 2 June – Explosion in an arms depot near Izhevsk, Udmurtia. 20,000 inhabitants of the surrounding area had to be evacuated. 95 people were injured in the blast, and two elderly people nearby died of heart attacks possibly caused by the sound of the blast. Windows were shattered up to 10 km away. A discarded cigarette was initially blamed for the blast.
- 6 September – A MiG-31 on a training mission crashed in Perm Krai, killing the two pilots.
- 29 December – The Delta-IV-class nuclear submarine, Ekaterinburg, caught fire while in dry-dock in the Roslyakovo shipyard, north of Murmansk. The blaze broke out on scaffolding that had been erected around it. The rubber outer hull was badly burnt and nine people were injured fighting the fire. No radiation leak was detected.

=== 2012 ===
- 13 March – A new Ka-52 attack helicopter crashed near Torzhok, Tver Oblast, killing both pilots.
- 2 May – Explosion at a military training centre near Nizhny Novgorod killed six soldiers.
- 23 May – A Russian An-30 military aircraft crashed while landing in Čáslav, Czech Republic. 23 were on board at the time, six of whom suffered burns, with one being left in a critical condition. The plane's front landing gear collapsed as it touched down, causing it to leave the runway and break in two, catching fire. The passengers were made up of 14 Russians and nine Czechs, all on an Open Sky treaty mission, for conducting surveillance flights over the territory of participant nations (NATO members, Russia and other countries).
- 6 September – A Mikoyan MiG-29 crashed into a hill near Chita in the Siberian Military District, killing the pilot.
- 8 September – A Mil Mi-35 crashed into a mountain in bad weather in the Republic of Dagestan, all four on board killed.
- 26 September – Explosion at an arms depot 180 km northwest of Orenburg killed one officer.
- 30 October - A Su-24M crashed in Chelyabinsk Oblast. During the flight the nose cone fractured. After attempting an emergency landing, the crew of two flew to open territory and safely ejected.
- October – 4,000 tons of munitions at an arms depot in Orenburg Oblast exploded after a soldier failed to extinguish his cigarette. One officer was injured and inhabitants of the surrounding area were evacuated.

=== 2013 ===
- 12 March – A United Nations Mil Mi-8 with a crew of four Russians crashed near Bukavu, Democratic Republic of the Congo, all crew members were killed.
- 16 March – A Russian Federal Border Guard Service Mil Mi-8MN crashed at Khankala Air Base in Chechnya in low visibility, three of the four crew killed.
- 18–19 June – Explosion at the Chapaevsk arms depot in Samara Oblast. 6,000 inhabitants of the surrounding area had to be evacuated. 30 people were injured in the blast caused by the "involuntary" explosion of shells.
- 16 September – 15 sailors were injured after a fire broke out on the nuclear submarine K-150 Tomsk at a shipyard near Vladivostok. Officials claimed the nuclear reactor was "deactivated" prior to the fire.
- 23 September – A Sukhoi Su-25 crashed during a training mission in Krasnodar Krai, pilot ejected but was killed.
- 22 October – Explosion at a firing range near Strugi Krasnye, Pskov Oblast, killed six soldiers – five cadets from the Ryazan Higher Airforce Institute, and one sergeant from Pskov. Two others were injured. It is thought that one of them stepped on unexploded ordnance.
- 29 October – A Ka-52 helicopter crashed south-east of Moscow. Both pilots ejected safely.

=== 2014 ===
- 11 February – A Su-24 bomber crashed in Volgograd Oblast just after take-off. Both pilots died. Pilot or mechanical error were suspected.
- 14 July – A Sukhoi Su-57 prototype aircraft suffered an in-flight emergency and was severely damaged by an engine fire after landing at Zhukovsky airbase outside Moscow. The pilot managed to escape unharmed.

=== 2015 ===
- 7 April – Orel, an Oscar II-class submarine, caught fire during repairs in a dry dock in the Severodvinsk shipyard. No casualties have been reported and the nuclear reactor had been turned off before the fire started.
- 4 June – A MiG-29 fighter crashed and was completely destroyed in Astrakhan Oblast. Both pilots parachuted to safety.
- 4 June – An unarmed Su-34 bomber in Voronezh Oblast overshot the runway after its parachute failed to open on landing. It overturned, severely damaging the aircraft.
- 8 June – A Tupolev Tu-95 ran off a runway at Ukrainka Air Base, Amur Oblast and caught fire during take-off. One crew member was killed and another badly burned.
- 3 July - A MiG-29 Fulcrum multirole jet fighter crashed in Krasnodar Krai. The pilot managed to catapult before the crash and was found later by a search team. Technical failure and pilot error were considered as possible reasons of the crash.
- 5 July – A MiG-29 crashed in Krasnodar Krai reportedly due to a fire on board. The pilot ejected and survived.
- 6 July – A Sukhoi Su-24M Fencer frontal strike-bomber crashed in Khabarovsk Krai soon after takeoff. Both pilots died.
- 13 July – A recently renovated barracks collapsed at a training facility for paratroopers in Svetlyy, near Omsk. 23 soldiers died and 22 sustained injuries.
- 14 July – A Tupolev Tu-95MS Bear strategic bomber crashed during a training flight 80 km from Khabarovsk, killing two of seven pilots.

=== 2016 ===
- 29 April – The decommissioned Soviet-era nuclear submarine K-173 Krasnoyarsk caught fire while being disassembled in Vilyuchinsk, Kamchatka. The Defence Ministry reported that its rubber-coated outer hull caught fire.
- 19 May – Six soldiers died and 16 were injured after their bus suffered a probable brake failure and left a mountain road in South Ossetia.
- 9 June – A Sukhoi Su-27 fighter jet crashed 30 km from Moscow, killing the pilot.
- 1 July - An Ilyushin Il-76 firefighting aircraft was destroyed after impacting wooded terrain 9 km east-southeast from the settlement of Rybnyi Uyan in Irkutsk Oblast. Eight crewmembers and two passengers were killed.
- 14 August - A Beriev Be-200ES amphibious jet aircraft sustained damage after hitting treetops while fighting a forest fire near São Pedro do Sul, Portugal. The aircraft sustained damage to the leading edges of both wings, with the right hand wing flaps sustaining dents and cuts and the right hand wing float suffering a large hole. No fatalities were recorded.
- 14 November – A MiG-29K crashed in the Mediterranean while attempting to land on the Admiral Kuznetsov.
- 3 December - A Su-33 based on the Admiral Kuznetsov crashed while making a second landing attempt after a combat sortie over Syria. The pilot survived without injuries and was immediately recovered by search and rescue teams. According to the Russian Ministry of Defence, the aircraft was lost after an arresting cable ruptured.
- 19 December – An Il-18 transport aircraft belonging to the Russian Defence Ministry crashed in high winds near Tiksi in the Sakha Republic. All on board survived. 38 were taken to hospital, with four in a critical condition.
- 25 December – A Tupolev Tu-154 jetliner owned by the Russian Defense Ministry crashed 1.5 km off the coast of Sochi while en route to Khmeimim Air Base in Syria. The aircraft had flown from Chkalovsky Airport, Moscow Oblast and had landed at Sochi to refuel. All 92 passengers and crew aboard died, including Valery Khalilov, artistic director of the Alexandrov Ensemble, and 63 other members of the military choir.

=== 2017 ===
- 26 April – A MiG-31 from the Far Eastern Military District crashed during a training flight near the Telemba proving ground in the Republic of Buryatia. Both crew members reportedly ejected safely.
- 27 April – Russian spy ship Liman sank off the Turkish coast, 29 km from Kilyos, after colliding with a freighter in fog. All 78 crew members were rescued.
- 30 May – An Antonov AN-26 transport crashed at the end of a training flight at the Balashov airbase in Saratov Oblast and caught fire. One crew member died and four were injured. Engine failure was suspected.
- 10 August – An S-200 Angara anti-aircraft missile exploded at a recycling centre in Chita, Zabaykalsky Krai, having been stolen from a military base and sold for scrap. Two were killed and one person was injured as it was being dismantled. A second missile was also discovered awaiting recycling.
- 14 September – A Tupolev Tu-22M, of the 326th Heavy Bomber Division overran the runway at Shaykovka, Kaluga Oblast, and was damaged beyond repair. No deaths were reported.
- 28 September – A Tu-22M3 "Backfire" bomber was badly damaged after aborting takeoff following a speed sensor failure while participating in the Zapad ("West") military exercises. It ran off the runway, losing a wing, in Shaykovka, Kaluga Oblast. No injuries were reported among the four-man crew.
- 10 October – A Sukhoi Su-24M crashed during takeoff at Khmeimim Air Base in Syria supposedly due to a technical malfunction. Both crew members failed to eject and died.

=== 2018 ===
- 6 March – An An-26 transport aircraft crashed while landing at Khmeimim Air Base in Syria. All 39 military personnel on board died. Initial information suggested a technical problem caused the crash.
- 17 September – An Ilyushin Il-20 reconnaissance aircraft was shot down by friendly Syrian forces about 22 miles from the Syrian coast as it returned to Khmeimim airbase, killing 15 personnel on board.
- 30 October – The Admiral Kuznetsov was damaged while undergoing a refit: the dry dock sank, sending a 70-tonne crane crashing onto the ship and causing a 5-meter gash. One shipworker went missing and four required medical care after falling into the sea near Murmansk.

=== 2019 ===
- 22 January – A Tu-22M3 bomber crashed as it was approaching to land at Olenya air base, Murmansk Oblast. Russia's Defense Ministry reported that three crewmembers died and one pilot was injured.
- 1 July – A navy research submersible, thought to be AS-12 Losharik, suffered a fire and 14 crew members died due to fume inhalation. The vessel had been conducting research in Russia's Arctic territorial waters, according to the Defence Ministry, though Russian media reports said it was a nuclear mini-submarine deployed in special operations.
- 5 August – A military depot exploded near Achinsk, Krasnoyarsk Krai killing one and injuring at least eight others, and prompting the evacuation of thousands. Russia's Defense Ministry said a fire triggered the explosions at a storage facility for gunpowder charges. Authorities declared a state of emergency in the region. Air traffic was suspended within 30 kilometres (19 mi) of the munitions site.
- 8 August – Five military and civilian specialists were killed and three were injured in an explosion at a naval test facility in Arkhangelsk Oblast while testing a liquid jet engine, said to be for the nuclear-powered Burevestnik cruise missile. Earlier the same day there were reports of a fire and explosions at a military facility near Nyonoksa in the same region. The facility has a navy missile test range used to test intercontinental ballistic missiles, cruise missiles and anti-aircraft missiles. The administration in nearby Severodvinsk reported elevated radiation levels for 40 minutes leading to a rush on medical iodine. However, Russia's defence ministry insisted no harmful chemicals had been released.
- 9 August – Shells again exploded at the Achinsk military depot that saw explosions four days prior. Nine were injured. This time the explosions were blamed on a lightning strike.
- 11 December – An Mi-28 attack helicopter crashed in Krasnodar Krai killing two crew members.
- 12 December – The Admiral Kuznetsov, caught fire during repair work at Murmansk. Six were injured and one person was reported missing.
- 17 December – A Tupolev Tu-22M3 long-range bomber suffered a failed engine and sustained damage during an emergency "belly landing" near the Chkalov State Flight Testing Centre in Astrakhan Oblast. Neither of the two-man crew was injured and the nuclear-capable bomber was unarmed.
- 24 December – A Sukhoi Su-57, the first serial aircraft, crashed near Dzyomgi Airport, Khabarovsk Krai, during the final stage of its factory trials due to malfunction of the control system. The pilot ejected and was recovered by helicopter.

== 2020s ==
=== 2020 ===
- 19 February – A Sukhoi Su-25UB caught fire and burned out at Lipetsk-2 Air Base. Both crew survived.
- 25 March – A Sukhoi Su-27 crashed into the Black Sea off Russian-occupied Crimea, killing the pilot.
- 25 March – An Aero L-39 Albatros crashed in Krasnodar Krai, killing the pilot.
- 19 May – An Mil Mi-8 helicopter crash-landed in an uninhabited area near Klin, Moscow Oblast, killing all three crew members. The incident was believed to have been caused by a technical malfunction.
- 26 May - A Mil Mi-8 helicopter crashed in Ugolny Airport near Anadyr, killing its four occupants.
- 22 September – A Sukhoi Su-30 fighter jet was probably accidentally shot down by a Su-35 fighter jet during exercises near a village in Tver Oblast. The two pilots ejected before the aircraft crashed and were reported to be in a "stable condition".
- 7 October – A depot with 75,000 tonnes of munitions caught fire in Ryazan Oblast, injuring five people and prompting the evacuation of 2,000 people from nearby villages after a wildfire set off explosions. More than 400 firefighters battled the blaze.

=== 2021 ===
- 23 March – Three crewmembers died after a Tu-22M strategic bomber's ejection system suddenly went off at an airfield near Kaluga. Due to the insufficient altitude for parachute opening, the victims received fatal injuries upon landing.
- 19 June – A L-410 aircraft belonging to DOSAAF that took off from Tanai airfield crashed into a forest in Kemerovo Oblast. Seven people died and another 17 were injured
- 24 June - A Mil Mi-8 crashed in the Gatchinsky District in Leningrad Oblast, killing all three crew members.
- 31 July – An SU-35 crashed due to an engine failure in Khabarovsk Krai. The pilot ejected safely.
- 14 August – A Beriev Be-200 crashed near Kahramanmaraş, Turkey while on a firefighting mission. The five Russian military crew members and three Turkish forest inspectors were killed.
- 17 August – The only flying prototype Il-112V suffered a fire in the right engine and crashed near Kubinka Air base. All three crew on board were killed, including test-pilot Nikolai Kuimov, who was awarded the title of Hero of the Russian Federation.
- 18 August – A MIG-29 crashed in Astrakhan Oblast during a routine flight, killing the pilot.
- 23 August – A MIG-29 caught fire and completely burned during maintenance work in Astrakhan Oblast.
- 27 August – A SU-24 crashed in Perm. The two pilots ejected and only suffered minor injures
- 10 October – An L-410 belonging to DOSAAF crashed in Tatarstan, killing 16 people and injuring six.

=== 2022 ===
- 25 January - While undergoing welding work in a Saint Petersburg shipyard the Kashtan-class salvage ship SS-750 developed smoke in its battery charging room. Firefighters of the shipyard responded and the potential fire was extinguished with no material damages.
- 28 January - A Mil Mi-8 helicopter crashed near Dubki, in Ulyanovsk Oblast. One crew member died and the other two were injured.
- 29 January – A MIG-31 crashed and split in half in Novgorod Oblast. The two pilots ejected safely
- 24 February - An Antonov An-26 crashed in Uryv-Pokrovka, Voronezh Oblast, killing all six crew members.
- 8 April - A MIG-31 crashed in Leningrad Oblast. The pilots managed to eject.
- 14 April – The cruiser Moskva sank in the Black Sea during hostilities with Ukraine following a fire, as claimed by Russian authorities. Ukraine claimed it sank the ship with a missile. Officially Russia admitted one sailor died, but independent reports suggested 40 may have perished.
- 22 April – Seven people died after a fire at a key aerospace defence research institute in Tver. Authorities said 25 people were also injured and 10 people were missing.
- 22 June – Four people died in an explosion at an ammunition depot in Vladimir Oblast after an object “spontaneously detonated during a loading and unloading operation”. Three of the victims were soldiers and one was a civilian specialist.
- 24 June – Five people died and four people were wounded after a Il-76 hit power lines and crashed near Ryazan.
- 1 October – A MIG-31BM interceptor aircraft crashed during takeoff from Belbek Air Base in Crimea. While the navigator/weapons system officer ejected successfully, the pilot died and the aircraft burned out.
- 17 October – 15 people died in Yeysk, Krasnodar Krai after a Su-34 fighter jet crashed into an apartment building. It was on a training flight when an engine reportedly caught fire. The two crew members bailed out safely. 28 residents were injured.
- 23 October – Two pilots were killed after a Sukhoi Su-30 fighter jet crashed into a house in Irkutsk during a test flight. No casualties were reported on the ground.
- 28 October – Svetlana Babayeva, the bureau chief of the Rossiya Segodnya media group in Simferopol, Russian-occupied Crimea, was killed by a stray bullet while covering shooting practice at a military training ground in Crimea.
- 2 December – A MIG-31 interceptor aircraft crashed in Primorsky Krai during a training flight, the crew ejected safely
- 22 December – The Admiral Kuznetsov caught fire again while on repair work in Murmansk. The fire was extinguished rapidly and no casualties were reported

=== 2023 ===
- 1 January – A Mil Mi-8 belonging to the Special Flight Detachment ‘Rossiya’ crashed in Moscow's Vnukovo International Airport. According to reports, the helicopter's tail rotor blades appeared to have been sheared off. No casualties were reported.
- 23 February – An Su-25 crashed in Belgorod Oblast following a "technical malfunction", killing its pilot.
- 7 March – A Mil Mi-8 belonging to the motorcade of Deputy Chairman of the Security Council of Russia Dmitri Medvedev, had its tail rotor torn off after it hit a road sign while landing at the Beloyarsk Nuclear Power Station in Sverdlovsk Oblast.
- 20 April – A Su-34 accidentally discharged its ordnance over Belgorod, injuring two civilians, damaging buildings and vehicles, and leaving a huge crater about 20 metres (60 ft) wide in the city centre.
- 26 April – A MIG-31 crashed in Murmansk Oblast after catching fire. The pilots ejected safely and did not require hospitalization.
- 12 May – An Mi-28 crashed in the Dzhankoi district of Russian-occupied Crimea during a training flight, killing both pilots. The Russian Defence Ministry suspected equipment failure for the cause.
- 13 May – Two Mi-8s, an Su-34 and an Su-35, crashed in Bryansk Oblast, on their way to a bombing run in Ukraine with no survivors among the nine personnel on board. The Russian government attributed the loss of one helicopter near Klintsy to engine fire while refusing to explain the other crashes. Other sources attributed Ukrainian forces for shooting down the aircraft.
- 4 July – A MIG-31 crashed into Avacha Bay on the southeastern coast of Kamchatka during a training mission.
- 17 July – An Su-25 crashed into the Sea of Azov off the coast of Yeysk, Krasnodar Krai, after suffering "engine failure" shortly after taking off for a training flight, killing its pilot.
- 12 August – An Su-30 crashed in a deserted area of Kaliningrad Oblast during a training mission, killing the two pilots on board. Authorities blamed the likely cause on a technical malfunction.
- 14 August – An Aero L-39 Albatros crashed while landing on an airfield in Krasnodar Krai during a training mission, killing the pilot.
- 29 August – An Mi-8 belonging to the FSB crashed due to a suspected technical malfunction in a forest near Prudny, Chelyabinsk Oblast, killing all three people on board.
- 12 September – An Su-24 crashed in a deserted area of Volgograd Oblast while flying on a training mission, the pilots survived according to Russian state news agencies.
- 20 September – An Su-34 crashed in Voronezh Oblast while flying on a training mission, the two pilots survived.
- 20 October – A Russian Air Force Il-76 transport aircraft suffered a runway excursion during takeoff from Hisar Air Base near Dushanbe, Tajikistan. A fire erupted after the aircraft veered off the runway, destroyed it. No injuries were reported.
- 30 November – Twelve soldiers were killed and eight others were injured by an accidental explosion possibly caused by a misfire of a RPG-7 grenade launcher at the Kuzmin military training ground in Rostov Oblast just after their lunch break.
- 7 December – A member of Rosgvardia was killed while two others were injured after an explosive device “self-detonated” during shooting drills at the Dubrovichi aviation training ground in Ryazan Oblast.

=== 2024 ===
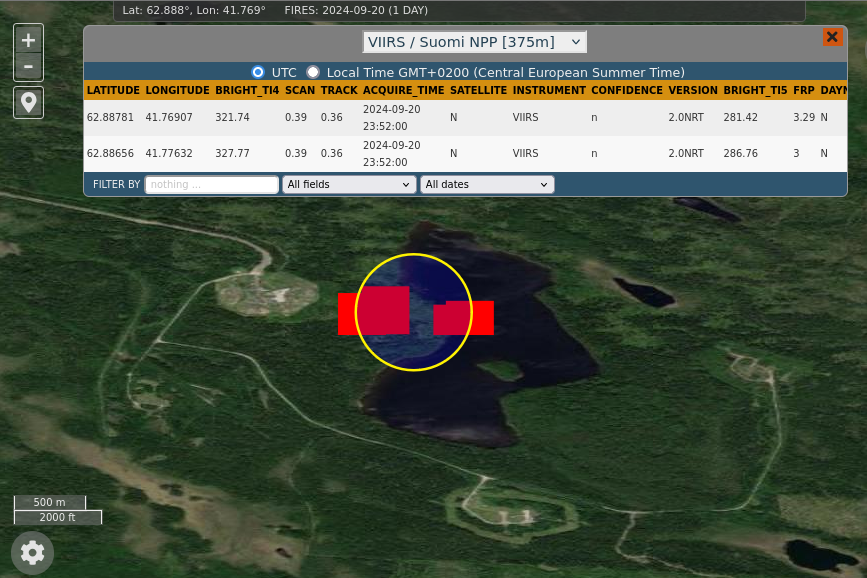
NASA's FIRMS detected fire at a Plesetsk Cosmodrome test site on 20 September 23:52:00 (UTC)

- 2 January – A Russian Air Force aircraft accidentally released its explosive ordnance on the village of Petropavlovka, Voronezh Oblast, injuring four people and damaging six buildings.
- 8 January – A Russian Air Force aircraft accidentally released an FAB-250 warhead over Rubizhne, Russian-occupied Luhansk Oblast. No casualties or damage were reported, and the warhead failed to detonate.
- 12 March – A Russian Air Force IL-76 transport aircraft carrying 15 people on board caught fire and crashed during takeoff in Ivanovo Oblast.
- 19 March – A civilian fishing trawler was accidentally struck by a missile during exercises by the Baltic Fleet off the coast of Kaliningrad Oblast, killing three people and injuring four others. Russian authorities blamed the incident on a fire and said that only one person was killed.
- 28 March – An Su-35 crashed into the Black Sea off the coast of Sevastopol. The pilot ejected and was rescued.
- 10 April – An Mi-24 helicopter crashed due to possible equipment failure off the Crimean coast.
- 17 May – A 76-mm artillery shell from World War II that was stored inside a basement of the Budyonny Military Academy of the Signal Corps in Saint Petersburg exploded during cleaning works, injuring seven soldiers.
- 11 June – An Su-34 crashed during a training flight in the mountains of North Ossetia, killing its two pilots.
- 25 July – An Mi-28 helicopter crashed due to a suspected technical malfunction in Zhizdrinsky District, Kaluga Oblast, killing its entire crew.
- 27 July – A Su-34 crashed in Volgograd Oblast. The two pilots ejected safely from the aircraft.
- 15 August – A Tu-22M3 bomber crashed in Irkutsk Oblast. The four crew ejected from the aircraft. One crew member died and the other three were injured.
- 19 or 20 September – A test of an RS-28 Sarmat at Plesetsk Cosmodrome in Arkhangelsk Oblast failed, destroying a launch silo with its surrounding facilities and causing a fire detected by NASA's FIRMS. Maxar imagery showed a 62 m (203 ft) wide crater where the launch silo had been.
- 10 October – A Yakovlev Yak-130 crashed in Volgograd Oblast. The pilot ejected successfully from the aircraft but was lightly injured.

=== 2025 ===
- 1 January – A Mil Mi-28 helicopter crashed in Voronezh Oblast.
- 18 March – A Mil Mi-28 helicopter crashed in Leningrad Oblast, killing its entire crew.
- 25 March – An Su-25 fighter jet crashed in Primorsky Krai. The pilot ejected and was rescued.
- 2 April – A Tu-22M3 bomber crashed in Usolsky District, Irkutsk Oblast. The four crew members ejected from the aircraft but one of them died.
- 23 May – A Mil Mi-8 helicopter crashed near Naryshkino, Oryol Oblast, killing its entire crew.
- 1 July – An Su-34 crashed during a training flight in Nizhny Novgorod Oblast following a suspected mechanical failure. The two crew members safely ejected.
- 8 July – A Sokol Altius military drone crashed into a dacha during a training flight in Tatarstan. No injuries were reported. The drone's manufacturer, Ural Works of Civil Aviation, blamed the crash on "unidentified external electronic warfare devices".
- 9 October – A MiG-31 crashed in Lipetsk Oblast, the two pilots on board ejected safely.
- 13 November – An Su-30 crashed in the Republic of Karelia, killing the two occupants on board.
- 9 December – An An-22 military transport aircraft carrying seven people crashed during a test flight in Ivanovo Oblast, killing everyone on board.

=== 2026 ===
- 31 March – An Antonov An-26 transport plane crashed into a cliff in Crimea, killing all 30 occupants on board.
- 3 April – An Su-30 fighter aircraft crashed during a training flight in Crimea. Both crew ejected and were rescued.
- 15 June – A Tupolev Tu-22M3 crashed in Irkutsk Oblast. All four crew members ejected from the aircraft.
- 23 July – A Sukhoi Su-57 fighter jet crashed in Moscow Oblast. The pilot ejected from the aircraft.
- 29 September – A Tupolev Tu-95 crashed during a training flight near Krasnoyarovo, Amur Oblast, killing six out of seven occupants on board.
- 21 October – An Su-30 crashed in Kaliningrad Oblast. The two crew members ejected from the aircraft.
- 17 November – A Antonov An-12 crashed near Yagunovo, Kemerovo Oblast. All 19 people on board were killed.

== See also ==
- Nuclear navy for a list of nuclear accidents including Soviet vessels
- The Severomorsk Disaster in 1984
- Dedovshchina – bullying in the Russian army.
- Komsomolets Nuclear Submarine Memorial Society
- List of Chinese military accidents
- List of Russian aircraft losses in the Second Chechen War
