= Samuel Loring Morison =

American intelligence official

- Born: October 30, 1944; London, England
- Died: January 14, 2018
- Burial place: Arlington National Cemetery
- Education: Tabor Academy; University of Louisville
- Criminal penalty: Two years
- Criminal status: Pardoned
- Espionage activity
- Agency: Naval Intelligence Support Center
- Service years: 1974 – 1984

Samuel Loring Morison (October 30, 1944 – January 14, 2018) was an American intelligence professional who was convicted of espionage and theft of government property in 1985 and pardoned in 2001. He was "the only [American] government official ever convicted for giving classified information to the press".

== Early life ==
Morison was born in London, England, where his father was stationed during World War II. His paternal grandfather, Samuel Eliot Morison, was a distinguished naval historian, a Rear Admiral in the Naval Reserve and Harvard University professor. Morison spent much of his younger years in New York and Maine. He attended Tabor Academy, a college preparatory school in Massachusetts, and graduated from the University of Louisville in 1967.

== Career ==
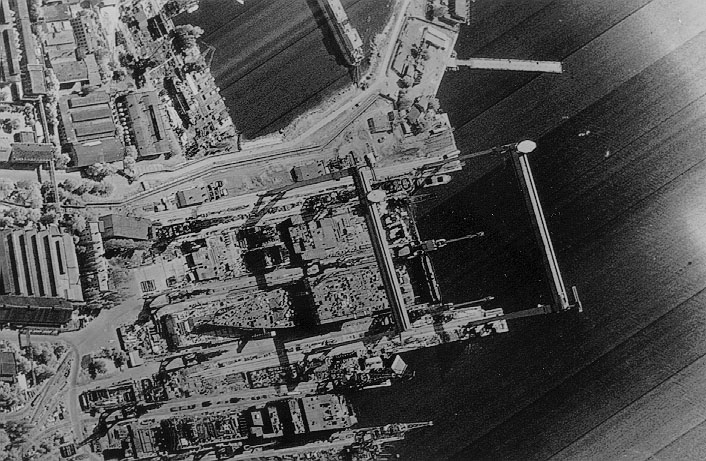
KH-11 image of the construction of a Kiev-class aircraft carrier, left, then known as the Kharkiv, along with an amphibious landing ship, as published by Jane's in 1984.

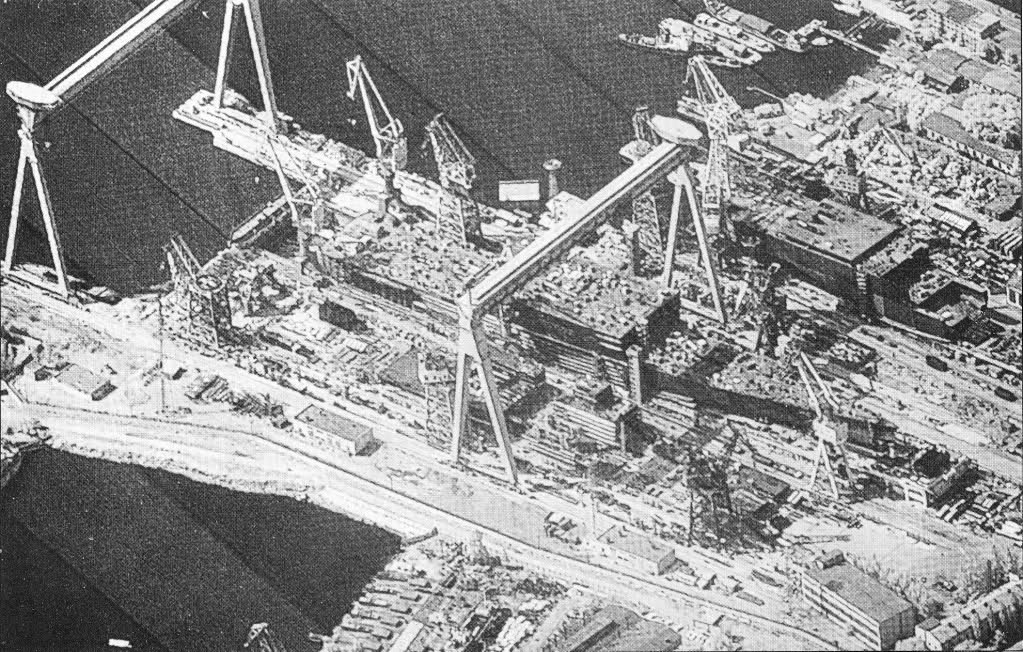
One of two KH-11 photos taken leaked to Jane's Defence Weekly. It shows the construction of a Kiev-class aircraft carrier.

Morison worked as an intelligence analyst at the Naval Intelligence Support Center (NISC) in Suitland, Maryland, from 1974 to 1984, specializing in Soviet amphibious and mine-laying vessels. During those years, Morison also earned $5,000 per year as a part-time contributor and editor of the American section of the London-based Jane's Fighting Ships, an annual reference work on the world's navies.

Conflicts with his supervisors led Morison to seek a full-time position with Jane's in London. At this time, he began overstepping the boundary of permissible information that could be sent to Jane's. As a GS-12 Soviet amphibious ship analyst with a Top Secret clearance, Morison provided Jane's with three secret satellite photographs that he had taken from the desk of a coworker at NISC in July 1984. Morison cut classified control markings from them before mailing them to Jane's.

In 1984, two images of Soviet aircraft taken by a KH-8 or KH-9 satellite were inadvertently published in records of Congressional hearings. That same year, Jane's Defence Weekly was provided with several images taken by a KH-11 satellite of a Soviet naval shipbuilding facility. A 1984 computer-enhanced KH-11 photo, taken at an oblique angle, was leaked, along with two others, to Jane's Defence Weekly. The image shows the general layout of the Nikolaiev 444 shipyard on the Black Sea. Under construction is the Kiev-class aircraft carrier Admiral Gorshkov, originally named Kharkov and later Baku, along with an amphibious landing ship.

According to the US Government prosecutors, Morison also provided Jane's with a copy of a classified report on the damage to the Soviet navy base in Severomorsk that resulted from a 1984 explosion.

== Prosecution and pardon ==
A joint investigation by the Naval Investigative Service and the FBI led to Morison, who was arrested on October 1, 1984. A search of his apartment in Crofton, Maryland, revealed several hundred government documents, some of them classified. Investigators never demonstrated any intent to provide information to a hostile intelligence service. Morison was charged with espionage and theft of government property. Morison told investigators that he sent the photographs to Jane's because the "public should be aware of what was going on on the other side", meaning that the new nuclear-powered aircraft carrier would transform Soviet capabilities. He said that "if the American people knew what the Soviets were doing, they would increase the defense budget." British intelligence sources thought his motives were patriotic. Prosecutors emphasized personal economic gain and Morison's complaints about his government job. Morison once wrote to his editor at Jane's: "My loyalty to Jane's is above question."

On October 17, 1985, Morison was convicted in Federal Court on two counts of espionage and two counts of theft of government property. He was sentenced to two years in prison on December 4, 1985. The Supreme Court declined to hear his appeal in 1988.

Following Morison's conviction, the Reagan administration continued its campaign against leaks. In April 1986, an Assistant Under Secretary of Defense was fired for sharing classified information with reporters. In May, CIA Director William Casey threatened to prosecute five news organizations–the Washington Post, the Washington Times, the New York Times, Time and Newsweek–and succeeded in delaying the publication of a Washington Post story.

As a result of the Morison case, policy guidelines for adjudicating security clearances were changed to include consideration of outside activities that present potential conflict of interest.

In 1998, Senator Daniel Patrick Moynihan asked for appeal on the grounds of "the erratic application of that law and the anomaly of this singular conviction in eighty-one years". He cited examples of serious espionage cases exposed by the Venona project that were not pursued, specifically mentioning Theodore Hall, and other cases that had been dismissed, including those of Daniel Ellsberg and Anthony Russo.

President Clinton pardoned Morison on January 20, 2001, the last day of his presidency, despite the CIA's opposition to the pardon.

== Post-pardon activity ==
In June 2014, Morison was arrested and charged with stealing government property from the Naval History and Heritage Command (the Navy's archives) in Washington, D.C. The records were related to his grandfather, Rear Admiral Samuel Eliot Morison. He pleaded guilty and was sentenced to two years of probation on condition that he assist in returning the documents, which he stored in his home in Crofton, Maryland.

Morison died in 2018.

== See also ==
- List of people pardoned or granted clemency by the president of the United States
