= 2024 Ilyushin Il-76 crash =

2024 Ilyushin Il-76 crash may refer to one of the following incidents,

- 2024 Korochansky Ilyushin Il-76 crash
- 2024 Ivanovo Ilyushin Il-76 crash
- 2024 Darfur Ilyushin Il-76 shootdown
