= K278 =

K278 or K-278 may refer to:

- K-278 (Kansas highway), a state highway in Kansas
- Soviet submarine K-278 Komsomolets, a former Soviet Union submarine
