= List of lost Russian or Soviet submarines =

These Russian or Soviet submarines either suffered extensive crew casualties or were entirely lost to enemy action or to "storm or perils of the sea." A dagger (†) indicates that the boat was lost.

This list is not known to be complete.

According to the U.S. Navy, "The former Soviet Union secretly disposed of about 16 submarines by sinking them in the northern oceans."

See also the list of Russian or Soviet submarines.

== Before the Russian Revolution ==
- Дельфин (Delfin) (1904) †

== Before World War II ==
- Shch-103 (1935, storm)
- D-1 (1940, sea trials)
- S-2 (1940, Winter War)

== During World War II ==
=== 1941 ===
Baltic Fleet

- L-2
- M-71 (scuttled)
- M-74
- M-80 (scuttled)
- M-81
- M-83 (scuttled)
- M-94
- M-98
- M-99
- M-103
- S-1 (scuttled)
- S-3
- S-5
- S-6
- S-8
- S-10
- S-11
- Kalev
- Ronis (scuttled)
- Spidola (scuttled)
- Shch-301
- Shch-319
- Shch-322
- Shch-324

Black Sea Fleet

- D-6 (scuttled)
- M-34
- M-58
- M-59
- S-34
- Shch-204
- Shch-206
- Shch-211

Pacific Fleet

- L-16
- M-57
- M-63

=== 1942 ===
Baltic Fleet

- M-95 †
- M-97 †
- S-7 †
- Shch-302 †
- Shch-304 †
- Shch-305 †
- Shch-306 †
- Shch-308 †
- Shch-311 †
- Shch-317 †
- Shch-320 †

Black Sea Fleet

- A-1 (scuttled)
- M-31 †
- M-33 †
- M-60 †
- M-118 †
- S-32 †
- Shch-208 †
- Shch-210 †
- Shch-212 †
- Shch-213 †
- Shch-214 †

Northern Fleet

- D-3 †
- L-24 †
- K-2 †
- K-23 †
- M-121 †
- M-173 †
- M-175 †
- M-176 †
- Shch-401 †
- Shch-405 †
- Shch-421 † (intentionally sunk after hitting mines)

Pacific Fleet

- L-16 †
- Shch-138 (blew up due to torpedo explosion)

=== 1943 ===
Baltic Fleet

- S-9 †
- S-12 †
- Shch-323
- Shch-406 †
- Shch-408 †

Black Sea Fleet

- A-3 †
- D-4 †
- Shch-203 †

Northern Fleet

- К-1 †
- К-3 †
- К-22 †
- M-106 †
- M-122 †
- M-172 †
- M-174 †
- S-55 †
- Shch-403 †
- Shch-406 †
- Shch-408 †
- Shch-422 †

=== 1944 ===
Baltic Fleet

- M-96 †

Black Sea Fleet

- L-6 †
- L-23 †
- M-36 †
- Shch-216 †

Northern Fleet

- M-108 †
- S-54 †

=== 1945 ===
Baltic Fleet

- S-4 †

Pacific Fleet

- L-19 †

== After World War II ==
- S-117 (1952) †
- M-200 Месть (Mest) (1956) †
- M-256 (1957) †
- К-19 (1961)
- S-80 (1961)
- B-37 (1962) †
- K-3 Leninsky Komsomol (1967)
- K-129 (1968) †
- K-27 (1968) †
- K-8 (1970) †
- K-56 (1973)
- S-178 (1981)
- K-429 (1983)
- K-131 (1984)
- K-219 (1986) †
- K-278 Komsomolets (1989) †

== After the fall of the Soviet Union ==
- Kursk (2000) †
- K-159 (2003) †
- B-237 (2023)

The Komsomolets Nuclear Submarine Memorial Society aids the dependents of sailors lost in these disasters.
