= Komsomolets Nuclear Submarine Memorial Society =

The Komsomolets Nuclear Submarine Memorial Society (Russian: Общество памяти атомной подводной лодки ВМФ Комсомолец), literally Society Remembering Atomic Underwater Boat VMF Komsomolets is a charitable non-profit organization providing assistance to the families of Soviet and Russian submariners lost at sea.

During the Cold War, many Soviet submarines experienced serious accidents, killing 578 submariners. As of 2005, 31 fathers and mothers, 37 widows, and about 26 children survive those casualties. The pensions, allowances, and benefits to which the survivors are entitled might have been adequate in the Soviet economy, but are inadequate to support a family in the new Russian economy.

In 1992, Vice Admiral Evgeniy Demitrievich Chernov (ret.) founded a charitable society to support the widows and orphans of his former command, Soviet submarine K-278 Komosomlets. Since then, the Society's charter has expanded to include the dependents of all sailors killed in submarine disasters — except those of Russian submarine K-141 Kursk. The Russian government has compensated families of Kursk sailors with at least US$32,000 and a free house in any town in Russia. This sum is orders of magnitude more generous than that provided to the dependents of any other Soviet or Russian submarine disaster, so the Society reserves its limited funds for those with the greatest need.

== See also ==
- List of Russian military accidents
- Russia launches mission to the sunken Komsomolets nuclear submarine, on Bellona, Published on May 25, 2021 by Charles Digges
