= 2011 Type 094 accident =

Coordinates: 38.8031°N 121.1230°E

2011 Type 094 submarine accident
- Date: 29 July 2011
- Location: Dalian, Liaoning, China
- Type: Suspected radiation leak
- Cause: Installation error during electronic system upgrade
- Outcome: International concern; diplomatic tension with South Korea

A Type 094 nuclear submarine belonging to China is thought to have suffered a release of radioactivity in July 2011. Media coverage of the event has been banned, leading to international concern over the handling of the crisis. The Chinese government denies any radiation leak has occurred.

== The event ==
On 29 July 2011 a release of radioactivity is thought to have taken place on board an 8,000-ton Type 094 Jin-class nuclear-powered ballistic missile submarine, docked in Dalian. According to reports, China Era Electronics Corporation was installing an electronic system when the leak occurred.

== International reaction ==
South Korea has demanded that China clarify the situation and stop trying to cover up the event. The conservative Chosun Ilbo newspaper stated that the "Chinese authorities must waste no time in providing Korea with credible information."

== See also ==
- List of Chinese military accidents
