= List of military accidents in China =

This is a list of Chinese military accidents that have taken place in the People's Republic of China involving the People's Liberation Army. It is likely to be incomplete due to the difficulty in reporting such accidents because of state control of the Chinese media.

== 2000s ==
- 2003 – explosion on board an overcrowded Ming-class diesel-powered submarine, Navy Submarine No. 361, killed 70. "The most startling thing about this episode is that [the government] issued a public report," noted Evan S. Medeiros, then a China specialist at the RAND Corporation. The capacity of the submarine was for 57 men, including 10 officers. The exact cause of the explosion is unclear, but the submarine most likely did not sink.

== 2010s ==
- August 2011 – radioactivity release on board an 8,000-ton Type 094 Jin-class nuclear-powered ballistic missile submarine, docked in Dalian. According to reports, China Era Electronics Corporation was installing an electronic system when the leak occurred.

== Other incidents ==
Details are unclear, but The Washington Post reported in 2003 that there had been other incidents, including "the reported explosion of a Xia class nuclear submarine during construction", and that one of the first Ming-class submarines was scrapped because a fire broke out on board also during construction.

== See also ==
- List of Russian military accidents
