= Severomorsk Disaster =

1984 Soviet munitition fires in Murmansk

1984 Severomorsk Disaster
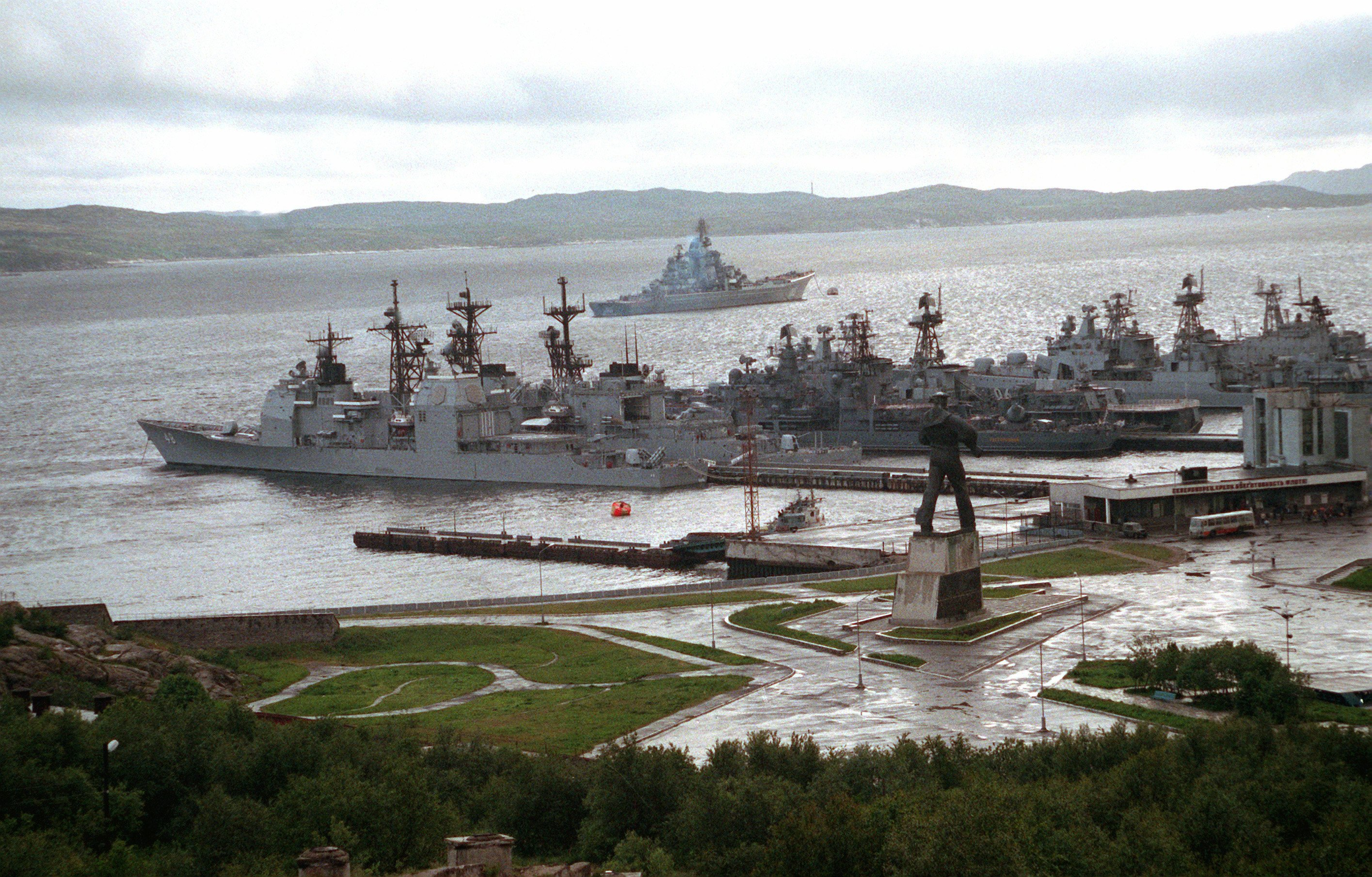
- Severomorsk Naval Base in July, 1992
- Date: 13–17 May, 1984
- Time: Unknown
- Duration: ca. 5 days
- Location: Severomorsk, Murmansk Oblast, Russian SFSR, Soviet Union
- Type: munitions explosions, fire
- Deaths: 200–300 killed
- Injuries: Unknown
- Property damage: 580 of the Northern Fleet's estimated 900 S-125 Neva/Pechora surface-to-air missiles and 320 of the fleet's 400 SS-N-3 Shaddock cruise missiles.

The Severomorsk Disaster was a deadly series of munitions fires that resulted in the detonation and destruction of large amounts of munitions that lasted from May 13 to 17, 1984, within the Okolnaya naval munitions depot, near the Severomorsk Naval Base (headquarters of the Northern Fleet of the Soviet Navy). The detonation occurred in the Northern Russian "closed" town of Severomorsk (Russian: Северомо́рск), over 900 miles (1,448.4 kilometers) from the Russian capital Moscow.

Munitions had reportedly detonated after a fire started on May 13, which thus caused a massive chain of explosions on May 17, and resulted in the deaths of at least 200–300 people, and the destruction of at least 900 of the Northern Fleet's missiles and torpedoes.

Most of the dead were allegedly ordnance technicians "sent into the fire in a desperate but unsuccessful effort to defuse or disassemble munitions before they exploded", according to the New York Times.

== Background ==
The town of Severomorsk has long had history with the armed forces of both the Soviet Union and the Russian Federation, a history that dates to before the Second World War. It is a history in part signified by the presence of at least two Russian military airbases within 10 kilometers (6.2 mi) of the town, as well as a naval base and its munitions depot (the Okolnaya naval munitions depot), as well as serving as the main administrative base of the Northern Fleet.

At the time of the disaster, the Northern Fleet was believed to have an aircraft carrier, 148 cruisers, destroyers and other warships, and 190 of the navy's 371 submarines, of which two were apparently stationed at the munitions depot.

== Incident ==
Military installations around Severomorsk

On May 13, 1984, a fire started in the Okolnaya munitions depot on the outskirts of Severomorsk, the cause of which allegedly was that munitions had been stored too close together. On May 17, the fire caused the detonation of the munitions at the depot. For about an hour and a half, sporadic blasts occurred at the supply depot, that resulted in the deaths of between 200–300 people, most of whom were ordnance technicians that had been "sent into the fire in a desperate but unsuccessful effort to defuse or disassemble munitions before they exploded", according to The New York Times. Dozens of local civilians began to evacuate their apartments and head to the hills, as the blast was allegedly so powerful that it was first thought a nuclear accident had occurred. The blast and the evacuation were described on a Russian navy blog:

Women ran into the streets with children in their arms, many only half dressed in house coats and slippers, the men running henny-penny with them, certain of them in uniform, giving the scene a weird drama. People ran up the stairs that lead up the slopes of the hills. Someone fell, he was picked up and dragged. Cars jammed the routes out of town. The cars were packed, but despite this they stopped to pick up children which their mothers literally threw into the arms of strangers. Screams, cries, curses – all drowned out by the thunder and howl from the volcano that was Mount Okol'naya [the apparent namesake of the Okolnaya Naval Munitions depot, where the incident had begun days earlier]. Black with an orange-purple mushroom top, growing to its full height in an instant, nodding toward the town, but afterwards it began to slowly settle in the direction of the tundra and the ocean.

== Reporting and aftermath ==
One of the first mentions of the incident in the media was, reportedly, an article published on July 10 of the same year by the newly established British non-fiction military weekly magazine, Jane's Defence Weekly (JDW), which claimed that it had obtained the information from "Western intelligence sources."

Though no nuclear weapons were damaged during the fire and subsequent explosion, according to the Norwegian Defence Research Establishment, had nuclear weapons detonated during the blasts, the nuclear fallout would've almost certainly reached Norway, just 100 km (62 mi) away.

== See also ==
- List of Russian military accidents
