= 2023 Bryansk Oblast military aircraft crashes =

Multiple simultaneous military aircraft crashes in Bryansk Oblast, Russia

Occurrence
- Date: 13 May 2023
- Summary: Shot down
- Site: Bryansk Oblast, Russia, near the border with Ukraine
- Total fatalities: 9

On the morning of 13 May 2023, an air group of four aircraft of the Russian Air Force crashed almost simultaneously in the Bryansk Oblast of Russia: two Mi-8 helicopters, a Su-34 fighter-bomber and a Su-35 fighter. According to Baza, nine people were killed: three crew members each in two Mi-8s, two Su-34 pilots and a Su-35 pilot.

The incident occurred on the backdrop of the Russian invasion of Ukraine. According to Kommersant, the group was heading to bomb Chernihiv Oblast in Ukraine.

== Background ==
During the Russian invasion of Ukraine, Russian troops repeatedly shelled the Chernihiv and Sumy oblasts of Ukraine, as well as the city of Kharkiv bordering Russia. At the same time, the heads of western Russian provinces, Belgorod, Bryansk and Kursk oblasts, regularly announced supposed artillery shelling and attacks against the regions.

On the eve of the incident in Bryansk Oblast, on 12 May, a Russian military helicopter Mi-28 crashed in the Dzhankoi Raion of the Russian-annexed Crimea.

== Incident ==
According to Kommersant, the fallen aircraft were part of the same aviation group. The fighters were supposed to launch a missile strike on Ukraine's Chernihiv Oblast, while the helicopters were to "insure" the aircrews were safe and to make sure the Russian soldiers did not get shot down by the Ukrainian forces.

According to Russian military officers, both Mi-8 helicopters crashed over Klintsy, while the Su-34 and Su-35 fighters crashed near the border with Ukraine in the Starodubsky District. According to Russian authorities, the incident injured a civilian woman and damaged five households on the ground.

It was reported that one of the downed helicopters was a rare modification, Mi-8MTPR-1. Helicopters of this type are equipped with the Rychag-AV electronic warfare system, which was used to detect enemy radar stations and install radar jamming.

== Versions ==
Various versions of what could have happened were put forward. According to one of them, the military aircraft could have been shot down by saboteurs with MANPADS who penetrated into Bryansk Oblast from Ukraine. Ukrainian Telegram channels suggested the aircraft could have been shot down by friendly fire from Russian air defense forces. There was also a version that Ukrainian aircraft could have shot down Russian targets from Ukrainian territory using AIM-120 medium-range missiles.

== Reactions ==
Yurii Ihnat, Speaker of the Air Forces Command of the Armed Forces of Ukraine, said that the Ukrainian army was not involved in the crashes of aircraft in Bryansk Oblast, but said that "Russian air defense is involved". At the same time, Ihnat claimed that the Russians lost in fact five aircraft: three helicopters and two airplanes.

Yevgeny Prigozhin, the then head of the Wagner Group, also hinted that Russian air defense systems could have been involved in the crashes: "Four planes, if you draw a circle around the places where they fell, it turns out that this circle with a diameter (where they all lie exactly in the circle) is 40 kilometers. That is, the radius of the circle is 20 kilometers. Now go to the Internet and see what kind of air defense weapon could be located in the center of this circle, and then build your own versions."

President of Belarus Alexander Lukashenko said that Belarusian troops were put on high alert due to events in Russia's Bryansk Oblast, where "four aircraft were shot down".

The Wall Street Journal correspondent Yaroslav Trofimov suggested this incident constituted the "worst day for the Russian military aviation since the first week of the war, when Moscow assumed that it had destroyed Ukrainian air defences".
