= 2022 Russian Air Force Ilyushin Il-76 crash =

2022 aviation accident in Russia

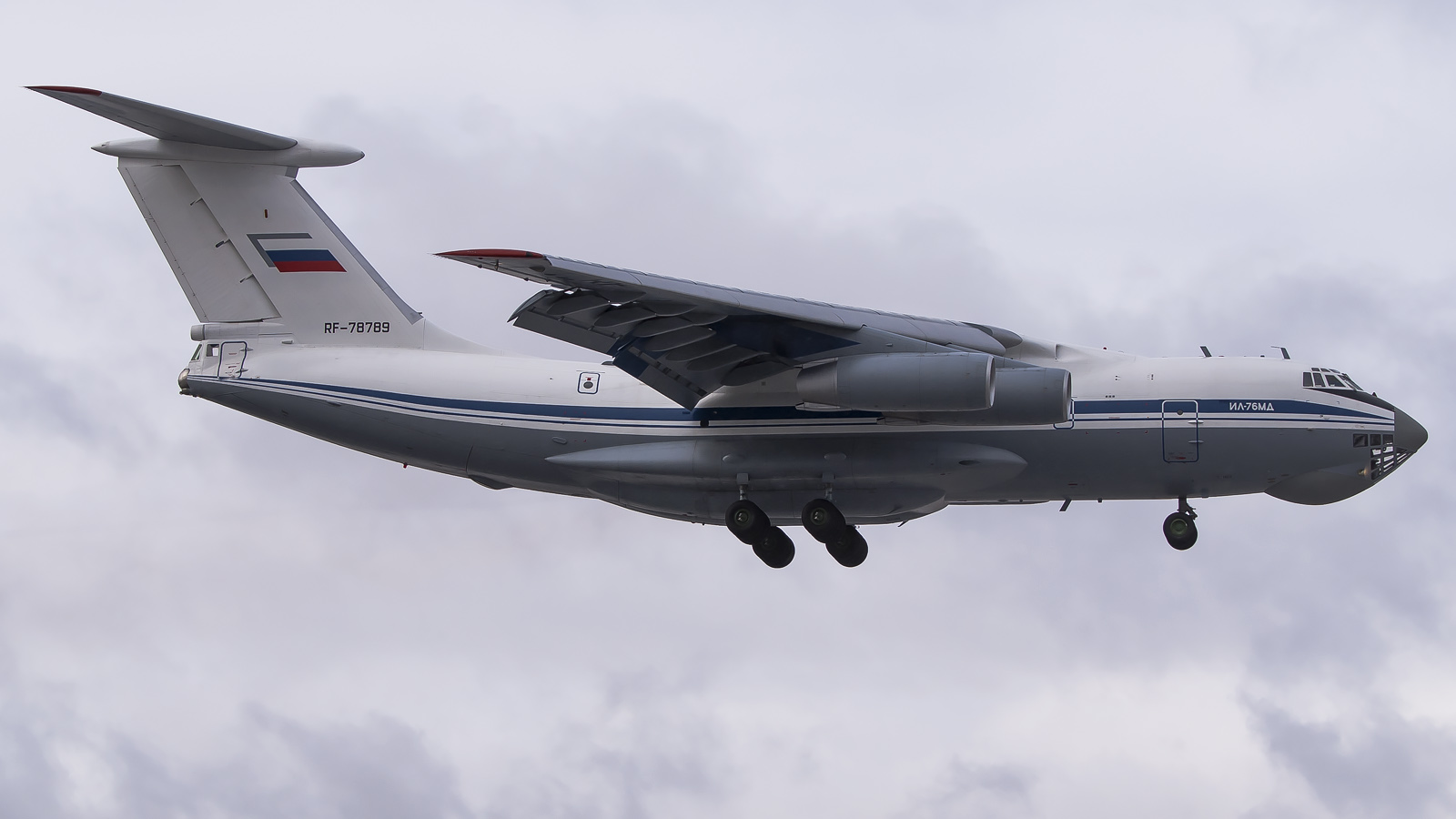
- Ilyushin 76 of the Russian Air Force, Similar to the aircraft involved in the accident.

Accident
- Date: June 24, 2022
- Summary: Crash landing caused by an in-flight fire in engine No. 4 shortly after takeoff.
- Site: Mikhaylovsky District, Ryazan Oblast, Russia; 54°37′27″N 39°39′13″E

Aircraft
- Aircraft type: Ilyushin Il-76MD
- Operator: Russian Air Force
- Registration: RF-78778
- Flight origin: Orenburg Tsentralny Airport
- Destination: Belgorod International Airport
- Occupants: 9
- Crew: 9
- Fatalities: 5
- Injuries: 4
- Survivors: 4

In the early morning of June 24, 2022, an Ilyushin Il-76MD cargo aircraft of the Russian Air Force was operating a flight from Orenburg Tsentralny Airport to Belgorod International Airport with an intermediate flight to Dyagilevo air base crashed immediately after takeoff from Dyagilevo air base, near the Mikhailovsky highway area in the city of Ryazan.

According to the Russian Ministry of Defence, the plane was operating a training flight from Orenburg to Belgorod and landing in Ryazan for refueling.

== Crew ==
There were 9 crew members on board.

The following people died as a result of the disaster:

- Vladimir Petrushin (aircraft commander);
- Stepan Perminov (navigator)
- Nikolai Gorbunov (flight engineer-instructor);
- Dmitriy Andreev (aeronautical engineering by ADO);
- Alexey Lobanov (cadet, 5th year in flight school; died in the hospital).

== Chronology of events ==
The aircraft performed a training flight from Orenburg to Belgorod with an intermediate landing (for refueling) in Ryazan. There was no cargo on board of the aircraft.

Immediately after takeoff from the air base in Ryazan, a fire broke out in its No.4 engine. The crew decided to make an emergency landing. Before landing, the plane circled over the meadows.

At 3:18 PM, the plane made a hard landing on the ground, damaging power lines. The plane crashed and caught fire. There is no significant damage on the ground after the crash.

Three people died immediately after the crash. The remaining 6 were hospitalized. Two more people later died in the hospital.
