= 2024 Ivanovo Ilyushin Il-76 crash =

Aircraft crash in Russia

- RF-76551, the aircraft involved in the accident, pictured in September 2021

Occurrence
- Date: 12 March 2024
- Summary: Engine separation and crash following engine fire
- Site: Near Ivanovo Severny Air Base, Ivanovo Oblast, Russia; 57°02′34.1″N 41°01′05.8″E

Aircraft
- Aircraft type: Ilyushin Il-76MD
- Operator: Russian Air Force
- Registration: RF-76551
- Flight origin: Ivanovo Severny Air Base
- Destination: Plesetsk Air Base
- Occupants: 15
- Passengers: 7
- Crew: 8
- Fatalities: 15
- Survivors: 0

On 12 March 2024, an Ilyushin Il-76 cargo plane crashed in Russia's Ivanovo Oblast. Fifteen people were on board when the aircraft crashed; eight crew and seven passengers. No survivors were found. Russian sources said one of its engines caught fire and the plane crashed soon after takeoff. Russia's defense ministry cited an engine fire as the most probable cause of the crash.

== Flight ==
According to Denis Pasler, governor of Orenburg Oblast, the flight was carrying pilots from Orenburg. He added that they were from the 117th Military Transport Aviation Regiment. Meanwhile, the governor of Tver Oblast, Igor Rudenya, also said there were pilots from Tver.

The crash occurred at 13:00 Moscow time near Bogorodskoye District in Ivanovo Oblast. One of the aircraft's engines caught fire during takeoff for a routine flight. There were unconfirmed videos of the aircraft plummeting downwards with one engine on fire where it soon then detached. Another video showed a column of smoke rising upwards. The aircraft crashed while attempting to land at Ivanovo-Severny airfield.

== Aftermath ==
Firefighters arrived at the crash site and extinguished the blaze. The governor of Ivanovo Oblast, Stanislav Voskresensky, said there was no damage to villages near the crash. and offered condolences to the relatives of the victims. A search and rescue mission was concluded on the same day of the crash by the Ministry of Emergency Situations. A ministry source told TASS that all 15 people on board the aircraft died in the crash.

Russia's defense ministry said a board of the Russian Aerospace Forces flew to Ivanovo Oblast to investigate the crash. It added that an engine fire was the likely cause of the crash.

== See also ==
- List of Russian military accidents
- List of accidents and incidents involving military aircraft (2020–present)
