= Soviet submarine K-278 Komsomolets =

Nuclear-powered attack submarine

Coordinates: 73.7238°N 13.2662°E

- K-278 Komsomolets profile

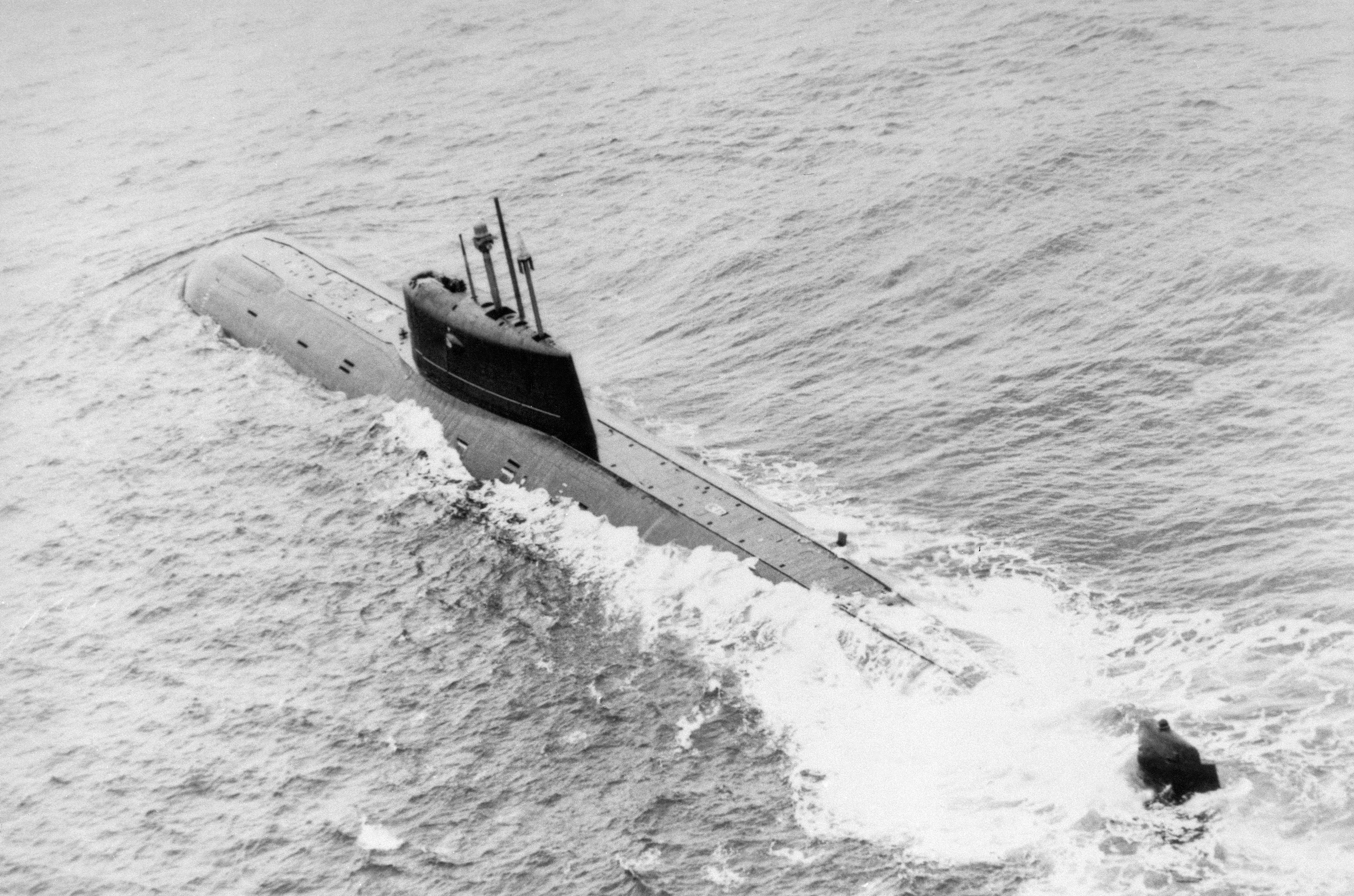
- K-278 upon deployment on 1 January in 1986.

History

Soviet Union
- Name: K-278 (1983–1988); K-278 Komsomolets (1988–1989)
- Builder: Sevmash
- Yard number: 510
- Laid down: 22 April 1978
- Launched: 9 May 1983 (3 June 1983)
- Commissioned: 28 December 1983
- Decommissioned: 6 June 1990
- Home port: Bolshaya Lopatka at Zapadnaya Litsa
- Fate: Sank due to fire on 7 April 1989, killing 42
- Notes: Located in the Barents Sea in 1,700 m (5,600 ft) of water

General characteristics
- Class & type: NATO reporting name "Mike"-class submarine
- Displacement: 4,400–5,750 tons surfaced, 6,400–8,000 tons submerged
- Length: 117.5 m (385 ft)
- Beam: 10.7 m (35 ft)
- Draft: 8 to 9 m (26 to 30 ft)
- Propulsion: One 190 MW OK-650 b-3 PWR (HEU <= 45%), two 45000 shp steam turbines, one shaft
- Speed: 14 knots (26 km/h; 16 mph) surfaced, 26 to 30 knots (48 to 56 km/h; 30 to 35 mph) submerged
- Test depth: 1,000 m safe, 1,250 m design, 1,500 m crush
- Complement: 64 (30 officers, 22 warrant officers, 12 petty officers and enlisted)
- Armament: SS-N-15 Starfish anti-submarine missiles; 6 x 533 mm (21-inch) torpedo tubes for 53-65 torpedo and VA-111 Shkval torpedoes

K-278 Komsomolets was the Project-685 Plavnik (Russian: проект-685 плавник, meaning "fin", also known by her NATO reporting name of "Mike"-class), nuclear-powered attack submarine of the Soviet Navy; the only submarine of her design class.

In the inventory of the Soviet military, K-278 was unique for her submarine depth rating, having reached a depth of 1,020 metres (3,350 feet) in the Norwegian Sea on 4 August 1984. Although K-278 was commissioned in the Soviet Navy to evaluate the technology for the fourth generation of Russian nuclear submarines, she was capable of combat maneuvering and deployment.

During her third operational patrol in the Arctic Ocean in 1989, a serious fire in the aft compartments led to her sinking in the Norwegian Sea.

Despite the fire in the engineering compartment, K-278 surfaced and remained afloat for approximately five hours before sinking. Many of the crew perished before rescue, leading to 42 total dead (and 27 survivors).

The wrecked submarine sits on the floor of the Norwegian Sea, about 1.7 km (1 mile) deep, with her nuclear reactor and two nuclear warhead-armed torpedoes still on board.

== Design ==
The Project 685 was designed by the Rubin Design Bureau in response to a challenge to develop an advanced submarine that could carry a mix of torpedoes and cruise missiles with conventional or nuclear warheads. The order to design the submarine was issued in 1966 and design was completed in 1974. The keel was laid down on 22 April 1978 at Severodvinsk. K-278 was launched on 3 June 1983 and commissioned on 28 December 1983.

K-278 had a double hull, the inner one being composed of titanium, which gave her an operating depth far greater than that of the best American submarines. The pressure hull was composed of seven compartments with the second and third protected by stronger forward and aft bulkheads creating a "safety zone" in case of an emergency. An escape capsule was fitted in the fin above these compartments to enable the crew to abandon ship in the event of an underwater emergency. Initial Western intelligence estimates of K-278's speed were based on the assumption that the boat was powered by a pair of liquid metal cooled reactors. When the Soviet Union revealed that the submarine used a single OK-650b-3 conventional pressurized-water reactor, these speed estimates were lowered. (Note: The OK-650 reactor was also installed on Project 971 (Akula), Project 945 (Sierra), and in pairs on the Project 941 (Typhoon) submarines.)

== Crew ==
According to Norman Polmar and Kenneth J. Moore, two Western experts on Soviet submarine design and operations, the Project 685's advanced design included many automated systems which allowed for fewer crew members than usual for a submarine of her size. The manning table approved by the Soviet Ministry of Defense in 1982 called for a crew of 57 men. This was later increased to 64: 30 officers, 22 warrant officers, and 12 petty officers and seamen. At the time of the boat's sinking, 69 were aboard.

== Name ==
In October 1988, K-278 became one of the few Soviet submarines to be given a name: Komsomolets (Комсомолец, meaning "a member of the Komsomol"), and her commanding officer, Captain 1st rank Yuriy Zelenskiy was honoured for diving to 1,020 metres (3,350 ft).

== Sinking ==
On 7 April 1989, while under the command of Captain 1st Rank Evgeny Vanin and running submerged at a depth of 335 metres (1,099 ft) about 180 kilometres (100 nmi) southwest of Bear Island (Norway), a short circuit caused a fire in an engineering compartment. Even though watertight doors were shut, the resulting fire spread through bulkhead cable penetrations. The reactor scrammed and propulsion was lost. Electrical problems spread as cables burned through, and control of the boat was threatened as temperatures reached 2,000 °F (1,090 °C) An emergency ballast tank blow was performed at 11:13 and the submarine surfaced eleven minutes after the fire began. Distress calls were made, and most of the crew abandoned ship.

The fire continued to burn, fed by the compressed air system. At 15:15, several hours after surfacing, the boat sank in 1,680 metres (5,510 ft) of water, about 250 kilometres (135 nmi) SSW off Bear Island. The commanding officer and four others who were still on board entered the escape capsule and ejected it. Only one of the five to reach the surface left the capsule and survived before it sank in the rough seas. Captain Vanin was among the dead.

Rescue aircraft arrived quickly and dropped small rafts, but winds and sea conditions precluded their use. Many men had already died from hypothermia in the 2 °C (36 °F) water. The floating fish factory B-64/10 Aleksey Khlobystov (Алексей Хлобыстов) arrived 81 minutes after K-278 sank, and took aboard survivors.

Of the 69 crewmen, 27 survived the incident and 42 died: 9 during the accident and the subsequent sinking, 30 in the water of hypothermia or injuries, and 3 aboard the rescue boat. The crew were awarded the Order of the Red Banner after the incident.

During the sinking, five men boarded the escape capsule located in the fin. Almost as soon as the hatch of the escape capsule was closed, a knocking sound was heard from outside; a person had been locked out. Due to the design of the capsule, it was not possible to let him in and so he perished. 5 men remained in the pod: Captain first rank Evgeniy Vanin, Midshipman Viktor Slusorenko, Warrant officers Chernikov and Krasnobayev and a junior officer, Yudin. As the pod surfaced, a pressure difference ripped off the top hatch of the pod and launched it into the air, killing all but one of the men. Viktor Slusorenko was the only survivor, which he claimed was caused by "the voice of God" telling him to put on his personal breathing equipment.

== Aftermath ==
As well as eight standard torpedoes, K-278 was carrying two torpedoes armed with nuclear warheads. Under pressure from Norway, the Soviet Union used deep sea submersibles operated from the oceanographic research ship Keldysh to search for K-278. In June 1989, two months after the sinking, the wreck was located. Soviet officials stated that any possible leaks were insignificant and posed no threat to the environment.

In 1993, Vice Admiral Chernov, commander of the submarine group of which the Komsomolets was part, founded the Komsomolets Nuclear Submarine Memorial Society, a charity to support the widows and orphans of his former command. Since then, the Society's charter has expanded to provide assistance to the families of all Soviet and Russian submariners lost at sea, and 7 April has become a day of commemoration for all submariners lost at sea.

An expedition in mid-1994 revealed some plutonium leakage from one of the two nuclear-armed torpedoes. On 24 June 1995, Keldysh set out again from Saint Petersburg to the Komsomolets to seal the hull fractures in Compartment 1 and cover the nuclear warheads, and declared success at the end of a subsequent expedition in July 1996. A jelly-like sealant was projected to make the wreck radiation safe for 20 to 30 years.

Norwegian authorities from the Marine Environmental Agency and Radiation Agency take water and ground samples from the vicinity of the wreck on a yearly basis.

In July 2019, a joint Norwegian–Russian expedition found "clouds" emitted from a ventilation pipe and a nearby grille. That pipe had been identified as a leak by several Mir missions up to 1998 and 2007. Water samples were taken from within the plume of the release and analysed for caesium-137, measuring activity up to 792 Bq/L. The radionuclides are rapidly diluted away from the leakage point, and represent no immediate environmental risk.

A 2019 report revealed that the radiation is seeping out of the submarine.

According to a BBC article from July 2026 the submarine is a "ticking time bomb". The report quotes a 1993 interview with Russian Greenpeace activist Dimitri Litvinov and a March 2026 report claiming that while the submarine's nuclear-tipped torpedoes are still sealed, the reactor's condition is degrading and releasing radioactive material into the sea. According to a team from the Norwegian Radiation Protection Authority the leak isn't constant, but there are sporadic bursts from specific locations in the hull.

== See also ==
- List of sunken nuclear submarines

== Bibliography ==
- The Sunken Nuclear Submarine Komsomolets and its effects on the Environment (by Steinar Høibråten, Per E. Thoresen and Are Haugan. Published by Elsevier Science. 1997)
- Wallace, Wendy, "Komsomolets: A Disaster Waiting to Happen?", CIS Environmental Watch, Spring 1992.
- Montgomery, George, "The Komsomolets Disaster", Studies in Intelligence, Vol. 38, No. 5 (1995)
- Romanov, D. A., Fire at Sea: The Tragedy of the Soviet Submarine Komsomolets. Edited by K. J. Moore. Washington, DC: Potomac Books, Inc., 2006. (Note: Romanov was the Soviet submarine's deputy designer at the Rubin Design Bureau and he defends his agency's design against the Soviet Navy's initial claims that "numerous technical imperfections" caused the accident.)
- Gary Weir and Walter Boyne, Rising Tide: The untold story of the Russian submarines that fought the Cold War, New York: Basic Books,(2003)
- J.P. Gwynn, H.E. Heldal, H. Teien, A. Volynkin, S.M. Jerome, & O.C. Lind. Status of the sunken nuclear submarine Komsomolets in the Norwegian Sea, Proceedings of the National Academy of Sciences (PNAS) Vol. 123, No. 13. March 31, 2026. doi:10.1073/pnas.2520144123
- INRO Staff (1991). "New Historic Information on the Soviet Navy". Warship International. XXVIII (3): 240–271. ISSN 0043-0374.
